= French ship Vengeur du Peuple =

Ship of the line of the French Navy

Coordinates: 47.4°N 17.4667°W

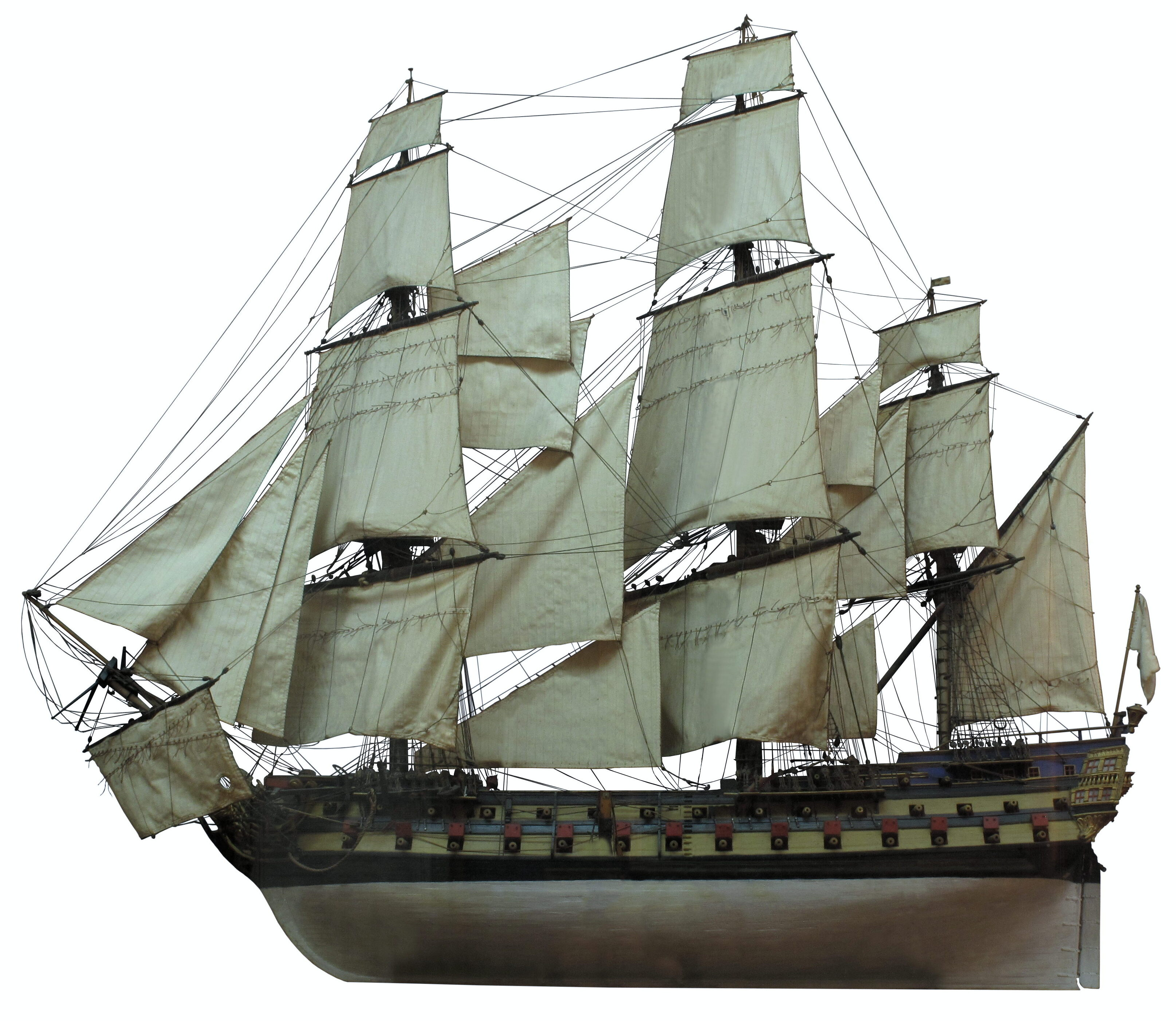
- Ship model of Vengeur du Peuple

History

France
- Name: Marseillois (1766–1794); Vengeur du Peuple (1794–1794)
- Namesake: Chamber of commerce of Marseille; "Avenger of the People"
- Ordered: 16 January 1762
- Builder: Toulon shipyard, plan by Coulomb and building by Chapelle
- Laid down: February 1763
- Launched: 16 July 1766
- In service: November 1767
- Fate: Sunk on 1 June 1794 during the Glorious First of June

General characteristics
- Displacement: 2900 tonneaux
- Tons burthen: 1550 port tonneaux
- Length: 54.28 metres (178.1 ft)
- Beam: 13.98 metres (45.9 ft)
- Draught: 6.83 metres (22.4 ft)
- Sail plan: Full-rigged ship
- Complement: 731 men (1778–1779 campaign): 9 officers, one surgeon, one priest; 8 naval guards
- Armament: 74 guns: Lower battery: 28 × 36-pounders; Upper battery: 30 × 18-pounders; Quarterdeck: 10 × 8-pounders; Forecastle: 6 × 6-pounders
- Armour: Timber

Vengeur du Peuple ("Avenger of the People") was a 74-gun ship of the line of the French Navy. Funded by a don des vaisseaux donation from the Chamber of Commerce of Marseille, she was launched in 1766 as the Marseillois. (Note: The name is sometimes written Marseillais, which is the modern orthography. See The dictionary of French naval fighting ships - General remarks for details.) She took part in the naval operations in the American Revolutionary War in the French fleet under Admiral Charles Henri Hector, Count of Estaing, duelling HMS Preston in a single-ship action on 11 August 1778, taking part in the Battle of the Chesapeake where she duelled HMS Intrepid, and supporting the flagship Ville de Paris at the Battle of the Saintes. She also took part in the Battle of Saint Kitts.

After the loss of the 74-gun French ship Vengeur (launched 1789) in June 1793, the 28-year-old Marsellois was renamed Vengeur du Peuple in February 1794 (Note: The name is often shortened to Vengeur. See French ship Vengeur for details.) and under that name she took part in the Battle of the Glorious First of June. There, she was disabled after a furious duel with HMS Brunswick and surrendered after losing hope of being rescued by a French ship. After a few hours, as British ships were beginning rescue operations, she listed and foundered, taking almost half her crew with her. Thus she only bore the name Vengeur du Peuple for a few weeks compared with her 28 years of service as the Marsellois.

The sinking of Vengeur du Peuple was used as propaganda by the National Convention and Bertrand Barère, who gave birth to the legend that the crew had gone down with the ship fighting, rather than surrender. The Scottish historian Thomas Carlyle repeated the tale in his The French Revolution: A History, yielding a rebuttal by Rear-Admiral John Griffiths, who had witnessed the events. Although discredited in naval history circles, the legend lived on as a folk tale, inspiring numerous representations and a fictional account by Jules Verne in his 1870 novel Twenty Thousand Leagues Under the Seas.

== Career ==
The French Navy had lost 29 ships during the Seven Years' War, casualties being particularly high at the Battle of Lagos and the Battle of Quiberon Bay. To replace these losses, in 1761 the Duke of Choiseul launched subscriptions, called don des vaisseaux, whereby French individuals and organisations could donate to the Crown the funds necessary to build and equip a warship. 13 million livres were raised and 18 ships, including two three-deckers, were built and named after their patrons. The Marseillois was funded by the chamber of commerce of Marseille, for 500,000 livres. (Note: Under Louis XVI, a French livre contained 0.29 grammes of pure gold ; this puts Marseillois' worth at 145 kilograms (320 lb) of gold. For a 110-gun ship like Bretagne, the raw wood was already worth 490,000 livres, and the total construction cost amounted to 1,150,000 livres (see Les Européens et les espaces océaniques au XVIIIe siècle, p.17))

Marseillois was ordered on 16 January 1762, originally intended to be built in Toulon on a design by the engineer Joseph-Marie-Blaise Coulomb, and named the same day by Louis XV, following the request of her patrons. The chamber of commerce of Marseille further requested that the ship be built in Marseille, but Coulomb determined that the harbour there was too shallow for the launch of a 74-gun ship, and the order for Marseillois was eventually moved to Toulon. There, lack of timber in the shipyards, which were already busy building Languedoc, Zélé and Bourgogne, delayed the construction of Marseillois until 1764. Her design and building was directed by the engineer Joseph-Véronique-Charles Chapelle.

She was launched on 16 July 1766, and completed quickly, decorated by sculptures carved by Pierre Audibert. After her completion, she was put in reserve, where she would remain for 11 years. On 1 February 1778, Marseillois was hove down for maintenance and repairs of her hull, which was found to be in "very good shape", although her keel had hogged by 38 centimetres (15 in); (Note: not an uncommon figure for ships of the era) maintenance completed two days later, and she was commissioned under Captain Louis-Armand de La Poype de Vertrieu.

=== American Revolutionary War ===
The outbreak of the American Revolutionary War had caused relations between France and Great Britain to deteriorate, and diplomatic ties were broken on 16 March 1778. Admiral Charles Henri Hector, Count of Estaing took command of a fleet of thirteen ships of the line and four frigates in Toulon. Marseillois was assigned to this fleet, the first active service she would see. The fleet set sail on 18 April 1778, crossed Gibraltar on 16 May, and arrived at the mouth of the Delaware River on 8 July.

==== Campaign of 1778–1780, La Poype de Vertrieu ====
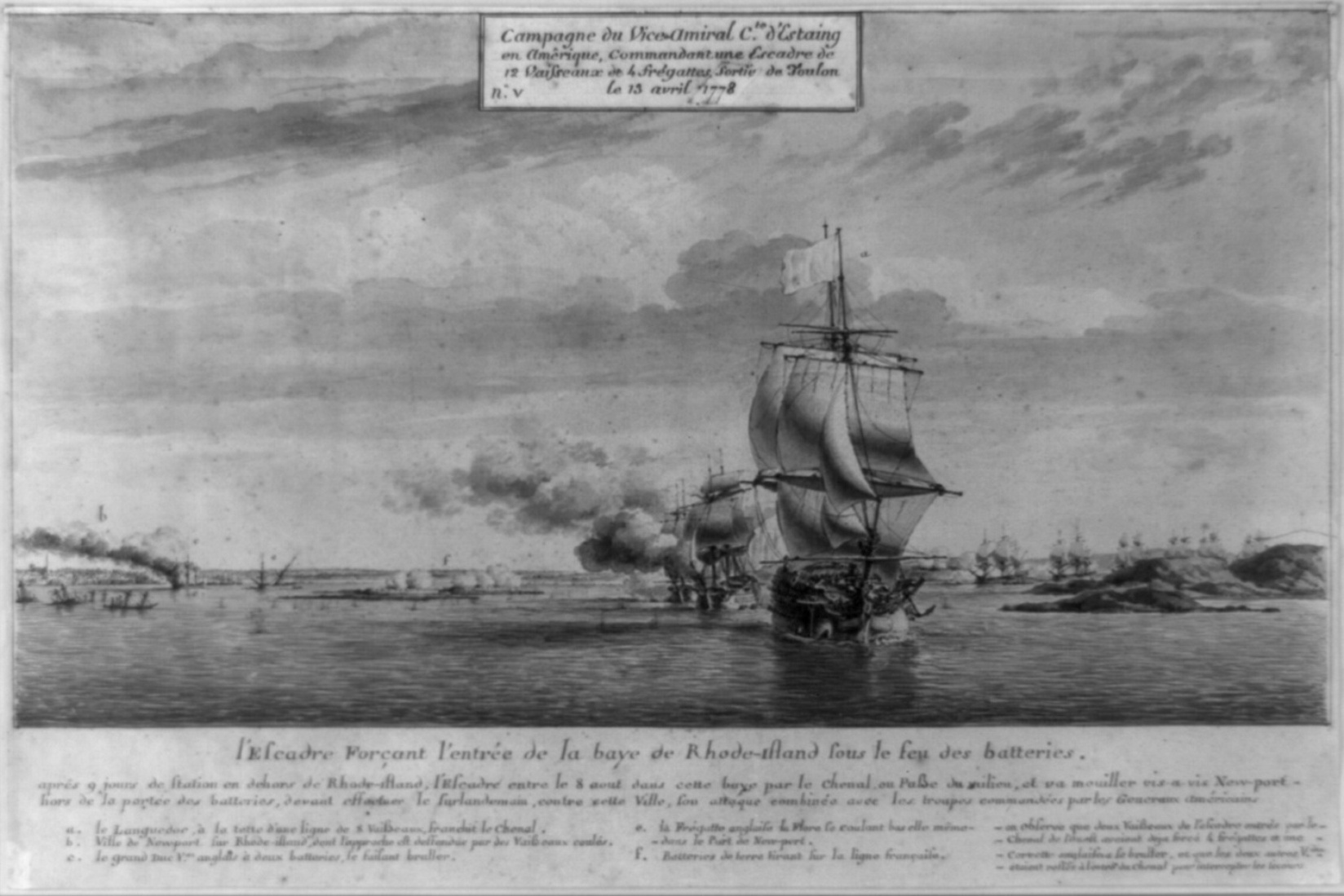
Estaing's fleet arriving at Newport, Rhode Island on 8 August 1778

The French fleet arrived unopposed off New York City on 8 July. British forces there amounted to a fleet of nine smaller ships of the line and two frigates under Admiral Richard Howe; in order to avoid battle with the larger French fleet, Howe retreated under the protection of the strong defences of New York. Estaing wished to press the attack, but his pilots advised that the harbour was too shallow for his ships, so the French fleet spent two weeks at anchor blockading Howe, resupplying and conferring with the Continental Congress. On 22 July, he departed for Newport to join the American Revolutionaries, where he arrived on 28 July and anchored his fleet outside the harbour to better coordinate his attack with that of the Revolutionary land forces. Marseillois anchored in front of the main channel with most of the fleet, while Fantasque, Sagittaire and the frigates blockaded the Sakonnet River, and Protecteur and Provence blocked the Connecticut River.

On 8 August, the French fleet sailed into Newport harbour, Marseillois coming sixth in the line. They had begun to disembark troops the following day when Howe's fleet arrived from New York. Estaing found his anchored ships were now vulnerable to attacks from land batteries, warships and fireships, and cancelled the landing, putting to sea to challenge Howe in battle. Howe's force moved off, pursued by the French. On 11 August the French closed in and the two fleets manoeuvred in preparation for a battle, but around 16:00, a Nor'easter storm broke out, scattering both fleets. Marseillois sustained damage to her rigging, losing her mizzen and her bowsprit, and was cut off from the bulk of the French fleet. The next day, around 20:00, having only just erected jury rigging, she was attacked by the 50-gun HMS Preston, under William Hotham. The two ships duelled indecisively for one hour before parting. Marseillois rejoined the French fleet on 14 August.

Marseillois took part in the Battle of St. Lucia in September, coming third in the French line of battle, and was present at other encounters with the British fleets in the Anglo-French War. The next year, on 6 July 1779, Marseillois took part in the Battle of Grenada, sailing in the rear of the French fleet. Later in the year, she took part in the siege of Savannah, where she was eighth in the line of battle.

The French fleet sustained damage at the siege of Savannah and eventually returned to Europe. Marseillois returned to Toulon with Zélé, Sagittaire, Protecteur, and Experiment. During the campaign, 46 members of her crew had died; of these, only three had been killed in combat.

La Poype de Vertrieu wrote his report and recommendations for the refitting of Marseillois on 24 December 1779; he found her a passable ship, but her high poop hindered her sailing when running, and he recommended improvements to the gun ports of the castles, which were obstructed and allowed only two guns on the quarterdeck and one on the forecastle to be used. Furthermore, substantial repairs on the rigging were needed, and she needed her hull heated to kill worms. La Poype de Vertrieu wrote "it appears that Marseillois shall never be an exceptional sailor, but I am convinced that she will give satisfaction". (Note: Translated from the original: "Il est apparent que Le Marseillois n'aura jamais une marche distinguée, mias je suis persuadé que l'on en sera content quand on le naviguera à trente pouces de différence et que l'on évitera de trop entasser les poids sur son avant." Original quote in Diaz de Soria, Le Marseillois, p. 51.)

==== Campaign of 1780, Albert de Rions ====
After the repairs had been completed, Captain François-Hector d'Albert de Rions was given command of Marseillois. She was appointed to a two-ship squadron under Pierre André de Suffren, who had his flag on Zélé. They set sail on 19 May 1780 to patrol off Portugal, and joined up with a division under Rear-Admiral de Beausset in Cádiz on 17 June. On 6 November, Marseillois departed Cádiz with a joint Franco-Spanish fleet under Estaing, bound for Brest, where she arrived on 3 January 1781.

==== Campaign of 1781–82, Castellane Majastre ====
In Brest, command of Marseillois passed to Captain Henri-César de Castellane Majastre, and she became part of a fleet under Admiral François Joseph Paul de Grasse. Champmartin was the first officer, and a young Pierre-Charles Villeneuve served aboard as an ensign. On 22 March 1781, the fleet sailed for America to reinforce Estaing's forces there, arriving off Martinique on 29 April. There, the fleet met the British forces under Admiral Hood, and the Battle of Fort Royal broke out, an inconclusive long-ranged artillery duel that lasted until the British retreated the next day due to the damage sustained by HMS Intrepid, Centaur and Russell.

De Grasse put to sail on 5 July, bound for Saint-Domingue where he arrived on 16 July. At Cap-Français, the fleet joined with the frigate Concorde, under Captain de Tanouarn, which brought news of the status and plans of the Continental Army. Letters from Washington and Rochambeau requested that de Grasse set sail either to New York, or into Chesapeake Bay. Reinforcing his fleet with a squadron under Admiral de Monteil and with 3,300 soldiers taken from the garrisons of the island, De Grasse decided to sail for the Chesapeake.

On 5 September 1781, the French and British fleets met in the Battle of the Chesapeake. Marseillois was in the van of the French fleet, and exchanged the first shots of the day with the 64-gun HMS Intrepid, under Captain Anthony Molloy. In early April, Marseillois took part in the four-day Battle of the Saintes. She was sailing at the rear of the fleet, and the French and British ships were already trading shots for ten minutes when she took her position in the line of battle. Later in the afternoon, she maintained a position in the line ahead of the flagship Ville de Paris, and supported her until she struck her colours, at which point Admiral de Vaudreuil ordered the fleet to regroup and follow him to Saint-Domingue. The fleet reached Cap-Français in several waves, the main corps arriving on 25 April; Marseillois, along with Hercule, Pluton and Éveillé, arrived on 11 May.

On 25 and 26 January 1782, Marseillois took part in the Battle of Saint Kitts, where she held the 5th position in the line of battle. Marseillois returned to France at some point in 1782, where she was listed on 1 September to be decommissioned.

==== Campaign of 1782–83, Lombard ====
In October 1782, she was hove down and coppered. She was then recommissioned in December 1782 in Brest under Louis-André-Joseph de Lombard, and was part of a two-ship squadron along with Protecteur.

Negotiations for peace with England started in January 1783, and Marseillois was decommissioned in Rochefort on 13 February 1783. She remained in this state until 1794, with some repairs being conducted in 1785 and 1788.

=== French Revolutionary War ===
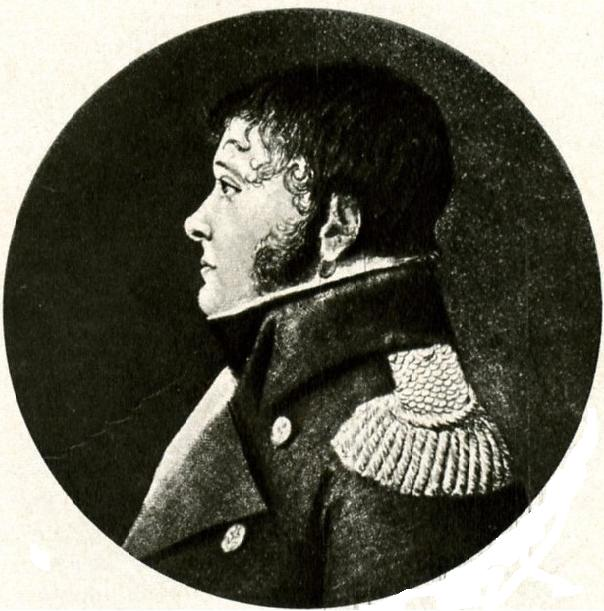
Captain Jean François Renaudin, captain of Vengeur du Peuple

By February 1794 the still decommissioned, Marseillois had been renamed Vengeur du Peuple, probably a response to the participation of the city of Marseille in the Federalist revolts of 1793. She was recommissioned in Rochefort, and on 24 March 1794, Captain Jean François Renaudin took command. On 1 April 1794, she sailed to Île-d'Aix, where she joined up with Pelletier, and on 11 April, the squadron sailed on again, reaching Brest on 18 April, having been joined en route by Jemmapes. Upon their arrival the ships were assigned to the fleet under Admiral Villaret de Joyeuse.

==== Glorious First of June ====
On 16 May 1794, the fleet departed from Brest with the mission of protecting a convoy of ships carrying food to France, beginning the Atlantic campaign of May 1794. On 1 June, the French fleet encountered a British fleet, in an engagement known as the Glorious First of June. Vengeur was third in the French line of battle, after the flagship Montagne and between Achille and Northumberland.

The British fleet approached the French line in an oblique manner, leading to individual engagements as the British ships attempted to break through at several points. Around 9:30, the British flagship HMS Queen Charlotte cut the French line aft of Montagne, firing a devastating raking broadside that killed Montagne's commander, Captain Bazire. The ship astern of Montagne, Jacobin, attempted to prevent Queen Charlotte breaking through by accelerating to close the gap between herself and her flagship; this left a gap behind her, between Jacobin and Achille, that HMS Brunswick, under Captain John Harvey, attempted to exploit to cut the line and assist Queen Charlotte. Achille accelerated and closed the gap, and Brunswick turned her fire against Vengeur, while Achille engaged HMS Ramillies and Valiant.

HMS Brunswick simultaneously engaging Vengeur du Peuple and Achille. By Nicholas Pocock.

Prevented from cutting the French line ahead of Achille, HMS Brunswick turned and tried to cross aft of her, between Achille and Vengeur. Seeing the manoeuvre, Renaudin also accelerated to close this new gap, and Brunswick and Vengeur collided, the anchor of Brunswick becoming entangled in the rigging of Vengeur. Vengeur fired an entire broadside at point-blank range, but was then unable to fire her main batteries again, the ships being so close as to prevent French gunners from ramming ammunition into their guns; in contrast, British gunners used rammers with semi-rigid rope handles instead of wooden handles, and were able to reload and maintain a sustained fire, riddling Vengeur with holes. The fight went on for four hours, until Brunswick, after shattering the rudder of Vengeur to prevent her from manoeuvring, separated at 12:45. Her fire also opened a large hole in the hull of Vengeur.

During the duel between Vengeur and Brunswick, the undamaged HMS Ramillies had approached and put herself in a favourable position to rake Vengeur, and was waiting for Brunswick to separate to open fire. When she did so, Ramillies fired two broadsides, leaving Vengeur with only her foremast standing, which fell half an hour later. Ramillies sustained some damage herself. Soon afterwards, seawater inundated the powder room of Vengeur, denying her all means of defence, and 250 of her crew were out of action. The Trente-et-un Mai closed in around 3:30, attempting to provide assistance, but the proximity of several British sails endangered her so that she eventually sailed away.

Renaudin, seeing the hapless condition of his ship, ordered his flags hoisted half-mast in surrender and distress around 14:00, but after her surrender no British ship managed to get men aboard to take possession. This left Vengeur's few remaining unwounded crew to attempt to salvage what they could. Ultimately the ship's pumps became unmanageable, and Vengeur began to sink. Only the timely arrival of boats from the undamaged HMS Alfred and Culloden, as well as the services of the cutter Rattler, saved any of the Vengeur's crew from drowning, these ships taking off nearly 500 sailors between them. Lieutenant John Winne of Rattler was especially commended for this hazardous work. By 18:15, Vengeur was clearly beyond salvage and only the very worst of the wounded and the dead remained aboard, though some possibly stayed aboard in the hope of being rescued by a French ship rather than a British and avoid captivity.

Alfred rescued about 100 men; Rattler, about 40; and Culloden, 127, including Captain Renaudin, who abandoned his ship and left in the very first British boat. He was taken to Culloden and served a meal in the officers' mess; as he dined with his son and other French and British officers, a commotion was heard; racing to the gallery of Culloden, the party witnessed Vengeur sink with the remaining wounded aboard. Figures of the casualties on Vengeur are not precisely known, but amount to approximately 250 killed during the battle, 106 drowned in the sinking, and 367 rescued by the British. (Note: Cunot (p.432) gives 267 survivors, including Renaudin, his brother and their two sons who served on Vengeur as boys; 250 men killed; and 206 drowned in the wreck.)

== Legacy ==
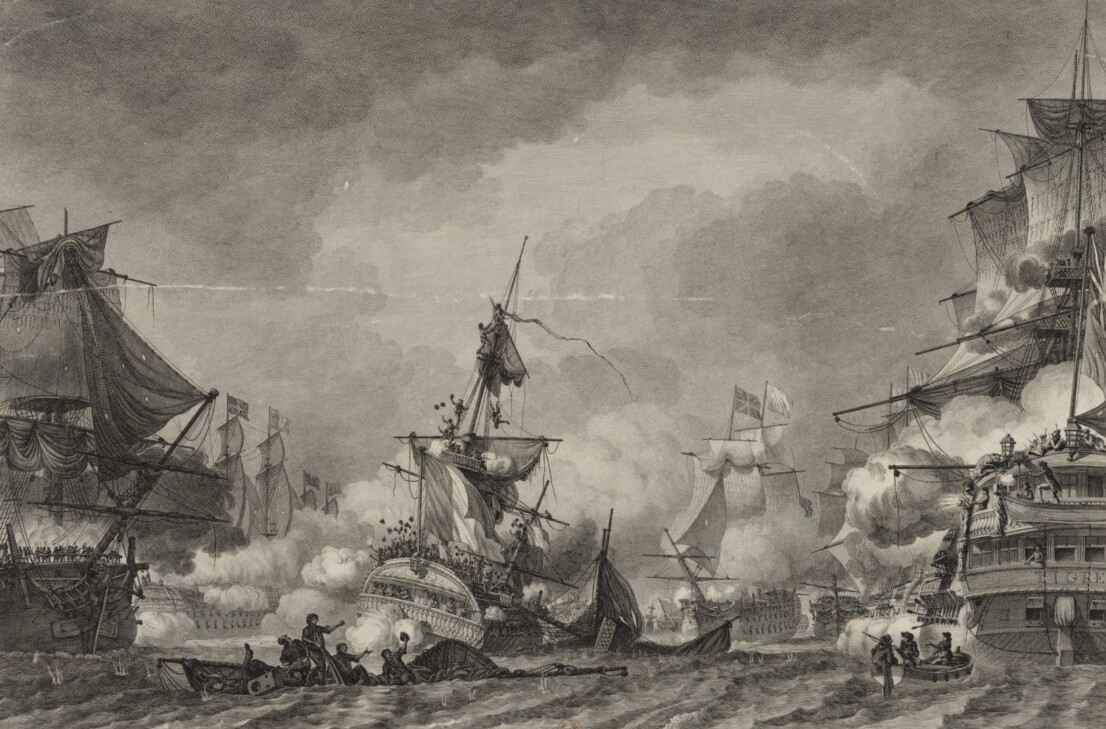
Drawing by Ozanne. Its original caption mentions that the ensign is incorrect and should be white with a tricolour canton. There are further errors: Vengeur still has her mizzen-mast, and the British ship on the right is incorrectly named Tigre.

The sinking of Vengeur du Peuple was exploited for political purposes in France, as several sailors were said to have cried "Vive la Nation, vive la République!" ("Long live the nation, long live the republic") from the bow of the ship as she foundered; this was bloated out of proportion by French politicians, who added that the sailors had waved the tricolour, sung La Marseillaise in defiance, and even continued firing guns until water reached them while the ship foundered, to eventually sink with her rather than surrender. They also extrapolated that the entire crew had disappeared with the Vengeur, a claim disproved by the return of captured crewmembers as they were quickly released from British captivity.

The origin of the legend is a speech made by Bertrand Barère at the National Convention on 21 messidor (9 July), Rapport sur l'héroïsme des Républicains montant le vaisseau le Vengeur, where he claimed that Vengeur had refused to surrender, nailing her flag, and that all the sailors had died with the ship, giving a last shout of "long live the Republic" and waving all sorts of flags and pennants while the ship disappeared.

Lord Howe denies the account entirely, claiming that it never occurred, a position followed by many British sources. Thomas Carlyle originally included the legend in his The French Revolution: A History, prompting Rear-admiral John Griffiths – who, as a lieutenant on HMS Culloden at the time, had been an eyewitness to the sinking – to publicly challenge Carlyle's tale. Carlyle set out to get to the bottom of the story, eventually unearthing the official report of Vengeur's captain, Renaudin. Carlyle concluded that Barère had concocted a "cunningly devised fable", and changed his account of the sinking of the Vengeur in subsequent editions. (Note: In later editions of The French Revolution: A History, Carlyle added a paragraph that dismisses his own previous account. See for instance the Centenary Edition, p.242)

The three most serious reports of the events are the report of Jean François Renaudin, captain of Vengeur, written in captivity on 1 Messidor an II (19 June 1794), signed by Renaudin, Jean Hugine, Louis Rousseau, Pelet, Trouvée, Lussot and others, then in British custody in Tavistock; the report of Cyprien Renaudin, first officer of Vengeur (and cousin to Jean François Renaudin), which was found around 1929 in family archives; and later accounts written in 1838 by Rear-admiral John Griffiths, who had witnessed the event 44 years earlier.

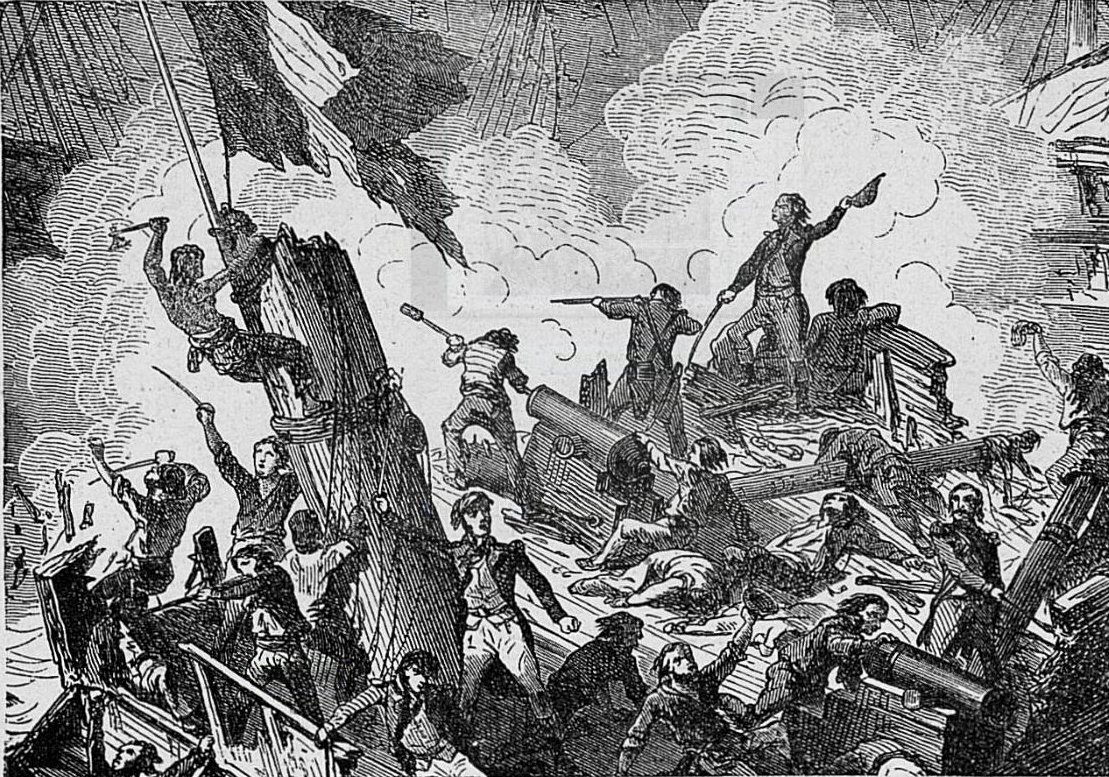
The crew of Vengeur du Peuple nailing the colours. This is an element of the later propaganda surrounding the event, and did not happen historically.

In French drawings, Vengeur is often depicted as flying the Tricolour, which had been recently ordered by the Convention to be flown as battle ensign; however, due to a lack of bunting in Brest, Villaret had not been able to distribute this flag to all his ships, and thus Vengeur probably still flew the white flag with a canton of three equal columns of red, white, and blue.

The notion that the ship would have nailed her flag and never surrendered, as Barère claimed, is never accounted in any of the reports. Though Jean François Renaudin never explicitly states that he surrendered, he does mention that he had his flag flown half-mast in distress when he was surrounded by British ships, indicating that he was requesting assistance from the enemy. Griffiths observes that Vengeur was dismasted to the point that there would have been nothing on which to nail a flag anyway, and James makes mentions of Vengeur hoisting the Union Jack in submission.

The exact cause of the sinking was also the subject of dispute. Barère's account describes Vengeur as sinking from the shots that would have holed her hull; actually, Cyprien Renaudin mentions only two such holes in the lower hull of Vengeur and a noise "like a strong waterfall" at the poop, which he could not identify; this is consistent with James' account of "the Brunswick, by a few well-directed shot, split the Vengeur's rudder, and shattered her stern-post; besides making a large hole in her counter, through which the water rushed in great quantity." In any case, the superstructures were very much battered, prompting Lieutenant Rotheram, of Culloden, to report that he "could not place a two-feet rule in any direction, he thought, that would not touch two shot-holes". Claude Farrère attributes the sinking to ineptitude of the crew who had failed to close damaged lower gunports. The later study conducted by Captain Diaz de Soria in the 1950s suggests that water did enter from the gun ports of the lower battery, ripped off in the collision with Culloden and shattered by artillery fire, and that the crew failed to obstruct them with temporary contrivances. The panicking crew would have aggravated the situation by failing to man the pumps, explaining why it took four hours for Vengeur to sink between her surrender around 14:00 until her sinking between 18:00 and 18:30.

The most debated point is the patriotic shouts, sometimes claimed to have been accompanied by singing of the Marseillaise. These shouts are denied entirely by Griffiths, but are mentioned in French accounts. Renaudin's report does claim that sailors shouted "Vive la République", but that it was in desperation for being unable to reach the British craft; it does not mention any particular defiance in the intent, though, nor does it mention flags or La Marseillaise; this position is followed by Troude and Farrère. Guérin proposes a variation, that knowing themselves doomed, the sailors remaining on Vengeur made a last display of patriotic and political fervour before dying. William James provides an alternative theory when he suggests that any person who behaved in such a manner on the stricken ship was acting under the influence of alcohol; Troude, otherwise very critical of Barère's account, vehemently dismissed this idea.

Captain Renaudin was said in a naval registry to have swum to safety. He had in fact abandoned his ship with the first British boat, leaving his men behind in disregard for military customs and the 1765 standing order that Captains had to be last to abandon ship, (Note: Guérin (vol.6, p.46) suggests that Renaudin left his ship as a sign that he was surrendering her to the custody of the British.) and though his account insinuates that he was on a boat close to Vengeur when she foundered, he was actually dining in the mess of Culloden at the moment of the sinking. In 1795, Loutherbourg depicted the rescue of Vengeur's crew by British ships in his large canvas of the battle, Lord Howe's action, or the Glorious First of June.

=== Contemporary reactions in France ===
Le Chant des Victoires (extract)

Rise, emerge from the deep seas,
smoking cadaver of Vengeur!
You who saw the French vanquish
the English, the fires and the waves!
Where do these shrieks come from?
What are these magnanimous voices?
They are the brave dying
Singing from the depth
Glory to the French people!

— Chenier (Note: Lève-toi, sors des mers profondes, Cadavre fumant du Vengeur ! Toi qui vis les Français vainqueurs Des Anglais, des feux et des ondes ! D'où partent ces cris déchirants ? Quelles sont ces voix magnanimes ? Ce sont les braves expirants Qui chantent au fond des abîmes : Gloire au peuple français !)

The speech of 9 July by Barère at the National Convention inflamed the nation, and as it specifically encouraged artists to exalt the story, poets like Ponce Denis Écouchard Lebrun and Marie-Joseph Chénier composed eulogies to commemorate the event, wrote new words for existing songs, and even produced a three-act opera.

Barère had the following decree passed at the National Convention on 21 June 1794:

Art. 1. A hull model of the ship of the line Vengeur shall be hanged from the dome of the Pantheon, and the names of the brave republicans who constituted the crew of this ship will be inscribed on the column of the Pantheon

2. To this effect, naval agents of the harbours of Brest and Rochefort shall without delay send the crew list of the ship Vengeur.
3. The three-decker ship of the line, currently under construction in the covered basin of Brest, shall bear the name of Vengeur (Note: Laid down as Peuple, the ship would be launched as Vengeur in 1803.) The commissary to the Navy shall give the swiftest orders to accelerate the construction of this ship.

4. The National Convention calls for artists, painters, sculptors and poets to concourse to transmit to posterity the sublime trait of republican dedication of the citizen who composed the crew of Vengeur. Rewards will be attributed in a national holiday to painters and poets who will have the most worthily celebrated the glory of these republicans. (Note: Art. 1. Une forme du vaisseau de ligne le Vengeur sera suspendue à la voûte du Panthéon, et les noms des braves républicains composant l'équipage de ce vaisseau, seront inscrits sur la colonne du Panthéon.: 2. A cet effet les agens maritimes des ports de Brest et Rochefort enverront sans délai le rôle d'équipage du vaisseau le Vengeur.; 3. Le vaisseau à trois ponts, qui est en construction dans le bassin couvert de Brest, portera le nom de Vengeur. Le commissaire de la marine donnera les ordres les plus prompts pour accélérer la construction de ce vaisseau.; 4. La convention nationale appelle les artistes, peintres, sculpteurs, et poètes, à concourir pour transmettre à la postérité le trait sublime du dévoûment républicain des citoyens formant l'équipage de Vengeur. Il sera décerné dans une fête nationale, des récompenses aux peintres, et aux poètes, qui auront le plus dignement célébré la gloire de ces républicains.)

The reappearance of the purportedly sunk crew, and the Thermidorian Reaction, prevented the completion of this programme.

Captain Renaudin was posthumously promoted to counter admiral on 29 August 1794; he was later exchanged for the captain of HMS Thames, Captain James Cotes. On 10 September 1794, Jean-Jacques Bréard declared before the convention:

I am very pleased to tell the Convention that the whole of the crew of Vengeur did not perish (applause). The captain has returned to Brest and has been promoted to the command of the Jemmapes. On this ship, he hopes to repair the loss of Vengeur (applause).

In spite of these facts, the myth lived on: in his Histoire de la révolution française, Adolphe Thiers wrote an account repeating Barère's version, where Vengeur refused to surrender. In 1847 Alphonse de Lamartine even invented the story that Renaudin had been killed heroically, cut in half by a cannon shot like Dupetit-Thouars.

Some reports however indicate that the legend was not seriously accepted: Carlyle suggests one near-eyewitness French account amounted to "not a recantation of an impudent amazing falsehood, but to some vague faint murmur or whimper of admission that it is probably false". Captain Diaz de Soria relates the story, probably apocryphal, that in 1840, the Prince of Joinville, while decorating the purported last survivor of Vengeur, would have told him "we do this for the legend, my good man: nations, after all, live only of legends". In 1857, Guérin wrote "one wonders how, after that, history could remain so credulous". (Note: "On se demande comment, après cela, l'histoire a pu rester si crédule". By "that" ("cela"), Guérin refers to the reappearance of the crew of Vengeur, reported sunk with their ship.)

Depictions of the sinking of the Vengeur du Peuple
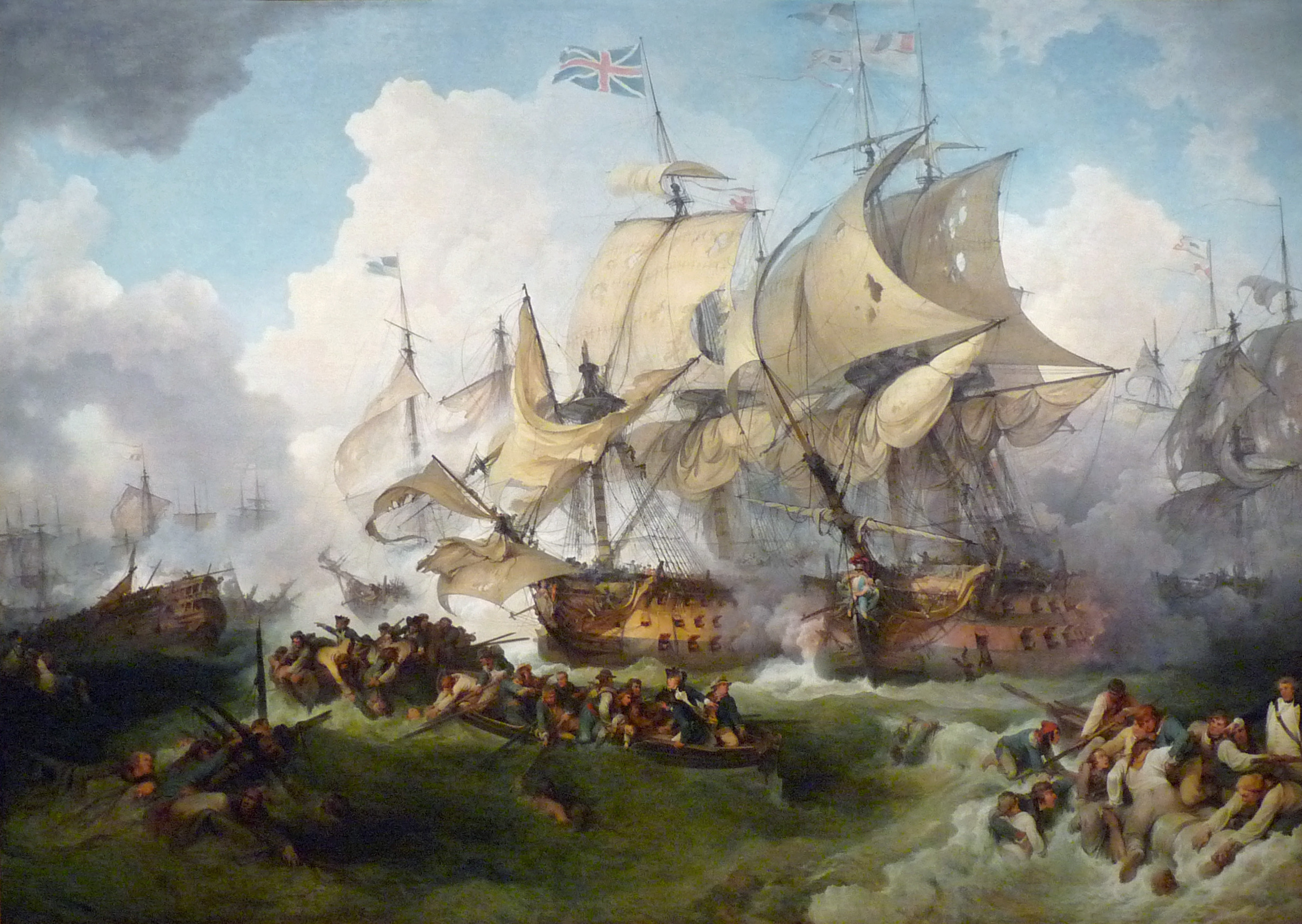
British depiction: Lord Howe's action, or the Glorious First of June, by Loutherbourg – the Vengeur du Peuple is sinking in the left foreground.

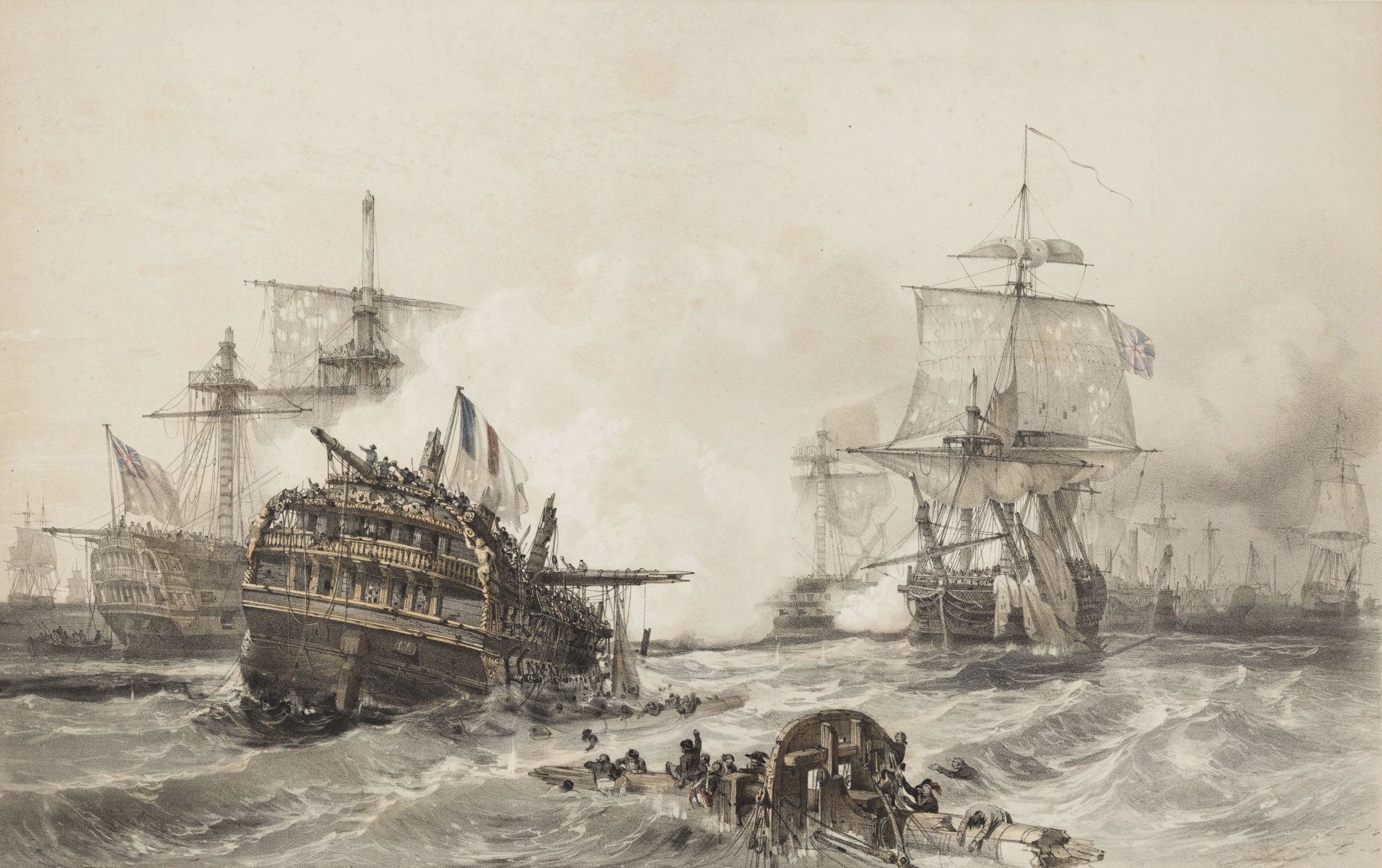
Later French depiction of the mid-19th century, by Mayer (1805–1890). Vengeur is seen listing on the wrong side.

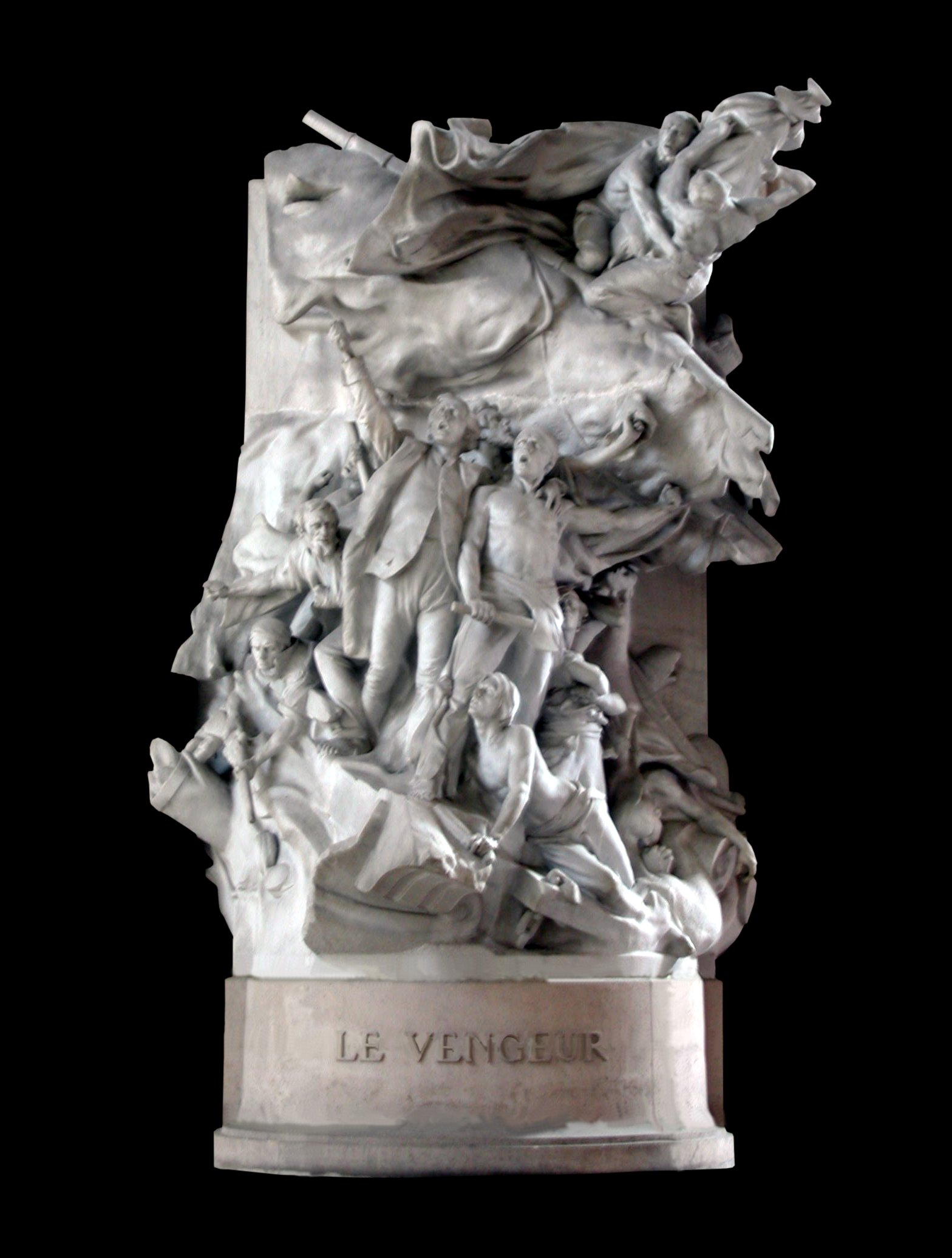
1908 sculpture by Ernest Dubois (1863–1930), on display at the Panthéon

=== Jules Verne's depiction ===
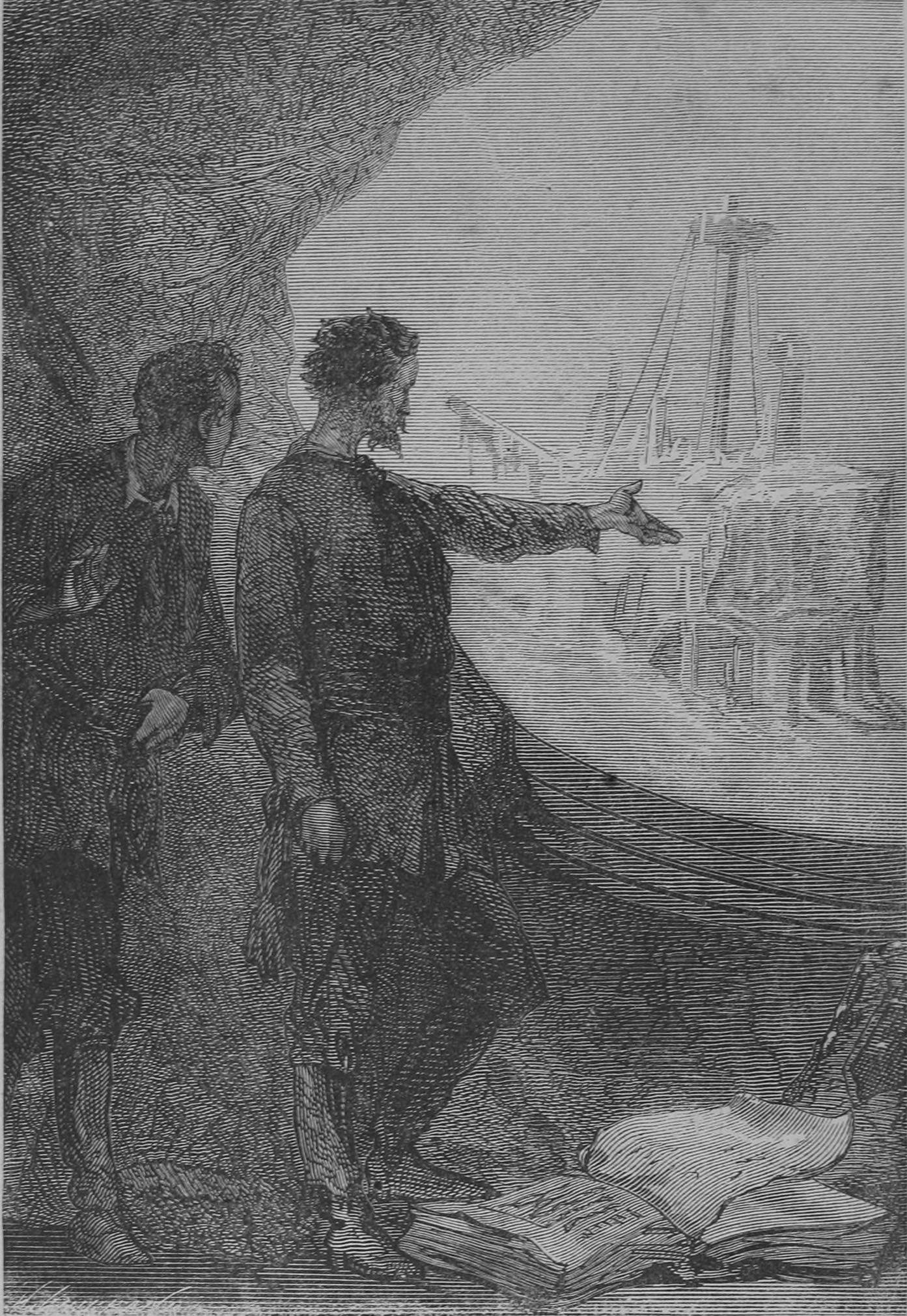
Captain Nemo showing the wreck of Vengeur du Peuple to professor Aronax

In Twenty Thousand Leagues Under the Seas, published in 1870, Jules Verne reported the incident with its revolutionary slant:

What was this ship? Why did Nautilus come to visit her grave? Was it then not an accidental wreck that had taken the ship under the waters?

I did not know what to think, when, close to me, I heard Captain Nemo say in a slow voice:
Once this ship was named Marseillais. She bore 74 guns and was launched in 1762. In 1778, on 13 August, under La Poype-Vertrieux, she fought audaciously against Preston. In 1779, on 4 July, she saw with Admiral d’Estaing squadron the capture of Grenada. In 1781, on 5 September, she took part in the fight of Count de Grasse in the bay of Chesapeake. In 1794, the French Republic changed her name. On 16 April of the same year, she joined in Brest the squadron under Villaret-Joyeuse, in charge of escorting a convoy of wheat inbound from American under Admiral Van Stabel. On 11 and 12 prairial, year II, the squadron met with English ships. Sir, today is the 13 prairial, the 1st of June 1868. Seventy-four years ago, on that exact day, at this very place, by 47°24' of latitude and 17°28' of longitude, this ship, after a heroic fight, dismasted of all her three masts, water in her hull, a third of her crew hors de combat, preferred to founder with her three hundred fifty-six sailors than to surrender, and nailing her flag to her aft, she disappeared under the waves at the cry of "Long live the Republic!
— The Vengeur! I exclaimed.

— Yes! sir. The Vengeur! A beautiful name", murmured Captain Nemo while crossing his arms.

=== Models ===
At least two models of Vengeur du Peuple are known. One, a scrimshaw model crafted by a prisoner of war, is on display at Vancouver Maritime Museum.

The other is a 1/55th arsenal model realised by master Boubénec between 1951 and 1952, under the direction of Captain Diaz de Soria. It was built from the plans of the hull and rafter of the ship, though sculptures were undocumented and had to be reconstituted from drawings. It is currently on display at the Musée de la Marine et de l'Économie de Marseille.

== Notes and references ==
=== Bibliography ===
- Barère, Bertrand (1794). Rapport sur l'héroïsme des Républicains montant le vaisseau le Vengeur (in French).
- Barthélemy, Charles (1876). Erreurs et mensonges historiques (in French). Vol. 4. Paris: Charles Blériot, éditeur.
- Béranger, Jean (1997). "Le vaisseau de ligne". Les Européens et les espaces océaniques au XVIIIe siècle: actes du colloque de 1997 (in French). Presses Paris Sorbonne. ISBN 2840500833.
- Carlyle, Thomas (1838). The French Revolution: a History. Vol. 2. p. 391.
- Carlyle, Thomas (1840). Critical and miscellaneous essays. Vol. 5. London: James Fraser.
- Carlyle, Thomas (2010). The Works of Thomas Carlyle. Vol. 6. New York: Cambridge University Press. ISBN 978-1108022521.
- Contenson, Ludovic (1934). La Société des Cincinnati de France et la guerre d'Amérique (1778-1783). Paris: éditions Auguste Picard. OCLC 7842336.
- Diaz de Soria, Ollivier-Zabulon (1954). Le Marseillois, devenu plus tard le Vengeur du peuple (in French). F. Robert et fils.
- Ducis, Jean-François; Chénier, André (1839). "Le Chant des Victoires". Œuvres de J.F. Ducis, suivies de M.J. de Chénier (in French). Vol. 2. Paris: Ledentu. p. 691.
- Écouchard-Lebrun, Ponce-Denis. Ode sur le vaisseau Le Vengeur (in French).
- Farrère, Claude (1956). Histoire de la Marine française (in French). Paris: Flammarion.
- Guérin, Léon (1857). Histoire maritime de France (in French). Vol. 6. Dufour et Mulat. pp. 45–46.
- Guérin, Léon (1855). Histoire de la marine contemporaine de France: depuis 1784 jusqu'à 1848 (in French). A. Delahays.
- James, William (2002) [1827]. The Naval History of Great Britain, Volume 1, 1793–1796. London: Conway Maritime Press. ISBN 0-85177-905-0. OCLC 165702223.
- Jane, Fred T. (1997) [reprint of 1912]. The British Battle-Fleet. Conway Maritime Press. ISBN 0-85177-723-6.
- Mahan, Alfred Thayer (1918). The Influence of Sea Power upon History, 1660–1783. Little, Brown and Company.
- Morrissey, Brendan (1997). Yorktown 1781: the World Turned Upside Down. London: Osprey Publishing. p. 55. ISBN 978-1-85532-688-0.
- Lamartine, Alphonse. Histoire des Girondins. Vol. 2.
- Levot, Prosper (1866). Les gloires maritimes de la France: notices biographiques sur les plus célèbres marins (in French). Bertrand.
- Moline, Pierre-Louis (1794). Le naufrage héroïque du vaisseau Le Vengeur, opéra en trois actes (in French).
- Roche, Jean-Michel (2005). Dictionnaire des bâtiments de la flotte de guerre française de Colbert à nos jours. Vol. 1. Group Retozel-Maury Millau. ISBN 978-2-9525917-0-6. OCLC 165892922.
- Tracy, Nicholas (1998). The Naval Chronicle, Volume 1, 1793–1798. Chatham Publishing. ISBN 1-86176-091-4.
- Thiers, Adolphe (1836). Histoire de la révolution française (in French). Vol. 10. A. Wahlen.
- Troude, Onésime-Joachim (1867). Batailles navales de la France (in French). Vol. 2. Challamel ainé.
- Verne, Jules (1870). "20". Vingt mille Lieues sous les Mers (in French). J. Hetzel. pp. 407–415.
- "Couplets sur la fin héroïque et courageuse de l'équipage du vaisseau le Vengeur". Chansonnier de la République pour l'an III (in French).
