= Battle of St. Lucia =

1778 battle of the American Revolutionary War

- Part of the American Revolutionary War and the Anglo-French War (1778–1783)
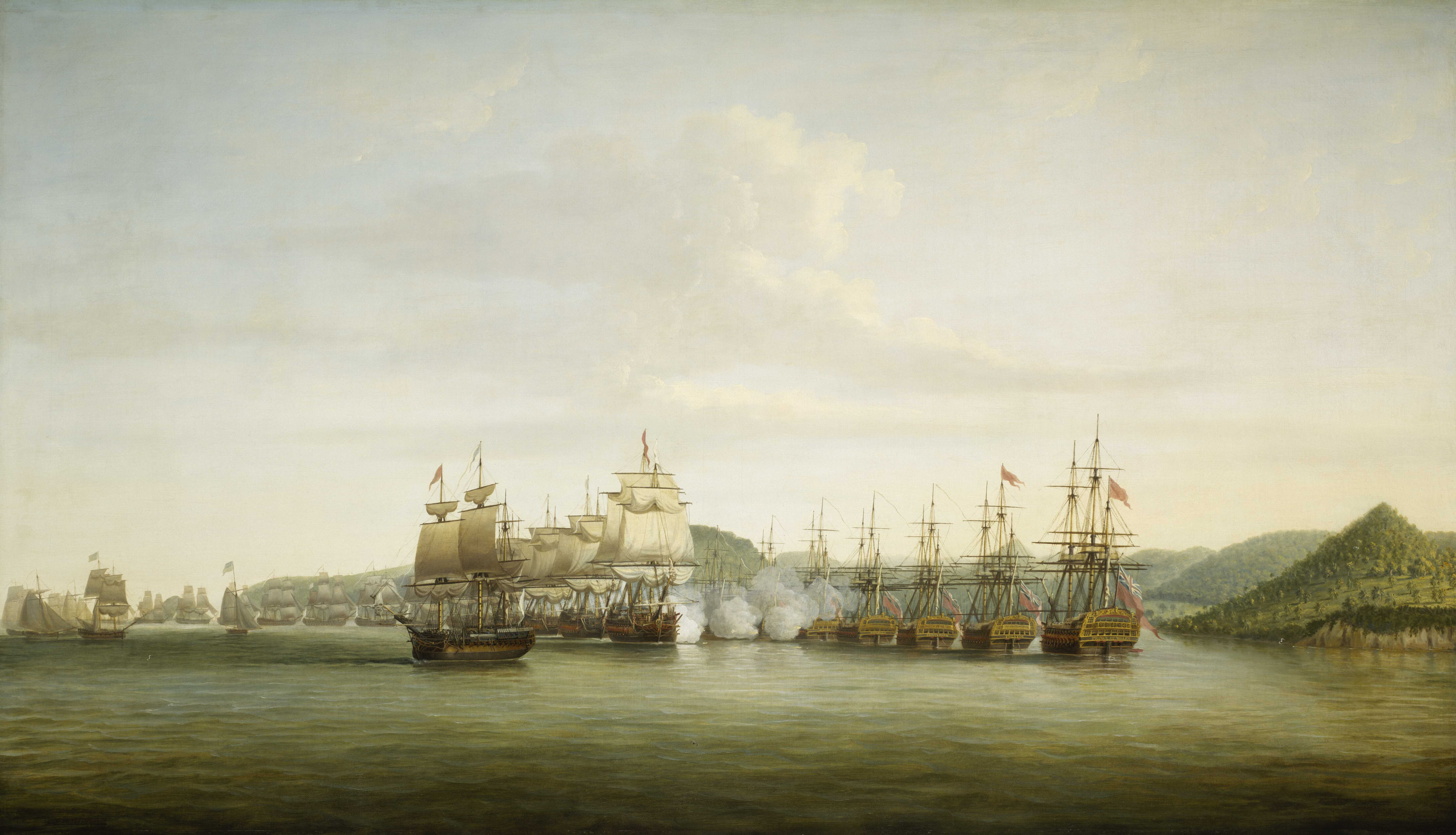
- Barrington's Action at St Lucia, 15 December 1778; Dominic Serres, 1780
Date	15 December 1778
Location	Off Saint Lucia, Caribbean Sea 14°01′01″N 60°58′59″W
Result	British victory

Belligerents
Great Britain	France

Commanders and leaders
Samuel Barrington	Count of Estaing

Strength
7 ships of the line 3 frigates	12 ships of the line 4 frigates

Casualties and losses
230 killed or wounded	850 killed or wounded
- Location within the Caribbean

The Battle of St. Lucia or the Battle of the Cul de Sac was a naval battle fought off the island of St. Lucia in the West Indies during the American Revolutionary War on 15 December 1778, between the Royal Navy and the French Navy.

== Background ==
The French had entered the American Revolutionary War on behalf of the rebels and were conducting actions in the Caribbean to try to take over British colonies there. On 7 September 1778, the French governor of Martinique, the marquis de Bouillé, surprised and captured the British island of Dominica. On 4 November, French Admiral Charles Henri Hector, Count of Estaing sailed for the West Indies from the port of Boston, Massachusetts. On that same day, Commodore William Hotham was dispatched from Sandy Hook, New Jersey, to reinforce the British fleet in the West Indies. Hotham sailed with "five men of war, a bomb vessel, some frigates, and a large convoy." The convoy Hotham was escorting consisted of 59 transports carrying 5,000 British soldiers under Major General Grant. The French fleet was blown off course by a violent storm, preventing it from arriving in the Caribbean ahead of the British. Rear-Admiral of the Red Samuel Barrington, the British naval commander stationed on the Leeward Islands, joined the newly arrived Commodore Hotham on 10 December at the island of Barbados. Grant's men were not permitted to disembark and spent the next several days aboard their transports. Barrington and Hotham sailed for the island of St. Lucia on the morning of 12 December.

On the evening of 13 December and morning of 14 December, Major General James Grant, supported by additional troops under Brigadier General William Medows and Brigadier General Robert Prescott, landed at Grand Cul de Sac, St. Lucia. Grant and Prescott took control of the high ground around the bay, while Medows continued on and took Vigie the following morning (14 December). On 14 December Estaing's fleet arrived, forcing Barrington to move his ships into line of battle and forgo his plan of moving the transports into Carénage Bay.

== Battle ==
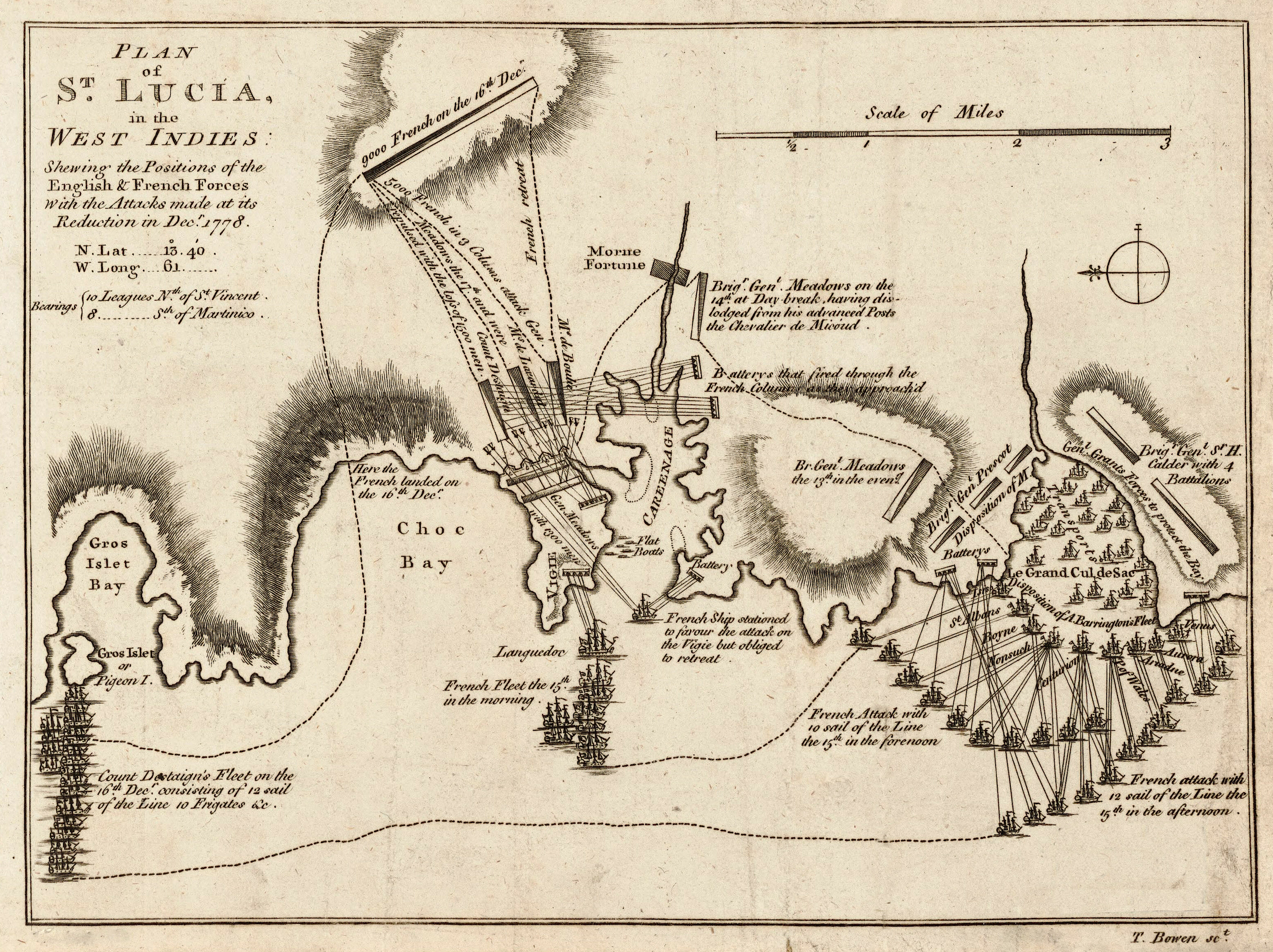
Map of the battle

Barrington was alerted to the presence of the French fleet by the frigate Ariadne and organised his line of battle so that Isis and his three frigates (Venus, Aurora, and Ariadne) were close to shore guarding the windward approach, and he placed his flagship, Prince of Wales, toward the leeward. Barrington, in a defensive strategy, placed his transports inside the bay but behind his battle line, which took him the entire evening of 14 December. By 1100 hours the next day, most of the transports had been safely tucked behind his line.

At 1100 hours 15 December Estaing approached St. Lucia with ten ships of the line, and was fired on by one of the shore batteries. Estaing moved to engage Barrington from the rear, and a "warm conflict" raged between the two fleets, with the British supported by two shore batteries. Estaing was repulsed but succeeded in reforming his line of battle. At 4:pm Estaing renewed his assault by attacking Barrington's centre with 12 ships of the line. Again, heavy fire was exchanged, and the French were eventually repulsed for a second time.

== Outcome ==
On 16 December Estaing appeared to be preparing for a third assault against Barrington's line, but then sailed away towards the windward. On the evening of 16 December Estaing anchored in Gros Islet Bay, where he landed 7,000 troops for an assault on the British lines at La Vigie. Three assaults were made but British control of the high ground enabled them to repulse the French. The French troops were re-embarked, and when Estaing's fleet left on 29 December, the island surrendered to the British.

== Order of battle ==
=== French line of battle ===
Vice-amiral d'Estaing' squadron
Division	Ship	Type	Commander	Casualties			Notes
Division	Ship	Type	Commander	Killed	Wounded	Total	Notes
	Zélé	74	Barras Saint-Laurent				
	Tonnant	80	Bruyères-Chalabre (flag captain); Breugnon (Lieutenant général)				
	Marseillais	74	La Poype-Vertrieux				
	Languedoc	80	Boulainvilliers (flag captain); Estaing (Vice-amiral)				
	Hector	74	Moriès-Castellet				
	César	74	Castellet (flag captain) (WIA); Broves (chef d'escadre)				
	Fantasque	64	Suffren				
	Guerrier	74	Bougainville				
	Protecteur	74	Saint-Germain d'Apchon				
	Vaillant	64	Chabert-Cogolin				
	Provence	64	Desmichels de Champorcin				
	Sagittaire	50	Albert de Rions				
Reconnaissance and signals
	Chimère	32-gun frigate	Cresp de Saint-Césaire				
	Engageante	26-gun frigate	Gras-Préville				
	Alcmène	26-gun frigate	Bonneval				
	Aimable	26-gun frigate	Saint-Eulalie				

=== British line of battle ===
Ship	Rate	Guns	Commander
HMS Prince of Wales	Third rate	74	Rear-Admiral of the Red Samuel Barrington; Captain Benjamin Hill
HMS Boyne	Third rate	70	Captain Herbert Sawyer
HMS Preston	Fourth rate	50	Commodore William Hotham; Captain Samuel Uppleby
HMS St Albans	Third rate	64	Captain Richard Onslow
HMS Nonsuch	Third rate	64	Captain Walter Griffith
HMS Centurion	Fourth rate	50	Captain Richard Braithwaite
HMS Isis	Fourth rate	50	Captain John Raynor
HMS Venus	Fifth rate	36	Captain James Ferguson
HMS Aurora	Sixth rate	28	Captain James Cumming
HMS Ariadne	Sixth rate	20	Captain Thomas Pringle
