= Battle of Grenada =

1779 battle of the American Revolutionary War

- Part of the American Revolutionary War and the Anglo-French War (1778–1783)
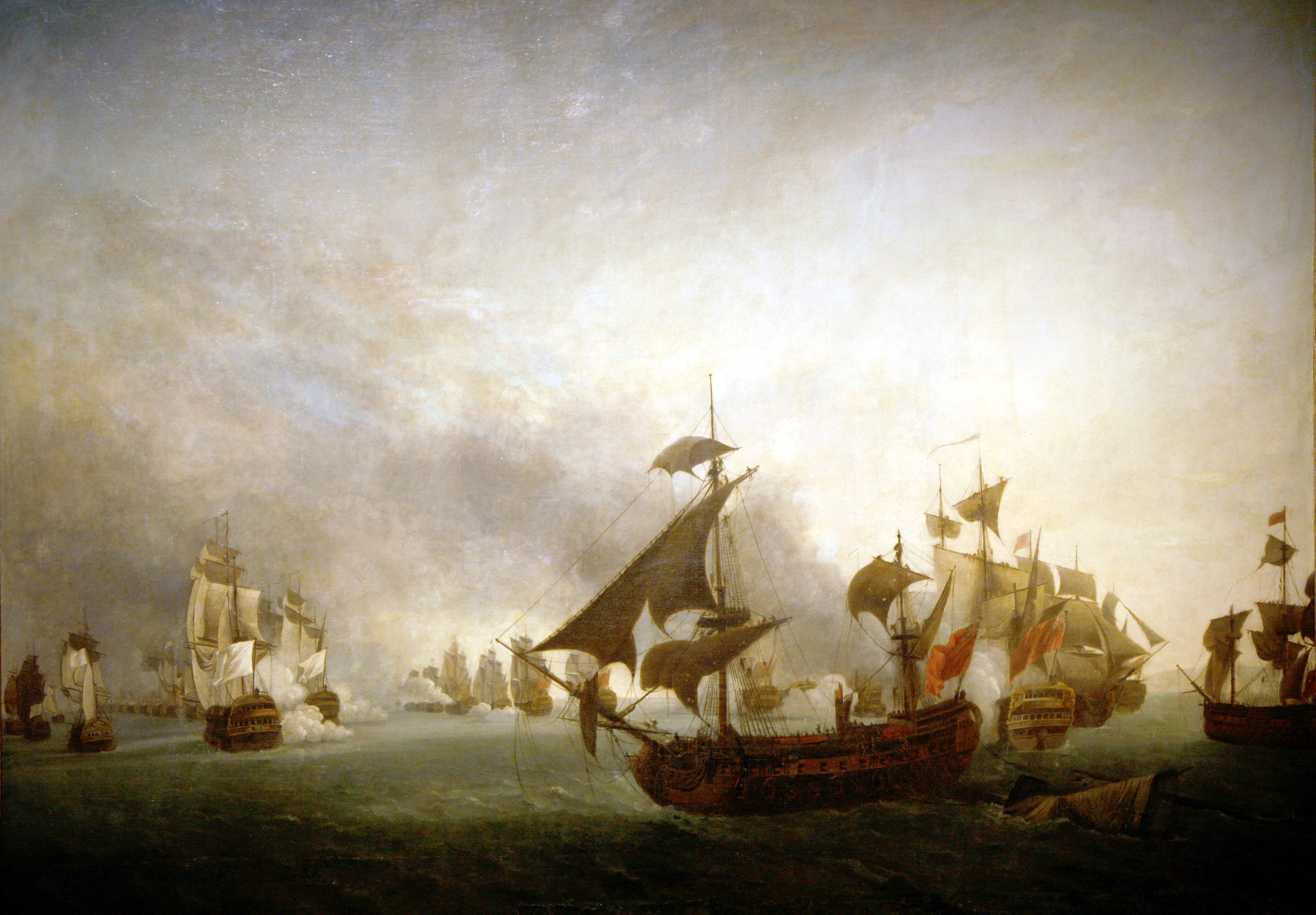
- 1789 painting of the battle
Date	6 July 1779
Location	Off Grenada, Caribbean Sea 12.05°N 61.75°W
Result	French victory

Belligerents
France	Great Britain

Commanders and leaders
(Kingdom of France) Count of Estaing	(Kingdom of Great Britain) John Byron

Strength
25 ships of the line 2 frigates	21 ships of the line 1 post ship

Casualties and losses
173 killed 773 wounded	183 killed 346 wounded

The Battle of Grenada took place on 6 July 1779 during the American Revolutionary War in the West Indies between the British Royal Navy and the French Navy, just off the coast of Grenada. A British fleet led by Admiral John Byron (the grandfather of Lord Byron) had sailed in an attempt to relieve Grenada, which French forces under Charles Henri Hector, Count of Estaing had just captured.

Incorrectly believing he had numerical superiority, Byron ordered a general chase to attack the French as they left their anchorage at Grenada. Because of the disorganized attack and the French Navy's numerical superiority, Byron's fleet was badly mauled in the encounter, although no ships were lost on either side. Naval historian Alfred Thayer Mahan described the battle as "the most disastrous... that the British Navy had encountered since Beachy Head, in 1690."

== Background ==
Following the entry of France into the American War of Independence as an American ally in early 1778, French Admiral Charles Henri Hector, Count of Estaing arrived in the West Indies in early December 1778 in command of a fleet consisting of 12 ships of the line and a number of smaller vessels. At about the same time, a British fleet under Admiral William Hotham also arrived, augmenting the fleet of Admiral Samuel Barrington. The British then captured French-held St. Lucia, despite Estaing's attempt at relief. The British used St. Lucia to monitor the major French base at Martinique, where Estaing was headquartered.

The British fleet was further reinforced in January 1779 by ten ships of the line under Admiral John Byron, who assumed command of the British Leeward Islands station. Throughout the first half of 1779, both fleets received further reinforcements, after which the French fleet was slightly superior to that of the British. Furthermore, Byron departed St. Lucia on 6 June in order to provide escort services to British merchant ships gathering at St. Kitts for a convoy to Europe, leaving Estaing free to act. Estaing and Governor François Claude Amour, marquis de Bouillé seized the opportunity to begin a series of operations against nearby British possessions.

Their first target, the isle of Saint Vincent, fell on 18 June, and Estaing turned his attention to other islands. He had hoped to capture the key British possession, Barbados, but after making no progress against the prevailing easterly trade winds, he turned his attention instead to Grenada. The French fleet arrived off Grenada on 2 July, and stormed its main defences beginning late on 3 July. Terms of capitulation were agreed on 4 July. On the way, the French squadron met the 50-gun Fier Rodrigue, under Chevalier de Montault, a letter of marque belonging to Beaumarchais and escorting a convoy. They commandeered Fier Rodrigue, and she took a place in the French line of battle.

Byron had been alerted to the French action at Saint Vincent, and was sailing with a force to recapture it. When news arrived that the French were at Grenada, he immediately changed course to meet them. The British fleet consisted of 21 ships of the line and 1 frigate. Because he was escorting troop transports and was short of frigates, three ships of the line were assigned duty to escort the transports. Estaing was warned on July 5 of Byron's approach, and promptly reembarked most of his troops. His fleet consisted of 25 ships of the line and a large number of frigates and smaller vessels. Byron was unaware of Estaing's full strength, since during his absence Estaing had been reinforced by a squadron from Europe under Toussaint-Guillaume Picquet de la Motte.

== Battle ==
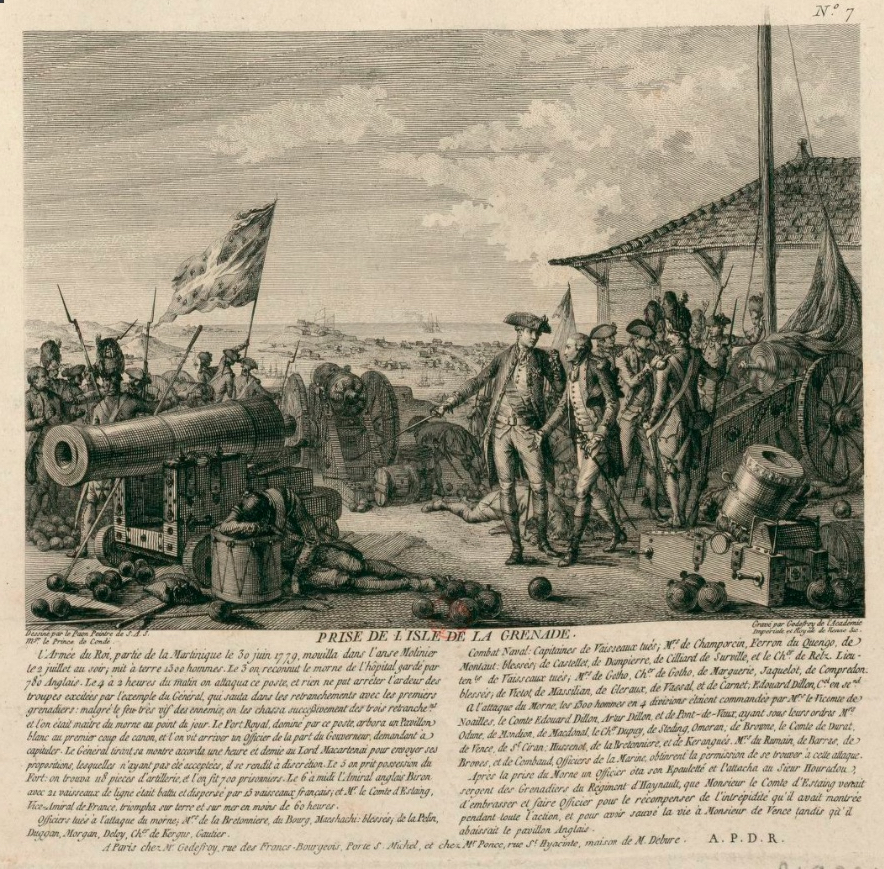
The capture of Grenada by Estaing's troops

The French were anchored off St. George's Town on the southwest of the island, and the British approached during the night. Estaing weighed anchor at 4:00 am when the British fleet was spotted, ordering his ships to form a line of battle in order of speed (that is, without regard to the usual sailing order), heading roughly northward. This masked the true strength of the French fleet as each ship left the cluster at the anchorage. Believing his force to be superior, Byron gave the order for general chase, approaching the anchorage from the northeast.

When Byron finally became aware of the full French strength, he attempted to reform a battle line. As a result, the British attack was disordered and confused. Fame, Lion and two other ships got separated from the main body and were very badly mauled. Lion was forced to run downwind to Jamaica to avoid capture. The French lost no ships and eventually hauled off. The British lost 183 killed and 346 wounded. Fame had four killed and nine wounded. The French lost 190 killed and 759 wounded.

== Aftermath ==
Estaing returned to Grenada to make repairs while Byron made for St. Kitts to do the same. The French admiral failed to capitalise on his superior strength to launch further attacks in the West Indies. Byron returned home in August. Estaing, after co-operating unsuccessfully with the Americans in an attack on Savannah in September also returned to Europe.

The action was a stepping stone into a career in the French Navy for Honoré Joseph Antoine Ganteaume, then 22, who served as an auxiliary officer on Fier Rodrigue, who eventually rose to vice admiral.

== Order of battle ==
=== French fleet ===
Estaing's fleet
Division	Ship	Type	Commander	Casualties			Notes
Division	Ship	Type	Commander	Killed	Wounded	Total	Notes
Escadre blanche et bleue (vanguard)
	Zélé	74	Captain Jacques-Melchior Saint-Laurent, Comte de Barras				
	Fantasque	64	Captain Pierre André de Suffren	22	43	65	First officer Campredon killed.
	Magnifique	74	Captain François-Louis de Brach				
	Tonnant	80	Lieutenant-General Pierre-Claude Haudeneau de Breugnon; Captain Bruyères-Chalabre				Division and Squadron flagship
	Protecteur	74	Captain Étienne de Grasse-Limermont				
	Fier	74	Captain Jean-Baptiste Turpin du Breuil				
	Provence	64	Captain Victor-Louis Desmichels de Champorcin †				Joseph-François-Félix Garnier de Saint-Antonin assumed command
Escadre blanche (centre)
	Fendant	74	Captain Louis-Philippe de Rigaud, Marquis de Vaudreuil				
	Artésien	64	Captain Antoine de Thomassin de Peynier				
	Fier-Rodrigue	50	Captain Montault †				
	Hector	74	Captain Pierre de Moriès-Castellet				
	Languedoc	80	Vice-Admiral Charles Henri Hector, Count of Estaing; Captain Henri-Louis de Boulainvilliers de Croy				Division, Squadron and Fleet flagship
	Robuste	74	Chef d'Escadre François Joseph Paul de Grasse				
	Vaillant	64	Captain Joseph-Bernard de Chabert-Cogolin				
	Sagittaire	50	Captain François Hector d'Albert de Rions				
	Guerrier	74	Captain Louis Antoine de Bougainville				
Escadre bleue (rear)
	Sphinx	64	Captain Claude-René Pâris de Soulanges				
	Diadème	74	Captain Charles Picot de Dampierre (WIA)				
	Amphion	50	Captain Ferron de Quengo †				
	Marseillais	74	Captain Louis-Armand de La Poype de Vertrieux				
	César	74	Chef d'Escadre Jean-Joseph de Rafélis de Broves; Captain Jean-Baptiste de Moriès de Castellet (WIA)				Division and Squadron flag
	Vengeur	64	Captain Jean-Georges du Croiset de Retz (WIA)				
	Réfléchi	64	Captain Armand-François Cillart de Suville (WIA)				
	Annibal	74	Chef d'Escadre Toussaint-Guillaume Picquet de la Motte	59	90	149	
Reconnaissance and signals
	Alcmène	26	Captain Pierre-René-Bénigne-Mériadec de Bonneval				
	Aimable	26	Captain Antoine-Stanislas de Curières de Castelnau Saint-Cosme Sainte-Eulalie				
Total losses: 173 killed, 773 wounded, 949 total

=== British fleet ===
Byron's fleet
Ship	Guns	Commander	Casualties			Notes
Ship	Guns	Commander	Killed	Wounded	Total	Notes
Van
Suffolk	74	Rear-Admiral Joshua Rowley; Captain Hugh Cloberry Christian	7	25	32	
Boyne	70	Captain Herbert Sawyer	12	30	42	
Royal Oak	74	Captain Thomas Fitzherbert	4	12	16	
Prince of Wales	74	Vice-Admiral Samuel Barrington; Captain Benjamin Hill	26	46	72	
Magnificent	74	Captain John Elphinstone	8	11	19	
Trident	64	Captain Anthony James Pye Molloy	3	6	9	
Medway	60	Captain William Affleck	0	4	4	
Centre
Fame	74	Captain John Butchart	4	9	13	
Nonsuch	64	Captain Walter Griffith	0	0	0	
Sultan	74	Captain Alan Gardner	16	39	55	
Princess Royal	90	Vice-Admiral John Byron; Captain William Blair	3	6	9	Fleet flagship
Albion	74	Captain George Bowyer	0	2	2	
Stirling Castle	64	Captain Robert Carkett	2	6	8	
Elizabeth	74	Captain William Truscott	1	2	3	
Rear
Yarmouth	64	Captain Nathaniel Bateman	0	0	0	
Lion	64	Captain William Cornwallis	21	30	51	
Vigilant	64	Captain Sir Digby Dent	0	0	0	
Conqueror	74	Rear-Admiral Hyde Parker; Captain Harry Harmood	0	0	0	
Cornwall	74	Captain Timothy Edwards	16	27	43	
Monmouth	64	Captain Robert Fanshawe	25	28	53	
Grafton	74	Captain Thomas Collingwood	35	63	98	
Reconnaissance and signals
Ariadne	20	Captain Thomas Pringle	0	0	0	
Casualties: 183 killed, 346 wounded, 529 total
