= Victor-Louis Desmichels de Champorcin =

French Navy officer

Victor-Louis Desmichels de Champorcin (4 October 1724 – 6 July 1779 in Battle of Grenada) was a French Navy officer. He served in the War of American Independence.

== Biography ==
Champorcin was born to the family of Thérèse de Brouchier and of Henri Desmichels de Champorcin, governor of Digne. He joined the Navy as a Garde-Marine in January 1742. He served on the 26-gun frigate Flore, part of a division under Caylus, and took part in the action of 6 August 1741.

Champorcin was promoted to Ensign in 1748, and served on the 24-gun frigate Galatée, under Tourville, and Mutine, under Des Roches. He rose to Lieutenant in 1756.

In 1758, he was appointed to the 80-gun Foudroyant, on which he took part in the Battle of Cartagena on 28 February 1758. He was taken prisoner when Foudroyant was captured by Monmouth, Hampton Court and Swiftsure. Champorcin rose to Commander in 1767, and to Captain on 1772.

In May 1777, Champorcin captained the 64-gun Provence, based at Toulon. The next year, he was promoted to Brigadier, and Provence was appointed to the squadron under Estaing, bound for America. At the Battle of Rhode Island, Provence and Protecteur, under Dapchon, remained at sea to blockade Newport and prevent British relief to reach the city. He was killed at the Battle of Grenada on 6 July 1779.

First officer Garnier de Saint-Antonin took over command of Provence. Lacour-Gayet cited Champorcin as an example of the younger generation of officers who revitalised the French Navy after the nadir under Louis XV.

== Sources and references ==
Notes

Bibliography

- Contenson, Ludovic (1934). La Société des Cincinnati de France et la guerre d'Amérique (1778-1783). Paris: éditions Auguste Picard. OCLC 7842336.
- Lacour-Gayet, Georges (1905). La marine militaire de la France sous le règne de Louis XVI. Paris: Honoré Champion. OCLC 763372623.
- Roche, Jean-Michel (2005). Dictionnaire des bâtiments de la flotte de guerre française de Colbert à nos jours. Vol. 1. Group Retozel-Maury Millau. pp. 372–373. ISBN 978-2-9525917-0-6. OCLC 165892922.
- Troude, Onésime-Joachim (1867). Batailles navales de la France (in French). Vol. 2. Challamel ainé. OCLC 836362484.

External links

- Archives nationales (2011). "Fonds Marine, sous-série B/4: Campagnes, 1571-1785" (PDF).
- Rouxel, Jean-Christophe. "Victor Louis DESMICHELS de CHAMPORCIN". Parcours de vie dans la Royale.
