= Pierre-René-Bénigne-Mériadec de Bonneval =

- Born: 1741; Aix-en-Provence, France
- Died: 1814 (aged 72–73); Marseille, France
- Relatives: Pierre Joseph Hippolyte Ruffo de Bonneval
- Military career
- Branch: French Navy
- Rank: Brigadier des armées navales
- Conflicts: Battle of Minorca; Battle of Cartagena; Battle of Rhode Island; Battle of St. Lucia; Battle of Grenada

Pierre-René-Bénigne-Mériadec de Roux de Bonneval (Note: Name changed from "Roux de Bonneval" to "Ruffo de Bonneval" in 1814.) (Aix-en-Provence, 1741 — Marseille, 1814) was a French Navy officer. He served in the War of American Independence, and became a member of the Society of the Cincinnati.

== Biography ==
Bonneval was born to Marie Elisabeth du Trousset d'Héricourt and to Pierre Joseph Hilarion Ruffo de Bonneval, a military officer. His brother Charles Marie Joseph Isidore Bénigne Ruffo de la Fare also served in the Navy.

Bonneval joined the Navy as a Garde du Pavillon in 1756, He was promoted to Ensign in 1757.

He took part in the Battle of Minorca on 20 May 1756. The year after, he served on the 80-gun Foudroyant, and he was wounded and taken prisoner at the Battle of Cartagena on 28 February 1758.

He was promoted to Lieutenant in 1770, and made a Knight in the Order of Saint Louis in 1775. On 27 September 1774, he married Elisabeth de Saint Jacques. They have a son, Pierre Joseph Hippolyte Ruffo de Bonneval, who also served in the Navy.

In 1778, he commanded the 26-gun frigate Alcmène in the squadron under Estaing to take part in the War of American Independence. He took part in the Battle of Rhode Island on 29 August 1778, in the Battle of St. Lucia on 15 December 1778, and in the Battle of Grenada on 6 July 1779.

In 1780, he disembarked at Toulon due to illness. He was given command of Précieuse in 1782. From 1784, he served as Major de la Marine in Toulon. On 1 December 1789, he took a sabre blow to the head during the riots of Toulon.

== Works ==
- Bonneval, Pierre-René-Bénigne-Mériadec (1789). Déclaration du comte de Bonneval, major général de la Marine, sur les événemens qui lui sont relatifs passés à Toulon du Ier. au 15 décembre 1789 (in French). Marseille: Pierre-Antoine Favet.
- Carte corrigée du Golphe de Smirne (1784)
- Carte générale du passage des Dardanelles (1784)
- Plan de générale du canal de la Mer Noire (1784)
- Plan du Port de Navarin (1784)
- Plan du Mouillage de Coron (1784)
- Plan de générale du canal de la Mer Noire (1784)

== Sources and references ==
Notes

Bibliography

- Contenson, Ludovic (1934). La Société des Cincinnati de France et la guerre d'Amérique (1778-1783). Paris: éditions Auguste Picard. OCLC 7842336.
- Lacour-Gayet, Georges (1905). La marine militaire de la France sous le règne de Louis XVI. Paris: Honoré Champion. OCLC 763372623.
- Troude, Onésime-Joachim (1867). Batailles navales de la France (in French). Vol. 2. Challamel ainé. OCLC 836362484.
