= Charles-René de Gras-Préville =

French Navy officer of the War of American Independence

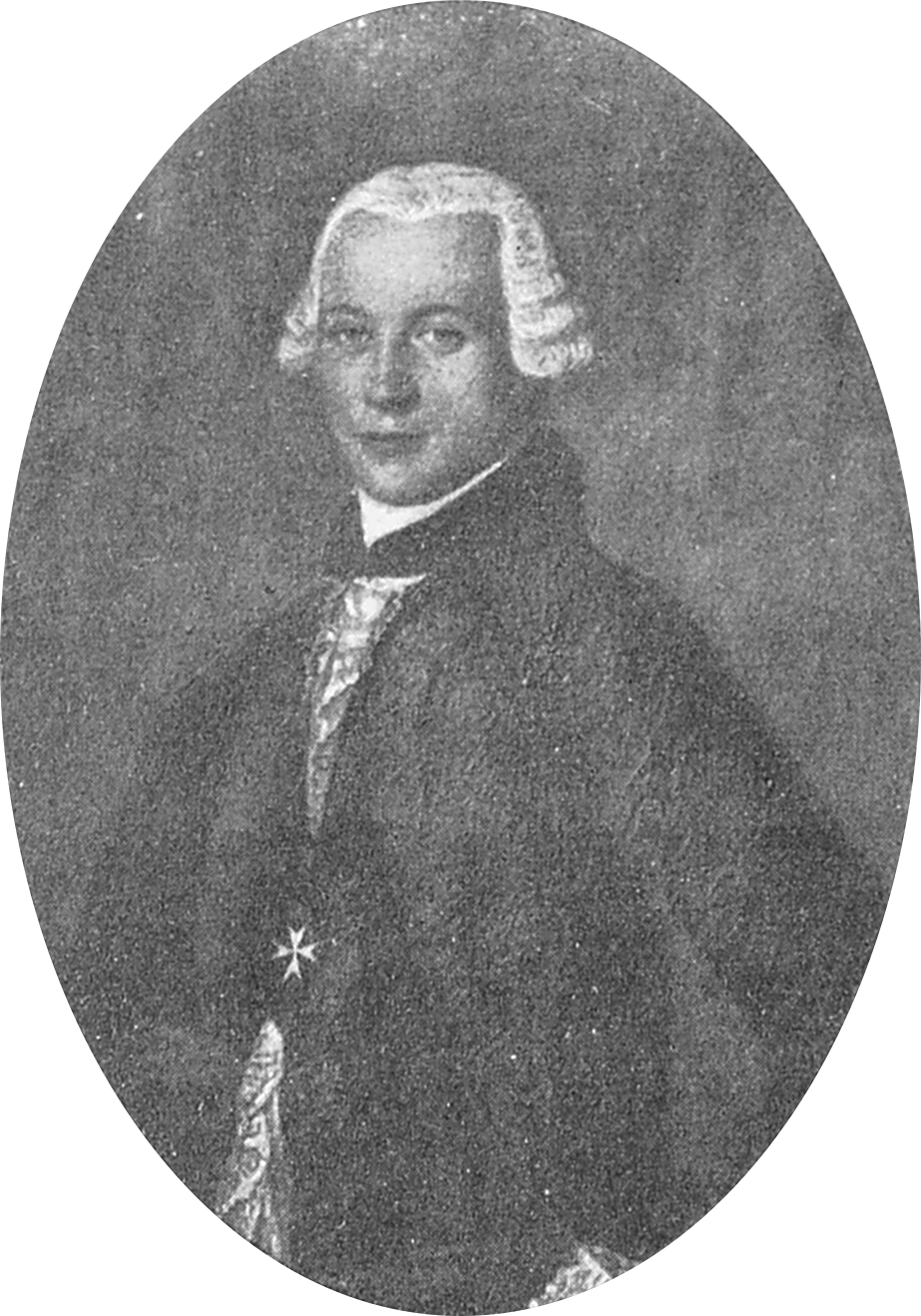
- Born: 1732; Tarascon, France
- Died: 11 December 1793 (aged 60–61) Lyon, France
- Branch: French Navy
- Rank: brigadier des armées navales
- Conflicts: Battle of Martinique; Invasion of Tobago; Battle of the Chesapeake

Charles-René de Gras-Préville (Tarascon, 1732 — Lyon, 11 December 1793) was a French Navy officer. He served in the War of American Independence, earning membership in the Society of the Cincinnati.

== Biography ==
Gras-Préville was born to an aristocratic family from Tarascon. He was uncle to René Louis Dominique de Gras-Préville.

Gras-Préville joined the Navy as a Garde de l'Étendard in 1746. He was promoted to Ensign in 1754, and to Lieutenant on 15 January 1762.

Gras-Préville was promoted to Captain on 4 April 1777, in spite of a relative inexperience of command. In July 1778, he commanded the frigate Engageante, and on 6 July 1778 he captured the British 26-gun privateer frigate Rose, which surrendered only when she was so damaged that she had to be scuttled. D'Estaing tasked him to recruit volunteers in the Caribbean. In February, Engageante departed Toulon for America, where she arrived in late March, but had to be quaranteened. In April 1779, he escorted a convoy from Martinique to France, and earned himself a 800-livre pension when he defended it against the British.

On 12 June 1779, Gras-Préville was promoted to the command of the 80-gun ship Triomphant. He captained her at the Battle of Martinique on 17 April 1780 as flag captain of the White-and-Blue squadron (van) under Sade, in the fleet under Guichen. He also took part in the actions of 15 May and 19 May 1780, before sailing Triomphant back to France.

In 1781, he commanded the 74-gun Zélé in the White squadron (centre) of the fleet under De Grasse. He took part in the Invasion of Tobago in May 1781 and in the Battle of the Chesapeake on 5 September 1781.

In the night of 11 to 12 April 1782, Zélé collided with Ville de Paris, damaging Zélé which had to be taken in tow to repair at Martinique.

Gras-Préville retired from the Navy on 1 October 1786. During the French Revolution, he joined the Royalist army and took part in the Siege of Lyon on 8 August 1793. He was captured by the Republicans and shot on 11 December 1793.

== Sources and references ==
Notes

Citations

References

- Contenson, Ludovic (1934). La Société des Cincinnati de France et la guerre d'Amérique (1778-1783). Paris: éditions Auguste Picard. OCLC 7842336.
- Lacour-Gayet, Georges (1910). La marine militaire de la France sous le règne de Louis XVI. Paris: Honoré Champion. pp. 431–434.
- Troude, Onésime-Joachim (1867). Batailles navales de la France (in French). Vol. 2. Challamel ainé.
- Naval History Division (2019). Naval Documents of the American Revolution: American Theater: June 1, 1778–August 15, 1778; European Theater: June 1, 1778–August 15, 1778 (PDF). Vol. 13. United States.

External links

- Archives nationales (2011). "Fonds Marine, sous-série B/4: Campagnes, 1571-1785" (PDF).
