= Étienne-Joseph de Saint-Germain d'Apchon =

French navy officer

Governor of Fort Lupin
- In office 1780–1783

Personal details
- Born: 1724
- Died: Unknown

Military service
- Branch/service: French Navy
- Battles/wars: War of American Independence

Étienne-Joseph de Saint-Germain d'Apchon (Note: Sometimes written "Dapchon".) (1724 — ) was a French Navy officer. He served in the War of American Independence, and became a member of the Society of the Cincinnati.

== Biography ==
Apchon was born to a family from Forez.

He joined the Navy as a Garde-Marine in 1740, and was promoted to Lieutenant in 1756.

He captained the 24-gun frigate Gracieuse in the squadron under Du Chaffault for the Larache expedition in 1765. the year after, he transferred on the 32-gun frigate Pléïade.

In 1770, Apchon was promoted to captain. The year after, he was in command of the 40-gun frigate Atalante, which he sailed to Toulon, Tunis and Malta. In 1773, he captained the 80-gun Languedoc.

In 1778, he was captain of the 74-gun Protecteur, part of the squadron under Vice-amiral d'Estaing. He took part in the Battle of St. Lucia on 15 December 1778.

In 1780, he took part in the joint French-Spanish fleet under Córdova. Later that year, he was appointed governor of Fort Lupin, a position he held until 1783. In 1783, Apchon was part in the inquiry into the events of the Battle of the Saintes.

== Sources and references ==
Notes

Bibliography

- Berbouche, Alain (2010). Marine et justice : la justice criminelle de la Marine française sous l'Ancien Régime. Collection Histoire (in French). Rennes: Presses Universitaires de Rennes. ISBN 9782753510944. OCLC 643008989.
- Contenson, Ludovic (1934). La Société des Cincinnati de France et la guerre d'Amérique (1778-1783). Paris: éditions Auguste Picard. OCLC 7842336.
- Lacour-Gayet, Georges (1905). La marine militaire de la France sous le règne de Louis XVI. Paris: Honoré Champion. OCLC 763372623.
- Troude, Onésime-Joachim (1867). Batailles navales de la France (in French). Vol. 2. Challamel ainé. OCLC 836362484.
