= Hippolyte de Sade de Vaudronne =

French Navy officer

- Born: 3 October 1710; Tarascon, France
- Died: 18 September 1780 (aged 69); Triomphant, off Cadiz
- Relatives: Marquis de Sade; Louis de Sade
- Military career
- Branch: French Navy
- Rank: Chef d'Escadre
- Conflicts: action of 8 January 1780; Battle of Cape St. Vincent; Battle of Martinique

Hippolyte-Augustin de Sade de Vaudronne (3 October 1710, in Tarascon – 18 September 1780, in Triomphant, off Cadiz) was a French Navy officer. He served during the War of American Independence.

== Biography ==
Sade was born to a noble family in Tarascon. He was a distant cousin of the Marquis de Sade, and uncle to Louis de Sade.

Sade joined the Navy as a Garde-Marine in April 1730. He was promoted to Ensign in April 1738.

In 1757, Sade was sent for a mission to Algiers, commanding the 30-gun frigate Rose. The year after, he sailed Rose to Malta and Toulon. On 4 March, he captured the British privateer Tiger. On 30 July, Rose encountered the 32-gun HMS Thames, and in the ensuing battle, Sade beached Rose and scuttled her by fire to prevent her falling into British hands. Sade and his crew were rescued by Triton.

In 1760, Sade captained the 54-gun Hippopotame, on which he conducted a cruise in the Eastern Mediterranean from 21 June 1760 to 22 January 1761, in the squadron under Rochemore. He next conducted another expedition in the Mediterranean from 25 May 1762 to 10 December, in the squadron under Bompar.

In 1770, Sade was given command of the frigate Engageante. He sailed to Malta, and reported on the Battle of Chesma.

In 1773, Sade captained the 74-gun Bourgogne, with La Poype-Vertrieux as his first officer.

In early 1780, Sade was given command of a 6-ship and 5-frigate division, to reinforce the Spanish fleet blockading Gibraltar. On 2 January, a gale damaged several ships of the fleet and forced them into harbour to effect repairs, allowing Rodney to prey on Spanish shipping in the action of 8 January 1780, and on a small Spanish fleet in the Battle of Cape St. Vincent on 16 January.

In 1780, Sade was Chef d'Escadre and commanded the 8-ship White-and-Blue squadron (van) the Guichen's fleet, with his flag on the 80-gun Triomphant and Gras-Préville as his flag captain. He fought in this capacity at the Battle of Martinique on 17 April 1780.

Sade died aboard Triomphant, off Cadiz, 18 September 1780.
