= Henri-Louis de Boulainvilliers de Croy =

- Service / branch: French Navy
- Rank: Chef d'escadre
- Battles / wars: Battle of Rhode Island; Battle of Grenada; Siege of Savannah

Henri-Louis de Boulainvilliers de Croy (Note: Also written "Croÿ".) was a French Navy officer. He served in the War of American Independence. He was a member of the Society of the Cincinnati.

== Biography ==
Boulainvilliers was born to a noble family from Brest. His father was a Navy captain. His son, Joseph de Boulainvilliers de Croy, was also a Navy officer and later a Chouan insurgent.

Boulainvilliers joined the Navy as a Garde-Marine in 1735. He was promoted to Lieutenant in 1751, and to Captain in 1757.

He commanded the 80-gun Languedoc as flag captain to Estaing. He took part in the Battle of Rhode Island, the Battle of Grenada on 6 July 1779, and in the Siege of Savannah.

Boulainvilliers' superiors saw him as having reach the limits of his abilities, and advised against his promotion to a general officer position. (Note: On in 1776 list of captains, Boulainvilliers is noted as "merely a good subordinate. Has long and well served as such, but would not be fit to command a squadron". Estaing noted "If he did little, because he would not be able of more, he behaved as a good man and did his best".) Boulainvilliers was promoted to Chef d'escadre on 5 May 1780, and was retired from the Navy on 13, a week later.

== Sources and references ==
Notes

Bibliography

- Contenson, Ludovic (1934). La Société des Cincinnati de France et la guerre d'Amérique (1778-1783). Paris: éditions Auguste Picard. OCLC 7842336.
- Gélis, Matthieu (2010). "Joseph de Boulainvilliers, premier général des chouans du Morbihan" (PDF). Mémoires de la société d'histoire et d'archéologie de Bretagne (LXXXVIII). Rennes: Société d'histoire et d'archéologie de Bretagne: 153–170. OCLC 869411366. Archived from the original (PDF) on 18 July 2020.
- Lacour-Gayet, Georges (1905). La marine militaire de la France sous le règne de Louis XVI. Paris: Honoré Champion. OCLC 763372623.
- Troude, Onésime-Joachim (1867). Batailles navales de la France (in French). Vol. 2. Challamel ainé. OCLC 836362484.
