= French ship Hippopotame =

Ship of the line of the French Navy

History

France
- Name: Hippopotame
- Namesake: Hippopotamus
- Ordered: 18 December 1747
- Builder: Toulon
- Laid down: February 1748
- Launched: 5 July 1749
- Decommissioned: April 1777
- In service: 1750

France
- Name: Fier Rodrigue

France
- Name: Fier Rodrigue
- Fate: Broken up 1784

France
- Name: Fier Rodrigue

General characteristics
- Displacement: 1611 tonneaux
- Tons burthen: 900 port tonneaux
- Length: 46.0 metres
- Beam: 12.5 metres
- Draught: 6.3 metres
- Propulsion: Sail
- Complement: 450 men
- Armament: 24 × 18-pounder long guns; 26 × 12-pounder long guns

Hippopotame was a 50-gun ship of the line of the French Navy, designed by François Coulomb the Younger. She served during the Seven Years' War. In 1777, Pierre Beaumarchais purchased her as part of a commercial entreprise to provide weapons of the American independentist insurgents. She was part of the French line of battle at the Battle of Grenada on 6 July 1779, and served as a hospital during the Siege of Savannah.

== Career ==
=== Seven Years' War ===
Hippopotame entered service in 1750. From 1760, she was under Hippolyte de Sade de Vaudronne. In 1763, she conducted a mission to Algiers, under Captain de Fabry.

=== Interwar period ===
In 1769, Hippopotame was at Saint Domingue and Martinique under Vaudreuil, along with Solitaire, ferrying troops to the French colonies in the Caribbeans.

She was part of the 1772 Escadre d'évolution under Captain Bougainvilliers de Croy.

=== War of American Independence ===
In April 1777, the Navy sold her to Roderigue Hortalez and Company, a company founded by Pierre Beaumarchais. He renamed her Fier Rodrigue and from 1778, he used her to ferry weapons to the American insurgents. She departed Rochefort in January 1778, sailed to Saint-Domingue and America, and was back in Rochefort on 1 October.

In early 1779, she departed Rochefort to sail to Brest and Ile d'Aix. She departed Ile d'Aix around April, and sail to America.

In July 1779, Fier Rodrigue was escorting a 10-ship convoy near Grenada. On 6, she encountered the fleet under d'Estaing, preparing for battle. the French Navy requisitioned her and she took part in the ensuing Battle of Grenada. Her captain, Montault, was killed, and 22-year old auxiliary officer Ganteaume

The requisition of Fier Rodrigue caused several ships of Beaumarchais' convoy to be captured. Beaumarchais protested and sought compensation from the French Crown.

Around August 1779, Fier Rodrigue was used as a hospital ship in Charlestown, to support the Siege of Savannah. Two month later, the Navy returned her to Beaumarchais.

Fier Rodrigue called the Chesapeake and Yorktown, from where she departed on 14 August 1780, bound for Rochefort. On 1 August 1780, Fier Rodrigue arrived at Île de Ré, escorting a 15-ship convoy from New England, as well as two prizes captured from the British.

== Fate ==
Fier Rodrigue was condemned in March 1782, and was broken up in Rochefort in 1784.
