= HMS Fame (1759) =

18th-century Royal Navy ship

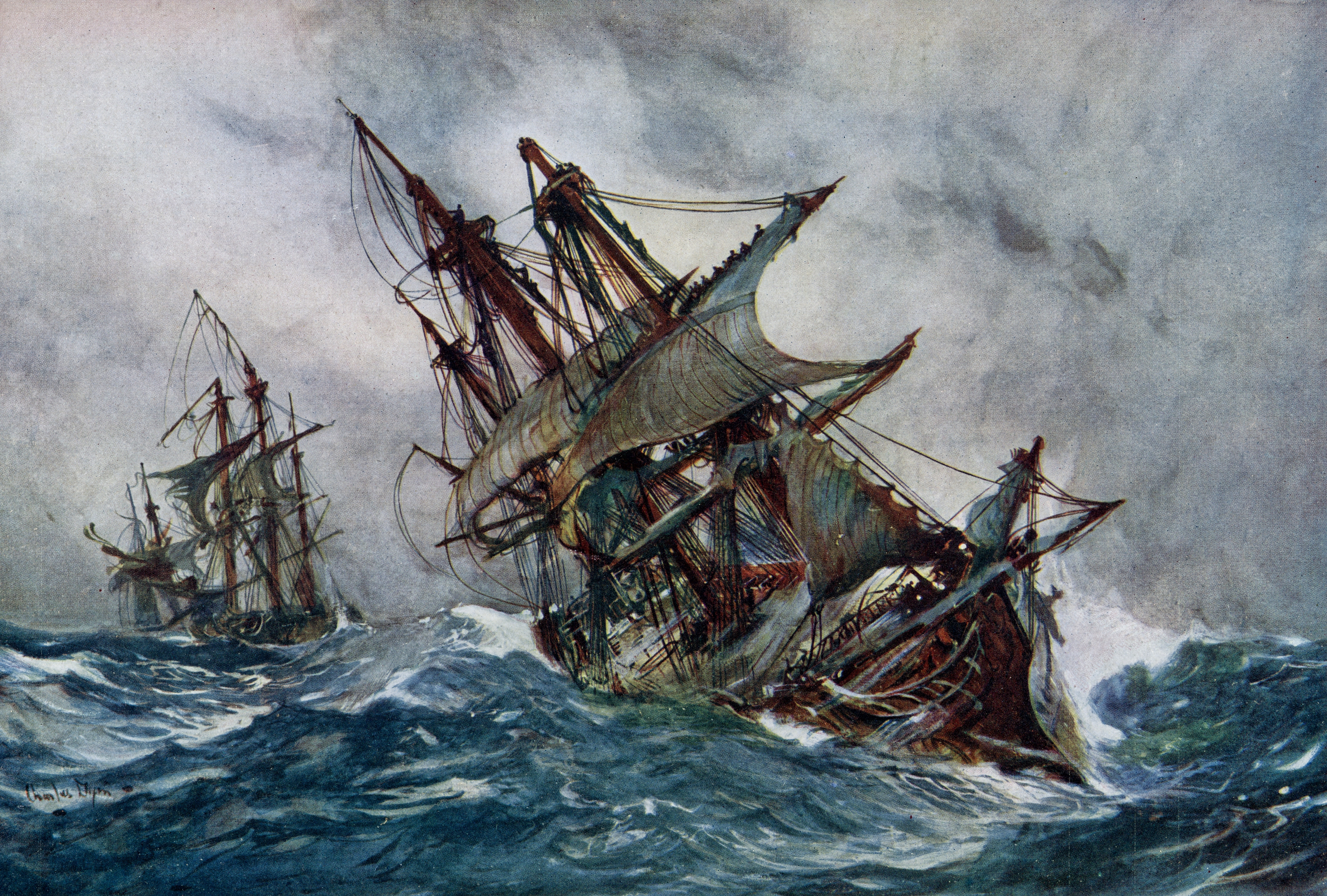
- Fame in foul weather, by Charles Dixon

History

Great Britain
- Name: HMS Fame
- Ordered: 13 April 1756
- Builder: Bird, Deptford
- Laid down: 28 May 1756
- Launched: 1 January 1759
- Renamed: HMS Guildford, December 1799
- Honours and awards: Participated in: Battle of Grenada; Battle of the Saintes
- Fate: Sold out of the service, 1814

General characteristics
- Class & type: 74-gun third rate ship of the line
- Tons burthen: 1565 89/94 (bm)
- Length: 165 ft 6 in (50.44 m) (gundeck)
- Beam: 46 ft 7 in (14.20 m)
- Depth of hold: 19 ft 10 in (6.05 m)
- Propulsion: Sails
- Sail plan: Full-rigged ship
- Armament: 74 guns: Gundeck: 28 × 32 pdrs; Upper gundeck: 28 × 18 pdrs; Quarterdeck: 14 × 9 pdrs; Forecastle: 4 × 9 pdrs

HMS Fame was a 74-gun third-rate ship of the line of the Royal Navy, in service during the Seven Years' War and the American Revolutionary War.

== Construction ==
Orders for Fame's construction were issued by Admiralty in April 1756, in the months before the outbreak of the Seven Years' War against France. She was designed by naval architect William Bately, newly appointed as co-Surveyor of the Navy alongside his more senior colleague Sir Thomas Slade. It was Bately's first design for a vessel of this size, and borrowed heavily from Slade's specifications for the older 74-gun Dublin-class ships which were then under construction at England's Royal Dockyards. Bately's drawings also drew inspiration from the dimensions and sailing qualities of the King's yacht Royal Caroline. It was the only vessel built to these specifications; all subsequent 74-gun vessels launched during the Seven Years' War were designed directly by Slade.

There was little room available in the Royal Dockyards for the new vessel. Consequently, despite some Navy Board misgivings regarding quality and cost, contracts for her construction were issued to a private shipwright, Henry Bird of Rotherhithe, for £17.2s per ton burthen and with an emphasis on completion and launch by May 1758. Fame's keel was laid down 28 May 1756 but work proceeded slowly, with the vessel not finally ready for launch until 1 January 1759. As built Fame was comparable in size to Slade's Dublin–class vessels, being 165 ft 6 in (50.4 m) long with a 134 ft 0 in (40.8 m) keel, a beam of 46 ft 6 in (14.17 m), and a hold depth of 19 ft 10.5 in (6.1 m). Construction expenses were £26,392.10s with an additional £9,169.9s for fitting-out – significantly less than costs for the majority of Dublin–class ships.

Her designated complement was 550, comprising five commissioned officers – a captain and four lieutenants – overseeing 80 warrant and petty officers, 304 naval ratings, 99 Marines and 62 servants and other ranks. (Note: The 62 servants and other ranks on board were 39 personal servants and clerical staff, 10 assistant sailmakers and carpenters, a steward's assistant and 12 widow's men – fictitious crew members whose pay was intended to be reallocated to the families of sailors who died at sea.)

== Naval career ==
In 1762, while in company with Lion, she captured the French 10-gun ship Ecureuil. On 20 January 1768, she was driven from her moorings at Plymouth, Devon onto St. Nicholas Island and was severely damaged. She collided with the Irish ships Freemason and Valentine. The former was also driven ashore on St. Nicholas Island, the latter sank in the Hamoaze. HMS Fame was refloated on 5 February and taken in to Plymouth for repairs.

In 1778, commanded by Captain Stephen Colby, she proceeded to the North American station in a fleet of 14 ships commanded by Vice-Admiral the Hon. John Byron with his flag in Princess Royal.

On 6 July 1779, commanded by Captain John Butchart, Fame took part in the Battle of Grenada against the French. The French fleet, under Admiral D’Estaing, consisted of 25 ships of the line and several frigates. The British fleet, under Vice-Admiral Byron, had 21 ships of the line and 1 frigate. The French were anchored off Georgetown on the south-west of the island, and the English approached during the night. D’Estaing weighed at 4 am and Byron chased. The British ships attacked in utter disorder and confusion. Fame and three other ships got separated from the main body, and were very badly mauled. The French lost no ships and eventually hauled off. The British lost 183 killed and 346 wounded. Fame lost 4 killed and 9 wounded. The French lost 190 killed and 759 wounded. This action reflected no credit on either side.

In 1782, commanded by Captain Robert Barbor, she was one of a fleet of 36 ships of the line under Admiral Sir George Rodney, who flew his flag in Formidable. They met in the West Indies between Dominica and Guadeloupe a French fleet of 33 ships of the line commanded by Vice-Admiral Comte de Grasse with his flag in Ville de Paris. The fighting was spread over several days, and the French were defeated in the Battle of the Saintes.

George Vancouver served as lieutenant on this Fame under Captain Robert Barbor during this engagement. Vancouver later went on captain his own ship, HMS Discovery, on a voyage of discovery to the Pacific Northwest in search of the Northwest passage.

In December 1799, Fame was renamed Guilford and fitted as a prison ship. She was eventually sold out of the service in 1814.
