= HMS Renown (1774) =

50-gun fourth-rate ship of the Royal Navy

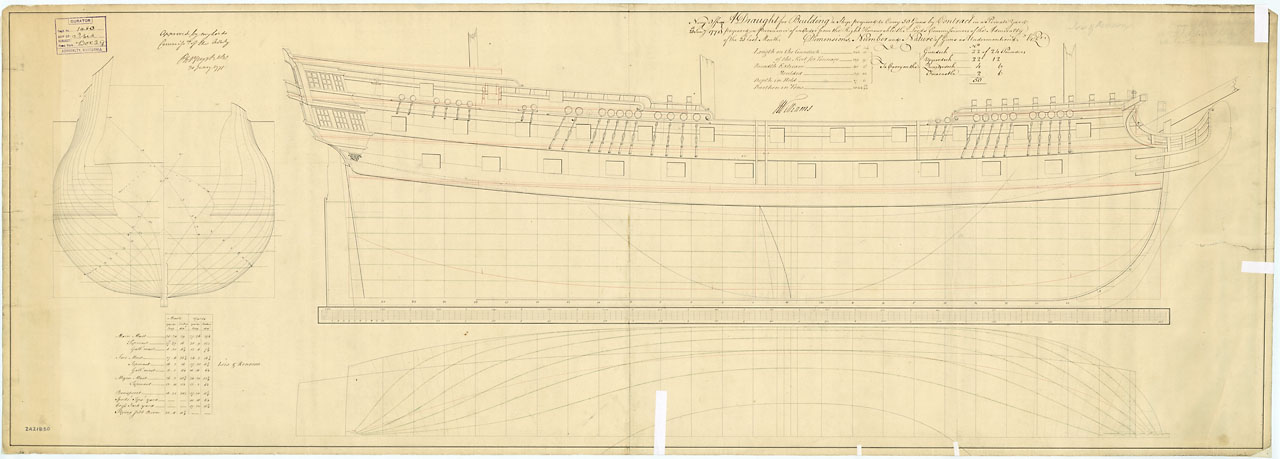
- Ship plan of Renown

History

Great Britain
- Name: HMS Renown
- Ordered: 25 December 1770
- Builder: Robert Fabian, Chapel, Southampton
- Laid down: May 1771
- Launched: 4 December 1774
- Completed: 16 September 1775 at Portsmouth Dockyard
- Commissioned: July 1775
- Fate: Taken to pieces at Sheerness in December 1794

General characteristics
- Class & type: Portland-class fourth-rate warship
- Tons burthen: 1,050 48/94 bm
- Length: 146 ft 0 in (44.5 m) (gundeck); 119 ft 8 in (36.5 m) (keel)
- Beam: 40 ft 7.5 in (12.4 m)
- Depth of hold: 17 ft 4.5 in (5.30 m)
- Sail plan: Full-rigged ship
- Complement: 340
- Armament: 50 guns comprising: Lower deck: 22 × 24-pounder guns; Upper deck: 22 × 12-pounder guns; Quarterdeck: 4 × 6-pounder guns; Forecastle: 2 × 6-pounder guns

HMS Renown was a small two-decker 50-gun fourth-rate ship of the Royal Navy. She belonged to the Portland class, designed in 1766 by John Williams, the Surveyor of the Navy, and was built under contract by Robert Fabian at Southampton.

Renown was first commissioned in July 1775 under Captain Francis Banks. After completion at Portsmouth Dockyard, she sailed on 30 September for North America. Banks died on 18 June 1777, and command passed to Lieutenant George Dawson, posted captain in September 1777.

She took part in Admiral Richard Howe's notable action against the French fleet under the Comte d'Estaing on 11 August 1778. Two days subsequent to this, she attacked the 90-gun Languedoc, which had been dismasted the day before in a storm, and raked her.

She returned to England in November 1780 and underwent a refit and replacement of her coppering until February 1781, before recommissioning under Captain John Henry and returning to the North American station. The Renown took part in Kempenfelt's Action on 12 December 1781. She finally returned home and paid off out of commission in August 1784. She was fitted as a lazarette at Chatham Dockyard in March 1794, but was eventually broken up at Sheerness in December 1794.
