= French ship Scipion (1790) =

Ship of the line of the French Navy

- Scale model of Achille, sister ship of French ship Scipion (1790), on display at the Musée national de la Marine in Paris.

History

France
- Name: Scipion
- Namesake: Scipio Africanus
- Ordered: 19 October 1787
- Builder: Toulon
- Laid down: 1789
- Launched: 30 July 1790
- Decommissioned: 1793
- Fate: Burnt 28 November 1793

General characteristics
- Class & type: Téméraire-class ship of the line
- Displacement: 3,069 tonneaux
- Tons burthen: 1,537 port tonneaux
- Length: 55.87 m (183 ft 4 in)
- Beam: 14.46 m (47 ft 5 in)
- Draught: 7.15 m (23.5 ft)
- Depth of hold: 7.15 m (23 ft 5 in)
- Sail plan: Full-rigged ship
- Crew: 705
- Armament: 74 guns: Lower gun deck: 28 × 36 pdr guns; Upper gun deck: 30 × 18 pdr guns; Forecastle and Quarterdeck: 16 × 8 pdr guns

Scipion was a 74-gun Téméraire-class ship of the line built for the French Navy during the 1780s. Completed in 1790, she played a minor role in the French Revolutionary Wars.

== Description ==
The Téméraire-class ships had a length of 55.87 metres (183 ft 4 in), a beam of 14.46 metres (47 ft 5 in) and a depth of hold of 7.15 metres (23 ft 5 in). The ships displaced 3,069 tonneaux and had a mean draught of 7.15 metres (23 ft 5 in). They had a tonnage of 1,537 port tonneaux. Their crew numbered 705 officers and ratings during wartime. They were fitted with three masts and ship rigged.

The muzzle-loading, smoothbore armament of the Téméraire class consisted of twenty-eight 36-pounder long guns on the lower gun deck, thirty 18-pounder long guns and thirty 18-pounder long guns on the upper gun deck. On the quarterdeck and forecastle were a total of sixteen 8-pounder long guns. Beginning with the ships completed after 1787, the armament of the Téméraires began to change with the addition of four 36-pounder obusiers on the poop deck (dunette). Some ships had instead twenty 8-pounders.

== Construction and career ==
Scipion was ordered on 19 October 1787 and laid down at the Arsenal de Toulon in 1789. The ship was launched on 30 July 1790 and completed in November. In 1792, Scipion took part in operations against Nice, Villefranche and Oneille. In December, she joined the division under Admiral Latouche Tréville, and assisted the damaged Languedoc during the storm of 21 to 23 of that month. Captured by the British after Toulon was surrendered by Royalist sympathisers, she was commissioned with a crew of French rebels. On 28 November 1793, she caught fire by accident in the harbour of Livorno and exploded, killing 86 including her commanding officer, Captain Degoy.
