= Walter Griffith (Royal Navy officer) =

Welsh officer of the Royal Navy

Captain Walter Griffith
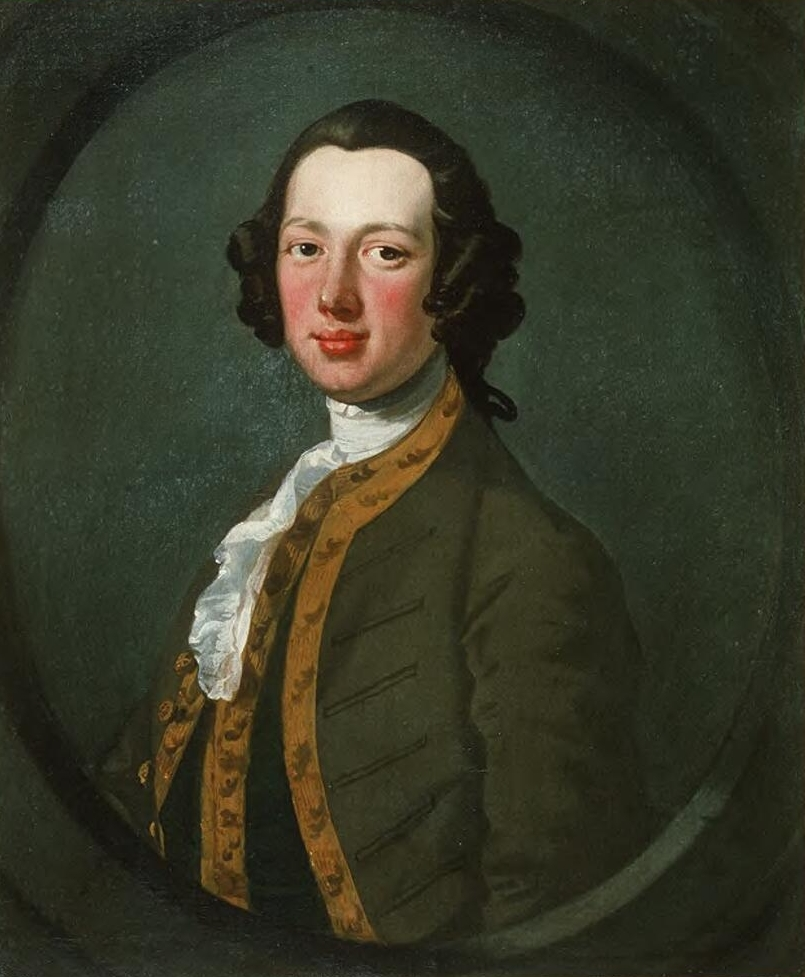
- Died: 18 December 1779
- Military career
- Allegiance: Kingdom of Great Britain
- Branch: Royal Navy
- Rank: Post-captain
- Commands: HMS Postilion; HMS Argo; HMS Gibraltar; HMS Namur; HMS Nonsuch; HMS Conqueror
- Conflicts: American War of Independence; Battle of St. Lucia; Battle of Grenada; Battle of Martinique

Walter Griffith (died 1779) was an officer of the Royal Navy during the American War of Independence.

Griffith was of an old family long settled in Merionethshire. He was promoted to be a lieutenant in the navy on 7 May 1755, and served at that rank on board the 60-gun Eagle from 1755 to 1757, the 100-gun HMS Royal George when she carried Lord Anson's flag in the summer of 1758, and under Sir Edward Hawke in 1759. On 4 June 1759 he was promoted to the command of the 18-gun sloop HMS Postilion. On 23 June, writing from Sheerness, he reported his having taken up the command; on 24 June he acknowledged an order to command the 28-gun HMS Argo during the illness of her captain; and on 16 July wrote that, Captain Tinker being recovered, he had returned to the Postilion. These dates seem to throw great doubt on the accuracy of Charnock's statement that, on 24 June 1759, Griffith married the widow of Lord George Bentinck, who died on 1 March 1759.

In September 1759 he was appointed to the temporary command of HMS Gibraltar, and, being attached to the grand fleet off Brest, was fortunate enough to fall in with the French fleet on 15 November. After watching it carefully, he despatched full intelligence to Hawke and to the Admiralty, while he himself went to warn Admiral Thomas Brodrick, then blockading Cádiz. His conduct on this occasion called forth an unusually warm encomium from the admiralty, as well as a direct intimation that 'he might very soon expect some mark of their favour' (Minute on Griffith's official letter of 17 November 1759). He was consequently confirmed to the command of the Gibraltar, his commission as captain bearing date 11 December 1759. He continued in her until 1766, being employed in the Mediterraneanin until the peace, and afterwards on the home station. During the Spanish armament in 1770 he commanded the 90-gun HMS Namur for a few weeks, and in 1776 was appointed to the 64-gun HMS Nonsuch, in which, early in the following year, he joined Lord Howe on the North American station, where he took part in the defence of Sandy Hook against D'Estaing in July and August 1778. He afterwards sailed with Commodore William Hotham for the West Indies, where he shared in the Battle of St. Lucia on 15 December, and in the Battle of Grenada in the following July. When John Byron resigned the command to Rear-Admiral Hyde Parker, Griffith was moved into the 74-gun HMS Conqueror; but a few months later, on 18 December 1779, was killed in a slight encounter with the French in Fort Royal Bay, the Battle of Martinique. 'The service,' wrote Parker, 'cannot lose a better man or a better officer.'
