= French ship Triomphant (1779) =

Ship of the line of the French Navy

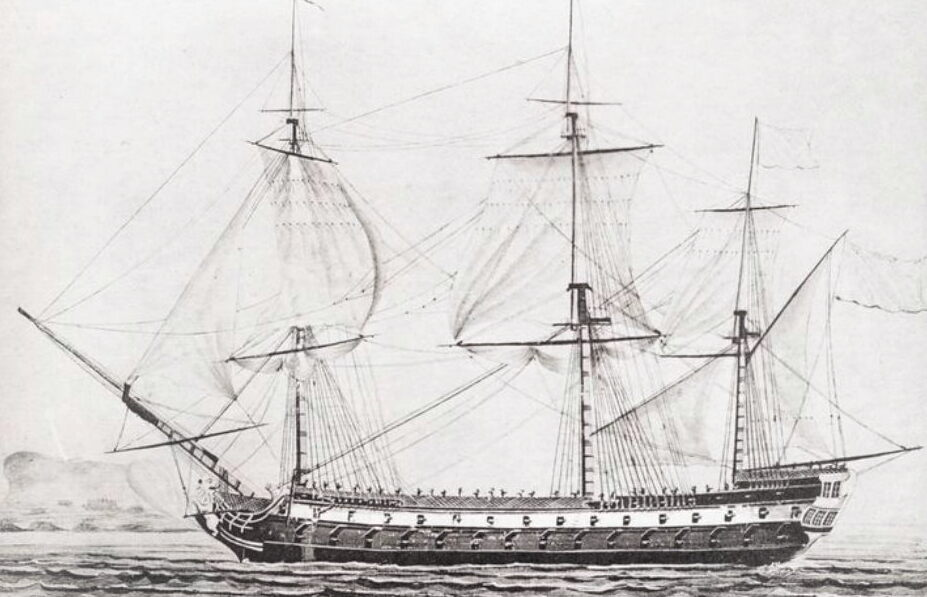
- Illustration of Triomphant

History

France
- Name: Triomphant
- Builder: Toulon
- Laid down: March 1778
- Launched: 31 March 1779
- Completed: June 1779
- Captured: August 1793
- Fate: Burnt on 18 December 1793; Broken up in 1805

General characteristics
- Armament: 80 guns

Triomphant was an 80-gun ship of the line of the French Navy.

== Career ==
Laid down in Toulon in March 1778 by the designer-builder Joseph-Marie-Blaise Coulomb, she was launched on 31 March 1779 and completed in June 1779. In 1779, Triomphant was the flagship of the White-and-Blue squadron (van) of the fleet of Guichen, under Chef d'escadre de Sade, with Gras-Préville as flag captain. As such, he took part in the Battle of Martinique on 17 April 1780, and in the actions of 15 May and 19 May 1780. She then sailed back to France.

In 1781, she was under Chérisey de Nouroy. On 12 April 1782, she took part in the Battle of the Saintes under Chef d'escadre Vaudreuil, with Cheyron du Pavillon as flag captain. She was captured at Toulon by the Anglo-Spanish forces in August 1793, and was burnt there on 18 December 1793 during the evacuation of the port. Her remains were refloated in 1805 and broken up.
