= French ship Languedoc (1766) =

Ship of the line of the French Navy

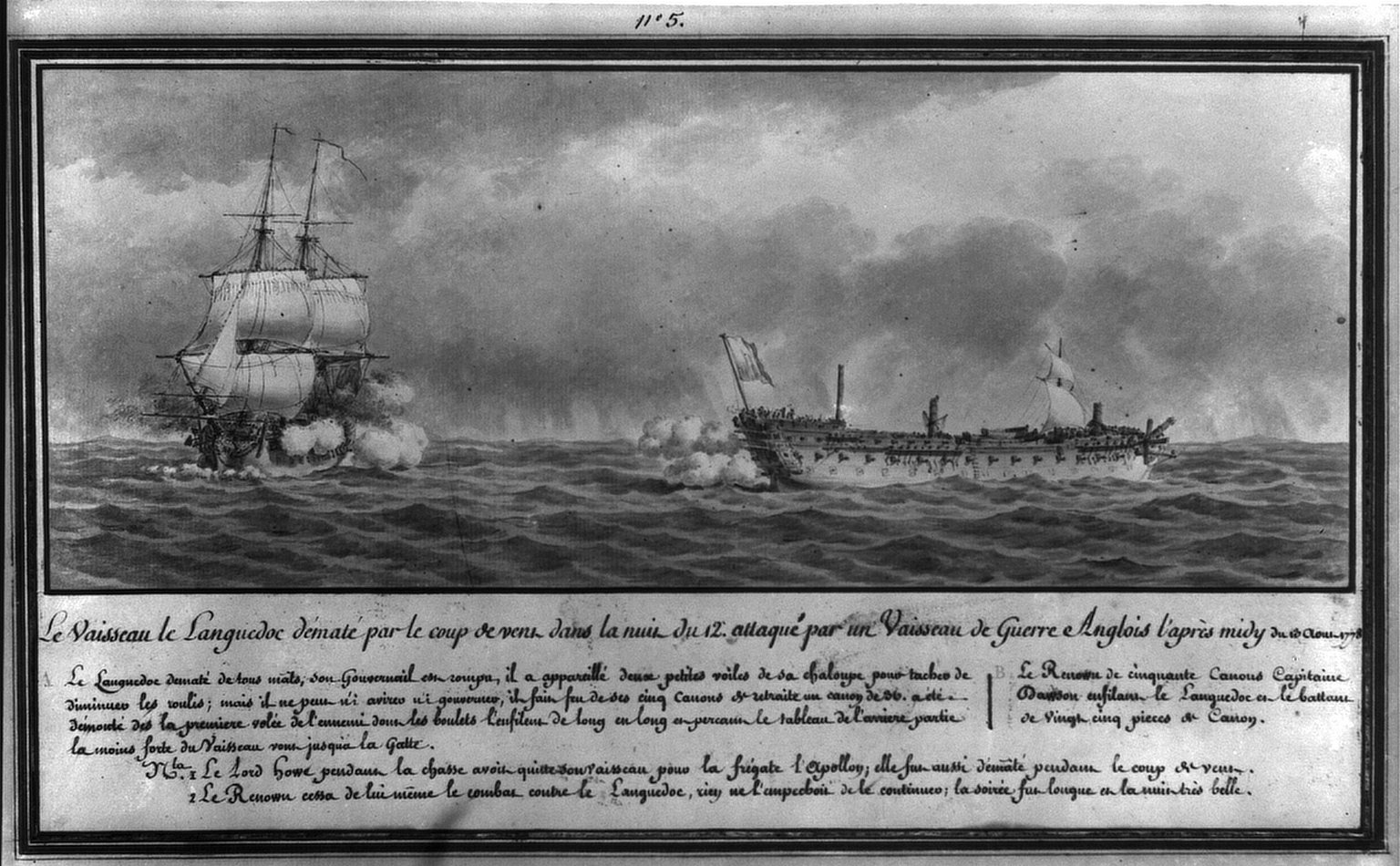
- The Languedoc, dismasted by the storm the night of the 12th, attacked by HMS Renown the afternoon of 13 August 1778

History

France
- Namesake: Languedoc
- Builder: Arsenal of Toulon
- Laid down: 1764
- Launched: 15 May 1766
- In service: 17 January 1778
- Renamed: Renamed Antifédéraliste; renamed Victoire (July 1794)
- Fate: Broken up 1799

General characteristics
- Class & type: Saint-Esprit-class ship of the line
- Displacement: 3850 tonneaux
- Tons burthen: 2100 port tonneaux
- Length: 59.8 m (196 ft 2 in)
- Beam: 14.9 m (48 ft 11 in)
- Draught: 7.5 m (24 ft 7 in)
- Complement: 670
- Armament: 80 guns; Lower deck: 30 × 36-pounders; Upper deck: 32 × 24-pounders; Castles: 18 × 8-pounders

Languedoc was an 80-gun ship of the line of the French Navy and flagship of Admiral d'Estaing. She was offered to King Louis XV by the Estates of Languedoc, as part of the don des vaisseaux, a national effort to rebuild the navy after the Seven Years' War. She was designed by the naval architect Joseph Coulomb.

== Construction ==
Ordered in Toulon, Languedoc took several years to complete due to a lack of timber in the shipyard, already busy building Zélé and Bourgogne, and with the orders for the 74-gun Marseillois and the 64-gun Provence in queue.

== Career ==
In 1773, she was under Apchon.

=== War of American Independence ===
In 1778, France decided to intervene in the American War of Independence, and the Anglo-French War broke out. Vice-amiral d'Estaing was ordered to take the fleet to the Americas. He set his flag on the Languedoc, after her upgrade to 90 guns. His 12-ship fleet set sail on the 18 April 1778. The fleet reached New York on 8 July 1778, and Languedoc landed the French chargé d'affaires.

On 10 of August, the French fleet encountered the English fleets of Admirals Howe and Byron. A tempest broke out, and Languedoc lost her rigging and steering. The 50-gun HMS Renown raked her, but she was saved by the timely arrival of a French squadron led by Suffren.

Languedoc was Estaing's flagship for his mission to the British colonies in North America, with Boulainvilliers as flag captain. She took part in the Battle of St. Lucia in December 1778. Languedoc then took part in the Capture of Grenada from 2 to 4 July 1779.

Languedoc returned to France, where she was refitted. In 1781, she set sail in the fleet of Admiral de Grasse. She took part in the Battle of the Chesapeake under Parscau du Plessix.

At the Battle of the Saintes, Languedoc was under Captain Arros d'Argelos, and followed the fleet flagship Ville de Paris in the French line of battle. The French fleet was parted in two, and Languedoc retreated, leaving De Grasse to be captured. Languedoc then joined with La Pérouse, and reached Brest on the 28 June 1783. The subsequent inquiry into the battle found Argelos innocent, De Grasse being found ultimately responsible.

=== French Revolutionary wars ===
Languedoc was refitted and upgraded by engineer Jacques-Noël Sané. On the 5 September 1792, she set sail under Admiral de Latouche Tréville. She took part in the campaign off Italy, and was badly damaged in the tempests of December; from 21 to 23, Scipion had to assist. On the 7 February, she took part in the landing of troops in Sardinia.

She sailed back to Toulon and undertook extensive repairs. Toulon fell to the hands of the English and was retaken by the French. The Languedoc, being deemed unusable, was not destroyed when the English left the city. She was renamed Antifédéraliste at the height of Robespierre's power, and renamed again to Victoire at the Thermidorian Reaction.

As Victoire, under captain Savary, she took part in the campaign off Italy, where she confronted Nelson's squadron. She served off Canada in 1796, returned to France, and was deemed too old to take part in the landing in Ireland.

== Fate ==
Victoire was condemned in Brest in 1798 as it is written in her last log.
