= Léon Guérin =

French author, poet, and naval historian

Léon Guérin (French pronunciation: [leɔ̃ ɡeʁɛ̃]; 1807–1885) was a French writer, poet, and naval historian.

Guérin started writing tales and short stories under his given name, as well as the pen names Guérin-Dulion and Léonide de Mirbel. In 1829, he published Chants Lyriques et Autres Essais Poétiques. He then founded two children's newspapers|newspapers, the Journal des Enfants, and later the Gazette des Enfants et des Jeunes Personnes.

Later in life, Guérin specialised as a historian, and became one of the historiographs of the French Navy in 1846.

== Works ==
- Chronique du Café de Paris: Le Jeune Homme, 1838
- Les Trois Fils du Capitaine: Voyage dans l'Amérique du Sud et aux Antilles, 1841
- Voyages du Jeune Edmond au-delà du Gange et dans L'Empire Chinois, 1841
- L'Élève de Marine: Voyages dans l'Amérique Septentrionale, 1841
- Le Tour du Monde, ou, Les Mille et Une Merveilles des Voyages, 1842
- Les Voix Naïves: Contes Moraux Destinés à la Jeunesse, 1843
- Histoire Maritime de France, 1844
- Les Marins Illustres de la France, 1845
- Les Jeunes Navigateurs: Autour du Monde, 1845
- L'Europe, Histoire des Nations Européennes, 1846
- Les Navigateurs français: Histoire des Navigations, Découvertes et Colonisations françaises, Paris, 1846
- Histoire de la Marine Contemporaine: Depuis 1784 Jusqu'à 1848, 1855
- Histoire de la Dernière Guerre de Russie (1853–1856) dans la Mer, 1858
