= Charles Barthélemy =

French historian and archaeologist

- Born: 1825; Paris
- Died: 1888 (aged 62–63)
- Occupations: Historian and Archaeologist

Charles Barthélemy (Paris, 1825–1888) was a 19th-century French historian and archaeologist.

== Biography ==
A Catholic Church, he was a member of the Pontifical Academy of Saint Thomas Aquinas.

In 1850, he founded L'Érudition, a monthly magazine that lasted three years.

He was one of the authors of Mame's Bibliothèque de la jeunesse chrétienne for history books.

== Publications ==
(select list)

- 1854: Histoire de la Bretagne ancienne et moderne
- 1854: Rational ou manuel des divins offices, ou, Raisons mystiques et historiques de la liturgie catholique, a translation of a work by Guillaume Durand.
- 1856: Histoire de la Russie, depuis les temps les plus reculés jusqu'à nos jours
- 1859: Histoire de la Turquie
- Histoire de la Normandie ancienne et moderne
- 1862–1883: Erreurs et mensonges historiques - 18 volumes.
- 1882: La comédie de Dancourt
- 1884: La guerre de 1870-71
- 1885: le consulat et l'Empire
- 1886: Histoire de la comédie en France des origines à nos jours
- 1886: Les quarante fauteuils de l'Académie française, 1634-1886
- Les Confessions de Freron (1719-1776): Sa Vie, Souvenirs Intimes et Anecdotiques, ses Pensées

More complete list of his works in Dictionnaire international des écrivains du jour, De Gubernatis, 1888
