= French frigate Alcmène (1774) =

History

France
- Name: Alcmène
- Ordered: 27 September 1772
- Builder: Toulon
- Laid down: May 1773
- Launched: 14 June 1774
- Captured: 20 October 1779 by the Royal Navy
- Fate: Sold 1784

General characteristics
- Class & type: Alcmène-class frigate
- Type: frigate
- Displacement: 966 tonneaux
- Tons burthen: 500 port tonneaux
- Length: 40.3 metres
- Beam: 10.4 metres
- Depth of hold: 4.8 metres
- Propulsion: Sails
- Armament: 26 × 12-pounder long guns

Alcmène was 26-gun frigate of the French Navy, designed by Doumet, lead ship of her class. She notably took part in the War of American Independence.

== Career ==
In 1775, Alcmène cruised in the Caribbean with the 18-gun corvette Flèche. In 1776, she was under Suffren.

In 1778, she was part of the French expeditionary forces to America, under Bonneval, and blockaded Rhodes Island. In August, she destroyed a British corvette and two galley, along with Aimable.

On 16 August 1779, Alcmène was sent to escort a convoy, along with the 64-gun Protecteur and the 50-gun Fier. A storm scattered the escort and damaged Alcmène, which had to throw most of her guns overboard to stay afloat. On 20 October 1779, as Alcmène was nearing Martinique, she encountered HMS Proserpine which captured her.

== Fate ==
The British took Alcmène in service as HMS Alcmene. She was sold in 1784.
