= French ship Zélé (1763) =

Ship of the line of the French Navy

History

France
- Name: Zélé
- Namesake: "Zealous"
- Ordered: 9 December 1761
- Builder: Toulon (plans by Coulomb)
- Laid down: February 1762
- Launched: 1 July 1763
- In service: 1764
- Out of service: 1806
- Fate: Broken up 1806
- Notes: Offered by the receveurs généraux des finances

General characteristics
- Displacement: 2900 tonneaux
- Tons burthen: 1500 port tonneaux
- Length: 55.39 m (181 ft 9 in)
- Beam: 14.13 m (46 ft 4 in)
- Draught: 6.71 m (22 ft 0 in)
- Depth of hold: 6.98 m (22 ft 11 in)
- Armament: 74 guns: Lower gundeck: 28 × 36-pounder long guns; Upper gundeck: 30 × 24-pounder long guns; Forecastle and quarterdeck: 16 × 8-pounder long guns

Zélé was a 74-gun ship of the line of the French Navy. She was funded by a don des vaisseaux donation from the Régisseur général des finances.

== Career ==
On 6 July 1779, she participated in the Battle of Grenada as a member of the vanguard. Under Bruyères-Chalabre, she was part of the French blockade during Siege of Savannah in 1779.

In 1781 and 1782, was part of de Grasse's fleet in the naval operations in the American Revolutionary War. She took part in the Invasion of Tobago in May 1781 and in the Battle of the Chesapeake on 5 September 1781. under Charles-René de Gras-Préville.

In the night of 11 to 12 April 1782, Zélé collided with Ville de Paris, damaging Zélé which had to be taken in tow to repair at Martinique. This precipitated the French disorganisation and subsequent defeat in the Battle of the Saintes later that day.

Zélé was broken up in May 1806.
