= Louis-Armand de La Poype de Vertrieux =

French Navy officer and statesman

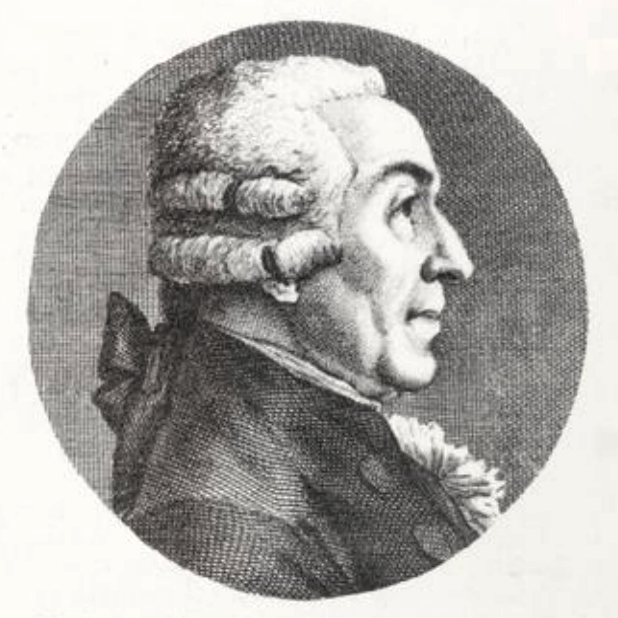
- Born: 2 February 1721; Paris, France
- Died: 12 May 1801 (aged 80) London, UK
- Branch: French Navy
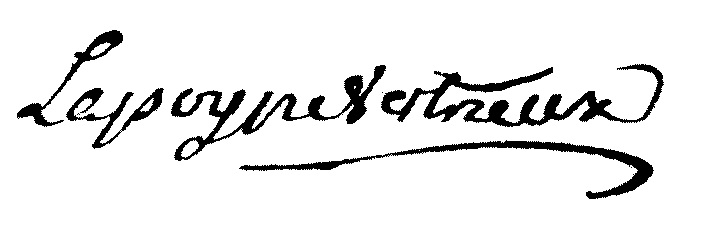
- Signature

Louis-Armand de La Poype de Vertrieu (Paris, 2 February 1721 – London, 12 May 1801) was a French Navy officer and statesman.

== Biography ==
In 1763, Vertrieux was given command of the frigate Pléïade for a mission against the Salé Rovers. The Pléïade patrolled between Oran and Algiers, with Suffren as first officer and Flotte as second officer, and was accompanied by the xebecs Singe and Caméléon. On 15 July 1763, Singe mistakenly engaged a galiot from Algiers, mistaking it for a Salé rover. Pléïade intervened and fired two broadsides into the galiot, which sank with all hands before the error was realised. This triggered a diplomatic incident and Captain Fabry had to negotiate a resolution to the crisis. Vertrieux fell out of favour due to the incident.

== Sources and references ==
Bibliography

- Contenson, Ludovic (1934). La Société des Cincinnati de France et la guerre d'Amérique (1778-1783). Paris: éditions Auguste Picard. OCLC 7842336.
- Moulin, Stéphane (1922). La Carrière d'un Marin au XVIIIème siècle; Joseph de Flotte 1734-1792. Gap: éditions Jean et Peyrot. OCLC 902496109.
- Lacour-Gayet, Georges (1905). La marine militaire de la France sous le règne de Louis XVI. Paris: Honoré Champion. OCLC 763372623.
- Taillemite, Étienne (2002). Dictionnaire des Marins français. Tallandier. ISBN 2-84734-008-4. OCLC 606770323.
