= Onésime-Joachim Troude =

French Navy officer and naval historian (1807–1886)

- Born: 31 January 1807; Brest, France
- Died: 1886 (aged 78–79) Brest, France
- Branch: French Navy
- Rank: Capitaine de frégate
- Conflicts: Invasion of Algiers in 1830
- Other work: Batailles navales de la France

Onésime-Joachim Troude (Brest, 31 January 1807 – Brest, 1886) was a French Navy officer and later naval historian.

== Career ==
Born the fourth child of Amable Troude, Onésime-Joachim Troude had a career in the French Navy.

He took part in the Invasion of Algiers in 1830 as an ensign on the Aventure, under Lieutenant Quernel, and was aboard when she was wrecked on 14 May. He survived the ordeal of the 200 marooned sailors when they were captured by Kabyles and 108 were decapitated.

He later rose to the rank of Capitaine de frégate. In 1854, he married Sophie Hamon; together, they had two daughters: Émeline in 1855 and Gabrielle in 1856.

In 1867, he published a four-volume Batailles navales de la France, mimicking William James' plan for his Naval history of Great Britain. Michel Vergé-Franceschi characterises them as promoting commerce raiding and states that they remain a classic to this day.

== Works ==
- Troude, Onésime-Joachim (1867). Batailles navales de la France (in French). Vol. 1. Challamel ainé.
- Troude, Onésime-Joachim (1867). Batailles navales de la France (in French). Vol. 2. Challamel ainé.
- Troude, Onésime-Joachim (1867). Batailles navales de la France (in French). Vol. 3. Challamel ainé.
- Troude, Onésime-Joachim (1867). Batailles navales de la France (in French). Vol. 4. Challamel ainé.
