= Ludovic de Contenson =

French geographer and historian

Ludovic de Contenson (born 28 February 1861 in Lyon – died 1935) was a French geographer and historian.
