= Battle of Saint Kitts =

1782 battle of the American Revolutionary War

- Part of the American Revolutionary War and the Anglo-French War (1778–1783)
- The Battle of Frigate Bay, 26 January 1782; Nicholas Pocock, 1784
Date	25–26 January 1782
Location	Off Basseterre, Caribbean Sea 17°09′N 62°35′W
Result	British victory

Belligerents
(Kingdom of Great Britain) Great Britain	France

Commanders and leaders
(Kingdom of Great Britain) Sir Samuel Hood	(Kingdom of France) Comte de Grasse

Strength
22 ships of the line	29 ships of the line 2 frigates 1 cutter

Casualties and losses
72 killed 244 wounded	107 killed 204 wounded 1 cutter captured

The Battle of Saint Kitts, also known as the Battle of Frigate Bay, was fought between 25 and 26 January 1782 during the American Revolutionary War between a British fleet under Rear-Admiral of the Blue Sir Samuel Hood and a larger French fleet under François Joseph Paul de Grasse.

== Background ==
When Rear-Admiral of the Blue Sir Samuel Hood returned to the West Indies in late 1781 after the Battle of the Chesapeake, he was for a time in independent command owing to Admiral of the White Sir George Rodney's absence in England. The French admiral, François Joseph Paul de Grasse, attacked the British islands of Saint Kitts and Nevis with 7,000 troops and 50 warships, including the 110-gun Ville de Paris. He started by besieging the British fortress on Brimstone Hill on 11 January 1782. Hoping to salvage the situation, Hood made for Saint Kitts by departing Antigua on 22 January with 22 ships of the line, compared to de Grasse's 36.

== Battle ==
The British fleet on 24 January consisted of 22 sail of the line, and was close off the southeast end of Nevis. They ran into and captured the French 16-gun cutter Espion, which carried a large amount of ammunition for the besieging French forces at Brimstone Hill.

At daybreak on 25 January, the French fleet was discovered having stood to the southward of Basseterre, consisting of a 110-gun ship, 28 two-decked ships, and two frigates. Hood stood towards the French fleet with the apparent intention of bringing on action, and effectively drew the French fleet off the land. As soon as Hood effected this maneuver, he was aided by a favorable change in wind and was able to guide his fleet within the anchorage of Basseterre, which the French admiral had just quit. Hood ordered his fleet in an L-formation and then ordered his fleet to lay anchor. De Grasse made three distinct attacks upon the British fleet on 26 January but was repulsed.

The Pluton, commanded by D'Albert de Rions, led the French line, "receiving the crashing broadside of ship after ship until the splintered planking flew from her off side and her rigging hung in a tangled mass." Chauvent goes on to describe the battle as "...a sulphurous hell, with cannon vomiting forth flame and death." The entire battle lasted from 7:00 am to 6:30 pm, with the major action in the afternoon.

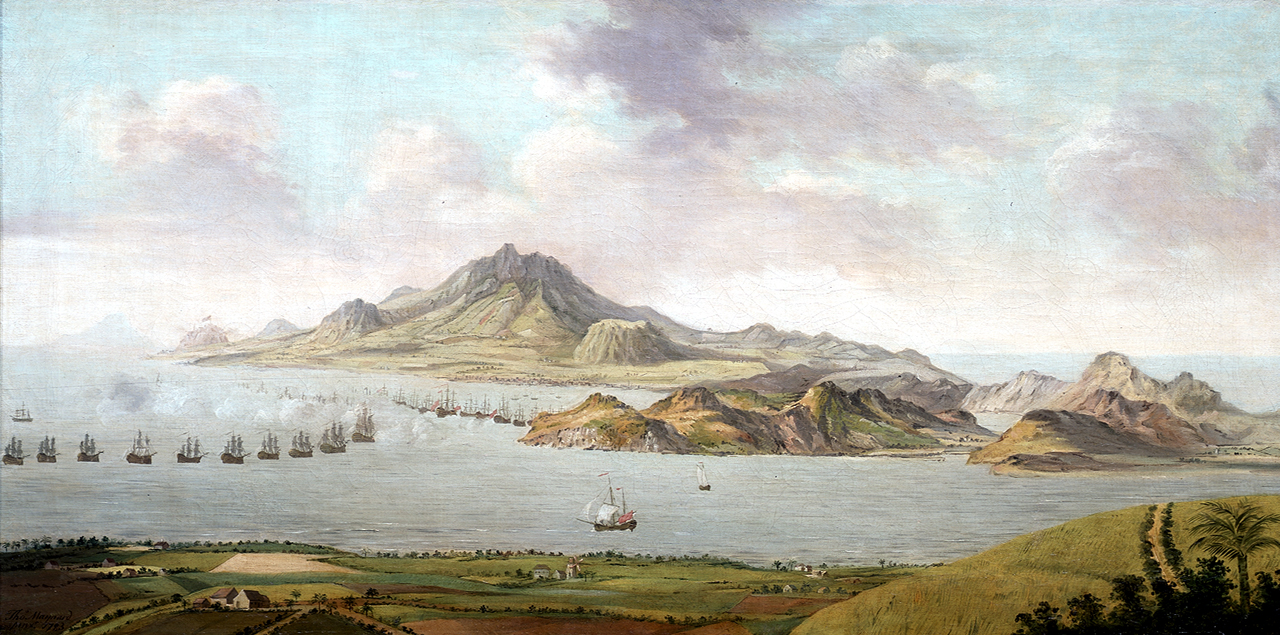
Repulse of the French in Frigate Bay, St Kitts, 26 January 1782 by Thomas Maynard

== Aftermath ==
Damage on both sides was heavy, though the French suffered higher casualties. However, Hood was unable to stop the French and could only observe the land action. After the successful French siege of Brimstone Hill, Saint Kitts and Nevis both surrendered on 12 February. Hood left on the 14th and joined forces with the recently arrived Rodney.

== Order of battle ==
=== Britain ===
Admiral Sir Samuel Hood's fleet
Ship	Rate	Guns	Commander	Casualties			Notes
Ship	Rate	Guns	Commander	Killed	Wounded	Total	Notes
Van
HMS St Albans	Third rate	64	Captain Charles Inglis	0	0	0	
HMS Alcide	Third rate	74	Captain Charles Thompson	2	4	6	
HMS Intrepid	Third rate	64	Captain Anthony James Pye Molloy	2	0	2	
HMS Torbay	Third rate	74	Captain John Lewis Gidoin	0	0	0	
HMS Princessa	Third rate	70	Rear-Admiral Francis Samuel Drake; Captain Charles Knatchbull	2	4	6	Flagship of van
HMS Prince George	Second rate	98	Captain James Williams	1	3	4	
HMS Ajax	Third rate	74	Captain Nicholas Charrington	1	12	13	
Centre
HMS Prince William	Third rate	64	Captain George Wilkinson	0	3	3	
HMS Shrewsbury	Third rate	74	Captain John Knight	3	7	10	
HMS Invincible	Third rate	74	Captain Charles Saxton	0	2	2	
HMS Barfleur	Second rate	98	Rear-Admiral Sir Samuel Hood; Captain Alexander Hood	9	24	33	Flagship of centre
HMS Monarch	Third rate	74	Captain Francis Reynolds	2	2	4	
HMS Belliqueux	Third rate	64	Captain Lord Cranstoun	5	7	12	
HMS Centaur	Third rate	74	Captain John Nicholson Inglefield	0	12	12	
HMS Alfred	Third rate	74	Captain William Bayne	2	20	2	
Rear
HMS Russell	Third rate	74	Captain Henry Edwyn Stanhope	8	29	37	
HMS Resolution	Third rate	74	Captain Lord Robert Manners	5	11	16	
HMS Bedford	Third rate	74	Commodore Edmund Affleck; Captain Thomas Graves	2	15	17	Flagship of Rear
HMS Canada	Third rate	74	Captain William Cornwallis	1	12	13	
HMS Prudent	Third rate	64	Captain Andrew Barclay	18	36	54	
HMS Montagu	Third rate	74	Captain George Bowen	7	23	30	
HMS America	Third rate	64	Captain Samuel Thompson	1	17	18	
Attached frigates
Van
HMS Eurydice	Sixth rate	20	Captain George Wilson	0	0	0	
Centre
HMS Pegasus	Sixth rate	28	Captain John Stanhope	0	0	0	
HMS Fortunee	Sixth rate	28	Captain Hugh Cloberry Christian	0	0	0	
HMS Lizard	Sixth rate	28	Captain Edmund Dod	0	0	0	
HMS Champion	Sixth rate	20	Captain Thomas West	1	1	2	To repeat signals
HMS Convert	Fifth rate	32	Captain Henry Harvey	0	0	0	
HMS Triton	Sixth rate	28	Captain John M’Laurin	0	0	0	
Rear
HMS Sibyl	Sixth rate	28	Captain John Norton	0	0	0	
HMS Solebay	Sixth rate	28	Captain Charles Everitt	0	0	0	
Total recorded casualties: 72 killed, 244 wounded

=== France ===
Admiral de Grasse's fleet
Division	Ship	Guns	Commander	Casualties			Notes
Division	Ship	Guns	Commander	Killed	Wounded	Total	Notes
	Souverain	74	Glandevès du Castellet				
	Hercule	74	Chadeau de la Clocheterie				
	Languedoc	80	Arros d'Argelos				
	Duc de Bourgogne	80	Champmartin; Barras de Saint-Laurent (Lieutenant General)				
	Marseillais	74	Castellane Majastre				
	Jason	64	Couète de Villages				
	Magnanime	74	Le Bègue de Germiny				
	Zélé	74	Gras-Préville				
	Éveillé	64	Le Gardeur de Tilly				
	Saint-Esprit	80	Chabert-Cogolin				
	Sceptre	74	Vaudreuil				
	Ville de Paris	104	De Grasse (Lieutenant General); Cresp de Saint-Césaire (Flag captain)				
	César	74	Coriolis d'Espinouse				
	Northumberland	74	Bricqueville				
	Diadème	74	Monteclerc				
	Glorieux	74	Pérusse des Cars				
	Citoyen	74	De Thy				
	Scipion	74	Dassas				
	Ardent	64	Bernard de Marigny				
	Neptune	74	Renaud d'Aleins				
	Auguste	80	Bougainville (Chef d'Escadre); Castellan (flag captain)				
	Bourgogne	74	Charritte				
	Pluton	74	Albert de Rions				
	Caton	64	Framond				
	Sagittaire	50	Montluc de la Bourdonnaye				
	Experiment	50	Médine				
