= Battle of the Saintes =

1782 battle of the American Revolutionary War

- Part of the American Revolutionary War
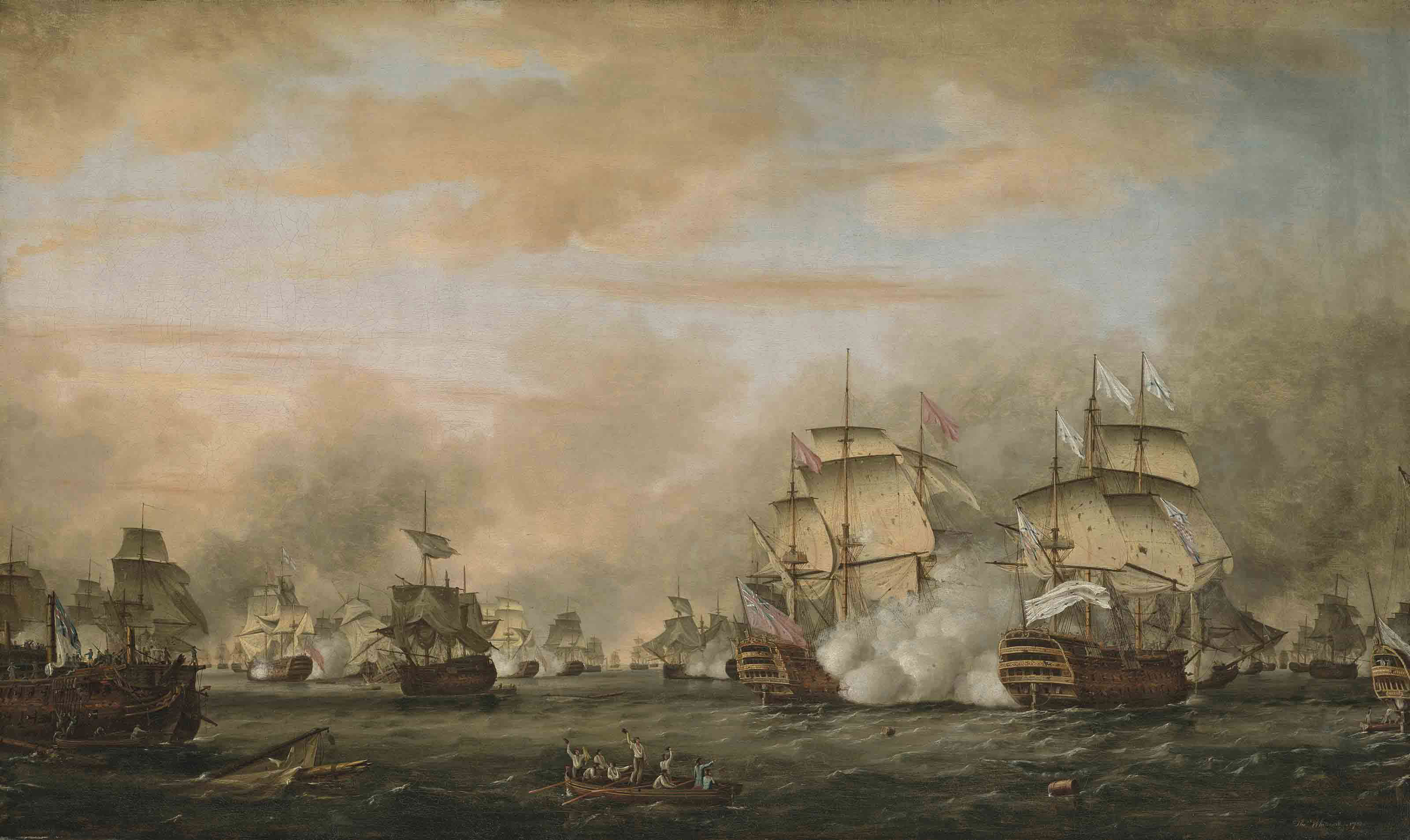
- 1783 painting of the battle
Date	9–12 April 1782
Location	Off Dominica, Caribbean Sea 15°47′N 61°36′W
Result	British victory

Belligerents
Great Britain	France

Commanders and leaders
Sir George Rodney; Francis Samuel Drake	Comte de Grasse (surrendered); Louis de Bougainville

Strength
36 ships of the line	30 ships of the line

Casualties and losses
243 killed 816 wounded	Modern estimates: 3,000 killed or wounded 5,000–6,000 captured 4 ships of the line captured 1 ship of the line destroyed Older figures: 3,000 killed 6,000 wounded

The Battle of the Saintes (known to the French as the Bataille de la Dominique), also known as the Battle of Dominica, was fought between the British and French navies on 9–12 April 1782 off Dominica during the American Revolutionary War. A British fleet under Admiral of the White Sir George Rodney defeated a French fleet under Lieutenant général des armées navales François Joseph Paul de Grasse, forcing France and Spain to abandon a planned invasion of Britain's colony of Jamaica.

The battle is named after the Îles des Saintes, a group of small islands between Guadeloupe and Dominica in the West Indies. The French navy had blockaded a British army under Lord Cornwallis in Virginia the year before during the siege of Yorktown, and supported the eventual American victory in the war. Rodney's victory, however, halted their momentum and had a significant effect on peace negotiations to end the war. The battle is considered by a number of historians to be Britain's most significant victory over the French during the conflict.

De Grasse's fleet suffered up to 15,000 casualties at the battle, one of whom was de Grasse himself, who was taken prisoner. Four French ships of the line were captured (including de Grasse's flagship) and another was destroyed, while the British lost no ships and suffered just over 1,000 casualties. Rodney was credited with pioneering the tactic of "breaking the line" in the battle, though this is disputed. Following the battle, Rodney and his fleet were rewarded for their victory, although the admiral was criticized for not winning a more complete victory.

== Background ==
In October 1781 Lieutenant général des armées navales François Joseph Paul de Grasse, commander of the French fleet in the West Indies; Francisco de Saavedra, General Bureau for the Spanish Indies; and Bernardo de Gálvez, court representative and the Spanish Governor of Louisiana, developed a plan against British forces. The strategic objectives of the Franco-Spanish military forces in the West Indies in this plan were:

- to aid the Americans and defeat the British naval squadron at New York
- to capture the British Windward Islands and
- to conquer Jamaica.

This plan became known as the "De Grasse–Saavedra Convention." The first objective had been essentially met by the surrender of the British army under General Cornwallis at the Siege of Yorktown in September 1781. De Grasse and his fleet had played a decisive part in that victory, after which they returned to the Caribbean. On arrival in Saint-Domingue in November 1781, the admiral was notified to proceed with a plan for the conquest of Jamaica.

Jamaica was the largest and most profitable British island in the Caribbean, mainly because of sugar: it was more valuable to the British economy than all of the 13 American colonies. King George III wrote to Lord Sandwich, saying that he would protect Britain's important Caribbean islands at the risk of Britain herself, and this was the strategy implemented in 1779. Sugar made up 20% of all British imports and was worth five times as much as tobacco. The French and Spanish were fighting to take over Jamaica in order to expel the British from the West Indies, and to strike a massive blow against the British economy. The courts at Paris and Madrid perceived the invasion of Jamaica as an alternative to the Spanish and French attempts to take Gibraltar, which for two years had been a costly disaster.

Whilst de Grasse waited for reinforcements to undertake the Jamaica campaign, he captured St. Kitts in February 1782. The rest of the Windward Islands—Antigua, St. Lucia, and Barbados—still remained under British control. Admiral of the White Sir George Rodney arrived in the Caribbean theatre the following month, bringing reinforcements. These included 17 ships of the line and gave the British a slight numerical advantage.

On 7 April 1782, de Grasse set out from Martinique with 35 ships of the line, including two 50-gun ships and a large convoy of more than 100 cargo ships, to meet with a Spanish fleet of 12 ships of the line. In addition de Grasse was to rendezvous with 15,000 troops at Saint Domingue, who were earmarked for the conquest and intended to land on Jamaica's north coast. Rodney, on learning of this, sailed from St. Lucia in pursuit with 36 ships of the line the following day.

The British ships' hulls by this time had been given copper sheathing to protect them from marine growth, fouling, and saltwater corrosion, dramatically improving speed and overall sailing performance in good wind.

=== Opposing fleets and officers ===
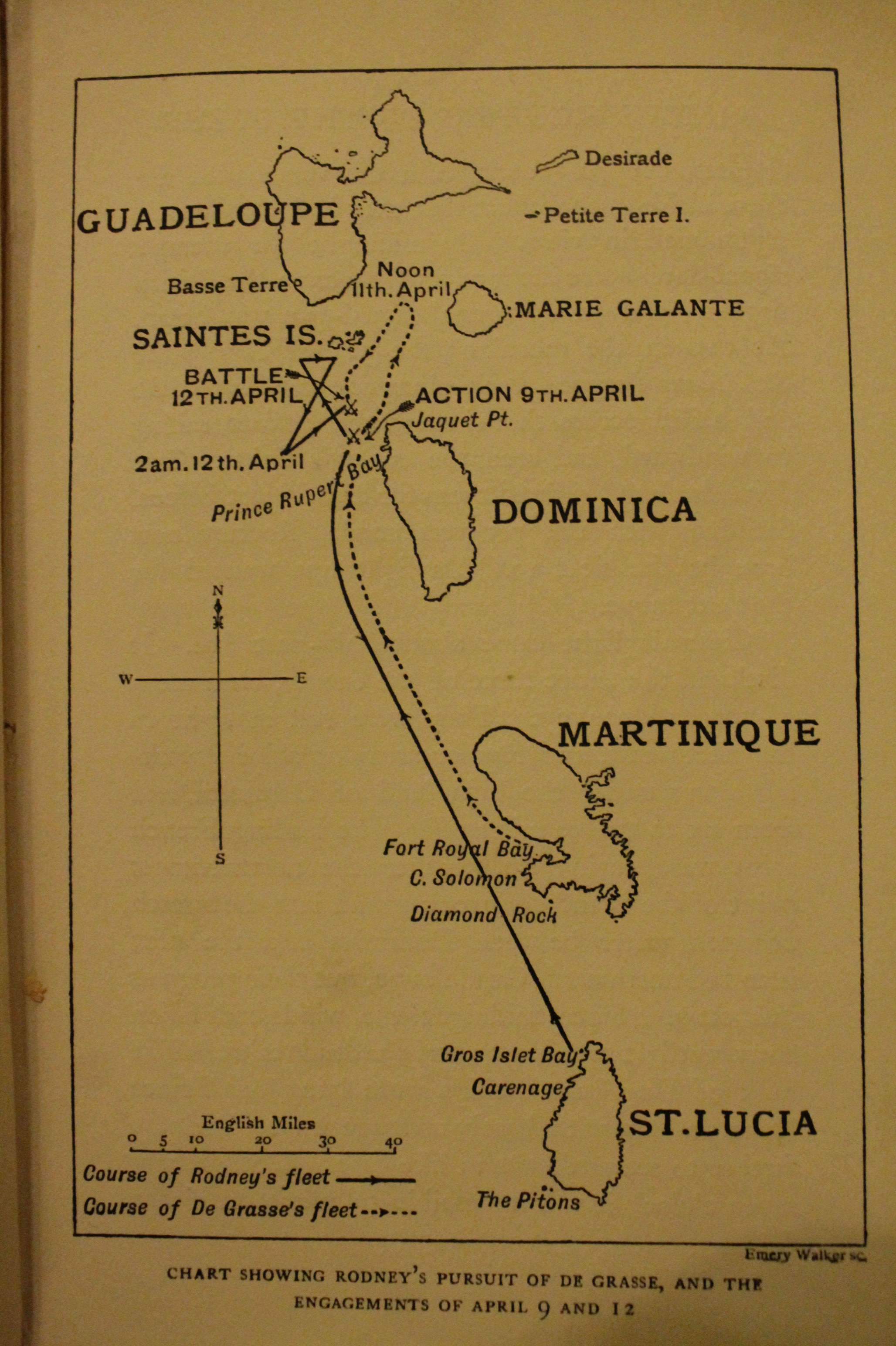
Plan of the early ship movements leading to the Battle of the Saintes in April 1782

The British flagship was HMS Formidable under Rodney. Second in command was Rear-Admiral of the Blue Sir Samuel Hood, and third was Rear-Admiral of the Red Francis Samuel Drake. As was the convention of the day, the fleet was split into three sections: Rodney had individual control as Admiral of the White of 12 ships flying the White Ensign; Drake had command of 12 ships as Rear-Admiral of the Red flying the Red Ensign; and Hood, as Rear-Admiral of the Blue, commanded 12 ships flying the Blue Ensign.

Formidable was accompanied by three 98-gun ships: HMS Barfleur (commanded by Hood), HMS Prince George, and HMS Duke, plus the 90-gun HMS Namur. The remaining 31 ships were equipped with 64 to 74 guns. In total the British fleet had 2,620 guns compared to the French total of 2,526. Most of the British fleet was equipped with carronades on the upper decks, which had a major advantage in flexibility and were a great advantage at close quarters.

In March 1782 Formidable was stationed at Gros Islet Bay between the island of St. Lucia and Pigeon Island. She was under Rodney's command, serving as his flagship at the head of 36 ships of the line. Meanwhile, de Grasse commanded 34 ships of the line at Fort Royal Bay in Martinique. Rodney had been dispatched from Britain with 12 well-fitted ships to rescue the West Indies from a series of attacks from the French, which had already resulted in the loss of several islands. They joined 24 ships on St. Lucia who had already seen action against the French and were undergoing repairs.

The French had allies in the Spanish, who had 13 ships of the line at Cap‑Français on the island of San Domingo (Hispaniola). Together with transport ships, the Spanish had a considerable force of 24,000 men. They awaited the arrival of a further 10,000 French troops dispatched from Brest, under escort of five men-of-war, to further boost their strength. The plan was for Grasse's fleet, with at least 5,000 further troops, to unite with the Spanish at Cap‑Français, and from there to attack and capture the island of Jamaica with their conjoined armada of some 60 ships and 40,000 troops.

Rodney had been in communication with de Grasse during March, organising the exchange of prisoners, who were conveyed by HMS Alert under Captain Vashon. The two officers had much mutual respect. Rodney's task was to intercept the French fleet en route to Cap‑Français.

Grasse's vice admiral at the time was Louis-Philippe de Rigaud, Marquis de Vaudreuil. Third in command was Louis Antoine de Bougainville. The French flagship was the huge 104-gun Ville de Paris. The troops were under the command of the Marquis de Bouillé. The French fleet was also split into three squadrons: Grasse led the "Cornette Blanche;" Bougainville led the "Escadre Bleue;" and Vaudreuil as a second-in-command flew the mixed white and blue colours of the "Blanche et Bleue."

Other British commanders included Captain Lord Robert Manners of HMS Resolution, Admiral William Cornwallis in command of HMS Canada, and HMS Monarch under the command of Captain Francis Reynolds. Other aristocrats present included Captain Lord Cranstoun, a supernumerary onboard Formidable. Sir Charles Douglas, a nephew of Charles Douglas, 3rd Duke of Queensberry, was Captain of the Fleet. Sir James Wallace was also present. Other commanders included Captains Blair, Buckner, Burnett, Charrington, Cornish, Dumaresq, Graves, Inglefield, Inglis, Knight, Parrey, Saumarez, Savage, Symons, Truscott, Wilkinson, Williams, and Wilson. Frederick Thesiger, Acting Lieutenant on board Formidable, was appointed as Rodney's aide-de-camp shortly before the battle.

A lookout squadron, a line of frigates headed by Captain George Anson Byron on HMS Andromache, reported all of de Grasse's movements at Fort Royal. This squadron included the speedy HMS Agamemnon and HMS Magnificent.

=== Pre-battle movements ===
Naval Commanders
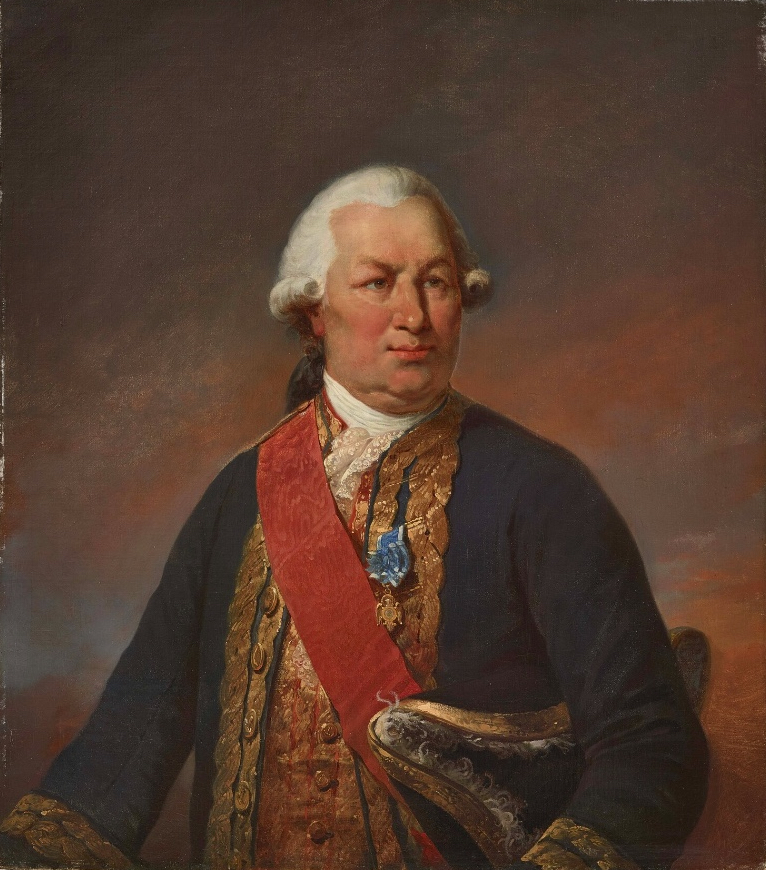
Comte de Grasse

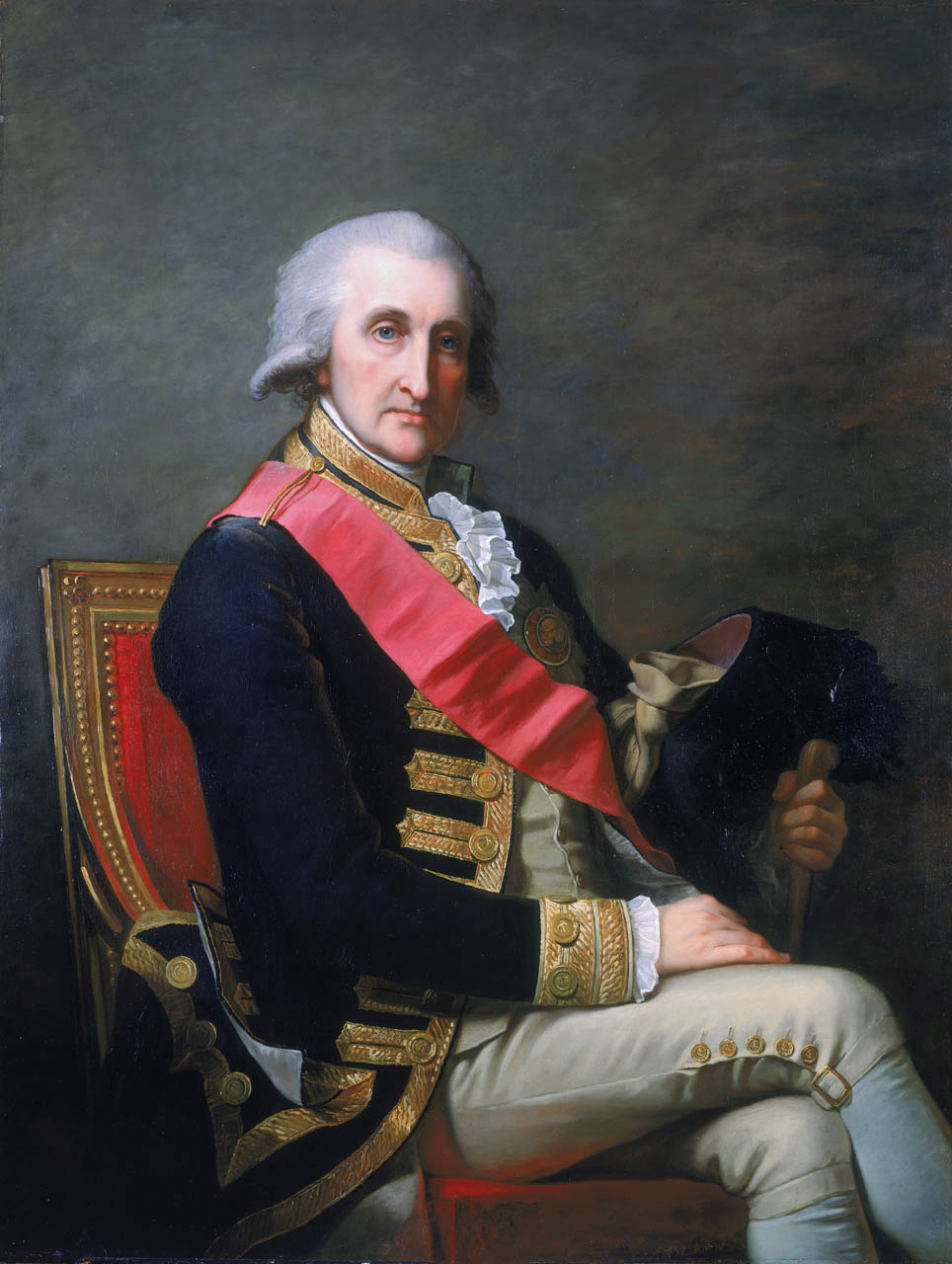
George Rodney

On 3 April it was signalled that the repairs on the French fleet were complete. On 5 April it was reported that the French troops were boarding the ships. At 8:00 am on Sunday 8 April, it was reported that the French fleet were leaving Fort Royal. Rodney's fleet called all men to join their ships and they began leaving Gros Islet Bay at 10:30 am.

The total French armada comprised 35 ships of the line, 10 frigates, and over 100 smaller ships. The smaller ships moved in advance of the men-of-war, heading for St. Pierre.

Just past 4:00 pm Hood's Barfleur, at the head of the British fleet, espied five sails ahead that she presumed to be part of the French fleet. These came into view of Formidable around two hours later, just before sunset. They pursued the French through the night. At 2:00 am on 9 April, HMS St Albans dropped alongside Formidable, reporting that along with HMS Valiant, she had located the French fleet in the darkness. Rodney rested for the remainder of the night.

The sun rose at 5:30 am. The French fleet extended from six to 12 miles distant, navigating the waters between Dominica and Guadeloupe. The majority of the warships lay off Prince Rupert's Bay.

Due to a dead calm from 3:00 until 7:00 am, neither fleet could move. The initial wind only reached Barfleur and its eight support ships, causing them to detach ahead of the main fleet, which lay in the lee of Dominica. De Grasse saw the opportunity to cripple this advanced section and wheeled to begin the first attack.

== Battle ==
On 9 April 1782 the copper-sheathed British fleet caught up with the French, who were surprised by their speed. De Grasse ordered the French convoy to head into Guadeloupe for repair, forcing him to escort two 50-gun ships (Fier and Experiment), and placing his fleet in line of battle in order to cover the retreat.

=== First encounters ===
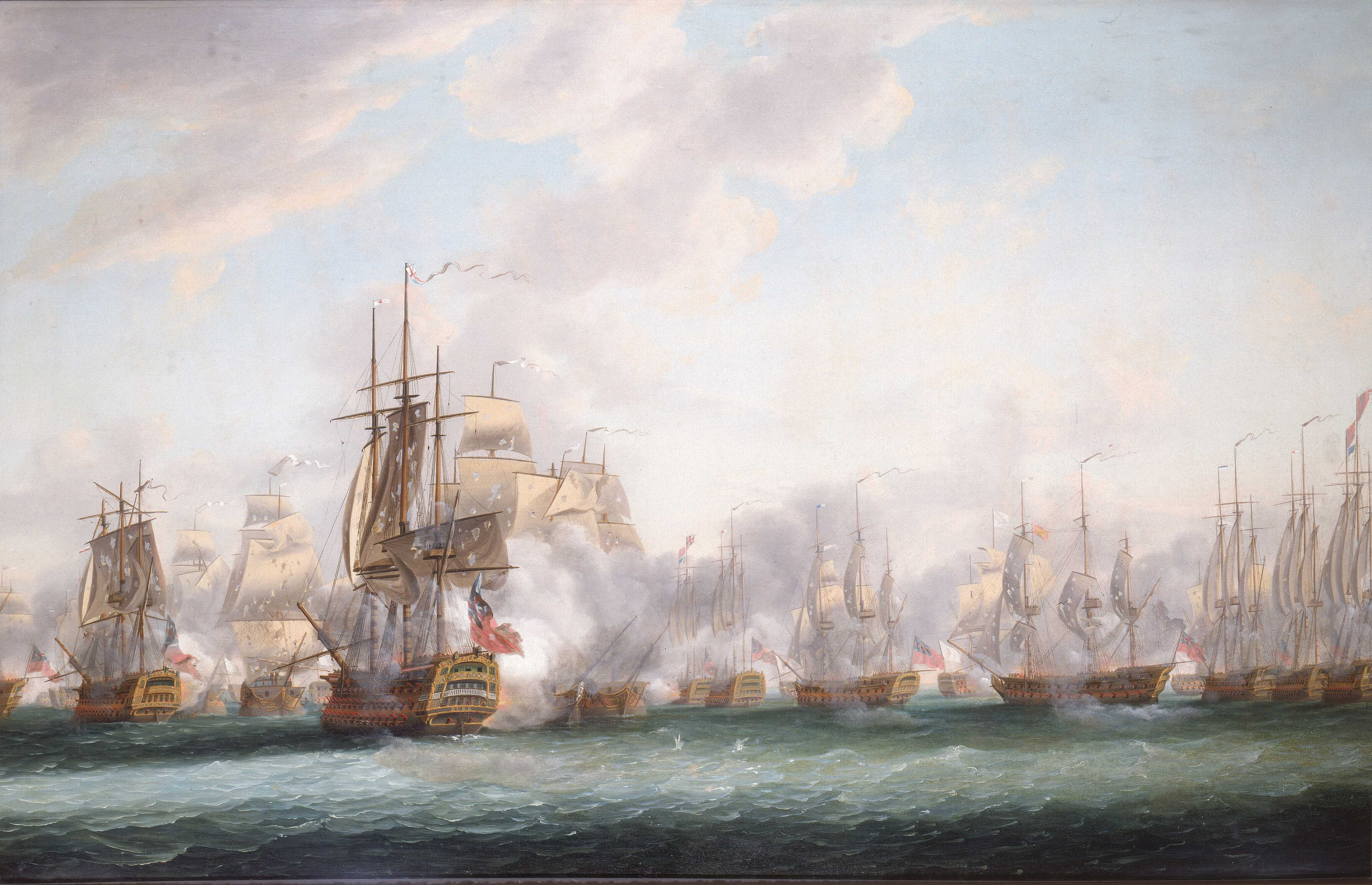
Battle of the Saintes, April 1782 by Nicholas Pocock

Hood's section of the fleet, headed by Barfleur, braced for the first attack. As the first action, HMS Alfred taunted the 18 approaching French ships under de Vaudreuil by exposing her broadside to the approaching French, but without consequence. The British patiently awaited the formal signal from Rodney on Formidable, some six miles behind, and eventually received a red flag signal telling them to "engage the enemy." As the wind rose around noon, it enabled most of the French fleet and part of the British fleet (including Rodney in Formidable) to join the melee. At this point the French outnumbered the British two to one. Captain William Bayne on Alfred was killed during this action.

After an inconclusive encounter during which both sides suffered damage, de Grasse realised that the remainder of the British fleet would soon be upon them and broke off the engagement to withdraw a safe distance. De Grasse moved his ships to the Saintes Islands to the north (south of Guadeloupe). Meanwhile, Rodney reversed the order of his line to bring Drake's hitherto undamaged ships to the front, and allow Hood to undertake repairs in the rear lines.

On 10 April the French began 10 miles distant but did not turn to engage, instead continuing on their original course, and by nightfall had increased their separation to 15 miles. This appears to be partly due to the incorrect presumption on Rodney's part that the French were going to turn to engage.

On Wednesday 11 April two French ships, Zélé and Magnanime, who had accidentally collided and fallen behind the main French fleet, came into view around noon. Rodney decided that attacking these two ships would cause de Grasse to return to protect them, which worked: a large section of the French fleet turned to protect the pair. These movements were executed without any physical attacks.

=== Main engagement ===
On 12 April the French were ranged from six to 12 miles distant and were not in formation, as the two fleets manoeuvred between the northern end of Dominica and the Saintes in the Saintes Passage. The unfortunate Zélé had had a second collision during the night with one of its rescuers, Ville de Paris, and was now being towed to Basse-Terre in Guadeloupe by Astrée with General de Bouillé on board. They were chased by four British ships: Monarch, Valiant, HMS Centaur and HMS Belliqueux. De Grasse made for Guadeloupe and bore up with his fleet to protect the ship. At the same time, Rodney recalled his chasing ships and made the signal for line of battle.

Rear Admiral Hood's van division were still making repairs from the action three days earlier, so he directed his rear division, under Rear Admiral Drake, to take the lead. At 7:40, HMS Marlborough under Captain Taylor Penny led the British line and opened battle when she approached the centre of the French line. Having remained parallel with the French, the ships of Drake's division passed the remaining length of de Grasse's line and the two sides exchanged broadsides, a typical naval engagement of the time.

==== Initial attack ====
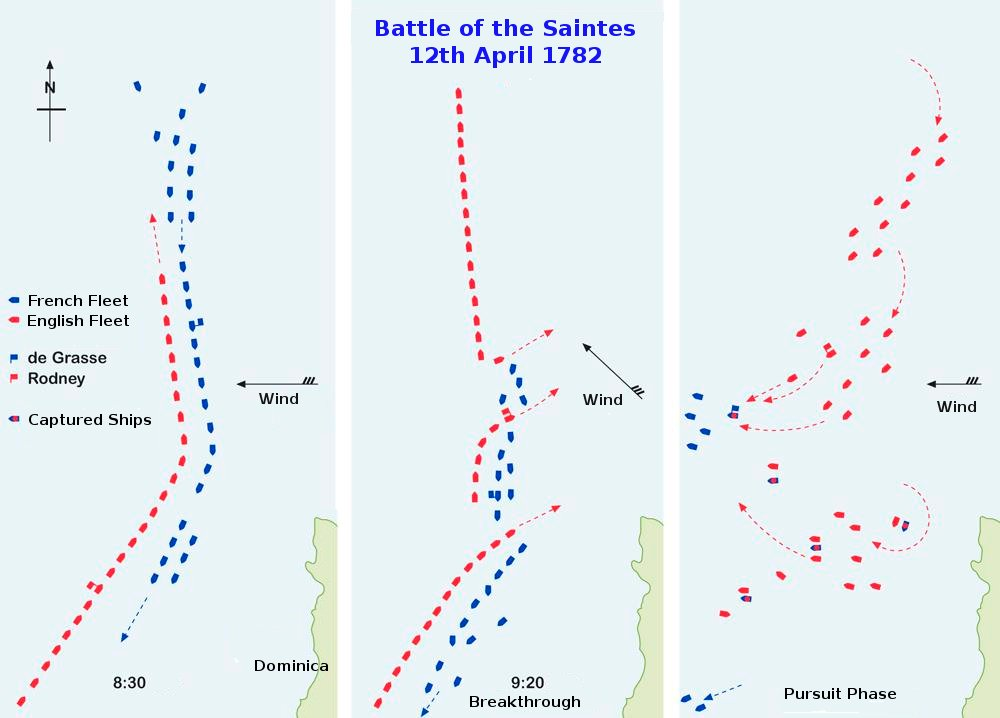
Map showing main stages of the battle

Marlborough headed the British attack. As the battle progressed, the strong winds of the previous day and night began to temper and became more variable. As the French line passed down the British line, the sudden shift of wind let Rodney's flagship Formidable and several other ships, including Duke and HMS Bedford, sail toward the French line.

At 8:00 am Formidable raised the red flag to permit Marlborough to open fire and engage the French. At this point Marlborough was opposite Dauphin Royal, who received her full broadside. Sixteen ships in line separated Marlborough from Formidable and each stood 200 metres apart. As each circled past the French, they fired a broadside against them. Second, behind Marlborough, was HMS Arrogant, which had been recently re-equipped and managed three broadsides against one from the French as they passed. Third in line was HMS Alcide under Captain Charles Thomson. Then followed HMS Nonsuch under Captain Truscott, and then HMS Conqueror under Captain George Balfour.

Next in line was Admiral Drake on HMS Princessa, who was in command of the first 12 vessels, and was followed by Prince George under Captain Williams. Then came the 100-year-old HMS Torbay under Captain Keppel and the year-old HMS Anson under Captain William Blair on the main deck, who was struck by round shot at waist level and sliced in two. The blue squadron was then completed by HMS Fame and HMS Russell under Captain James Saumarez.

The white squadron under Rodney followed in exact formation after the blue. This was headed by HMS America under Captain Thompson. HMS Hercules under Captain Henry Savage followed. Then came HMS Prothee under Captain Buckner and Resolution under Captain Robert Manners. The 24-year-old Manners was the first casualty on his ship and was severely injured in both legs and right arm, dying later of these wounds. Resolution was followed by Duke under Captain Alan Gardner.

As Formidable was in the centre of the British line, it took her almost an hour to reach the centre of the action. All ships had to maintain a steady speed, and as she passed de Grasse's flagship, the 104-gun Ville de Paris, the two met for the first time. Ville de Paris was already damaged by the 16 ships ahead of Formidable in the line. Although it was a sunny day, the smoke of the battle was like a dense fog. Formidable entered the smoke and approached Ville de Paris at 8:40 am.

The countermovement of the fleets brought a series of ships opposite Formidable in sequence behind Ville de Paris, movements that brought about a different pairing of enemies every five minutes. Next was Couronne, followed by Éveillé under Le Gardeur de Tilly, and then Sceptre under the command of de Vaudreuil.

==== Breaking the line ====
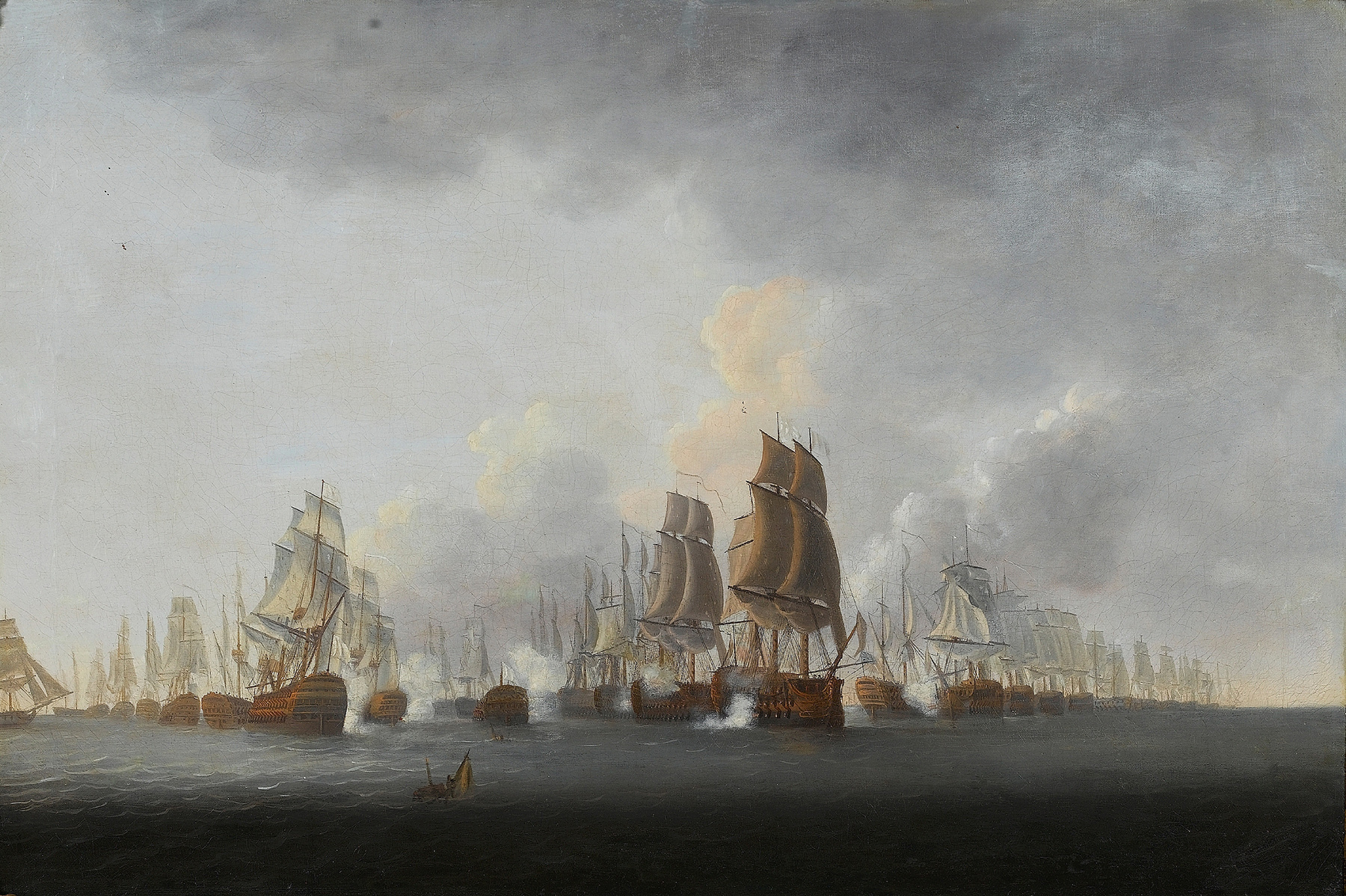
Lord Rodney's flagship Formidable breaking through the French line at the Battle of the Saintes by William Elliott

Within an hour, the wind had shifted to the south, forcing the French line to separate and bear to the west, as it could not hold its course into the wind. This allowed the British to use guns on both sides of their ships without fear of return fire from the front and rear of the French ships, between which they were passing. The effect was greater using the carronades, with which the British had just equipped nearly half their fleet. This relatively new short-range weapon was quicker to reload and more of them could be carried. Glorieux, under command of Captain des Cars, moving in the wake of Ville de Paris, was the next victim. Virtually a sitting duck due to damage in the previous 10 minutes from Duke, she was quickly pounded and dismasted by intense fire.

In the confusion four French ships beginning with Diadem broke out of sequence, partly due to the uncontrollable speed of the mastless Glorieux. Formidable turned to starboard and brought her port guns to bear on them. As a result, Formidable sailed through the gap, breaking the French line. This breach was further followed through by five other British ships. The breach was later recorded by Charles Dashwood, who was a midshipman on Formidable on that day.

Although the concept of "breaking the line" was born here, it is logically of mixed blessings, since in breaking the enemy line, one breaks one's own line. Whilst the movement has the advantage that guns can be fired on both port and starboard sides, it also exposes the ship to attack on both sides. The advantage in this instance was that many of the French gunners left their post, in fear of Formidable's three tiers of guns bearing down on them.

Diadem appears to have fully withdrawn from the battle at this stage, and many presumed her to be sunk. Formidable was followed by Namur under Captain Fanshawe and then St Albans under Captain Inglis. These were followed by the deadly Canada under Captain William Cornwallis, HMS Repulse under Captain Thomas Dumaresq, and HMS Ajax under Captain Nicholas Charrington. Each of these fired further upon the hapless and already crippled Glorieux.

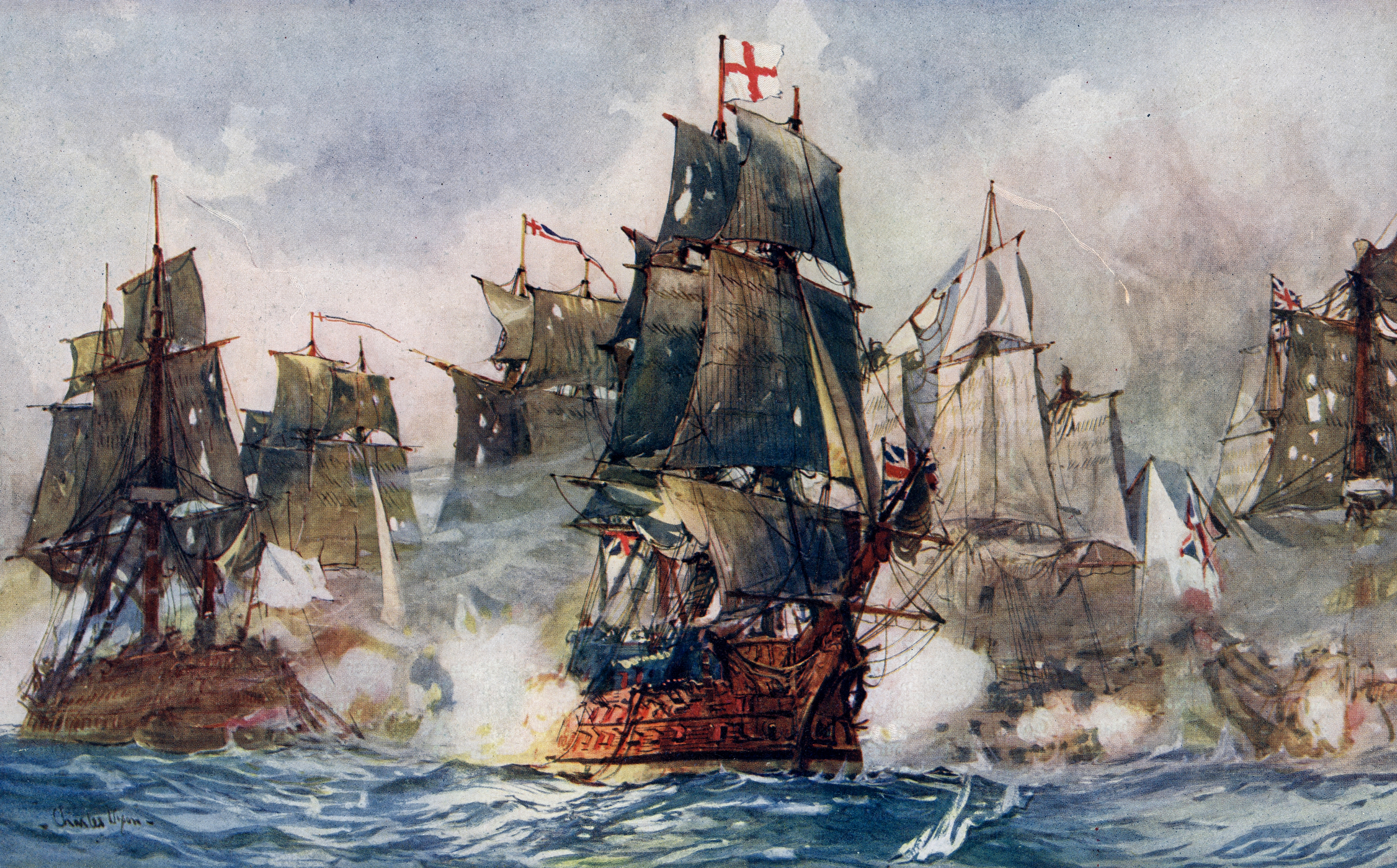
Painting of the battle by Charles Dixon

Simultaneously, and because of the smoke, Commodore Edmund Affleck on Bedford, the hindmost ship of the central white squadron, accidentally sailed through the confused French line, between César and Hector, only to discover this error when no enemy lay on his starboard side in the clearing smoke.

Bedford was followed by Hood's red squadron and this broke the French line into three sections. In the confusion the two leading ships of the rear red squadron, HMS Prince William and Magnificent, had somehow passed Bedford, who was now third in line within the red squadron and completely detached from her own white squadron. The whole red squadron then passed between César and Hector, causing each to be crippled. The final ship of the red squadron, HMS Royal Oak, passed the stern of César and delivered a final blow a few minutes after 11:00 am. Both fleets then drifted apart for some time and became temporarily becalmed.

Around noon, both fleets observed that the waters were teeming with sharks attracted by the noise and blood. French casualties were greatly increased due to the high number of troops packed onto the lower decks: a minimum of 900 per ship and no fewer than 1,300 on Ville de Paris. In order to lessen the confusion, the French had been throwing the dead (and perhaps the near-dead) overboard, a rich feast for the sharks.

=== French retreat ===
The French now lay totally to the leeward of the British fleet, which stood between them and their destination. They had little option on the re-emergence of the wind but to sail west with it and attempt escape. At 1:00 pm the frigate Richemont, under the command of Captain De Mortemart, but with Denis Decrès in charge of the marines, was sent to join a towing cable to the heavily crippled Glorieux. Souverain moved alongside to provide covering fire. However, the British, with both wind and cannon-power in their favour, moved a number of ships up to block this movement.

The captain of Glorieux was already dead, and the ship was now under command of the senior officer remaining, Lieutenant Trogoff de Kerlessi. Souverain and Richmond retreated under heavy fire, and Kerlessi had little choice but to tear the flag from the mast and surrender, which was done to Royal Oak. Captain Burnett used this opportunity to restock his depleted powder supplies. Meanwhile, Monarch stood alongside Andromache, who was acting as a supply ship to the British fleet; 40 barrels of powder were exchanged.

In the next action, around 1:30 pm, Centaur and Bedford attacked the stricken César, captained by Bernard de Marigny, who refused to surrender and was seriously wounded in the first five minutes. Command then fell to his Captain Paul.

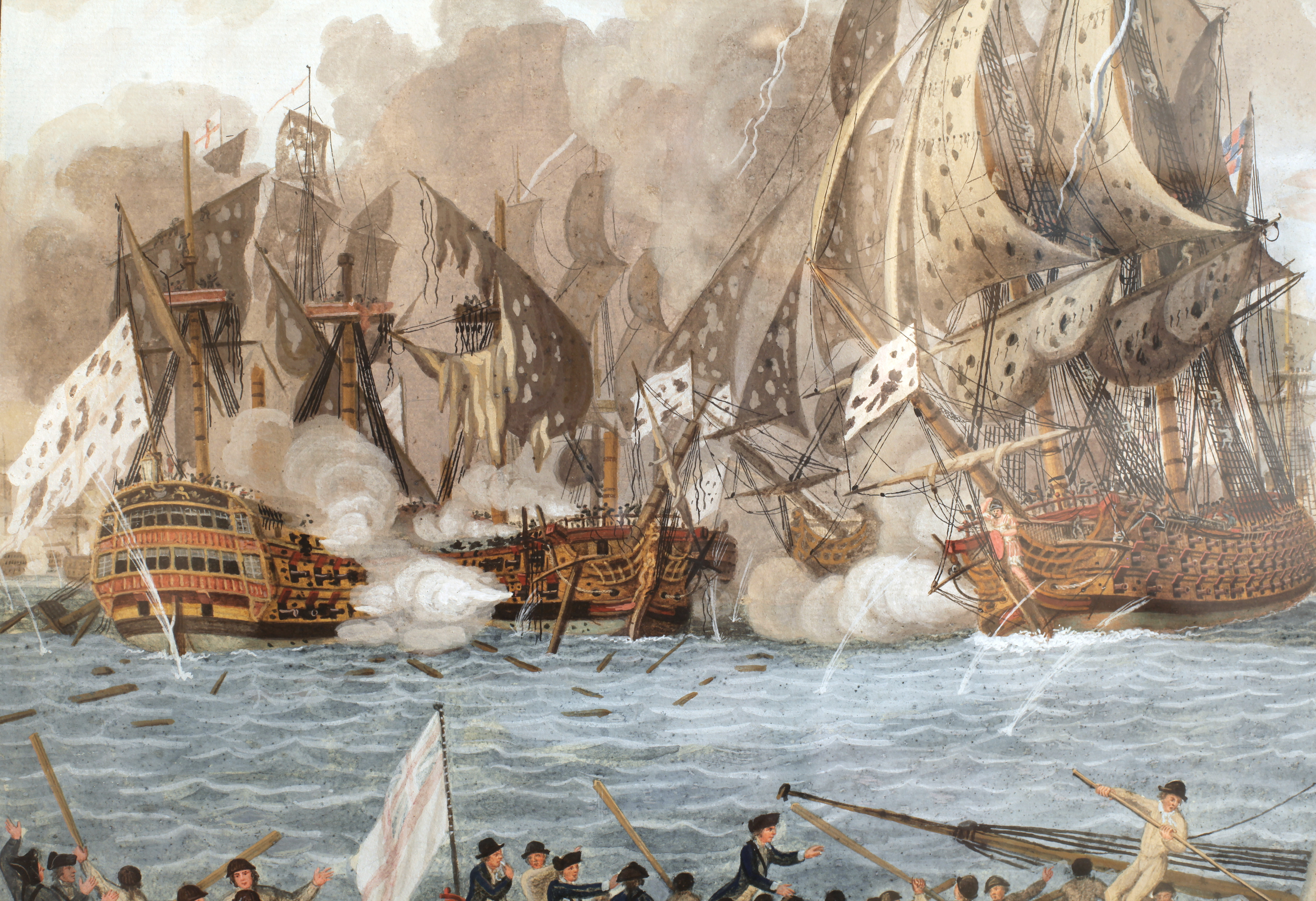
Depiction of the battle by François Aimé Louis Dumoulin

With their formation shattered and many of their ships severely damaged, the French fell away to the southwest in small groups. Rodney attempted to redeploy and make repairs before pursuing the French. By 2:00 pm the wind had freshened and a general chase ensued. As the British pressed south, Ardent was flanked by HMS Belliqueux and HMS Prince William and soon surrendered. They then took possession of Glorieux and caught up with the French rear at around 3pm. De Grasse signalled other ships to protect Ville de Paris, but this was only partially fulfilled. Nine ships from de Vaudreuil's squadron came to his aid.

The British fleet bore down on this small group. In succession Rodney's ships isolated the other three ships. César, which was soon totally dismasted and in flames, was captured by Centaur. Soon after 5:00 pm, Hector, having been flanked by Canada and Alcide, soon became a completely dismasted wreck. Following the mortal wounding of his captain, De la Vicomte, his first lieutenant De Beaumanoir, lowered the ship's flag and surrendered to Alcide.

Bougainville, who commanded Auguste, had ordered eight ships of his own division to aid Ville de Paris, but only Ardent had proceeded. Her isolation caused her to be flanked by Belliqueux and Prince William, soon leading to her capture.

At 5:30 pm de Grasse's Ville de Paris stood practically alone and had Barfleur in close pursuit, with Formidable close behind. Five ships from de Vaudreuil's squadron were trying to protect her, but none in close formation. These were Triomphant (de Vaudreuil's flagship), Bourgogne (under De La Charette), Magnifique (Macarty Macteigue), Pluton (De Rions), and Marseillais (De Castellane-Majastre). Three ships from de Grasse's squadron also still remained: Languedoc, Couronne and Sceptre.

De Grasse's closest protector, Couronne, moved away at the approach of Canada, who began the final attack on Ville de Paris. With little support and suffering huge losses in men, de Grasse made another attempt to signal the fleet and gave the order "to build the line on the starboard tack," but again this was not done. By this time, most of the French fleet, apart from those ships that were surrounded, had retreated.

=== End of the battle ===
Canada swept past Ville de Paris, doing damage to the spars and slowing her further. HMS Russell under Captain Saumarez then moved diagonally along the stern of the flagship and fired a broadside that ripped the entire length of the ship. Russell then moved to the leeward side to hamper the ship's retreat, whilst Barfleur moved onto the opposite side. Languedoc attempted to approach and give aid but was beaten back by Duke.

Ville de Paris was in desperate condition, with all masts damaged, the rudder shot away, and at least 300 men dead or injured in the cockpit. Around 6:00 pm, overwhelmed and suffering terrible losses, Ville de Paris eventually struck her colours, signaling surrender. Hood approached on Barfleur, which de Grasse had indicated was his preferred method of surrender, to receive the French surrender.

The boarding crew, which included the British fleet surgeon Gilbert Blane, were horrified at the carnage. (Note: Blane noted, "When boarded, Ville de Paris presented a scene of complete horror. The numbers killed were so great that the surviving, either from want of leisure, or through dismay, had not thrown the bodies of the killed overboard, so that the decks were covered with the blood and mangled limbs of the dead, as well as the wounded and dying.") De Grasse appeared not to have a scratch on him, whilst every one of his officers had either been killed or wounded; only three men were unwounded. Rodney boarded soon after, and Hood presented de Grasse to him. With his surrender, the battle had effectively ended, except for a few long-range desultory shots and the retreat of many of the French ships in disorder. The gallantry of William Cornwallis of Canada (younger brother of Charles Cornwallis) gained the admiration of the whole fleet. One officer noted that he was "like Hector, as if emulous to revenge his brothers cause."

The Marquis de Vaudreuil, seeing de Grasse's fate through his telescope, took command of the remaining scattered French naval fleet. On 13 April he had 10 ships with him and sailed toward Cap-Français. Rodney signaled his fleet not to pursue the remaining ships. The battle was thus over.

Later that night around 9:00 pm, fire broke out on César, begun by the entrapped French crew on the lower decks, who had broken into the liquor stores. By 10:30 pm the fire was out of control and the magazine exploded, killing more than 400 French and 58 British sailors, plus the lieutenant in charge, all from Centaur. Many men jumped overboard trying to avoid the conflagration, only to fall victim to the sharks below. Captain Marigny, who had been confined to his cabin, was one of the many killed, and none of the British prize crew survived.

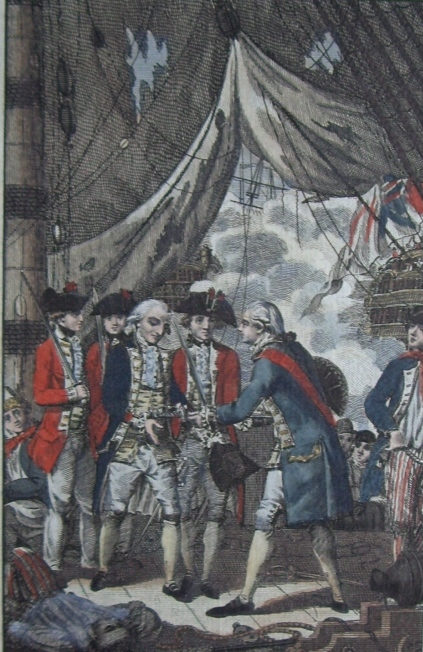
1785 engraving of de Grasse surrendering to Rodney

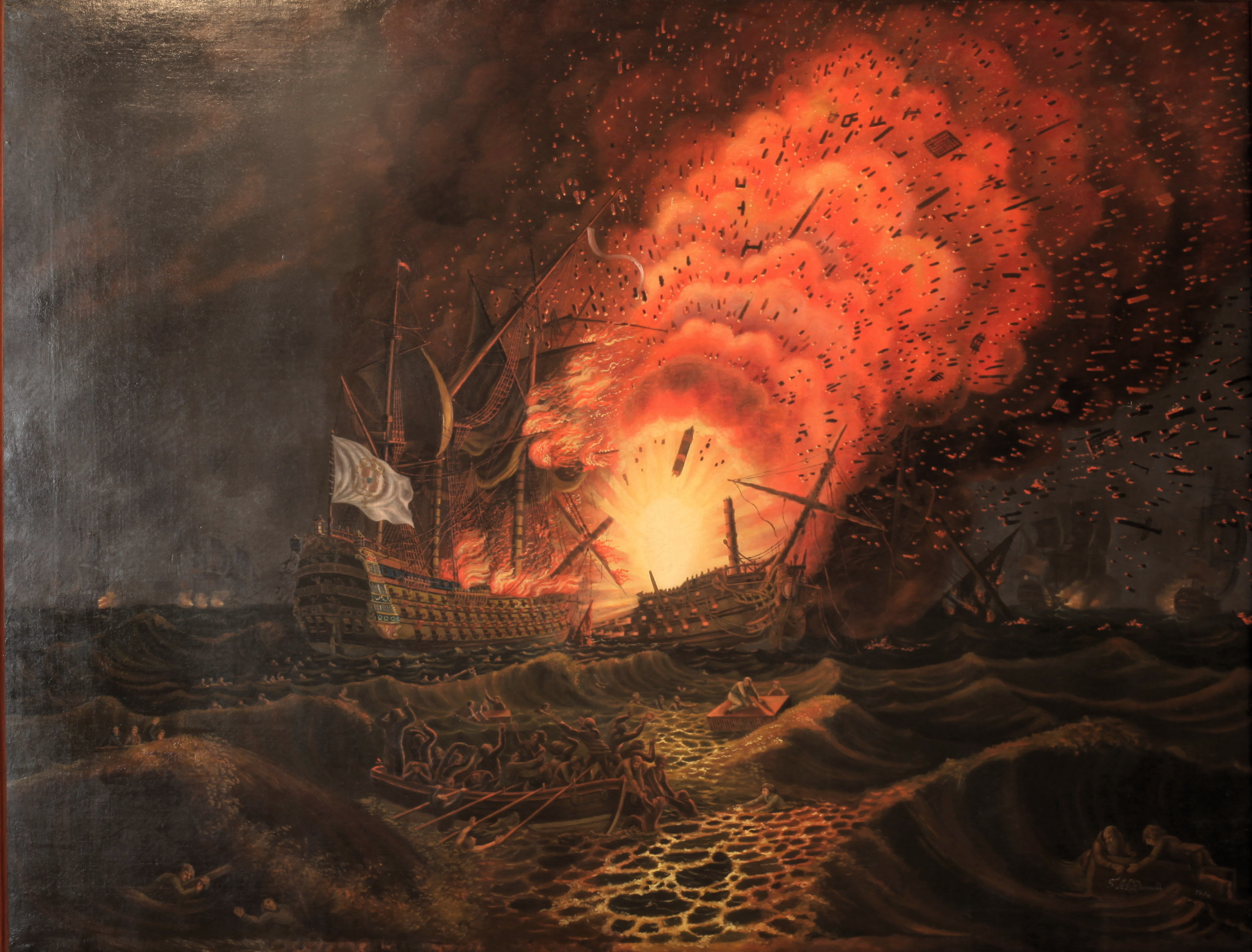
The End of the César by François Aimé Louis Dumoulin

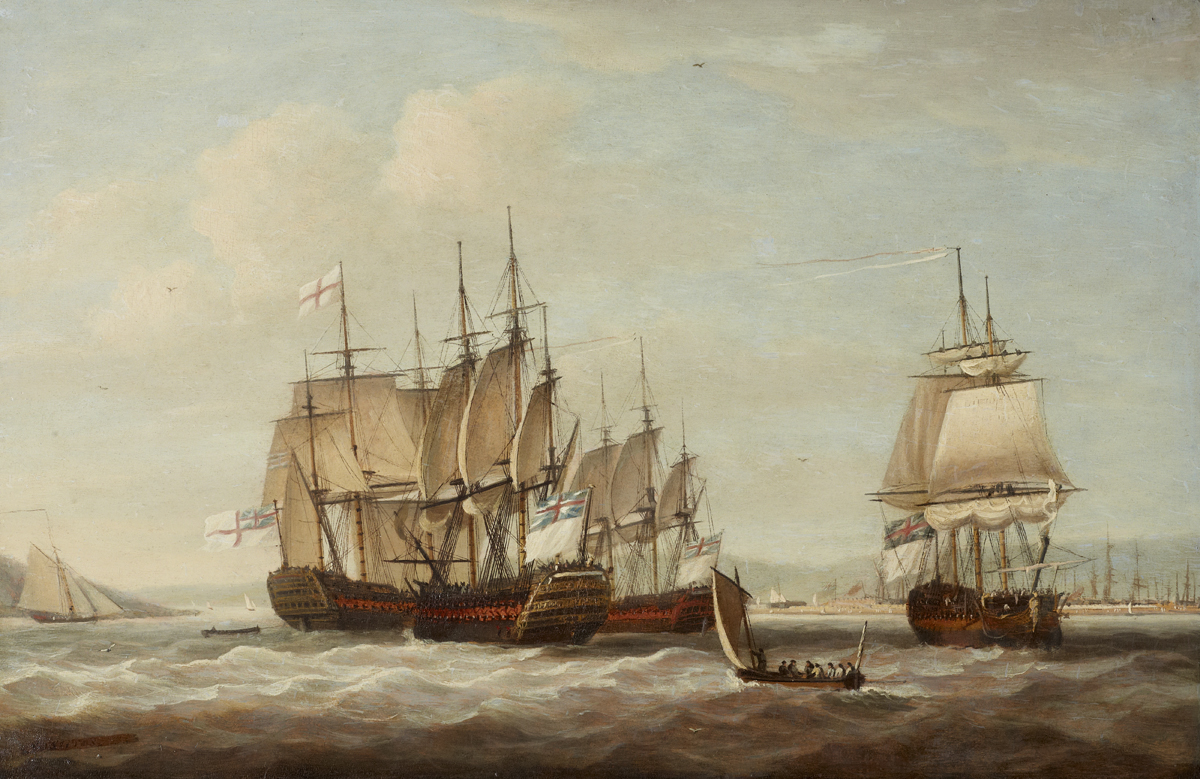
Captured French ships after the battle by Dominic Serres

== Casualties ==
The British lost 243 killed and 816 wounded, and two captains out of 36 were killed, whilst no ships were lost. The highest casualties were on Duke, with 73 killed or wounded, including the death of Lieutenant Rowland de Cerjat. The total French casualties have never been stated, but six captains out of 30 were killed. In terms of soldiers and sailors, estimates range from 3,000 killed or wounded and 5,000 to 6,000 captured, to as many as around 3,000 dead and 6,000 wounded. In addition to several French ships captured, others were severely damaged. The high number of casualties demonstrates the considerable force the French committed to achieve the invasion of Jamaica. Of Ville de Paris's crew alone, over 400 were killed and more than 700 were wounded—more than the casualties of the entire British fleet. De Grasse—the first French admiral in history to be captured by an enemy—was sent to England, where he was paroled.

== Aftermath ==
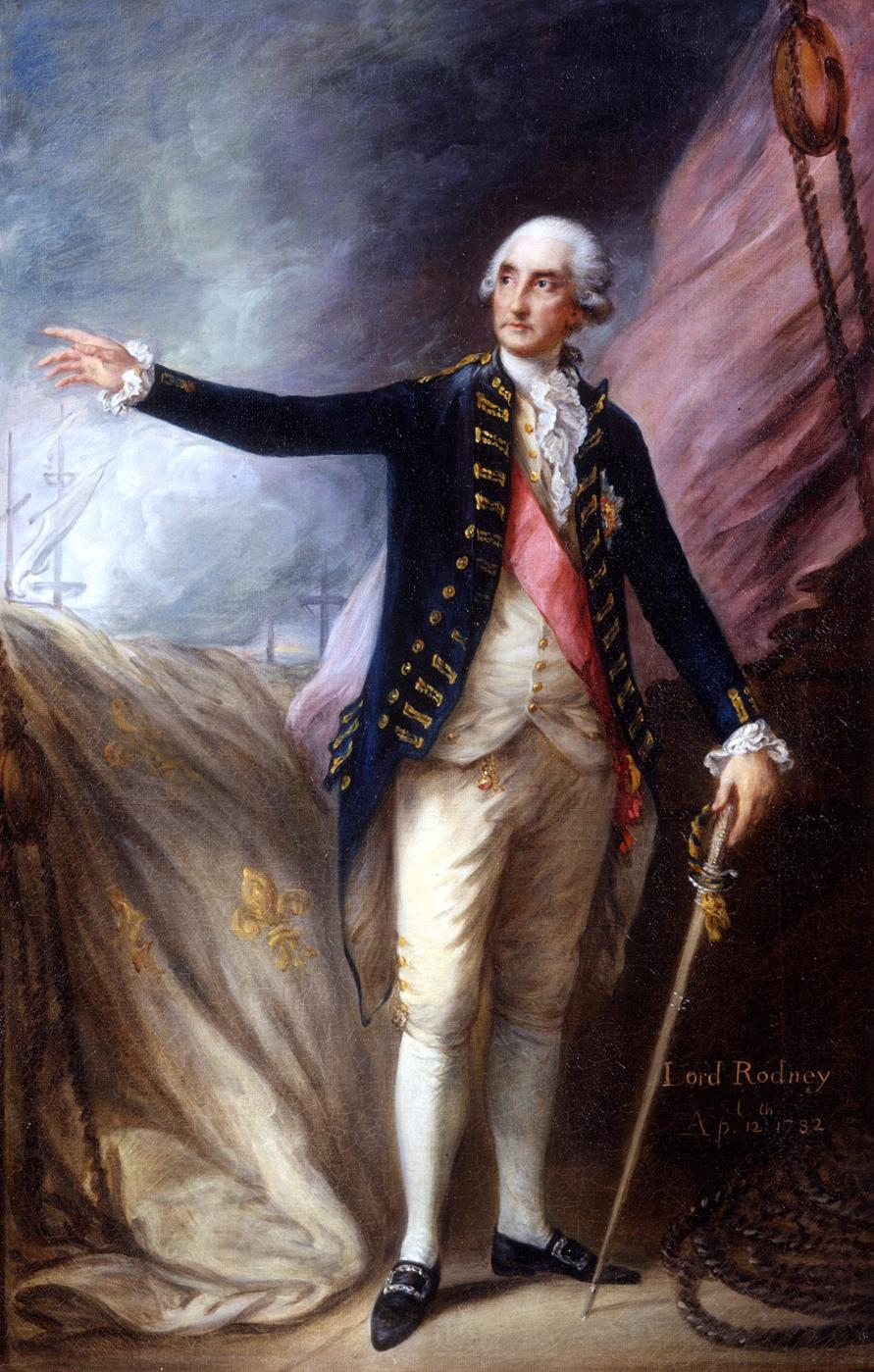
1783 painting of Rodney depicted on Ville de Paris's deck

Rodney's failure to follow up the victory by a pursuit was criticised. Hood said that the 20 French ships would have been captured had Rodney maintained the chase. In 1899 the Navy Records Society published the Dispatches and Letters Relating to the Blockading of Brest. In the introduction, they include a small biography of William Cornwallis. A poem purportedly written by him includes the lines:

Had a chief worthy Britain commanded our fleet,
Twenty-five good French ships had been laid at our feet.

On 17 April Hood was sent in pursuit of the French, and promptly captured two 64-gun ships of the line (Jason and Caton) and two smaller warships in the Battle of the Mona Passage on 19 April. Following this victory, Hood rendezvoused with Rodney at Port Royal on 29 April. As a result of the damage the fleet had sustained in battle, repairs took nine weeks.

Soon after the defeat, the French fleet reached Cap-François in several waves. The main contingent, under de Vaudreuil, arrived on 25 April. Marseillais, along with Hercule, Pluton and Éveillé, arrived on 11 May. In May all 26 French ships from the battle arrived from Martinique and were soon joined by 12 Spanish ships. Disease struck the French forces, in particular the soldiers, of whom thousands died. The allies' hesitation and indecision soon led them to abandon plans to attack Jamaica. Instead the French and Spanish focused on protecting their own territories. Jamaica remained a British colony, as indeed did Barbados and Antigua.

Disaster struck the British months after the battle when Admiral Graves was leading a fleet back to England that included the French prizes from the battle. The fleet encountered the 1782 Central Atlantic hurricane in September, which hit off Newfoundland. Glorieux, Hector and Ville de Paris, along with other ships, foundered or sank with heavy loss of life.

=== Reactions ===
News of the battle reached France in June and was met with despair. The defeat along with the loss of Ville de Paris was a devastating blow to French king Louis XVI. The navy minister, the Marquis de Castries, greeted the news as "a grim disaster". The Comte de Vergennes felt undermined in the confidence of the French navy. All blame lay on the Comte de Grasse, whilst he himself sought long to clear his name. He blamed his subordinates de Vaudreuil and Bougainville for the defeat, but an infuriated Louis bluntly told de Grasse to retire.

The battle had repercussions for France's finances: the monetary loss was huge. On Ville de Paris alone, 36 chests of money worth at least £500,000 were found, this being payment for the troops. During the first four years of the war, the French navy had lost four ships of the line (three of them to accidents), whereas during 1782 it would lose 15 ships of the line, nearly half of these in April alone. The losses of these ships were significant. Nevertheless, Louis promised to build more ships after new taxes were levied. The French finance minister, Jean-François Joly de Fleury, successfully secured the addition of a Vingtième income tax, the third and last one of its kind in the ancien régime.

There was widespread celebration in Britain upon news of the victory. In the newspaper Cumberland Pacquet it was noted, "A joy unknown for years past seemed to spread itself amongst all ranks of people." The Irish poet Eoghan Rua Ó Súilleabháin who fought at the battle composed the song Rodney's Glory which was sung throughout the London parks although it was renamed Rodney Forever. On his return Rodney was fêted as a hero, and a number of cartoons and caricatures were created to commemorate the victory. He presented the Comte de Grasse personally to King George III as a prisoner, and was created a peer with £2,000 a year settled on the title in perpetuity. A number of paintings were commissioned to celebrate his victory, notably by Thomas Gainsborough and Joshua Reynolds. Hood was also elevated to the peerage, whilst Drake and Affleck were made baronets.

=== Impact on peace negotiations ===
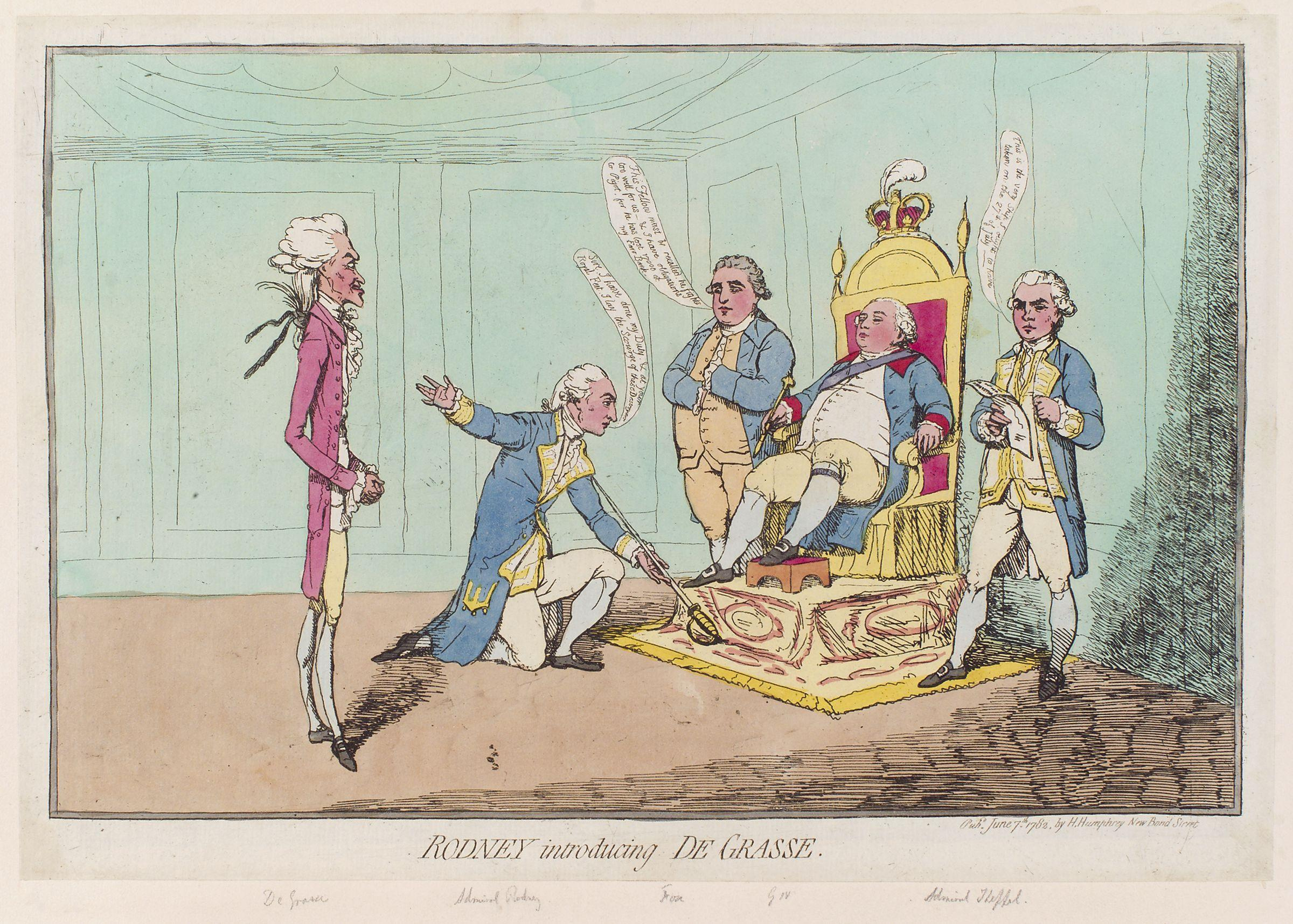
Caricature of Rodney presenting de Grasse to George III

Following the Franco-American victory at Yorktown six months earlier and the change of government in England, peace negotiations in Paris had begun among Britain, the American colonies, France, and Spain in early 1782. The battle had a significant effect on those talks when news arrived of its outcome in June. The result of the Battle of the Saintes transferred the strategic initiative to the British, whose dominance at sea was reasserted. News of the defeat reached the Americans, who soon realised they were unlikely to have much French support in the future. American General Nathanael Greene had high hopes of French assistance in the recapture of Charleston, but the defeat led to its abandonment.

No longer humbled, the British stiffened their resolve: they objected to American claims on the Newfoundland fisheries and Canada. As a result, the American negotiators led by John Jay became more amenable. Not only did they drop their minimum demands and insist on the single precondition of recognition of their independence, they also put forward America's abandonment of its commitment to make no separate peace treaty without the French. The victory at the Saintes thus signaled a collapse in the Franco-American alliance. Despite this the battle did not affect the overall outcome of the American Revolution.

De Castries urged Spain to join the French to send another armada against the British West Indies. On the theory of this victory, it would win bargaining power to force Britain's acceptance of American independence. Vergennes, however, was desperate for peace, and time was running out. France was approaching the limits of its ability to borrow money, foreshadowing the French Revolution.

France had also promised not to make peace with Britain until Spain had achieved its principal goal of conquering Gibraltar. By October this attempt had been defeated: a huge Spanish attempt in September was repelled with heavy losses, following which Richard Howe, with a large naval convoy, then relieved the garrison. As a result, Vergennes demanded that Spain give up its claim on Gibraltar to make peace, to which the Spanish acquiesced.

The Comte de Grasse, who was a high-profile prisoner in Britain, was used to exchange messages of peace between Great Britain and France. A preliminary peace treaty between Great Britain and the United States was signed on 30 November 1782. Thus, with the Americans split from their allies, peace was signed with France and Spain in January 1783. Initial articles of peace were signed in July, following by a full treaty in September 1783. Owing to their military successes in 1782, the peace treaties that brought the war to an end were less disadvantageous for Britain than had been anticipated.

=== Impact on naval tactics ===
Superior British seamanship and gunnery ruled the day in what is considered the greatest naval victory for the British over the French during the American Revolutionary War.

The battle is famous for the innovative British tactic of "breaking the line," in which the British ships passed through a gap in the French line, engaging the enemy from leeward and throwing them into disorder. Historians disagree about whether the tactic was intentional or made possible by weather. If intentional, who should receive credit is ambiguous: Rodney, (Note: According to dramatist Richard Cumberland, Rodney discussed breaking the line over dinner at Lord George Germain's country residence at Stoneland. He used cherry stones to represent two battle lines and "declared to pierce the enemy's fleet".) his Scottish Captain-of-the-Fleet and aide-de-camp, Sir Charles Douglas, (Note: Charles Dashwood, a 17-year-old aide-de-camp to both men, wrote, "Sir Charles was [heading to Sir George's cabin when he] met with Rodney, who was coming from the cabin ... Sir Charles bowed and said: 'Sir George, I give you the joy of victory!' 'Poh!' said Rodney 'the day is not half won yet.' 'Break the line, Sir George!' said your father, 'the day is your own, and I shall insure you the victory.' 'No' said the Admiral, 'I will not break my line.' After another request and refusal, Sir Charles ordered the helmsman to put to port; Sir Rodney countermanded the order and said, 'starboard.' He then said, 'Remember, Sir Charles that I am Commander-in-Chief—starboard, sir (to the helmsman).' A couple of minutes later, Sir Charles addressed him again—'only break the line Sir George, and the day is your own.' Rodney then said, 'Well, well, do as you like,' turned around, and walked into the aft cabin. I was then ordered below to give necessary directions for opening the fire on the larboard side. On my return to the quarterdeck (from below), I found the Formidable passing between two French ships, each nearly touching us".) or John Clerk of Eldin.

As a result of the battle, British naval tactics changed. The old method had involved the attacking fleet spreading itself along the entire enemy line. In the five formal fleet actions involving the Royal Navy between the Battle of the Saintes and the Battle of Trafalgar, all were victories for the British and achieved by the creation of localised numerical superiority.

== Monuments ==
A huge ornate monument to the three captains lost in the battle—William Blair, William Bayne and Robert Manners—was erected to their memory in Westminster Abbey. The 25-foot-high (7.6 m) marble monument by Joseph Nollekens was completed in 1793. It consists of a figure of Fame standing on a column which has relief portraits of the captains attached, above figures of Britannia and a lion opposite figures of Neptune and a sea horse.

A monument in Spanish Town, Jamaica, was created by the sculptor John Bacon in 1801 to honour Rodney's role in the battle. Two of the Ville de Paris guns flank Rodney's statue.

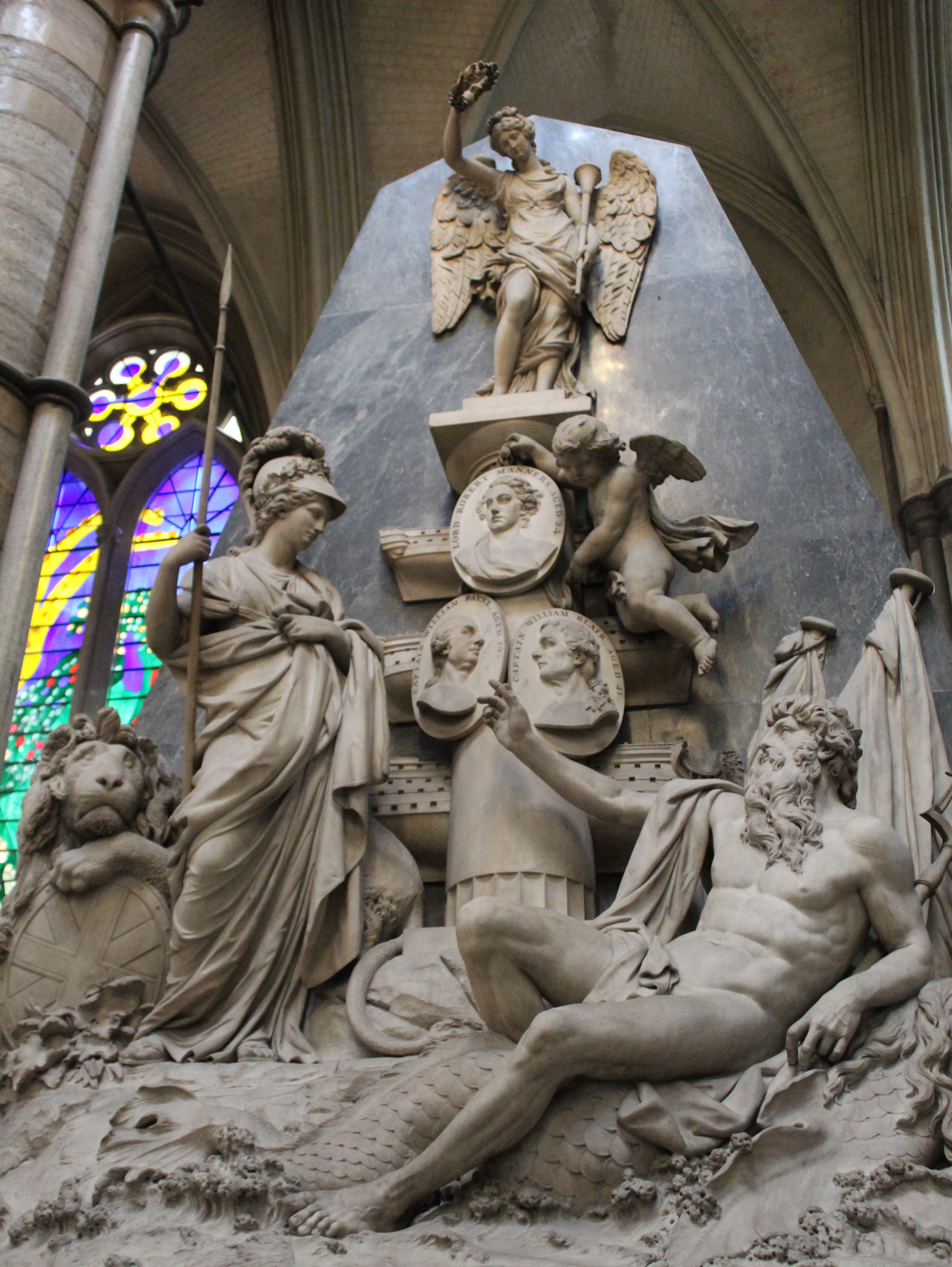
The Three Captains monument, Westminster Abbey

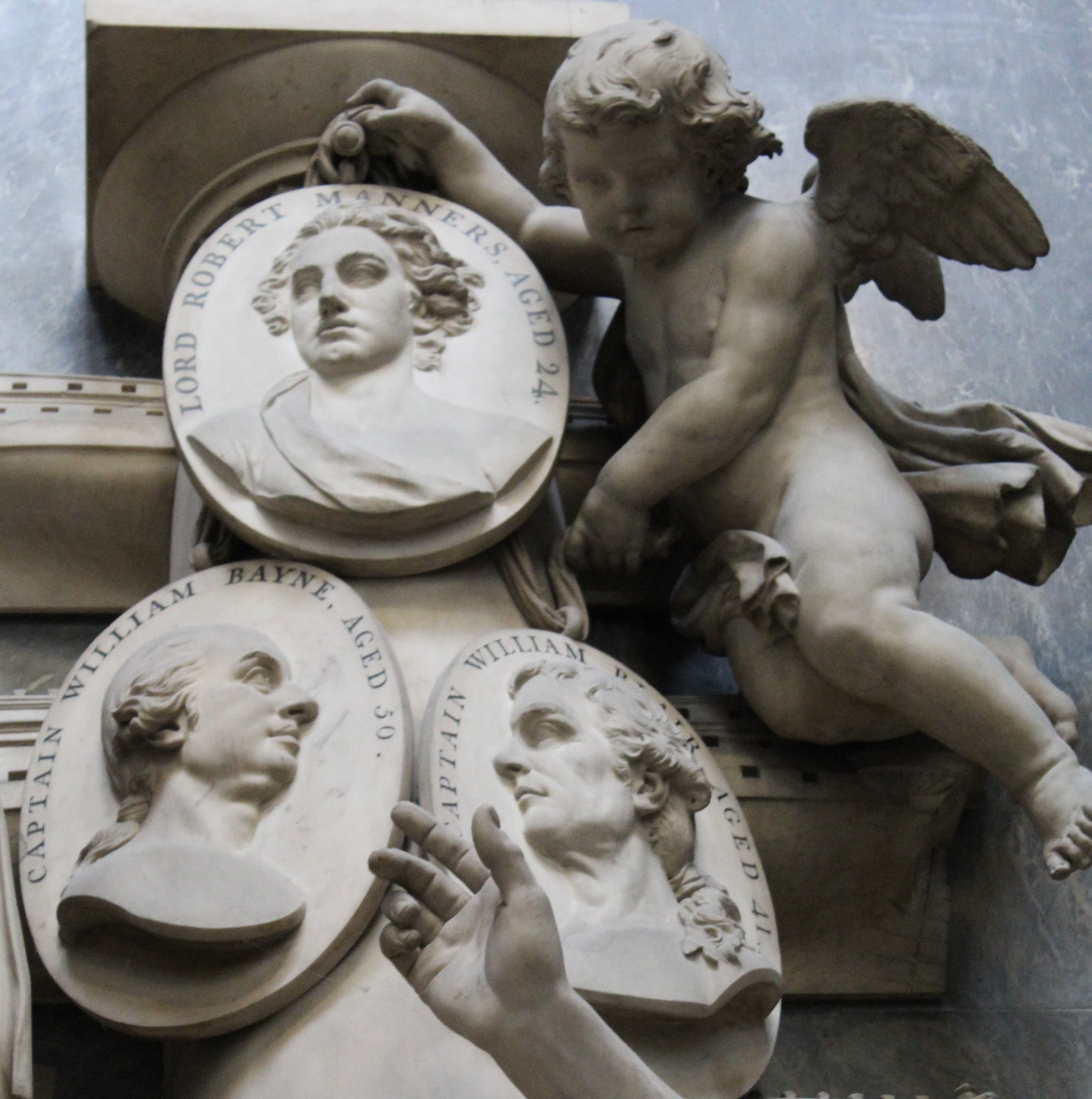
Detail of the Three Captains monument, Westminster Abbey

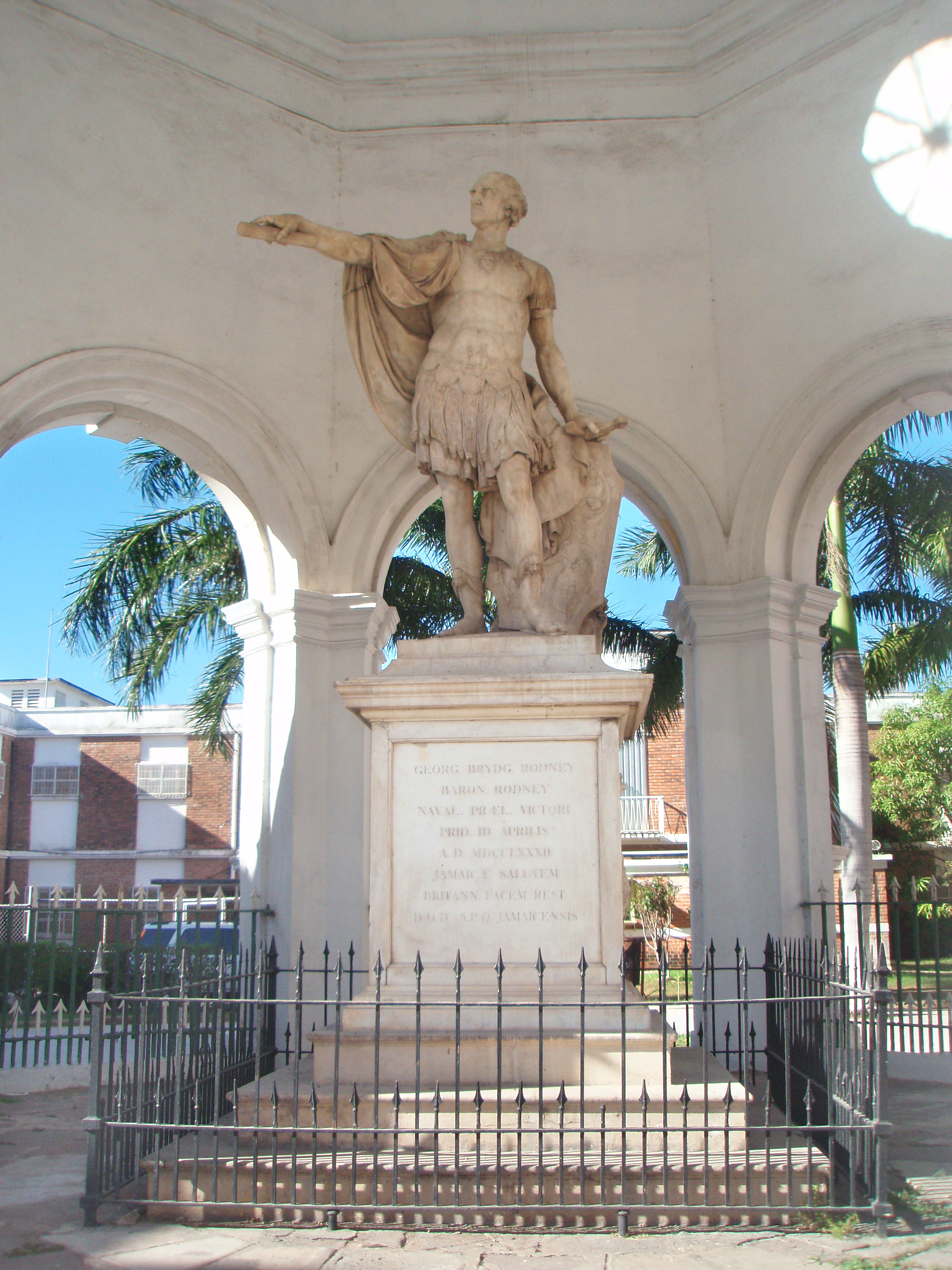
Rodney monument in Spanish Town, Jamaica

== Order of battle ==
=== Britain ===
Admiral Sir George Rodney's fleet
Van
Ship	Rate	Guns	Commander	Casualties			Notes
Ship	Rate	Guns	Commander	Killed	Wounded	Total	Notes
HMS Royal Oak	Third rate	74	Captain Thomas Burnett	8	30	38	
HMS Alfred	Third rate	74	Captain William Bayne †	12	40	52	Bayne killed on 9 April
HMS Montagu	Third rate	74	Captain George Bowen	14	29	43	
HMS Yarmouth	Third rate	64	Captain Anthony Parrey	14	33	47	
HMS Valiant	Third rate	74	Captain Samuel Granston Goodall	10	28	38	
HMS Barfleur	Second rate	98	Rear-Admiral of the Blue Sir Samuel Hood; Captain John Knight	10	37	47	Flagship of van
HMS Monarch	Third rate	74	Captain Francis Reynolds	16	33	49	
HMS Warrior	Third rate	74	Captain Sir James Wallace	5	21	26	
HMS Belliqueux	Third rate	64	Captain Andrew Sutherland	4	10	14	
HMS Centaur	Third rate	74	Captain John Nicholson Inglefield	?	?	?	No casualty returns made
HMS Magnificent	Third rate	74	Captain Robert Linzee	6	11	17	
HMS Prince William	Third rate	64	Captain George Wilkinson	0	0	0	
Centre
HMS Bedford	Third rate	74	Commodore Edmund Affleck; Captain Thomas Graves	0	17	17	
HMS Ajax	Third rate	74	Captain Nicholas Charrington	9	40	49	
HMS Repulse	Third rate	64	Captain Thomas Dumaresq	3	11	14	
HMS Canada	Third rate	74	Captain William Cornwallis	12	23	35	
HMS St Albans	Third rate	64	Captain Charles Inglis	0	6	6	
HMS Namur	Second rate	90	Captain Robert Fanshawe	6	25	31	
HMS Formidable	Second rate	98	Admiral Sir George Rodney; Captain Sir Charles Douglas (first captain); Captain John Symons (second captain)	15	39	53	Flagship of centre
HMS Duke	Second rate	98	Captain Alan Gardner	13	60	73	
HMS Agamemnon	Third rate	64	Captain Benjamin Caldwell	15	23	38	
HMS Resolution	Third rate	74	Captain Lord Robert Manners	4	34	38	
HMS Prothee	Third rate	64	Captain Charles Buckner	5	25	30	
HMS Hercules	Third rate	74	Captain Henry Savage	6	19	25	Captain Savage wounded
HMS America	Third rate	64	Captain Samuel Thompson	1	1	2	
Rear
HMS Russell	Third rate	74	Captain James Saumarez	10	29	39	
HMS Fame	Third rate	74	Captain Robert Barbor	3	12	15	
HMS Anson	Third rate	64	Captain William Blair †	3	13	16	
HMS Torbay	Third rate	74	Captain John Lewis Gidoin	10	25	35	
HMS Prince George	Second rate	98	Captain James Williams	9	24	33	
HMS Princessa	Third rate	70	Rear Admiral Francis Samuel Drake; Captain Charles Knatchbull	3	22	25	Flagship of rear
HMS Conqueror	Third rate	74	Captain George Balfour	7	23	30	
HMS Nonsuch	Third rate	64	Captain William Truscott	3	3	6	
HMS Alcide	Third rate	74	Captain Charles Thompson	?	?	?	No casualty returns made
HMS Arrogant	Third rate	74	Captain Samuel Pitchford Cornish	0	0	0	
HMS Marlborough	Third rate	74	Captain Taylor Penny	3	16	19	
Not in line
HMS Endymion	Fifth rate	44	Captain Edward Smith				
HMS Flora	Fifth rate	36	Captain Samuel Marshall				
HMS Alarm	Fifth rate	32	Captain Charles Cotton				
HMS Andromache	Fifth rate	32	Captain George Anson Byron				
HMS Sibyl	Sixth rate	28	Captain John Rodney				
HMS Triton	Sixth rate	28	Captain John M'Lawrin				
HMS Champion	Sixth rate	24	Captain Alexander Hood				
HMS Eurydice	Sixth rate	24	Captain George Wilson				
HMS Alert	Cutter	14	Commander James Vashon				
Total recorded casualties: 239 killed, 762 wounded (casualties for two ships unknown)

=== France ===
Admiral de Grasse's fleet
Division	Ship	Guns	Commander	Casualties			Notes
Division	Ship	Guns	Commander	Killed	Wounded	Total	Notes
Escadre bleue (Chef d'Escadre de Bougainville)
3rd Division	Hercule	74	Chadeau de la Clocheterie †				First officer Poulpiquet de Coatlès assumed command
3rd Division	Neptune	74	Renaud d'Aleins				
3rd Division	Souverain	74	Glandevès du Castellet				
3rd Division	Palmier	74	Martelly-Chautard				
1st Division	Northumberland	74	Antoine Cresp †				First officer Le Saige de La Mettrie killed. Ensign Gombaud de Roquebrune assumed command.
1st Division	Auguste	80	Bougainville (Chef d'escadre); Castellan (flag captain)				
1st Division	Ardent	64	Gouzillon (WIA)				Captured
2nd Division	Scipion	74	Clavel				
2nd Division	Brave	74	Renart d'Amblimont				
2nd Division	Citoyen	74	Thy (WIA)				
Escadre blanche (Lieutenant-Général de Grasse)
3rd Division	Hector	74	Chauchouart de Lavicomté †				Captured. First officer de Beaumanoir assumed command.
3rd Division	César	74	Bernard de Marigny †				Captured but destroyed. First officer Laub assumed command.
3rd Division	Dauphin Royal	70	Roquefeuil-Montpéroux				
1st Division	Languedoc	80	Arros d'Argelos				
1st Division	Ville de Paris	104	Grasse (Lieutenant général); Pierre de Vaugiraud (Major general) (WIA); Lavilléon (flag captain)				Captured
1st Division	Couronne	74	Mithon de Genouilly				
2nd Division	Éveillé	64	Le Gardeur de Tilly				
2nd Division	Sceptre	74	Louis de Rigaud de Vaudreuil				Malet de Puyvallier served aboard.
2nd Division	Glorieux	74	Pérusse des Cars †				Captured. Lieutenant Trogoff de Kerlessy assumed command.
Escadre blanche et bleue (Chef d'Escadre d'Espinouse)
3rd Division	Diadème	74	Monteclerc				
3rd Division	Destin	74	Dumaitz de Goimpy				
3rd Division	Magnanime	74	Le Bègue de Germiny (WIA)				
3rd Division	Réfléchi	64	Médine				
1st Division	Conquérant	74	La Grandière				
1st Division	Magnifique	74	Macarty Macteigue				
1st Division	Triomphant	80	Marquis de Vaudreuil (chef d'escadre); Cheyron du Pavillon (flag captain) (DOW)				
1st Division	Bourgogne	74	Charitte				
2nd Division	Duc de Bourgogne	80	Champmartin (flag captain) (WIA); Coriolis d'Espinouse (chef d'escadre)				
2nd Division	Marseillais	74	Castellane Majastre				
2nd Division	Pluton	74	Albert de Rions				

Not in line: Frigates Richemont (Mortemart); Amazone (Ensign Bourgarel de Martignan, acting captain replacing Montguyot); Aimable (Lieutenant de Suzannet); Galathée (Lieutenant de Roquart); corvette Cérès (Lieutenant de Paroy); and cutter Clairvoyant (Ensign de Daché); cutter Pandour (Grasse-Limermont).

== In popular culture ==
The battle is the subject of the title track on No Grave But the Sea, the 2017 album by the Scottish "pirate metal" band Alestorm. The lyrics mention de Grasse, the British ships Duke and Bedford, and the tactic of "breaking the line."

The battle was the climax of the first written Richard Bolitho novel To Glory We Steer by Alexander Kent.

The battle is featured in Le Dernier Panache, a show in the Puy du Fou, wherein the show's main character, François de Charette, fights in the Battle of the Saintes. In the show and in reality he fought the battle as a lieutenant de vaisseau.

In the verse epic Omeros by Nobel-prize-winning poet Derek Walcott, which is set largely on St. Lucia, the retired British officer Major Plunkett is researching the battle. Two chapters tell the story of his namesake Midshipman Plunkett, who dies in the battle.

== Bibliography ==
- Allison, David K; Ferreiro, Larrie D, eds. (2018). The American Revolution: A World War. Smithsonian Institution. ISBN 9781588346599.
- Barnes, Ian (2014). The Historical Atlas of the American Revolution. Routledge. ISBN 9781136752711.
- Black, Jeremy (1999). Warfare in the Eighteenth Century. London: Cassell. ISBN 978-0-304-35245-6.
- Buchanan, John (2019). The Road to Charleston: Nathanael Greene and the American Revolution. University of Virginia Press. ISBN 9780813942254.
- Contenson, Ludovic (1934). La Société des Cincinnati de France et la guerre d'Amérique (1778–1783). Paris: éditions Auguste Picard. OCLC 7842336.
- Douglas, Major-General Sir Howard; Valin, Christopher J (2010). Naval Evolutions: A Memoir. Fireship Press. ISBN 978-1-935585-27-5.
- Duffy, Michael; Mackay, Ruddock F (2009). Hawke, Nelson and British Naval Leadership, 1747–1805. Boydell Press. ISBN 9781843834991.
- Dull, Jonathan R (1975). The French Navy and American Independence: A Study of Arms and Diplomacy, 1774–1787. Princeton University Press. ISBN 9780691069203.
- Dull, Jonathan R (2009). The Age of the Ship of the Line: The British & French Navies, 1650–1815. Seaforth Publishing. ISBN 9781473811669.
- Fraser, Edward (1904). Famous Fighters of the Fleet: Glimpses Through the Cannon Smoke in the Days of the Old Navy. Kessinger Publishing.
- Fullom, Stephen Watson (1865). Life of General Sir Howard Douglas, Bart. J. Murray.
- Gardiner, Asa Bird (1905). The order of the Cincinnati in France. The Rhode Island state society of Cincinnati. OCLC 5104049.
- Gardiner, Robert (1996). Navies and the American Revolution 1775–1783. Naval Institute Press. ISBN 9781557506238.
- Greene, Jack P; Pole, J R, eds. (2008). A Companion to the American Revolution. John Wiley & Sons. ISBN 9780470756447.
- Greene, Jerome (2005). The Guns of Independence: The Siege of Yorktown, 1781. Savas Beatie. ISBN 9781611210057.
- Guérin, Léon (1863). Histoire maritime de France (in French). Vol. 5. Dufour et Mulat.
- Hardman, John (2016). The Life of Louis XVI. Yale University Press. ISBN 9780300220421.
- Harvey, Robert (2004). A Few Bloody Noses: The American Revolutionary War. Robinson. ISBN 9781841199528.
- Jaques, Tony (2007). Dictionary of Battles and Sieges: A Guide to 8500 Battles from Antiquity Through the Twenty-first Century. Miegunyiah Press. ISBN 9780522853360.
- Lacour-Gayet, Georges (1905). La marine militaire de la France sous le règne de Louis XVI. Paris: Honoré Champion. OCLC 763372623.
- Lavery, Brian (2009). Empire of the seas: how the navy forged the modern world. Conway. ISBN 9781844861095.
- Mahan, Alfred Thayer (2020). The Major Operations of the Navies in the War of American Independence. Courier Dover Publications. ISBN 9780486842103.
- Marley, David (1998). Wars of the Americas: A Chronology of Armed Conflict in the New World, 1492 to the Present. ABC-CLIO. ISBN 0874368375.
- Miller, Donald (2015). Lafayette: His Extraordinary Life and Legacy. iUniverse. ISBN 9781491759974.
- Naval History Division (1964). Naval Documents of the American Revolution. United States: Government Printing Office. ISBN 9781943604012.
- O'Shaughnessy, Andrew (2013). The Men Who Lost America: British Command during the Revolutionary War and the Preservation of the Empire. Oneworld Publications. ISBN 9781780742465.
- Page, Anthony (2014). Britain and the Seventy Years War, 1744–1815: Enlightenment, Revolution and Empire. Macmillan International Higher Education. ISBN 9781137474438.
- Playfair, John (1822). "On the Naval Tactics of the Late John Clerk, Esq. of Eldin." The Works of John Playfair, Vol. III
- Roche, Jean-Michel (2005). Dictionnaire des bâtiments de la flotte de guerre française de Colbert à nos jours. Vol. 1. Group Retozel-Maury Millau. ISBN 978-2-9525917-0-6. OCLC 165892922.
- Rogoziński, Jan (1999). A Brief History of the Caribbean: From the Arawak and the Carib to the Present. Facts On File. ISBN 9780816038114.
- Stevens, William (2009). History of Sea Power; Volume 95 of Historische Schiffahrt. Books on Demand. ISBN 9783861950998.
- Tombs, Isabelle; Tombs, Robert (2010). That Sweet Enemy: The British and the French from the Sun King to the Present. Random House. ISBN 9781446426234.
- Trew, Peter (2006). Rodney and the Breaking of the Line. Pen & Sword Military. ISBN 9781844151431.
- Tucker, Spencer C. (2018). American Revolution: The Definitive Encyclopedia and Document Collection. ABC-CLIO. ISBN 9781851097449.
- Tucker, Spencer C. (2011). Battles that Changed History: An Encyclopedia of World Conflict. ABC-CLIO. ISBN 978-1598844290.
- Tunstall, Brian (2001). Naval Warfare in the Age of Sail: The Evolution of Fighting Tactics, 1650–1815. Wellfleet Press. ISBN 9780785814269.
- Valin, Christopher J (2009). Fortune's Favorite: Sir Charles Douglas and the Breaking of the Line. Fireship Press. ISBN 978-1-934757-72-7.
- Vergé-Franceschi, Michel (2002). Dictionnaire d'Histoire maritime. Paris: Robert Laffont. ISBN 2-221-08751-8. OCLC 806386640.
- Wallenfeldt, Jeff, ed. (2009). The American Revolutionary War and The War of 1812: People, Politics, and Power America at War. Britannica Educational Publishing. ISBN 9781615300495.

=== Further reading ===
- Hart, Francis Russell (1922). Admirals of the Caribbean. Boston Houghton Mifflin.
