= Louis de Malet de Puyvallier =

French Navy officer of the War of American Independence

Louis de Malet de Puyvallier (Note: Sometimes spelt "Mallet".) (Saint-Martin-d'Ary, 10 June 1738 – Saint-Martin-d'Ary, 16 January 1807) was a French Navy officer. He served in the War of American Independence.

== Biography ==
Malet de Puyvallier was born to a family from Saintonge. He joined the Navy as a Garde-Marine on 16 October 1756. He was promoted to Lieutenant on 4 April 1777.

In 1778, he served as first officer on the 64-gun Vengeur, under Renart d'Amblimont. Later he served on the 80-gun Auguste.

He took part in the Battle of the Chesapeake on 5 September 1781. On 15 September 1782, he was promoted to Captain. He fought on 74-gun Sceptre at the Battle of the Saintes on 12 April 1782, (Note: Contenson erroneously says on the 80-gun Auguste, which was under Pierre-Joseph de Castellan.) where he was wounded.

He retired on 24 November 1785.

He was a member of the Society of the Cincinnati.

== Sources and references ==
Notes

Citations

References

- Contenson, Ludovic (1934). La Société des Cincinnati de France et la guerre d'Amérique (1778–1783). Paris: éditions Auguste Picard. OCLC 7842336.
- Gardiner, Asa Bird (1905). The order of the Cincinnati in France. The Rhode Island state society of Cincinnati. OCLC 5104049.
- Lacour-Gayet, Georges (1910). La marine militaire de la France sous le règne de Louis XVI. Paris: Honoré Champion.
- Morris, Robert (1988). The Papers of Robert Morris, 1781–1784. p. 479. ISBN 9780822970262.
- Troude, Onésime-Joachim (1867). Batailles navales de la France (in French). Vol. 2. Challamel ainé.
- Roche, Jean-Michel (2005). Dictionnaire des bâtiments de la flotte de guerre française de Colbert à nos jours. Vol. 1. Group Retozel-Maury Millau. ISBN 978-2-9525917-0-6. OCLC 165892922.

External links

- Archives nationales (2011). "Fonds Marine, sous-série B/4: Campagnes, 1571-1785" (PDF).
