= Woman of the World =

Woman of the World may refer to:

- A Woman of the World, 1925 silent film starring Pola Negri

== Literature ==
- The Woman of the World (1838), a novel by Catherine Gore
- A Woman of the World: Her Counsel to Other People's Sons and Daughters (1904), a novel by Ella Wheeler Wilcox

== Music ==
- Woman of the World/To Make a Man, 1969 album by Loretta Lynn
- "Woman of the World (Leave My World Alone)", song by Loretta Lynn
- "Woman of the World" (Aerosmith song), 1974
- Woman of the World (The Best of 2007–2018), compilation album by Amy Macdonald
- "Woman of the World", song by Amy Macdonald from the above album
- "Woman of the World", song by Double from the album Blue
- "Woman of the World", song by Donald Byrd from the album Street Lady
- "A Woman of the World", song by The Divine Comedy from Casanova

== See also ==
- Man of the World
- The World and Its Woman, a 1919 American silent drama film
- The World and the Woman, a 1916 American silent drama film
