= Jean-François du Cheyron du Pavillon =

French Navy officer of the War of American Independence

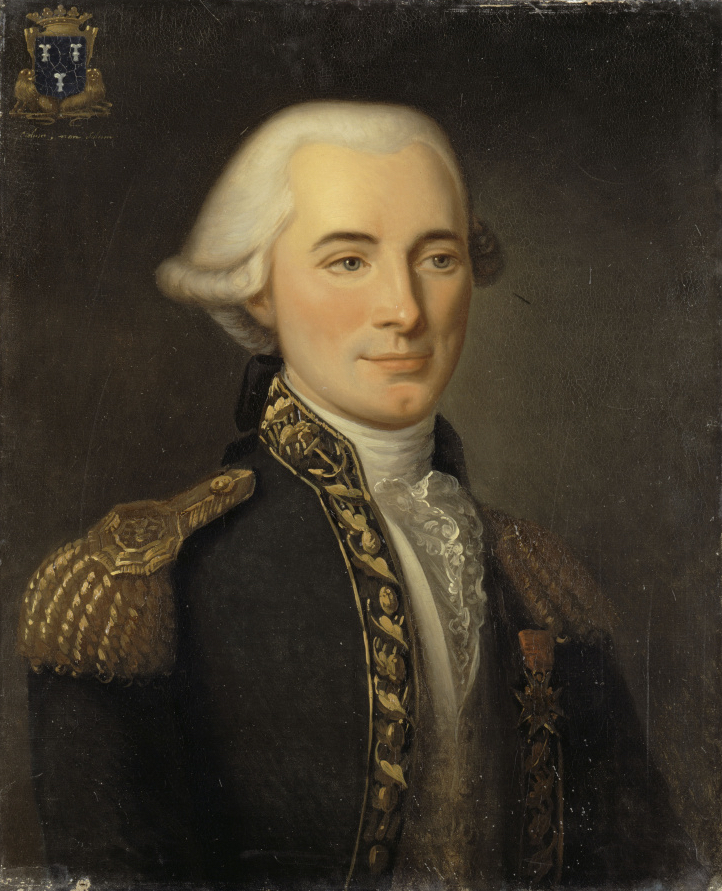
- Born: 29 September 1730; Périgueux, France
- Died: 14 April 1782 (aged 51)
- Relatives: Pierre-Joseph du Cheyron de Saint-Vincent
- Military career
- Branch: French Navy
- Rank: captain
- Conflicts: War of American Independence; Battle of Ushant; Battle of the Saintes

Jean-François du Cheyron du Pavillon (29 September 1730, in Périgueux – 14 April 1782 off Îles des Saintes) was a French Navy officer. He served in the War of American Independence. He commanded the 80-gun Triomphant at the Battle of the Saintes, and died of wound two days after the battle.

== Biography ==
Cheyron was born to a noble family, and brother to Pierre-Joseph du Cheyron de Saint-Vincent. He started his military career as a sub-lieutenant in the Régiment de Normandie en 1745, and rose to Lieutenant. In 1748, he changed his career and joined the Navy as a Garde-Marine. He was promoted to Ensign in 1754. He served under Admiral de Conflans, notably on Intrépide off Saint-Domingue in 1760, and later on Guerrier and Tonnant. He was promoted to Lieutenant in 1762.

From 1766 to 1775, Cheyron worked on naval tactics and signals, and he was made a Knight in the Order of Saint Louis in 1771. On 25 March 1773, he presented a memorandum to the Court, titled Mémoire sur la tactique navale — Signaux de nuit et pour le temps de brume pour l'escadre du Roi. The report was favourably received by the Commission. He is considered one of the principal creators of naval communications before the era of radio.

In 1775, he was brigade chief of the Gardes-Marine in Rochefort, and became major of the training squadron (escadre d'évolution) in 1776.

In 1777, he was promoted to Captain. In July 1778, Cheyron was appointed to Orvilliers' squadron, and he applied his techniques during the Battle of Ushant.

From 1779 to 1780, he served as Major in the French-Spanish fleet. Given command of the 80-gun Triomphant, he was Vaudreuil's flag captain at the Battle of the Saintes on 12 April 1782. He was mortally wounded and died on April 14.

== Citations and references ==
Citations

References

- Contenson, Ludovic (1934). La Société des Cincinnati de France et la guerre d'Amérique (1778-1783). Paris: éditions Auguste Picard. OCLC 7842336.
- Levot, Prosper (1866). Les Gloires Maritimes de la France. Notices Biographiques Sur Les Plus Célèbres Marins, Découvreurs, Astronomes, Ingénieurs, Hydrographes, Médecins, Administrateurs, Etc (in French). Bertrand.
- Morison, Eliot Samuel (1959). John Paul Jones: A Sailor's Biography. United States Naval Institute Press. OCLC 19740190.
