= French cutter Clairvoyant (1780) =

History

France
- Name: Clairvoyant
- Builder: Denys, at Dunkirk
- Laid down: April 1780
- Launched: 18 June 1780
- In service: September 1780
- Out of service: October 1784
- Fate: Wrecked 1785

General characteristics
- Class & type: Mutin-class cutter
- Tons burthen: 115 tonnes
- Length: 24.4 m (80 ft 1 in)
- Beam: 7.8 m (25 ft 7 in)
- Depth of hold: 3.8 m (12 ft 6 in)
- Propulsion: Sails
- Armament: 14 guns

Clairvoyant was a Mutin-class 14-gun cutter of the French Navy.

== Career ==
In 1781, Clairvoyant sailed with the division under Suffren up to Cap Vert. In 1782, she was reconfigured as a brig.

Clairvoyant took part in the Battle of the Saintes on 12 April 1782.

In 1785, she was wrecked at Audierne. The crew was saved.
