= Joseph Gabriel de Poulpiquet de Coatlès =

Joseph Gabriel de Poulpiquet de Coatlès (1744 — 1789) was a French Navy officer. He served in the War of American Independence.

== Biography ==
Poulpiquet de Coatlès served on the 74-gun Hercule, under La Clocheterie. He took part in the Battle of the Saintes on 12 April 1782, and took over command of Hercule when La Clocheterie was killed.

In the subsequent inquiry into the events of the battle, Poulpiquet de Coatlès was both praised and admonished for his defence of Hercule and failure to come to the rescue of Ville de Paris.

== Sources and references ==
Notes

Bibliography

- Dumarcet, Lionel (1998). François Athanase Charette de la Contrie : une histoire véritable. Paris : Le Grand livre du mois. ISBN 9782702818497. OCLC 468220116.
- Guérin, Léon (1843). Histoire maritime de France depuis la guerre de Nimègue jusqu'à nos jours (in French). Vol. 2. Abel Ledoux.
- Troude, Onésime-Joachim (1867). Batailles navales de la France (in French). Vol. 2. Challamel ainé. OCLC 836362484.
