= Man of the World =

Man of The World may refer to:

== Film and television ==
- Man of the World (film), a film by Richard Wallace, starring William Powell and Carole Lombard
- Man of the World (TV series), a 1962–1963 British drama series

== Music ==
- Man of the World (album), a 1980 album by Demis Roussos
- Man of the World, a 2010 album by Animal Liberation Orchestra
- "Man of the World" (song), a song by Peter Green
- "Man of the World", a song by Marc Cohn on the 2004 soundtrack for the film The Prince & Me

== Literature ==
- The Man of the World, a 1773 novel by Henry Mackenzie
- The Man of the World, a 1781 play by Charles Macklin
- The Man of the World; or, Vanities of the Day, an 1856 book by Stephen Watson Fullom
- The Man of the World, a 1901 novel by Antonio Fogazzaro
- A Man of the World, a 1905 book by Annie Payson Call

== Others ==
- Man of the World (pageant), an annual international male beauty pageant
