= Jean-Baptiste de Macarty Macteigue =

French Navy officer of the War of American Independence

Jean-Baptiste de Macarty Macteigue (Note: Lacour-Gayet spells "Mac-Carthy Martaigue".) was a French Navy officer. He served in the War of American Independence.

== Biography ==
Macarty Macteigue joined the Navy as a Garde-Marine in August 1754. He was promoted to Lieutenant on 13 November 1771.

In 1779, Macarty Macteigue was second officer on Fendant, flagship of Vaudreuil's division in the squadron sent as reinforcement to D'Estaing.

He was promoted to Captain on 4 April 1780. In December 1781, Macarty Macteigue was in command of the 74-gun Actif, on which he took part in the Battle of Ushant on 12 December 1781, engaging HMS Edgar.

He captained the 74-gun Magnifique at the Battle of the Saintes on 12 April 1782. Macarty was noted for closely supporting the flagship Ville de Paris, and the inquiry into the battle not only acquitted of any blame, but lauded his conduct.

On 21 December 1782, he Macarthy Macteigue became Director of constructions. On 1 May 1786, he was Chef de Division, serving as Major general of the Navy in Rochefort.
