= Portrait of Admiral Rodney =

Painting by Thomas Gainsborough

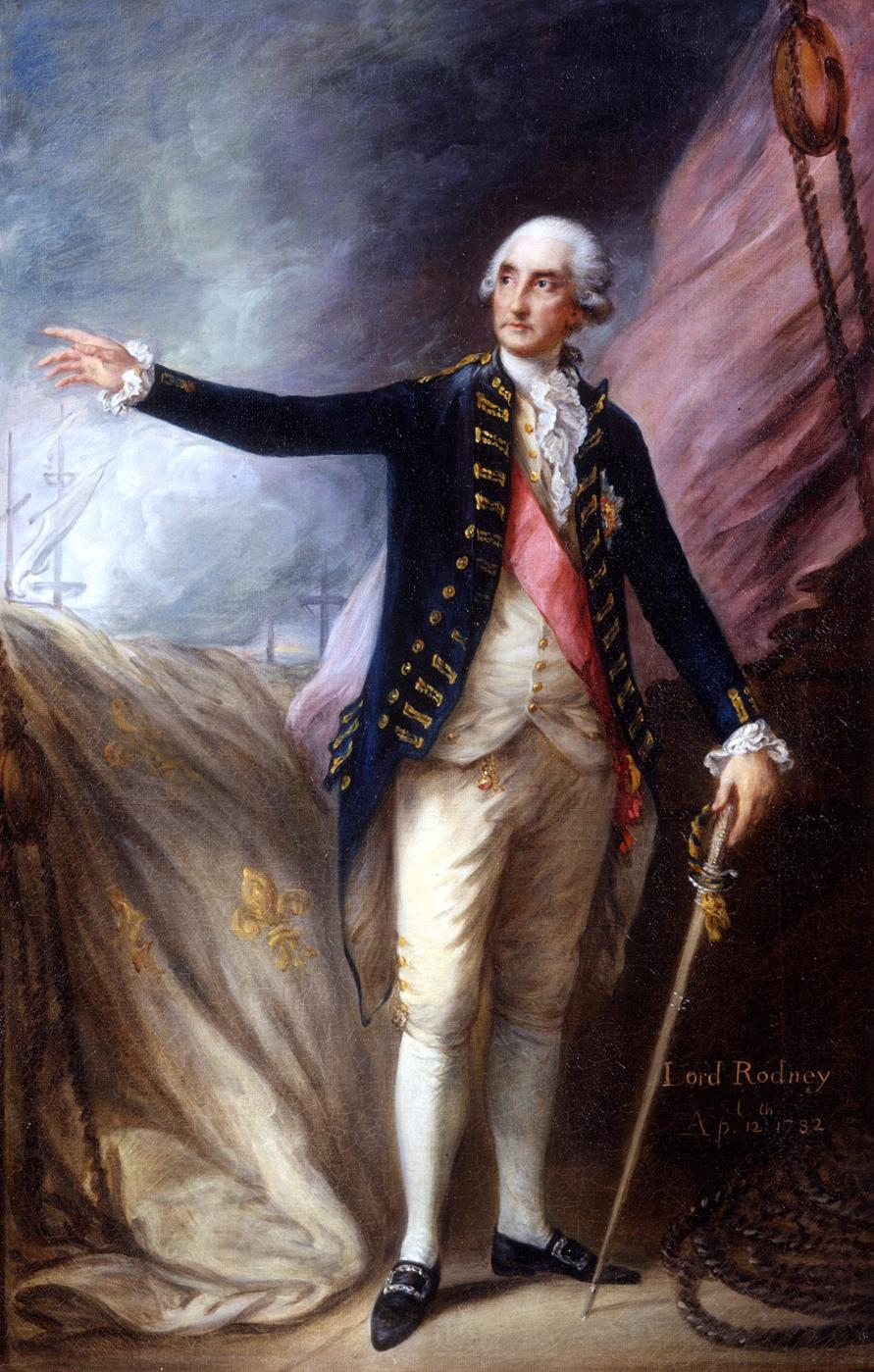
- Artist: Thomas Gainsborough
- Year: 1783
- Type: Oil on canvas, portrait painting
- Dimensions: 71 cm × 40 cm (28 in × 16 in)
- Location: Private Collection

Portrait of Admiral Rodney or Admiral Rodney at the Battle of the Saintes is an oil on canvas portrait painting by the English artist Thomas Gainsborough, from 1783. It depict the British admiral George Rodney, 1st Baron Rodney.

== History and description ==
It illustrates his April 1782 victory at the Battle of the Saintes in the Caribbean Sea during the American War of Independence. Rodney led the Royal Navy to a decisive victory over the French fleet commanded by the Comte de Grasse by "breaking the line". Rodney is shown on the deck of the de Grasse's captured flagship Ville de Paris with the ship's Fleur-de-lis ensign behind him, as smoke from the battle swirls in the background. In 1788 the artist's nephew Gainsborough Dupont produced a mezzotint based on the picture.

Rodney was also notably painted by Gainsborough's contemporary and rival, Joshua Reynolds, who exhibited his painting at the Royal Academy's Summer Exhibition in 1789. Reynolds similarly included action from the Battle of the Saintes in the background. Commissioned by the Prince of Wales, it remains today in the Royal Collection. A later copy is in the National Maritime Museum in Greenwich.

== Bibliography ==
- Corbett, Theodore. A Maritime History of the American Revolutionary War: An Atlantic-Wide Conflict over Independence and Empire. Pen and Sword Maritime, 2023.
- Grant R.G. Battle at Sea: 3000 Years of Naval Warfare. Dorling Kindersley Ltd,2010.
- Trew, Peter. Rodney and The Breaking of the Line. Leo Cooper, 2005.
- Whitley, William Thomas. Thomas Gainsborough. Smith, Elder & Company, 1915.
