= Charles de Charritte =

French Navy officer of the War of American Independence

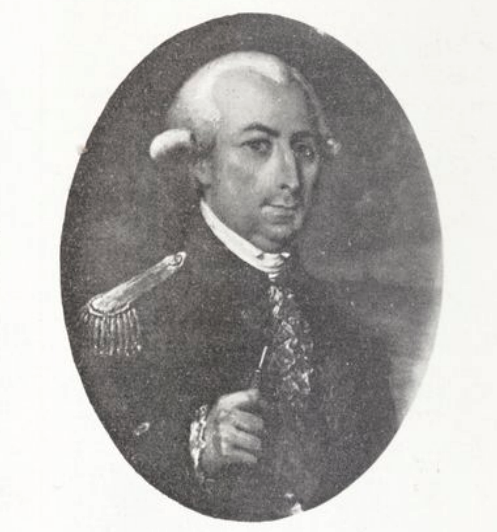
- Born: 1 November 1733; Pau, France
- Died: 20 October 1815 (aged 81)
- Allegiance: Kingdom of France; Kingdom of the French; French First Republic
- Branch: French Navy; French Navy
- Service years: 1749–1814
- Rank: Vice-admiral
- Conflicts: Seven Years' War; American Revolutionary War; Battle of the Saintes
- Awards: Order of Saint Louis

Charles de Charritte (Note: Sometimes spelt "Charitte".) (1 November 1733 in Pau – 20 October 1815 in Rennes) was a French Navy officer. He served in the War of American Independence.

== Biography ==
Charritte was born to the family of a president of the Parliament of Pau, himself a son of Jean-Pierre de Charitte. Charritte joined the Navy as Garde-Marine on 11 October 1749, and was promoted to Lieutenant on 1 May 1763.

He was promoted to Captain on 14 April 1777, with a service history at the time mentioning "17 cruises, 2 commands, 1 battle".

In 1779, he commanded the 80-gun Auguste as flag captain of Chef d'Escadre Rochechouart, who headed the 2nd Division of the White-and-Blue squadron of the fleet under Orvilliers.

In 1781, he commanded the 74-gun Bourgogne, in the Blue squadron of the fleet under De Grasse. He took part in the Battle of the Chesapeake on 5 September 1781 and in Battle of the Saintes, and was later presented a sword by the Estates of Burgundy for saving Bourgogne, which they had financed.

He served as general director of the harbour of Rochefort in 1783.

He was promoted to Chef d'Escadre on 1 November 1786 and given command of the 9th Squadron. In 1786, he cruised with the escadre d'évolution with his flag on the frigate Junon. He rose to contre-amiral on 1 January 1792.

During the French Revolution, he retired in Touraine and stayed clear of historical events, although the Directoire called him to be part of the Conseil de la Marine in Paris in 1799.

During the Bourbon Restoration, he was awarded the Grand Cross of the Order of Saint Louis, and the rank of Vice-amiral on 6 July 1814.

== Sources and references ==
Notes

Citations

Bibliography

- Contenson, Ludovic (1934). La Société des Cincinnati de France et la guerre d'Amérique (1778-1783). Paris: éditions Auguste Picard. OCLC 7842336.
- Lacour-Gayet, Georges (1910). La marine militaire de la France sous le règne de Louis XVI. Paris: Honoré Champion.
- Rabbe; Boisjoslin; Sainte-Preuve (1836). Biographie universelle et portative des contemporains (in French). Challamel ainé.
- Troude, Onésime-Joachim (1867). Batailles navales de la France (in French). Vol. 2. Challamel ainé.
