= Pierre Joseph François Samson de Champmartin =

French Navy officer of the War of American Independence

Pierre Joseph François Samson de Champmartin was a French Navy officer. He served in the War of American Independence.

== Biography ==
Champmartin was born to the family of a Navy Lieutenant from Toulon. Champmartin joined the Navy as Garde-Marine on 17 September 1751, and was promoted to Lieutenant on 1 October 1764. In 1776, he commanded the frigate Flore in Toulon.

In 1778, Champmartin was second officer on the 80-gun Tonnant, in the squadron under D'Estaing. He was promoted to Captain on 21 January 1780. In 1781 he was first officer on Marseillais, on which he was wounded during the Battle of the Chesapeake on 5 September 1781. He commanded the 80-gun Duc de Bourgogne at the Battle of the Saintes on 12 April 1782, where he was again wounded.

He received a three-month suspension as sanction for the loss of Bourgogne, wrecked on 4 February 1783. Champmartin retired on 10 October 1784.

== Sources and references ==
Notes

Citations

Bibliography

- Antier, Jean-Jacques (1991). L'Amiral de Grasse, héros de l'indépendance américaine. Rennes: Éditions de la Cité, Ouest-France. ISBN 9-782737-308642.
- Contenson, Ludovic (1934). La Société des Cincinnati de France et la guerre d'Amérique (1778-1783). Paris: éditions Auguste Picard. OCLC 7842336.
- Lacour-Gayet, Georges (1910). La marine militaire de la France sous le règne de Louis XVI. Paris: Honoré Champion.
- Roche, Jean-Michel (2005). Dictionnaire des bâtiments de la flotte de guerre française de Colbert à nos jours, 1671 - 1870. Group Retozel-Maury Millau. pp. 325–6. ISBN 978-2-9525917-0-6. OCLC 165892922.
- Troude, Onésime-Joachim (1867). Batailles navales de la France (in French). Vol. 2. Challamel ainé.

External links

- Archives nationales (2011). "Fonds Marine, sous-série B/4: Campagnes, 1571-1785" (PDF).
