= French ship Bourgogne (1766) =

Ship of the line of the French Navy

History

France
- Name: Bourgogne
- Namesake: Bourgogne
- Ordered: 16 January 1762
- Builder: Toulon Dyd
- Laid down: 31 January 1762
- Launched: 26 June 1766
- Commissioned: November 1767
- Fate: Wrecked 4 February 1783.

General characteristics
- Displacement: 2900 tonneaux
- Tons burthen: 1550 port tonneaux
- Length: 54.57 m (179 ft 0 in) (gundeck); 47.43 m (155 ft 7 in) (keel)
- Beam: 14.13 m (46 ft 4 in)
- Draught: 6.66 m (21 ft 10 in) (fore); 7.47 m (24 ft 6 in) (aft)
- Depth of hold: 6.98 m (22 ft 11 in)
- Propulsion: sail
- Sail plan: full rigged
- Complement: 840
- Armament: Lower deck: 28 × 36-pounder guns; Upper deck: 30 × 18-pounder guns; Galliards: 16 × 8-pounder guns

Bourgogne was a 74-gun ship of the line of the French Navy. She was funded by a don des vaisseaux donation from the Estates of Bourgogne. She was commissioned in 1772, and served in the squadron of the Mediterranean, with a refit in 1775, and another in 1778.

== Career ==
On 4 May 1779, off Gibraltar, she took part in a naval action with Victoire against the 32-gun frigates HMS Thetis and Montreal. Montreal was captured, while Thetis managed to escape.

British records largely agree, though they put the encounter on 1 May. When Thetis and Montreal saw two large ships approaching under Dutch colours, they suspected that the strange ships were French and attempted to sail away. Thetis succeeded, but at 9p.m., Bourgogne and Victoire caught up with Montreal, came alongside, and ordered Douglas to send over a boat. Captain Douglas sent over Lieutenant John Douglas, whom the French ordered to Douglas to hail Montreal and instruct her to strike. Captain Douglas attempted to escape, but after the French had fired several broadsides into Montreal he struck.

Bourgogne took part in the American Revolutionary War under Charles de Charritte, most notably at the Battle of the Chesapeake on 5 September 1781 and at the Battle of the Saintes, where she collided with Duc de Bourgogne.

On 11 September 1781 Bourgogne and Aigrette were in the Chesapeake. There they captured the frigate HMS Richmond, which the French Navy took into service as Richemont.

== Fate ==
She was wrecked on 4 February 1783, off Curaçao with the loss of 80 of her 840 crew. Her captain, Pierre Joseph François Samson de Champmartin, was court-martialled and suspended for three months as punishment.
