= François Aimé Louis Dumoulin =

Swiss artist (1753–1834)

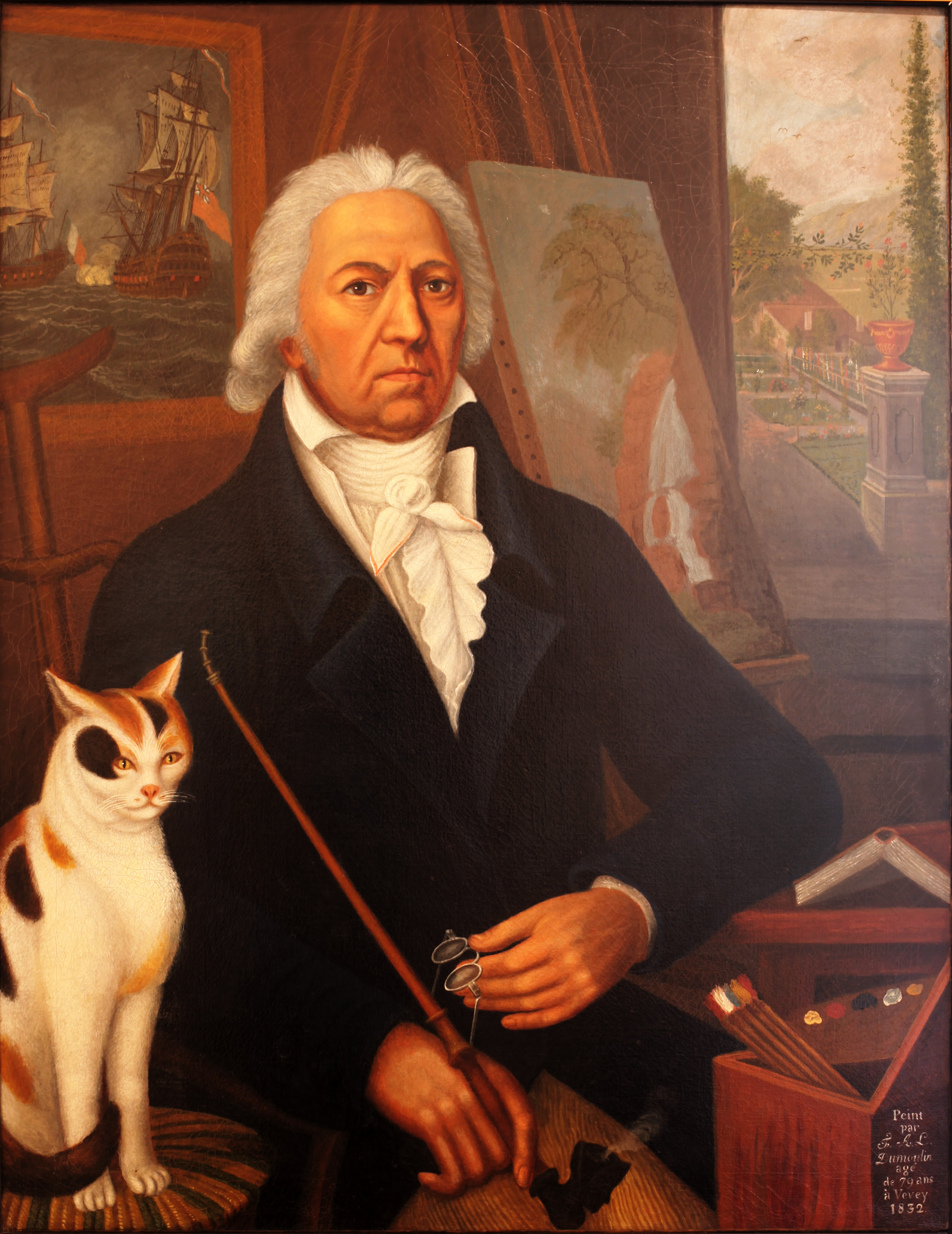
- Self-portrait, painted by F.A.L. Dumoulin at the age of 79 in Vevey, 1832, on display at Vevevy history museum
- Born: 10 August 1753; Vevey
- Died: 16 February 1834 (aged 80); Vevey
- Education: Autodidact

François Aimé Louis Dumoulin (French pronunciation: [fʁɑ̃swa eme lwi dymulɛ̃]; 10 August 1753 – 16 February 1834) was a Swiss painter and engraver.

== Biography ==
Although he received some education in technical drawing, Dumoulin was initially intended for a commercial career. In 1772, he sailed to England and to America the next year. Arriving in Grenada, he made business while drawing plans and views for the governor.

From 1776 to 1782, Dumoulin was a witness to the American War of Independence, drawing several naval battles between the French Navy and the British Royal Navy.

Returned to Vevey in 1783, he turned his sketches of the battles into oil paintings and watercolours, earning his life diving drawing lessons.

Between 1795 and 1797, Dumoulin was in Paris, where he took lessons in anatomy, copied ancient paintings in the Louvre, attended the Academy and the School of naval constructions. Two of his paintings of naval battles were exposed at the 1796 Salon.

Back to Vevey in 1797, he opened a class in technical drawing.

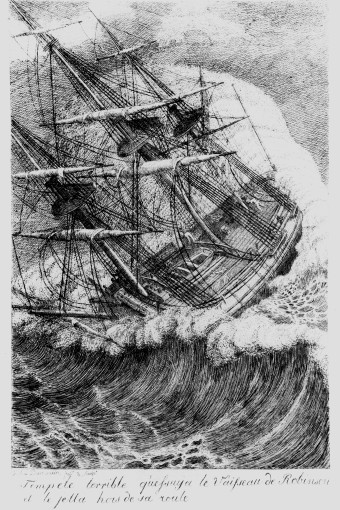
La Tempête, one of the 150 drawings on Robinson Crusoe

In 1810, Dumoulin published a collection of 150 engravings themed on the journey of Robinson Crusoe, which is considered to be a precursor to modern comics.

== Sources and references ==
=== Bibliography ===
- Carl Brun, Schweizerisches Künstler-Lexikon, Frauenfeld, 1905–1917, p. 397.
- Paul Morand, Monsieur Dumoulin à l’Isle de la Grenade, Paudex, 1976 [biographie fictive et littéraire avec des reproductions en couleur des œuvres du Musée historique de Vevey].
- Françoise Bonnet Borel, «Dumoulin, peintre veveysan», dans Vibiscum, 2, 1991, p. 59-97.
- Annie Renonciat, « Le Robinson de Dumoulin : un roman en 150 estampes (ca 1810) », dans 9e Art, Les Cahiers du musée de la bande dessinée, Angoulême, n° 8, janvier 2003, p. 10-19.
- Thierry Smolderen, « Ceci n’est pas une bulle ! - Structures énonciatives du phylactère », 2006
