= Saint-Martin-d'Ary =

- Commune
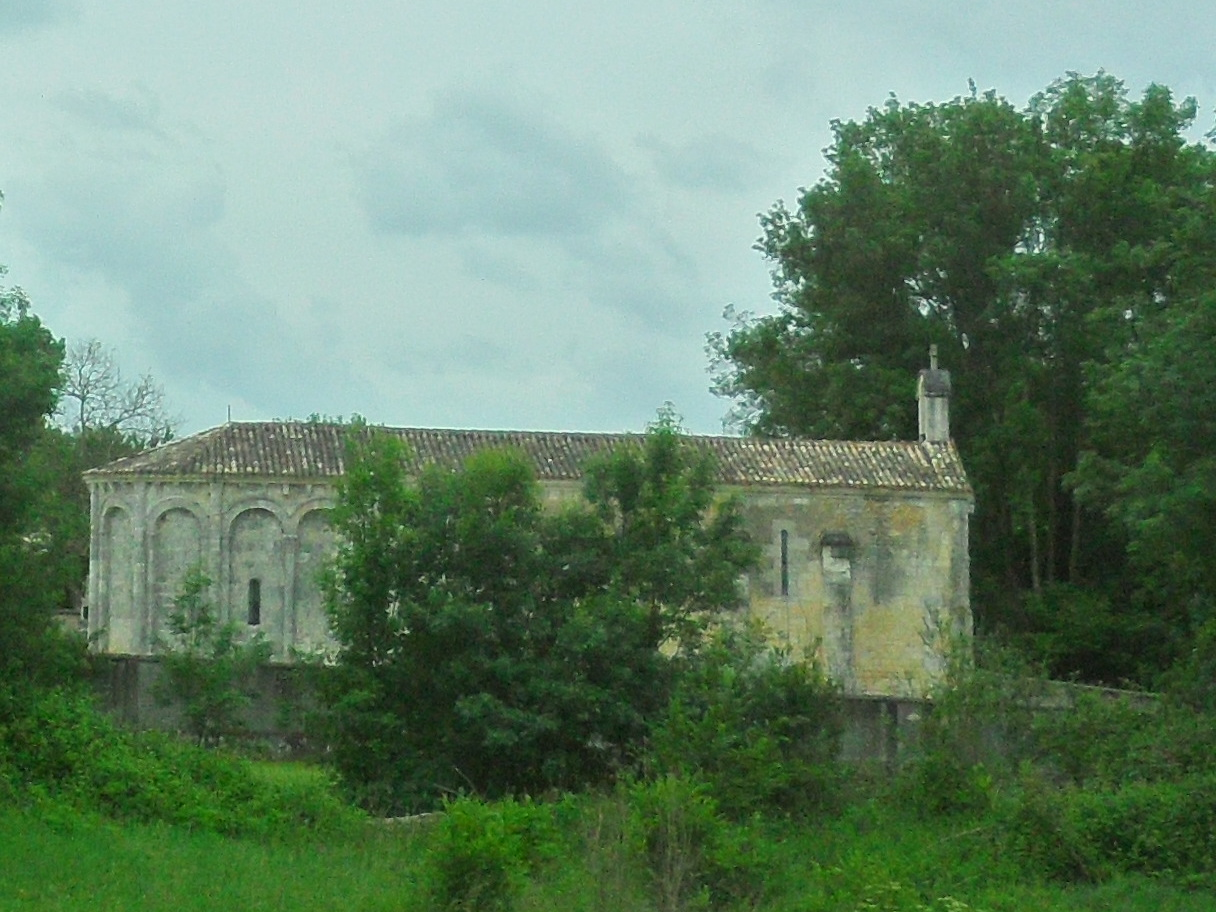
- The church in Saint-Martin-d'Ary
- Location of Saint-Martin-d'Ary
- Location within France Location within Nouvelle-Aquitaine
- Coordinates: 45°13′36″N 0°12′47″W
- Country: France
- Region: Nouvelle-Aquitaine
- Department: Charente-Maritime
- Arrondissement: Jonzac
- Canton: Les Trois Monts
- Intercommunality: Haute-Saintonge

Government
  - Mayor (2020–2026): Jean-Marc Paillé
- Area^{1}: 8.61 km^{2} (3.32 sq mi)
- Elevation: 82 m (269 ft)
- Highest elevation: 102 m (335 ft)
- Lowest elevation: 39 m (128 ft)
- Population (2023): 470
  - Density: 55/km^{2} (140/sq mi)
- Time zone: UTC+01:00 (CET)
  - Summer (DST): UTC+02:00 (CEST)
- INSEE/Postal code: 17365 /17270
- ^{1} French Land Register data, which excludes lakes, ponds, glaciers > 1 km^{2} (0.386 sq mi or 247 acres) and river estuaries.

Saint-Martin-d'Ary (French pronunciation: [sɛ̃ maʁtɛ̃ daʁi]) is a commune in the Charente-Maritime department in southwestern France. There are three parts that make up Saint-Martin-d'Ary. People who live there are called Saint-Martinois and the Saint-Martinoises. The church and its town hall, the town hall and school located at Les Sables, and a suburb bordering Montguyon

== Population ==
Historical population
Year	Pop.	±% p.a.
1968	466	—
1975	476	+0.30%
1982	443	−1.02%
1990	483	+1.09%
1999	479	−0.09%
2007	502	+0.59%
2012	468	−1.39%
2017	473	+0.21%
2023	470	−0.11%
Source: INSEE

== See also ==
- Communes of the Charente-Maritime department
