= Stephen Watson Fullom =

British author (1818–1872)

Stephen Watson Fullom (1818 – 1872) was a journalist, author of several books, and a publisher's reader.

== Career ==
Several of Fullom's books were reviewed in the Athenaeum. His book The marvels of science, and their testimony to Holy Writ, first published by Longman in 1852, was a best-seller of its day and by 1856 had run through 10 editions. He was a publisher's reader for the firm of Henry Colburn and recommended Margaret Oliphant's first novel (Margaret Maitland) for publication.

== Family ==
On 31 August 1847 he married Caroline Elizabeth Wickham.

== Books ==
- The daughter of night: a story of the present time. 1851.
- The marvels of science, and their testimony to Holy Writ. London: Longman. 1852. 6th edition. 1853.
- Great highway: a story of the world's struggles. By S. W. Fullom ... With illustrations on steel by John Leech. 1854.
- History of woman, and her connexion with religion, civilization, & domestic manners, from the earliest period. 1855.
- The Man of the World; Or, Vanities of the Day. 1856.
- The Exile's Daughter. 1860.
- History of William Shakespeare, player and poet: with new facts and traditions. 1862.
- Life of General Sir Howard Douglas, bart., G.C.B., G.C.M.G., F.R.S., D.C.L., from his notes, conversations, and correspondence. 1863.
- Rome Under Pius IX. 1864.
- Time Will Tell: A Story of Society. 1868.
- Fullom, Stephen Watson (1871). The Last Days of Jerusalem.
