= D'Estaing family =

Extinct French noble family

d'Estaing
- French noble family
- Azure, three fleurs-de-lis Or; a chief of the second.
- Country: France
- Origin: Rouergue

The d'Estaing family was one of the most notable noble families of the Rouergue and Auvergne regions of France. They originated from Estaing, in the modern Aveyron department, where their châtelain was first mentioned in 1028.

The d'Estaing family became extinct in 1794 with the death of Admiral Charles Henri d'Estaing, who had no son as heir. The genealogy of the d'Estaing family has not documented any connection to French President Valéry Giscard d'Estaing's family, even if the latter was permitted to add the name to its own in 1922.

== History ==
In 1214, at the Battle of Bouvines, Déodat, known as Tristan, was said to have saved the life of King Philippe Auguste and given him his horse. In recognition, the king gave Déodat the right to adopt the arms of France, keeping the golden chief that covered his former arms. Recent historians have not been able to confirm the veracity of this legend.

The family produced prelates, officers, Knights of Malta and numerous notable figures. It received the Honneurs de la Cour (a prestigious honour granted only to the families of ancient nobility and allowing them to approach the King and the Queen) in 1750.

== Notable members ==
- Guillaume I d’Estaing was a companion of Richard the Lionheart during the Third Crusade (1189-1192).
- Tristan Dieudonné d’Estaing saved the life of King Philippe Auguste at Bouvines in 1214. In recognition of this event, he received the right to place three fleurs de lys on his shield. This fact is today contested.
- Guillaume d'Estaing, lord of Estaing, married in 1319 Ermengarde de Peyre, lady of Valentines, daughter of Astorg IX of Peyre and de Maguerire of Murat, lady of Cheylade who gave him eight children, including :
  - Raymond d'Estaing married in 1350 Baranne de Castelnau;
  - Flore d'Estaing, married Aymeric d'Aurillac, lord of Conros;
  - Cardinal Pierre d'Estaing made part of the Pontifical Court at Avignon. He was pontifical legate for Gregory XI to the pontifical states in Italy;
  - Richarde d'Estaing, married in 1345 Géraud de Murat, lord of Lugarde, Allagnat and Ségur;
  - Marguerite d'Estaing, married Pierre IV, lord of Brezons
- Dieudonné d'Estaing, nephew of the cardinal, dean of Laon then bishop of Tricastin (1388–1411)
- Guillaume d'Estaing distinguished himself in the fight against infidels (?).
- Jean d'Estaing ( -1495), chamarier of Lyon from 1480 to 1494, was named in 1484 governor of the county of Rodez and Montagnes de Rouergue.
- François d'Estaing, rector of Comtat Venaissin, from 1505 to 1509, bishop of Rodez from 1504 to 1529, built the bell tower at the Rodez Cathedral.
- Antoine d'Estaing (1455 - †28 February 1523), member of the grand council of Louis XII (1495), Bishop of Angoulême (1506–1523), dean of the chapter of Lyon (1514).
- L'Abbé Charles d'Estaing (ca1595-1661), lord of Cheylade and Marchastel, Knight of the Order of Saint John of Jerusalem. Violent, debauched and greedy, he tried to reestablish taxes that fallen out of use for more than a century, provoking a revolt. Tried in his absence and sentenced to death by the Court of Grands Jours d'Auvergne, his property was confiscated and his title removed. His sentence was commuted to service in a regiment serving in Germany, where he distinguished himself by his courage and died rehabilitated in 1661, without having married. In his will, he mentioned a daughter, Marguerite, as his natural child (illegitimate). He was regarded by the Giscard d'Estaing family as the first of the d'Estaing family of Puy-de-Dôme; they took their name from him.
- Admiral d'Estaing (Ravel 1729 - Paris 1794), son of Charles-François and Marie-Henrielle de Colbert, played a significant part in the naval wars of the 18th century and in the American Revolutionary War. He was named an admiral in 1792 by the Legislative Assembly, but was guillotined in 1794 during the French Revolution. Having lost his only son, he legitimised his half-sister Lucie-Madeleine and, on 25 February 1768, made her heir to his property, in particular the Château de Ravel. Known under the title Comte d'Estaing, he commanded the National Guard of Versailles during the October March in 1789.

=== The last d'Estaings ===
At the end of the 18th century, all the branches of the d'Estaing family were descended from a single couple: Jean d'Estaing (1540-1621), lord of Val, married in 1580 Gilberte de la Rochefoucauld (1560–1623), lady Ravel, they had four sons :

- 1° François II d'Estaing, founded the comtes de Ravel branch for three generations to :
  - François IV d'Estaing (Ravel 1693 - Paris 1729), count of Estaing, who died without heir and was succeeded by Admiral d'Estaing below;
- 2° Père Louis d'Estaing, grand aumônier de France;
- 3° Jacques d'Estaing (?-1657), lord of Terrisse, married Catherine du Bourg, lady of Saillant, from whom were descended after four generations :
  - Admiral d'Estaing and his half-sister
  - Lucie Madeleine d'Estaing (Paris 1743 - Clermont-Ferrand 1826), viscounts of Ravel in Auvergne, illegitimate half-sister of the admiral, mistress of Louis XV; married, she had numerous descendants, including two daughters by Louis XV.
- 4° L'Abbé Charles d'Estaing (ca1595-1661), lord of Cheylade, Knight of the Order of Saint John of Jerusalem. He died in 1661 with a debauched reputation, having made two wills in which he recognised a natural daughter but no son. However, the Giscard d'Estaing genealogy attributes their paternity to Joachim d'Estaing, lord of Réquistat. No birth record or other document exists for Charles' daughter.

== Other Destaing or d'Estaing families ==
=== Destaing of Cantal ===
Notable legal family, established in the Carladès, with noble connections from the start of the 16th century, ending with :

- Zacharie Destaing (Aurillac 1764 - Paris 1802), general, son of Pierre Destaing and Marie-Gabrielle Delzons, seventh generation descendant of :
  - Jehan Destaing, lord of Labouygues, royal notary in Marcolès, in the Cantal département, and Souveraine de Chivialle.

It could be a collateral branch of the d'Estaing family.

=== Destaing of Réquistat ===
In 1922, following a request, the Giscard family was authorised by decree of the Council of State to add "d'Estaing" to its name, even though the link between the two families was distant and derived through illegitimate and female-line descent:

- Edmond Giscard (1894–1982), father of Valéry Giscard d'Estaing (1926–2020), was a ninth-generation descendant of Joseph D'Estaing (Jabrun 1648 - Jabrun 1711), son of Joachim D'Estaing and Suzanne Paulet, self-styled noble, lord of Réquistat and of Boissière, with remote kinship with Jean d'Estaing who bought the Château de Réquistat around 1669 to give to his daughter Marie-Claire. Joachim I d'Estaing, sieur de Réquistat (1610–1685), was the son of Guillaume d'Estaing, sieur du Chambon, illegitimate son of Jean III d'Estaing, seigneur de Val (1540–1621). As a descendant of an illegitimate line, he was condemned as a usurper of nobility by a judgement of 5 May 1667. His descendant, Lucie Madeleine d'Estaing, Dame de Réquistat (1769–1844) is the female ancestor from whom the Giscard d'Estaings took their name.

== Castles ==
- Château d'Estaing
- Château de Murol
- Château de Ravel
- Château de Réquistat (-1590)
- Château de Saillans

== Bibliography ==
- Hippolyte de Barrau, Documents historiques sur le Rouergue (in French)
