= Kaamelott: The First Chapter =

- Theatrical release poster
- Kaamelott : Premier Volet
- Directed by: Alexandre Astier
- Screenplay by: Alexandre Astier
- Based on: Kaamelott by Alexandre Astier
- Produced by: Alexandre Astier; Henri Deneubourg; Agathe Sofer
- Starring: Alexandre Astier; Lionnel Astier; Anne Girouard; Thomas Cousseau; Frank Pitiot; Jean-Christophe Hembert; Audrey Fleurot; Jacques Chambon; Sting
- Music by: Alexandre Astier
- Production company: Regular
- Distributed by: SND Films
- Release date: 21 July 2021
- Country: France
- Language: French
- Budget: $16.2 million
- Box office: $22 million

Kaamelott: The First Chapter, also known as Kaamelott: First Installment (French: Kaamelott : Premier Volet) is a French comedy-drama fantasy film written, directed, produced by and starring Alexandre Astier, and a sequel to the television series Kaamelott created by Astier.

It is the first film of a planned trilogy set to conclude the story of the original series. It was released on 21 July 2021. The second installment will be divided in two parts, with the first one releasing in 22 October 2025.

== Synopsis ==
The film takes place after the series. At the end of Kaamelott, Arthur, having fallen into crippling depression, vacated the throne of Camelot and returned Excalibur to the stone it came from. Meanwhile, Arthur's former friend and companion Lancelot, under the influence of Maleagant, takes over Camelot and mercilessly hunts Arthur's former friends and allies. Having spent an extended time on the verge of death at his mother's home in Tintagel after a suicide attempt, Arthur escapes, with the help of the bandit Venec, to his former home of Rome to escape the wrath of Lancelot, and progressively regains his health and will to live at the home of his first wife, Aconia. Meanwhile, the Kingdom of Logres is resisting Lancelot, awaiting the moment when Arthur will return.

== Cast ==
Returning from the series

- Alexandre Astier as Arthur, former King of Britain and Kaamelott who resigned his kingship in the events of the series after returning Excalibur from the stone it came from.
- Thomas Cousseau as Lancelot of the Lake, a former Knight of the Table Round who used to be Arthur's friend and most trusted companion, until he rebelled against his authority. He took over Kaamelott, and now seeks to hunt all of Arthur's former friends and allies.
- Lionnel Astier as Léodagan, King of Cameliard, Guenièvre's father, and Kaamelott's infamously greedy Minister of Defence and Justice.
- Anne Girouard as Guenièvre, former Queen of Britain and Camelot, and Arthur's former wife, who then started a relationship with Lancelot.
- Frank Pitiot as Perceval, Knight of Wales and Karadoc's best friend, known for his ineptitude as a knight and poor communication skills.
- Jean-Christophe Hembert as Karadoc, Knight of Vannes and Pervecal's best friend, known for his insatiable hunger.
- Joëlle Sevilla as Séli, the mother of Guenièvre and Léodagan's wife, and an original character created for Kaamelott.
- Audrey Fleurot as the Lady of the Lake / Viviane, originally a magical entity that only Arthur could hear and see and who was tasked with assisting his quest for the Holy Grail. In season 5, after Arthur gives up on his throne and quest, the gods, considering the Lady of the Lake responsible, banished her from their realm, making her human and mortal and sending her to the mortal realm.
- Jacques Chambon as Merlin, the incompetent Enchanter of Kaamelott.
- Alain Chabat as the Duke of Aquitaine
- Antoine de Caunes as Dagonet, a Knight of the Round Table
- Christian Clavier as The Jurisconsult
- François Morel as Belt, a winemaker
- Serge Papagalli as Guethenoc, a farmer

New characters

- Clovis Cornillac as Quarto.
- Guillaume Gallienne as Alzagar, a mercenary in the Red Sea.
- Sting as Horsa, a Saxon chief, under the orders of Lancelot.

== Production ==
Astier planned to conclude the story of Kaamelott in a trilogy of films shortly after the end of the series in 2009, with the first one to be title Kaamelott Résistance ("Kaamelott Resistance"), that would conclude the story; he announced the project in July 2012 at Com!c Con' and had finished writing the three films by then. Although filming was originally announced to begin in 2013, various issues led to the project being repeatedly postponed. The first issue faced by Astier was the production company refusing to allocate him the rights to the series, leading to a legal battle. In January 2018, he was still struggling to finance it.

After years of speculation, Astier unexpectedly announced on 22 January 2020 filming would begin a few days later. Shortly after the announcement, fake job offers for extras appeared and were inaccurately relayed in the media as legitimate, with Astier shortly denying those claims.

Astier is producing the film alongside Henri Deneubourg and Agathe Sofer. On 17 December 2019, Christian Clavier, who portrayed the Jurisconsult in season five of the television series, confirmed that he would reprise his role in the film.

Filming took place in the spring of 2019, in Le Bessat (Loire) and in the Auvergne-Rhône-Alpes Studios located at the Pôle PIXEL business in Villeurbanne (Metropolis of Lyon), as well as in Les Estables (Haute-Loire), at the Château de Murol in Murol (Puy-de-Dôme), but also in Bressieux (Isère), Bron (Metropolis of Lyon) and in Montélimar (Drôme). Filming also partially took place in Oman.

== Release ==
The film was originally meant to be released on 14 October 2020, but Astier announced on 22 January 2020, that it would be released 3 months, on 29 July. On 7 May, SND delayed the film to 25 November due to the COVID-19 pandemic and the closing of French theaters. On 19 October, SND removed the film from the release calendar. On 12 March 2021, SND announced a new release date of 21 July 2021.
