= Dauzat =

Dauzat may refer to

- Albert Dauzat (1877–1955), French linguist
- Dauzat-sur-Vodable, a commune in central France

== See also ==
- Adrien Dauzats, French painter
