= Limagne =

Plain in France

Coordinates: 46°00′N 3°15′E

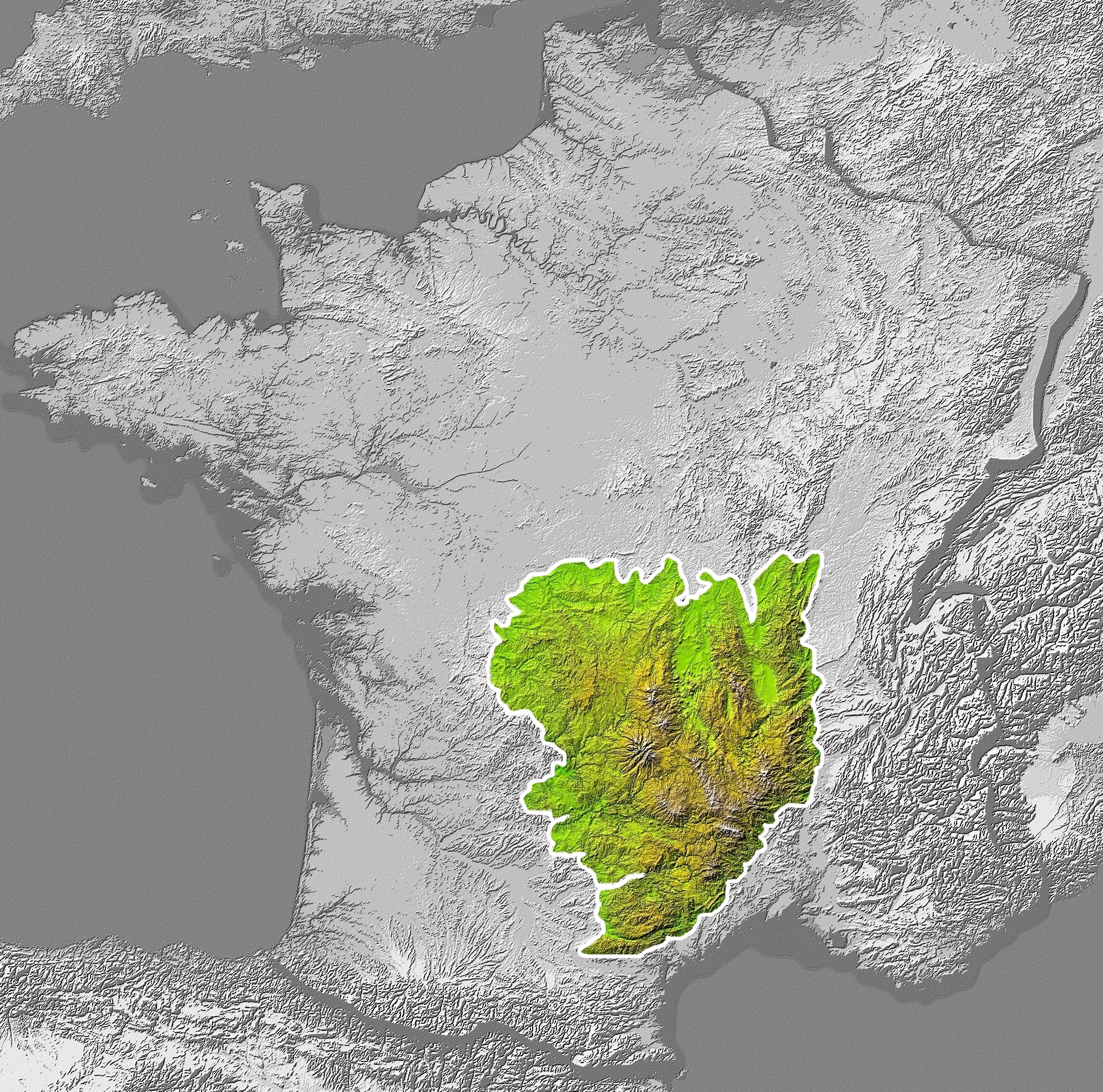
Location of the Massif Central in France

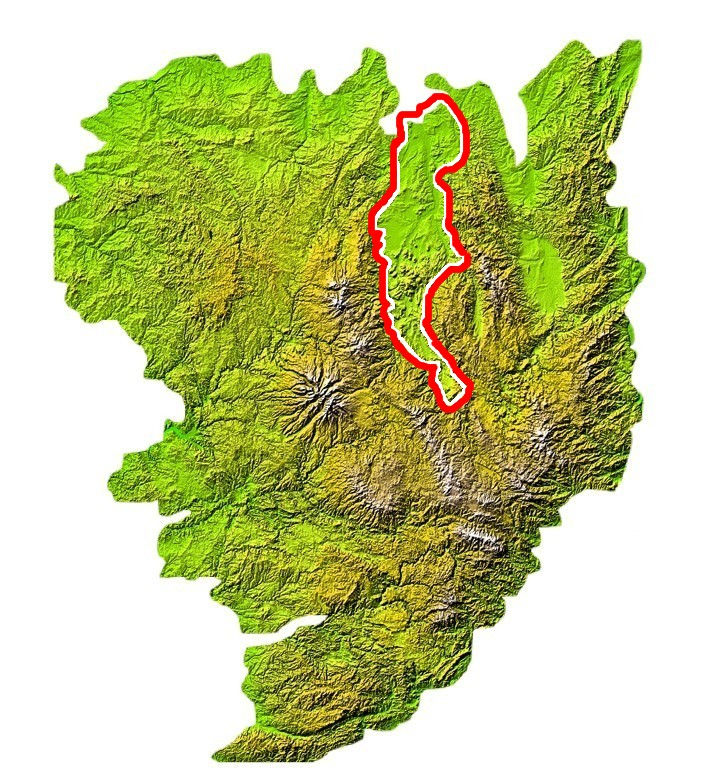
Location of the Limagne in the Massif Central

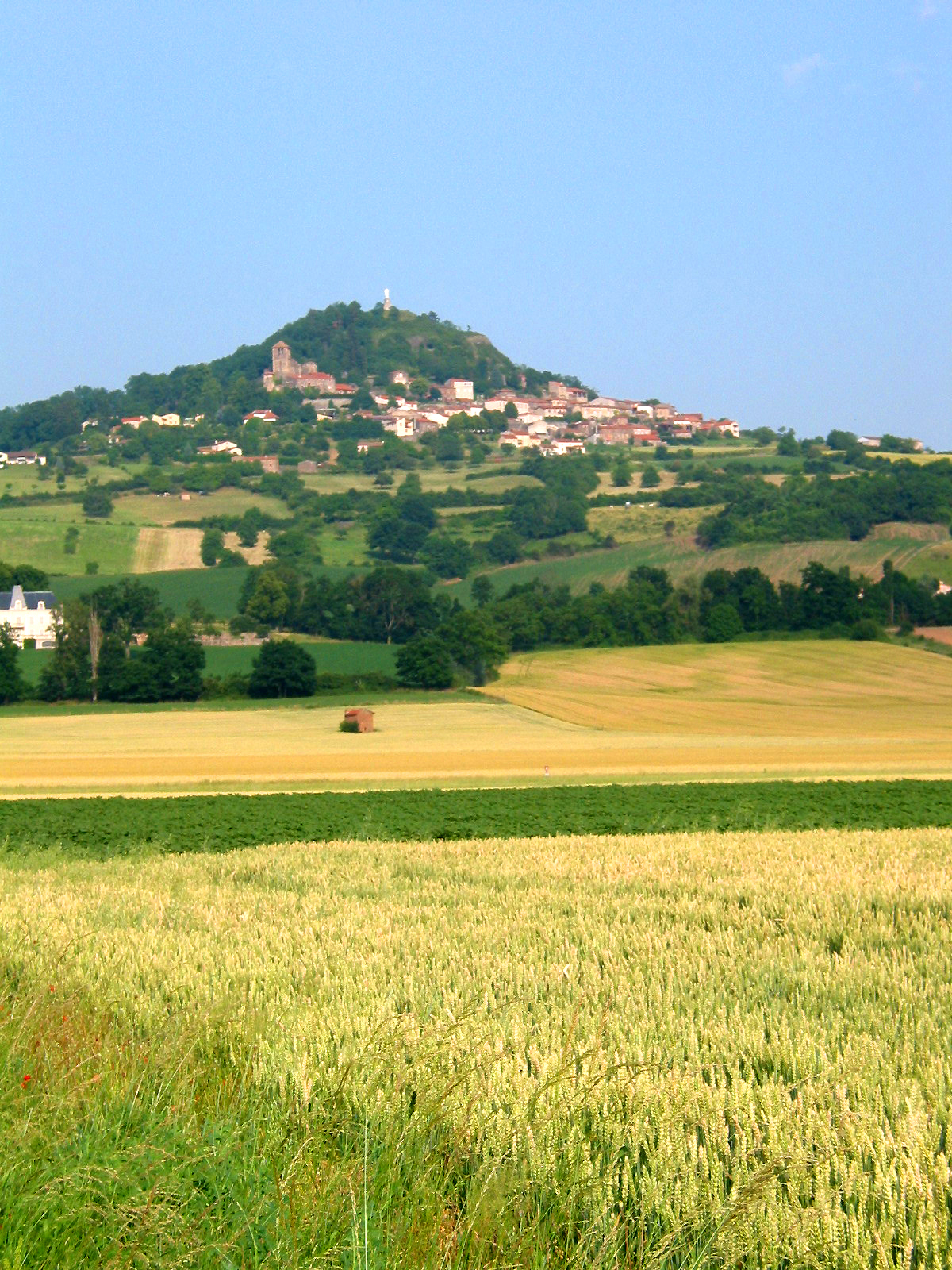
The village of Usson on the edge of the Limagne plain

The Limagne (French pronunciation: [limaɲ]; Occitan: Limanha) is a large plain in the Auvergne region of France in the valley of the Allier river, on the edge of the Massif Central. It mainly lies within the départements of Puy-de-Dôme, Allier and Haute-Loire. The term is sometimes used to include this, and three other less extensive plains, that lie along the valley of the Allier, in which case the first is known as Grande Limagne to distinguish it from the others. The name is derived from the Latin Lacus Magnus, or large lake.

== Geology ==
The Limagne plain is a graben, downthrown from the Massif Central by a series of normal faults that border the western edge of the plain. It contains about 2 km of sediments, and the amount of stretching of the crust is estimated as 1.2–1.3. The rifting started in the Late Eocene and the main phase of subsidence continued into the Late Oligocene. The Limagne Graben forms part of a system of linked rifts, including the Rhine Graben, known as the European Cenozoic Rift System, that formed in response to compressional deformation of the Alpine foreland.

Volcanism accompanied the rifting and continued into the Pleistocene. The sediments deposited in the basin are affected by numerous intrusions. The area was the first where peperites were described, from a basaltic intrusion into lacustrine limestone.

== Economy ==
The Limagne is a very fertile plain and is mainly an area of cereal production, with some tobacco and sugar beet. Vineyards are found along the borders of the plain on the edge of the Massif Central, particularly at Corent and Châteaugay.

== Main sites of interest ==
- Auzon – Medieval village with a romanesque church
- Brioude – The basilica of St Julien
- Château de Ravel
- Effiat – For its château
- Issoire – Romanesque basilica
- Mozac Abbey – Celebrated for its romanesque sculptures
- Riom – Renaissance city, one of the French Towns and Lands of Art and History
- Usson, Puy-de-Dôme – Ruined fortress walls and the columnar jointed basalt, orgues basaltique. At the top of the butte, a statue of the virgin Mary and a panoramic view.
- Parentignat — For its 18th century château with its English garden, and the suspension bridge built in 1830.
