= Château de Ravel =

Castle in Puy-de-Dôme, France

Coordinates: 45°46′59″N 3°24′1″E

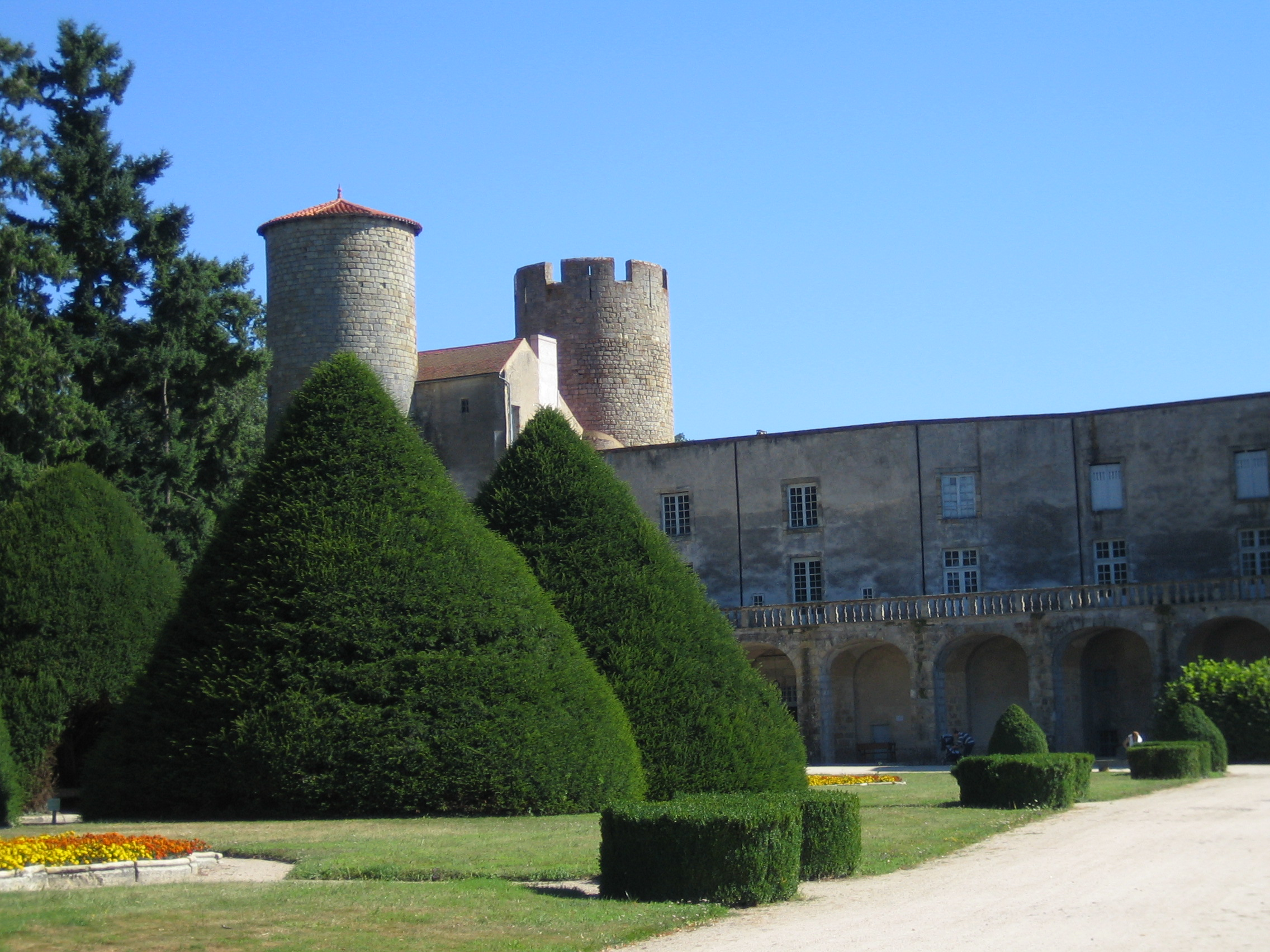
The Château de Ravel and its French gardens, designed by André Le Nôtre

The Château de Ravel is a castle situated in the commune of Ravel, in the département of Puy-de-Dôme, France.

The castle of Ravel was begun by Bernard de Ravel, noted in 1171. Purchased by Philip III of France in 1283, it was given by Philip IV to his future chancellor, Pierre Flotte. It passed by marriage and inheritance to the d'Estaing family, by the marriage of the heiress Marie Comborcier du Terrail with her cousin Jean d'Estaing, 1647. The interiors were renovated in the 17th and 18th centuries.

The present structure dates from a number of periods. The origins of the site date back to 1147, though the existing buildings are 13th century or later. The eastern walls and towers date back to feudal times. The main courtyard is from the 17th century and the western wing from the 18th. The terrace, overlooking the Limagne countryside and the chain of volcanic hills – the Chaîne des Puys – was laid out as a parterre in the 17th century.

The castle is regarded as an interesting example of how a medieval castle was converted into a stately home. The 18th century apartments were built without destroying the Gothic framework or the courtyard façade with its ancient towers. Inside, the same care was taken to include Gothic styles with newer, particularly the chapel and the castle's masterpiece, the Salle des Etats. Among the additions worthy of note are the staircase and entrance hall, the dining room, the great gallery and the music room.

The interior has a considerable amount of original furniture. Visitors can see the genealogy room (d'Estaing family portraits), the Salle des Etats with its terracotta tiled floor depicting the coats-of-arms, the music room (panelling decorated with musical instruments) and the gold room (beamed ceiling, four-poster bed and Aubusson tapestries. The great gallery has mementoes of Admiral d'Estaing, including a scale model of his ship, painting of naval battles and navigation instruments.

Privately owned, the Château de Ravel is listed as a monument historique by the French Ministry of Culture since 1958.

The castle was used as a location for the 2004 French film Les Choristes, directed by Christophe Barratier.

== See also ==
- List of castles in France

== Sources ==
- Green Guide: Auvergne, Rhône Valley, Michelin plc, 1995, p226 ISBN 2-06-130401-X
- Reportage History (French)
