= Boudes =

- Commune
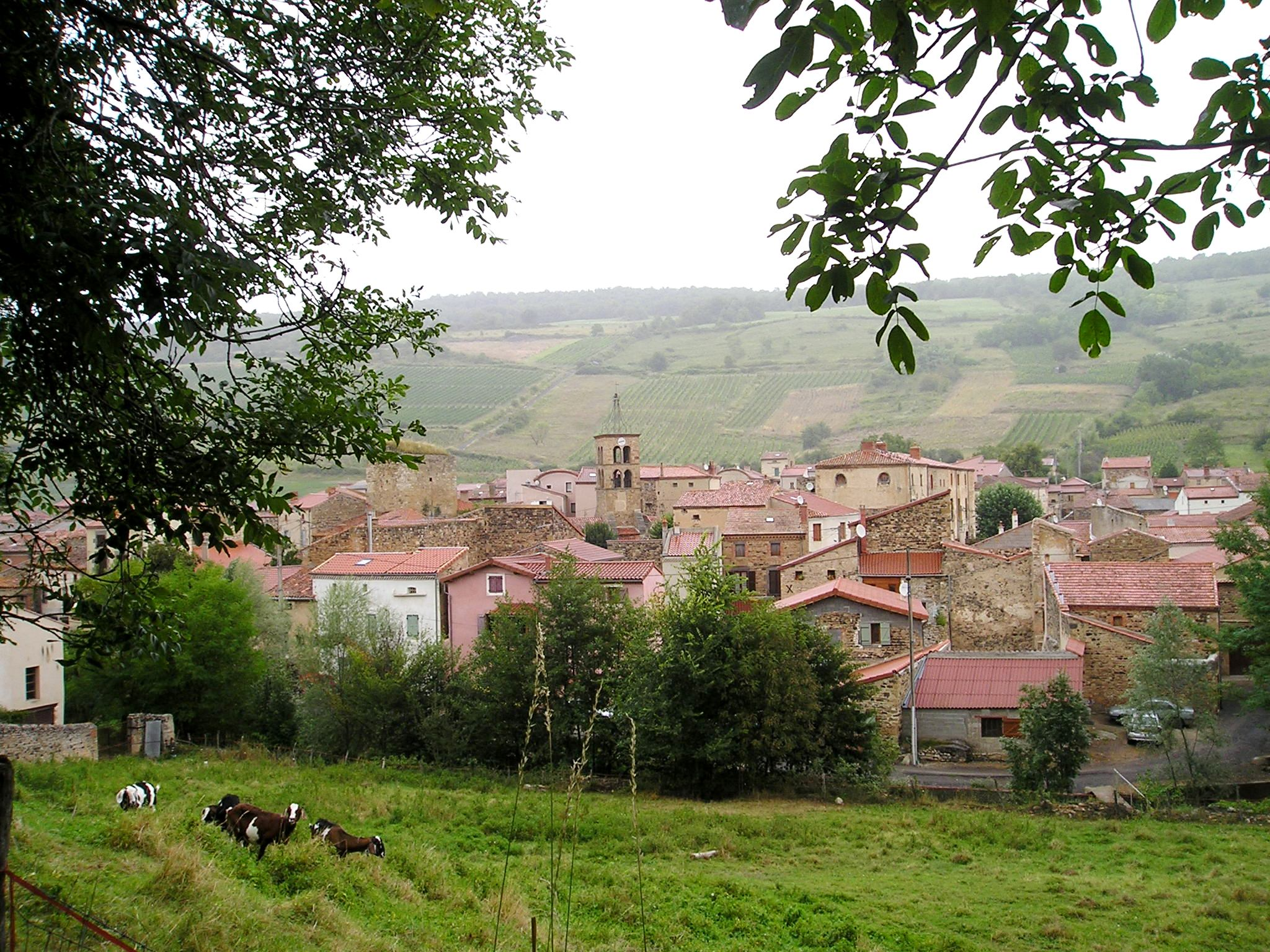
- A general view of Boudes

- Coat of arms
- Location of Boudes
- Location within France Location within Auvergne-Rhône-Alpes
- Coordinates: 45°27′37″N 3°11′07″E
- Country: France
- Region: Auvergne-Rhône-Alpes
- Department: Puy-de-Dôme
- Arrondissement: Issoire
- Canton: Brassac-les-Mines
- Intercommunality: Agglo Pays d'Issoire

Government
  - Mayor (2026–32): Samuel Nuñez-Ortin
- Area^{1}: 7.92 km^{2} (3.06 sq mi)
- Elevation: 450 m (1,480 ft)
- Highest elevation: 726 m (2,382 ft)
- Lowest elevation: 437 m (1,434 ft)
- Population (2023): 260
  - Density: 33/km^{2} (85/sq mi)
- Time zone: UTC+01:00 (CET)
  - Summer (DST): UTC+02:00 (CEST)
- INSEE/Postal code: 63046 /63340
- ^{1} French Land Register data, which excludes lakes, ponds, glaciers > 1 km^{2} (0.386 sq mi or 247 acres) and river estuaries.

Boudes (French pronunciation: [bud]) is a commune in the Puy-de-Dôme department in Auvergne-Rhône-Alpes in central France. It is in the canton of Brassac-les-Mines.

== Population ==
Historical population
Year	Pop.	±% p.a.
1968	256	—
1975	253	−0.17%
1982	252	−0.06%
1990	243	−0.45%
1999	252	+0.40%
2007	263	+0.54%
2012	272	+0.68%
2017	287	+1.08%
2023	260	−1.63%
Source: INSEE

== See also ==
- Communes of the Puy-de-Dôme department
