= Bergonne =

- Commune
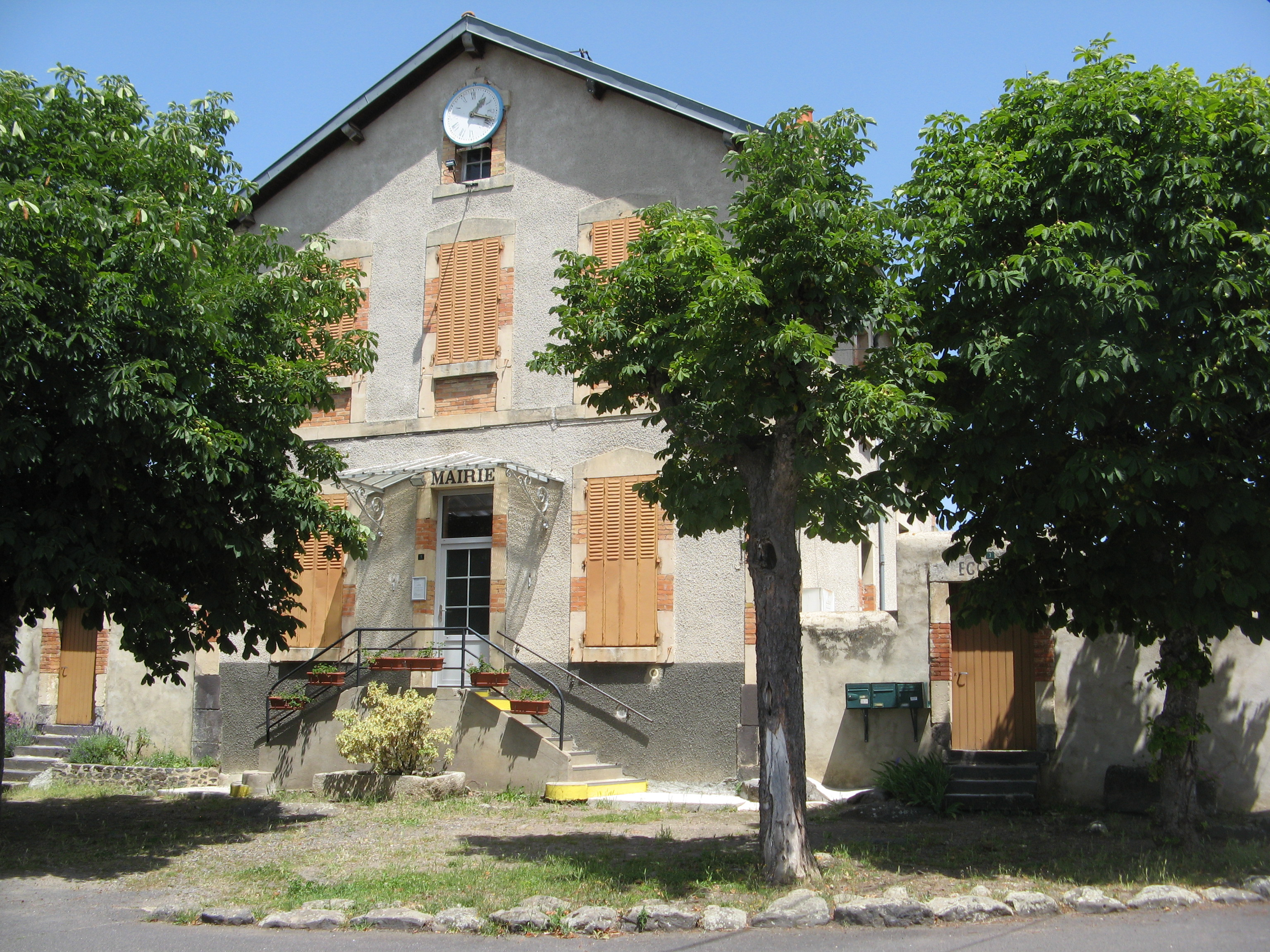
- The town hall in Bergonne
- Location of Bergonne
- Location within France Location within Auvergne-Rhône-Alpes
- Coordinates: 45°30′24″N 3°13′16″E
- Country: France
- Region: Auvergne-Rhône-Alpes
- Department: Puy-de-Dôme
- Arrondissement: Issoire
- Canton: Brassac-les-Mines
- Intercommunality: Agglo Pays d'Issoire

Government
  - Mayor (2020–2026): Marie-Françoise Foucault
- Area^{1}: 5.75 km^{2} (2.22 sq mi)
- Elevation: 480 m (1,570 ft)
- Highest elevation: 565 m (1,854 ft)
- Lowest elevation: 450 m (1,480 ft)
- Population (2023): 329
  - Density: 57.2/km^{2} (148/sq mi)
- Time zone: UTC+01:00 (CET)
  - Summer (DST): UTC+02:00 (CEST)
- INSEE/Postal code: 63036 /63500
- ^{1} French Land Register data, which excludes lakes, ponds, glaciers > 1 km^{2} (0.386 sq mi or 247 acres) and river estuaries.

Bergonne (French pronunciation: [bɛʁgɔn]) is a commune in the Puy-de-Dôme department in Auvergne-Rhône-Alpes in central France. It is in the canton of Brassac-les-Mines.

== Population ==
Historical population
Year	Pop.	±% p.a.
1968	242	—
1975	220	−1.35%
1982	275	+3.24%
1990	362	+3.50%
1999	333	−0.92%
2007	264	−2.86%
2012	334	+4.82%
2017	339	+0.30%
2023	329	−0.50%
Source: INSEE

== See also ==
- Communes of the Puy-de-Dôme department
