= Ludesse =

- Commune
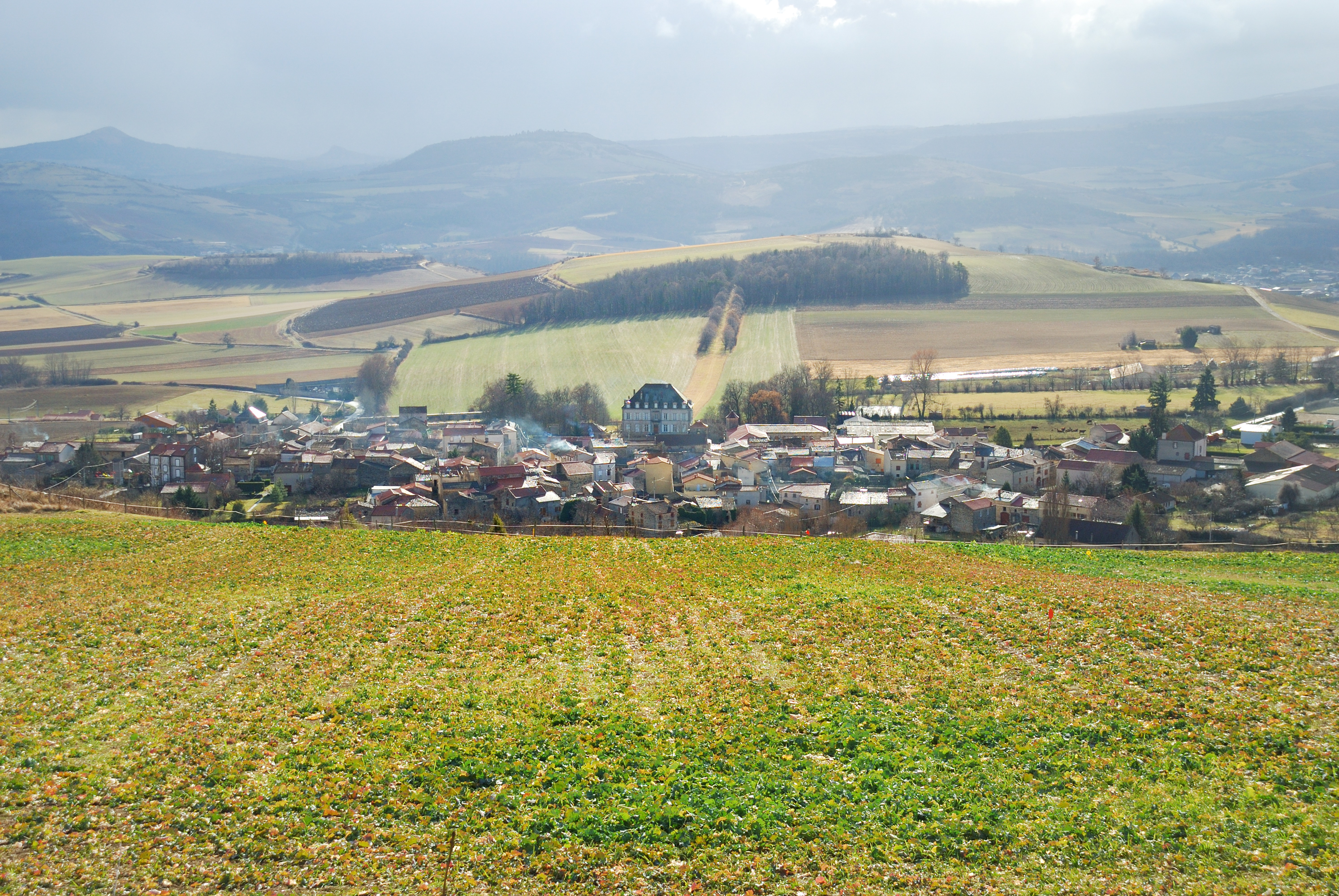
- A general view of Ludesse
- Location of Ludesse
- Location within France Location within Auvergne-Rhône-Alpes
- Coordinates: 45°36′43″N 3°06′44″E
- Country: France
- Region: Auvergne-Rhône-Alpes
- Department: Puy-de-Dôme
- Arrondissement: Issoire
- Canton: Le Sancy
- Intercommunality: Agglo Pays d'Issoire

Government
  - Mayor (2021–2026): Nicolas Alizert
- Area^{1}: 8.47 km^{2} (3.27 sq mi)
- Elevation: 600 m (2,000 ft)
- Highest elevation: 760 m (2,490 ft)
- Lowest elevation: 519 m (1,703 ft)
- Population (2023): 487
  - Density: 57.5/km^{2} (149/sq mi)
- Time zone: UTC+01:00 (CET)
  - Summer (DST): UTC+02:00 (CEST)
- INSEE/Postal code: 63199 /63320
- ^{1} French Land Register data, which excludes lakes, ponds, glaciers > 1 km^{2} (0.386 sq mi or 247 acres) and river estuaries.

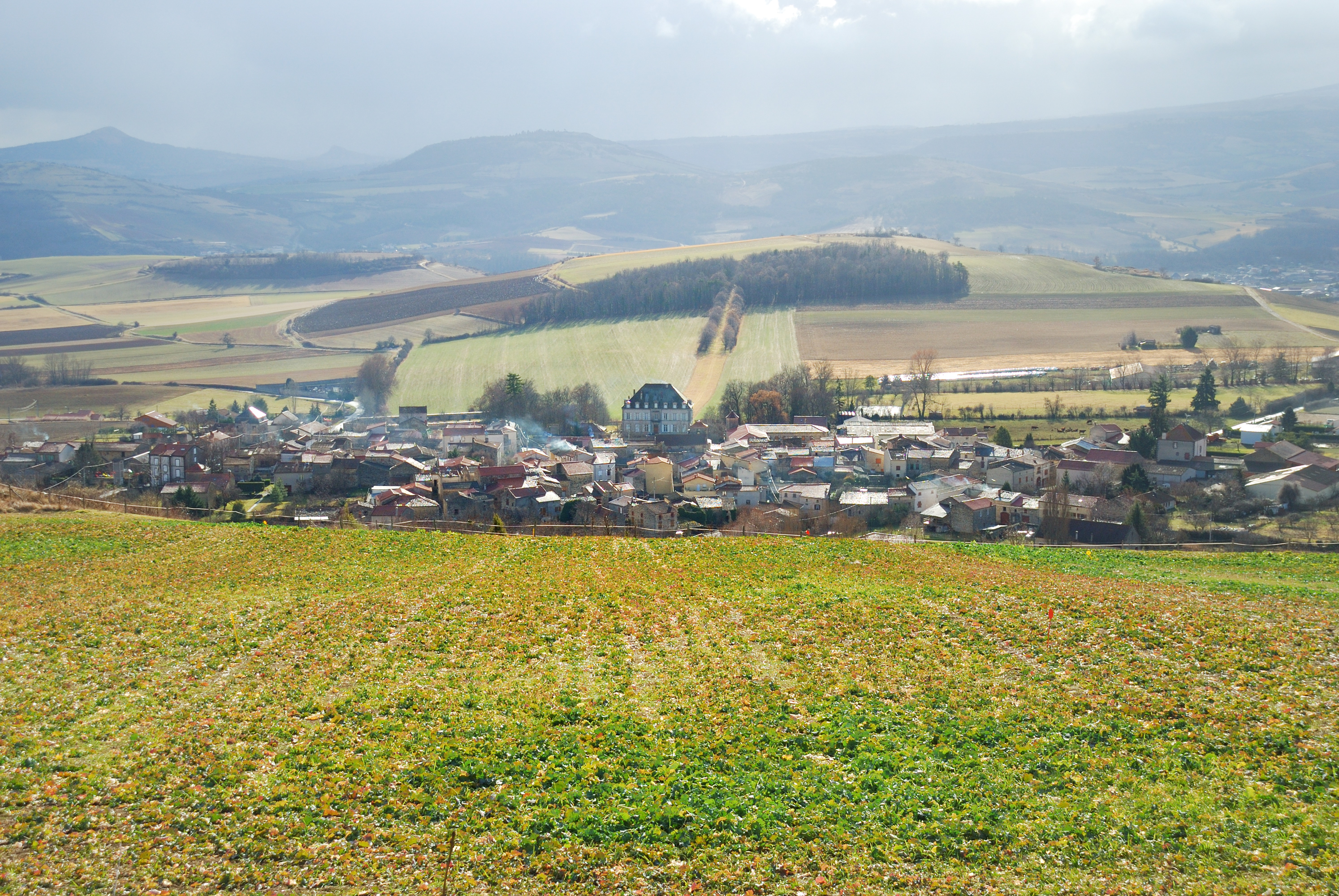
Ludesse

Ludesse (French pronunciation: [lydɛs]) is a commune in the Puy-de-Dôme department in Auvergne in central France.

== See also ==
- Communes of the Puy-de-Dôme department
