= Vichel =

- Commune
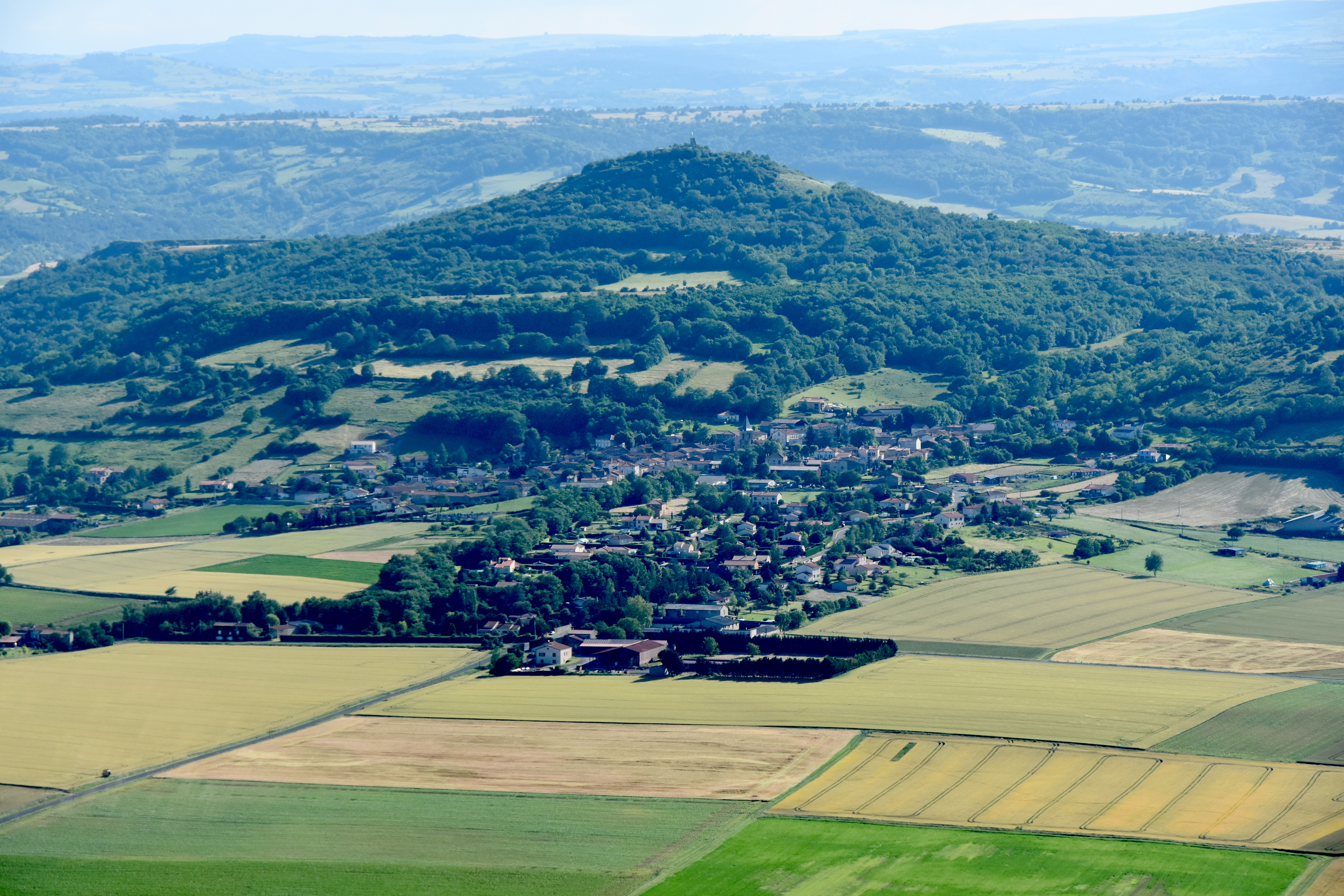
- A general view of Vichel

- Coat of arms
- Location of Vichel
- Location within France Location within Auvergne-Rhône-Alpes
- Coordinates: 45°25′46″N 3°14′37″E
- Country: France
- Region: Auvergne-Rhône-Alpes
- Department: Puy-de-Dôme
- Arrondissement: Issoire
- Canton: Brassac-les-Mines
- Intercommunality: Agglo Pays d'Issoire

Government
  - Mayor (2026–32): Marie-Laure Massardier
- Area^{1}: 5.71 km^{2} (2.20 sq mi)
- Elevation: 530 m (1,740 ft)
- Highest elevation: 741 m (2,431 ft)
- Lowest elevation: 466 m (1,529 ft)
- Population (2023): 327
  - Density: 57.3/km^{2} (148/sq mi)
- Time zone: UTC+01:00 (CET)
  - Summer (DST): UTC+02:00 (CEST)
- INSEE/Postal code: 63456 /63340
- ^{1} French Land Register data, which excludes lakes, ponds, glaciers > 1 km^{2} (0.386 sq mi or 247 acres) and river estuaries.

Vichel (French pronunciation: [viʃɛl]) is a commune in the Puy-de-Dôme department in Auvergne in central France.

== See also ==
- Communes of the Puy-de-Dôme department
