= Charles Henri Hector, Count of Estaing =

French military officer and writer

Count of Estaing Charles Henri Hector
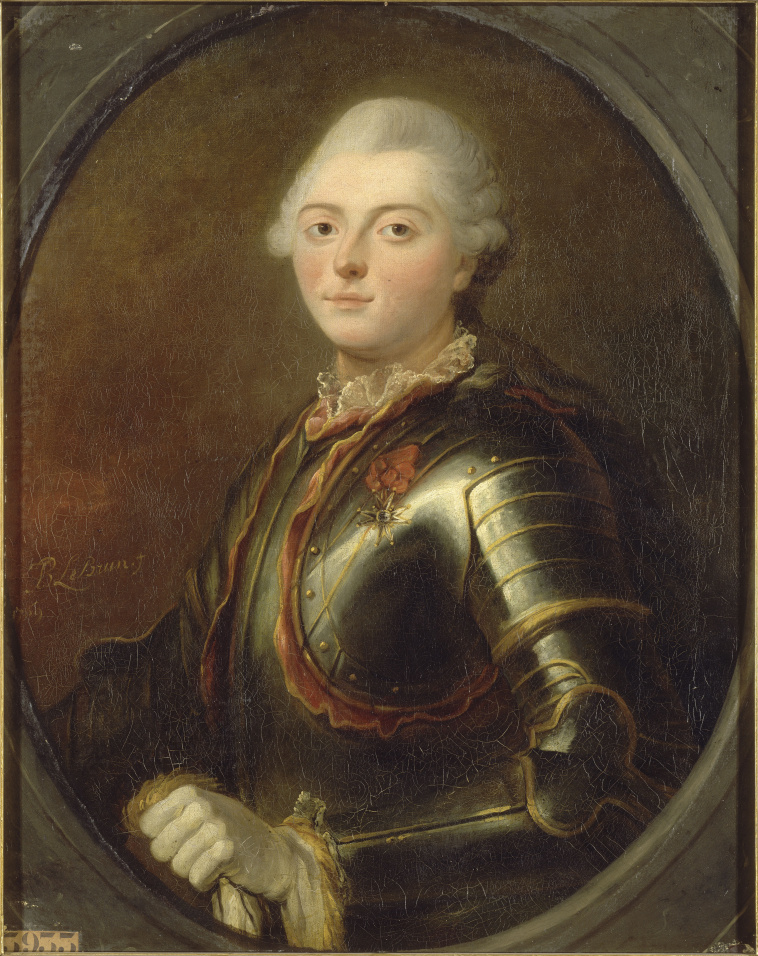
- Portrait by Jean-Baptiste Le Brun, 1769
- Born: 24 November 1729; Château de Ravel, Auvergne
- Died: 28 April 1794 (aged 64); Paris, France
- Spouse: Marie-Sophie Rousselot (m. 1746; died 1792)
- Children: 1
- Military career
- Allegiance: Kingdom of France; French First Republic
- Branch: French Royal Army; French Navy
- Rank: Lieutenant general (French Royal Army); Admiral (French Navy)
- Conflicts: War of the Austrian Succession; Seven Years' War; American Revolutionary War; Battle of St. Lucia; Capture of St. Lucia; Capture of Grenada (1779); Battle of Grenada; Siege of Savannah

Jean Baptiste Charles Henri Hector, Count of Estaing (French: [ʃaʁl ɑ̃ʁi dɛstɛ̃]; 24 November 1729 – 28 April 1794) was a French military officer and writer. He began his service as a soldier in the War of the Austrian Succession, briefly spending time as a prisoner of war of the British during the Seven Years' War. Naval exploits during the latter war prompted him to change branches of service, and he transferred to the French Navy.

Following France's entry into the American War of Independence in 1778, Estaing led a fleet to aid the American rebels. He participated in a failed Franco-American siege of Newport, Rhode Island, in 1778, and the equally unsuccessful 1779 Siege of Savannah. He did have success in the Caribbean before returning to France in 1780. His difficulties working with American counterparts are cited among the reasons these operations in North America failed.

Although Estaing sympathized with revolutionaries during the French Revolution, he held a personal loyalty to the French royal family. Because of this he came under suspicion, and was executed by guillotine in the Reign of Terror.

== Early years ==
Hector was born on 24 November 1729 at the Château de Ravel in Auvergne to Charles-François, the Marquis de Saillant and Marie-Henriette Colbert de Maulevrier, a descendant of Jean-Baptiste Colbert. His father was a lieutenant general in the French Army from a family with a long history of service to the French crown. The young Estaing was educated alongside Louis, the Dauphin (father of the future Louis XVI), who was born at about the same time. Estaing thus became close friends with the Dauphin and served in his retinue.

In May 1738 at the age of 9 he was nominally enrolled in the musketeers, as his aristocratic family chose military over civil service for him. He rose through the ranks, eventually joining the Regiment de Rouergue as a lieutenant in 1746. That same year he married Marie-Sophie Rousselet de Crozon de Château-Renault, granddaughter of the celebrated Marshal Château-Renault, they later had one son Théodat, who died in a childhood accident in 1759. His regiment was called to serve in the War of the Austrian Succession. Estaing served as aide-de-camp to Marshal Saxe throughout the Flanders campaigns from 1746 to 1748. During these years he was promoted to colonel in command of Regiment de Rouergue, and was wounded at the 1748 Siege of Maastricht.

Following the war, Louis XV embarked on a program to modernize his army on the successful model of Frederick the Great's Prussian army. Estaing became one of the leading reformers. After a few years, the Regiment de Rouergue was viewed "as a model of the infantry". Seeking to gain experience in diplomacy, Estaing accompanied the French ambassador to England for a time.

== Seven Years' War in India ==
When hostilities broke out between the British and French colonies in North America, Estaing considered joining the forces of Louis-Joseph de Montcalm that sailed in 1755, but his family dissuaded him from doing so. When an expedition to the East Indies was organized, he applied to participate without consulting his family. His participation was ensured when he was offered a back-dated promotion to brigadier-general, provided he could transfer command of his regiment to someone else, which he did. In early January 1757, shortly before embarking, Estaing was awarded the Order of Saint Louis.

=== Lally's campaigns ===
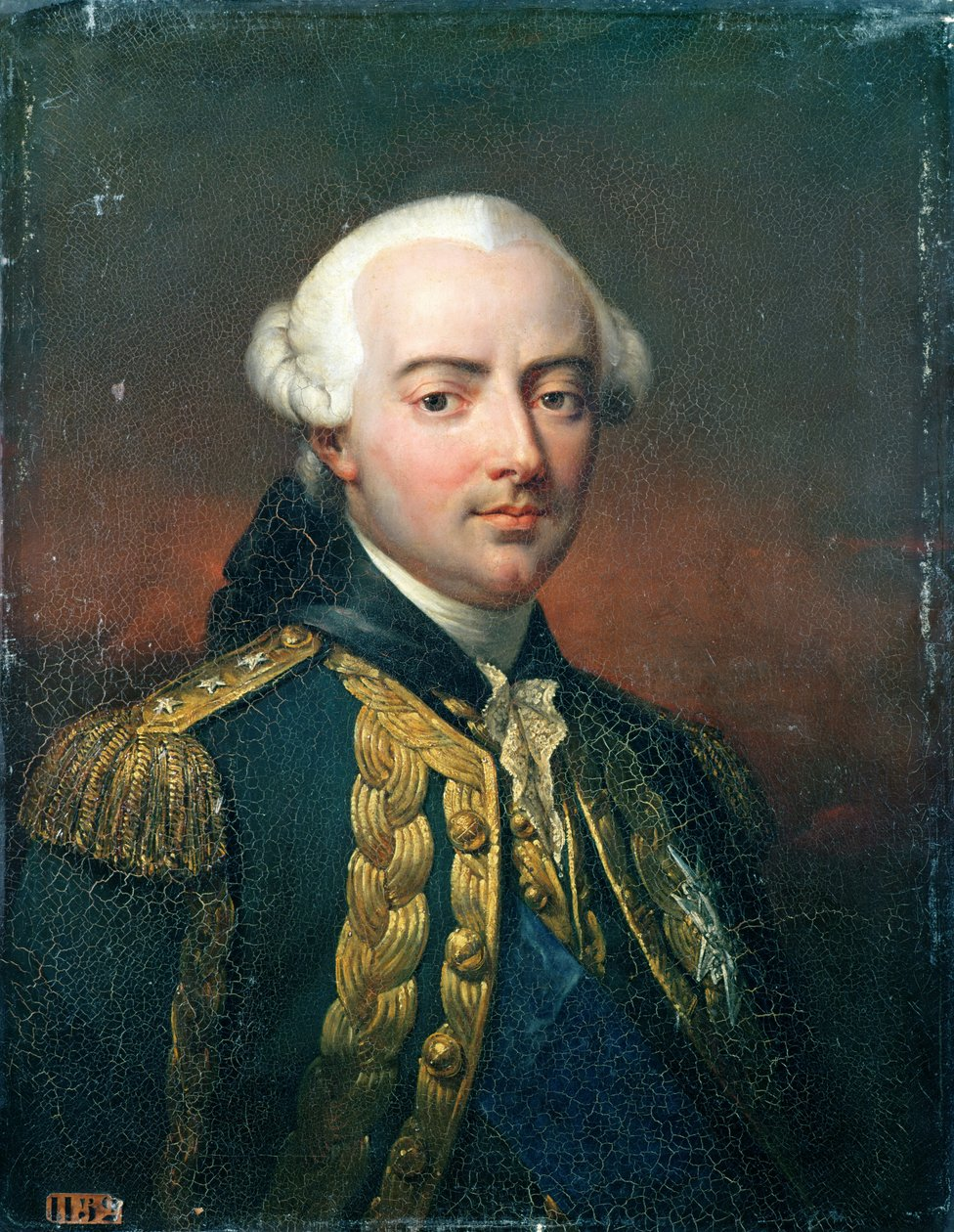
19th-century portrait of Estaing by Jean-Pierre Franque

After a lengthy journey, the fleet of the comte d'Aché, carrying the expeditionary forces whose land commander was the count de Lally, arrived off British-occupied Cuddalore in southern India on 28 April 1758. Lally disembarked his troops, established a blockade around the town, and then traveled to Pondicherry to organize the delivery of siege equipment. On 4 May French forces occupied the town and partially blockaded Fort St. David. The siege equipment was delayed in its arrival, but the garrison was eventually compelled to surrender after 17 days of siege operations. Estaing commanded Lally's left, overseeing the approaches and placing of batteries. He continued to serve under Lally in his campaigns against the British in southern India. He opposed Lally's decision to lift the siege of Tanjore (the only one in Lally's war council to do so) following the British seizure of Karikal. When Lally began to besiege Madras in December 1758, d'Estaing's division was positioned in the center of the French line. When the British made a sortie against that sector, Estaing advanced alone to reconnoiter their movements. He was surrounded by British troops, unhorsed, and twice wounded by bayonets before being taken prisoner.

Estaing was taken into Madras, where he was confined by the order of Governor George Pigot. Pigot offered to release him on parole, but Estaing refused, preferring instead to be exchanged so that he could resume fighting. The arrival of a British fleet off Madras in February 1759 convinced Estaing to accept the offer of parole, which was conditioned on his not fighting against the British in the East Indies. In May 1759 he sailed for the French colony of Isle de France.

=== French East India Company service ===
While Estaing was at Isle de France, word arrived of a prisoner exchange agreement between France and Britain. Estaing, however, was excluded from this agreement because he had been paroled before its date. While requests were forwarded to India to negotiate his inclusion in the cartel, Estaing decided to enter the service of the French East India Company, leading a naval expedition to gather resources for Isle de France. Estaing thought he would finesse his parole status by declaring himself to be a "spectator" in case the force came into conflict with the British or their allies, and permitted his second in command to lead such operations.

In command of a two-vessel company fleet (the 50-gun Condé and the frigate l'Expédition), Estaing sailed for the Persian Gulf in September 1759. From an Arab convoy captured at the end of the month, he learnt of a British ship at Muscat. In a commando operation, 50 of Condé's men entered the well-fortified harbour and boarded the ship, taking it without resistance. In their haste to depart, the men cut lines necessary for towing the ship, and alarm was eventually raised in the port. A swarm of small boats was driven off by precision fire from Condé, allowing a new line to be attached to the prize so that she could be towed out of the harbour. Estaing then destroyed the British factory at Bandar Abbas, before sailing for Sumatra. While en route he detached his accumulated prize ships, sending them to Isle de France. Estaing's success was notable: in three months he had acquired significant prizes at the expense of only five casualties (28 men died of smallpox).

After a slow crossing (retarded by calms and contrary winds), Estaing's fleet reached the coast of Sumatra in early February 1760. There he captured the British factory at Natal, which he eventually turned over to the Dutch. He sailed for the British outpost at Tappanooly (present-day Tapanuli in the Indonesian province of North Sumatra). Its garrison put up stiff resistance, fleeing into the hills when it was clear the French would be victorious. Estaing consequently decided to destroy the fortifications rather than hunt down the garrison. He next sailed for Padang, a major Dutch settlement, where he supplemented his forces with local recruits and resupplied.

He sailed for Bencoolen (now Bengkulu, the capital of the Indonesian province of Bengkulu), the main British settlement on Sumatra. The town was defended by Fort Marlborough and a garrison of 500 Europeans and local sepoys, with the potential to raise over 1,000 additional Malay militia. Although these forces were alerted to the French arrival by a ship that Estaing chased into the harbour, the first broadside directed at the fort panicked its defenders, who fled into the surrounding jungle. Estaing spent a day in pursuit of some of these troops. He used Fort Marlborough as a base to subdue the remaining lesser British settlements on the west side of Sumatra. He returned to Isle de France ten months after his departure.

Ordered back to France, Estaing boarded a westbound company ship. Just off the French coast the ship was captured by British patrols. He was imprisoned at Plymouth, charged with violating his parole, before being granted limited freedom from a house in London. He was able to successfully defend himself against the charges, and was allowed to return to France. Upon his arrival, Estaing was commissioned as field marshal, the reward for his service in the East Indies.

== Interwar years ==
=== Governor of the Leeward Islands ===
In the early months of 1762 France made preparations for a major expedition against Portuguese territories in South America. Promoted to lieutenant general of the army on 25 July 1762, Estaing was also given the rank of chef d'escadre (rear admiral) in the French Navy in recognition for his exploits, a rank lesser than that he held in the army. In order to clarify his command role in the expedition, the king formally removed him from the army and gave him the rank of lieutenant general in the navy. The expedition was called off when preliminary peace terms were agreed.

In 1764 King Louis appointed Estaing governor general of the French Leeward Islands, a post he held until 1766. Based principally in Saint-Domingue (present-day Haiti), he recruited French colonists known as Acadians to settle there. They had been deported from the French colony of Acadia by the British during the war, as they had refused to take loyalty oaths to Britain. These efforts were largely unsuccessful, as many Acadian immigrants died of tropical disease. Others sought to resettle elsewhere because of the hot climate and poor land.

=== Home service ===
Estaing returned to France in 1767. At this time he had to deal with the formal separation from his wife, which they had agreed to in writing in 1756, before his departure for India. The division of their properties was somewhat contentious, leading to court proceedings and appeals that ultimately failed to divide their estates. In 1772 Estaing was appointed naval inspector and governor at Brest, the country's principal Atlantic naval station. In 1777 he was promoted to vice admiral of the Asian and American seas (vice-amiral des mers d'Asie et d'Amérique).

== American Revolutionary War ==
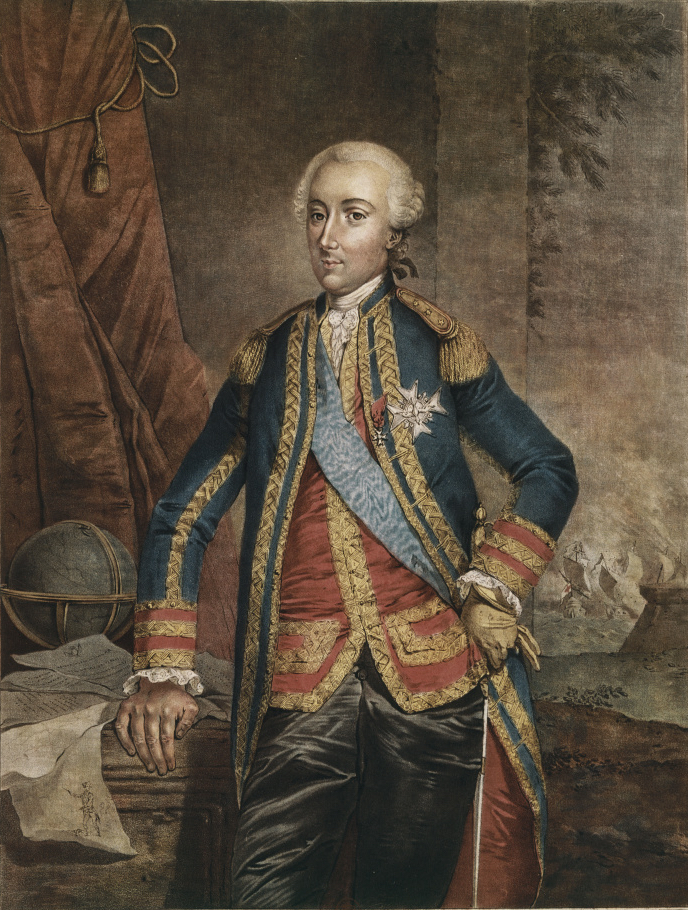
Portrait of Estaing in his admiral's uniform

At the entry of France into the American Revolutionary War in 1778, Estaing left Toulon in command of a fleet of twelve ships of the line and four frigates. He intended to assist the American colonies against Great Britain. He sailed on 13 April, and, between the 11th and 22 July, blockaded the smaller British fleet of Lord Howe at Sandy Hook, New Jersey, off the southern entrance to New York Harbour. He did not enter the harbour because his largest ships were believed to be unable to clear the bar at its mouth.

=== Newport ===
In cooperation with American commanders, Estaing planned an attack on Newport, Rhode Island, preparatory to which he compelled the British to destroy some war vessels that were in the harbor. Before the concerted attack could take place, he put to sea against the British fleet, which was under Admiral Howe. Owing to a violent storm, which arose suddenly and compelled the two fleets to separate before engaging in battle, many of his vessels were so shattered that he found it necessary to put into Boston for repairs. He sailed for the West Indies on 4 November.

=== West Indies ===
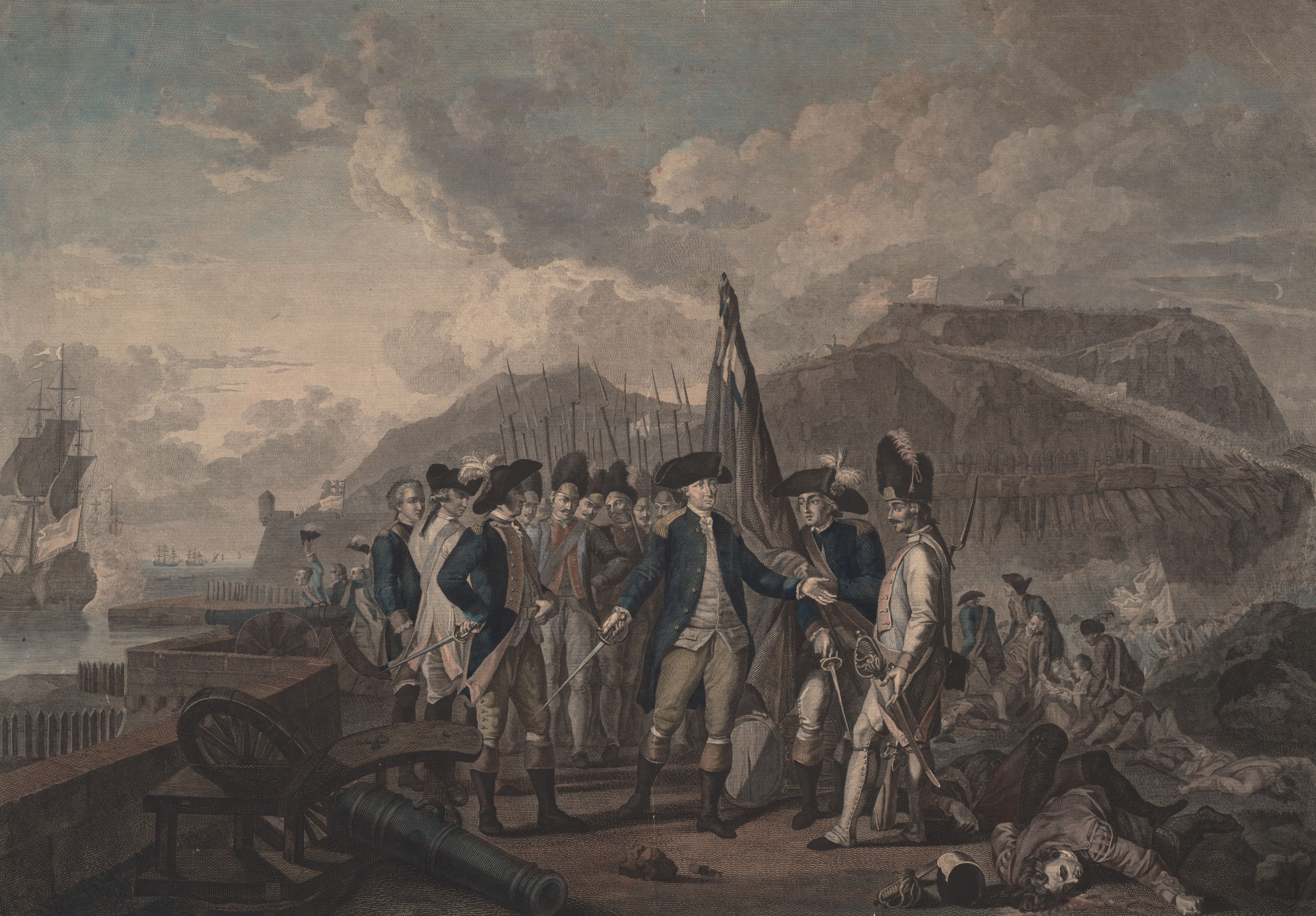
Estaing (centre) during the capture of Grenada

He arrived in the West Indies in December 1778, shortly after the British began operations to capture St. Lucia. He sailed in an attempt to relieve the place, but he was defeated in both land and naval efforts to prevent its capture. In June 1779, with his fleet reinforced by arrival of ten ships of the line commanded by Comte de Grasse, he took advantage of the temporary absence of his British opponent, Admiral John Byron, to take action against nearby British possessions. He first detached forces that captured St. Vincent on 18 June, and then set sail with his entire fleet, intending to capture Barbados. When he was unable to make progress against the prevailing westerly trade winds, he turned his sights on Grenada. On 2 July he arrived off the island, which his forces took by storm two days later.

Byron had been alerted to the capture of St. Vincent, and was sailing with a force to retake it when he learned that Estaing was at Grenada. He changed course, making all sail for Grenada, and arrived there early on 6 July. Although Estaing had been alerted to Byron's progress, and his fleet outnumbered Byron's, he still scrambled to embark soldiers and sail away from the island. Byron, unaware that Estaing had been reinforced, ordered a general chase, which resulted in a somewhat disorganized battle. Estaing refused to press his numerical advantage, and both fleets ended up retiring to their bases for repairs. In August, Estaing sailed for Savannah, Georgia, to join forces with the Americans who wanted to recapture the British-held city.

=== Siege of Savannah ===
The siege consisted of a joint Franco-American attempt to retake Savannah from 16 September 1779 to 18 October 1779, with Estaing in overall command of the combined forces. After weeks of fruitless bombardment, on 9 October 1779, a major assault against the British siege works failed. During the attack, Estaing was twice wounded. When the assault failed, Estaing lifted the siege. British forces remained in control of coastal Georgia until they withdrew near the end of the war.

== Return to France ==
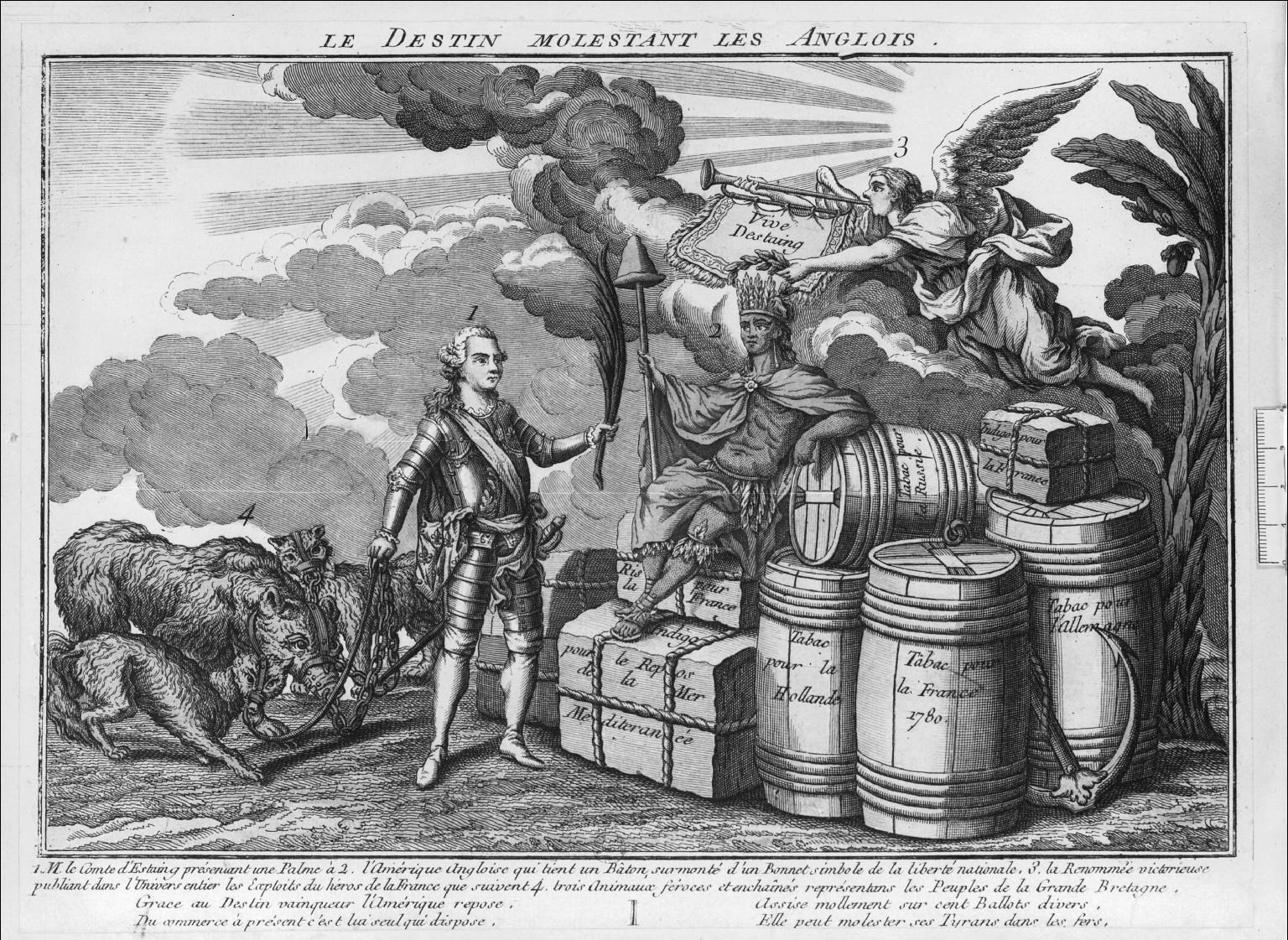
1780 cartoon of Estaing presenting a palm frond to a personification of the Americas

Estaing returned to France in 1780 on crutches. He fell into disfavour at the court, and was strongly criticised by his subordinates. Friends of Benjamin Franklin, then minister in France, jokingly suggested that the French court at Versailles should provide the United States with the names of other gifted admirals. In 1781 France sent a fleet under Admiral de Grasse, along with an expeditionary force to reinforce the Americans in Virginia. Admiral de Grasse repelled a British fleet in the Battle of the Chesapeake, holding a blockade against their forces and contributing to the surrender of Lord Cornwallis' army at Yorktown in 1781. Three years later, Estaing was placed at the head of the Franco-Spanish fleet assembled before Cádiz. The peace between the United States, Great Britain and France was signed, and no operations took place.

On 28 September 1784, the governor of Georgia John Houstoun granted four 5,000-acre (20 km^{2}) tracts of vacant land in Franklin County, Georgia to Estaing and his heirs. After the American Revolutionary War, Estaing turned his attention to politics. He was made a grandee of Spain. In 1787, he was elected to the Assembly of Notables. When the French Revolution broke out, he supported the revolutionary cause. In 1789, he was appointed as commanding general of the Versailles National Guard, and in 1792 he was promoted to admiral's rank by the National Assembly. While supporting liberal reforms, he stayed loyal to the royal family.

In the 1793 trial of Marie Antoinette, during the Reign of Terror, he testified in her favour. On this account, and because of certain friendly letters which had passed between him and the queen, he was himself brought to trial, charged with being a reactionary. He was sent to the guillotine on 28 April 1794. Before his execution, Estaing wrote, "After my head falls off, send it to the English, they will pay a good deal for it!" Both his wife Marie-Sophie Rousselot and his only child had died before him. In his moments of leisure, Estaing wrote a poem, Le Rêve (1755), a tragedy Les Thermopyles (1789), and a book on the colonies.
