= Sugères =

- Commune
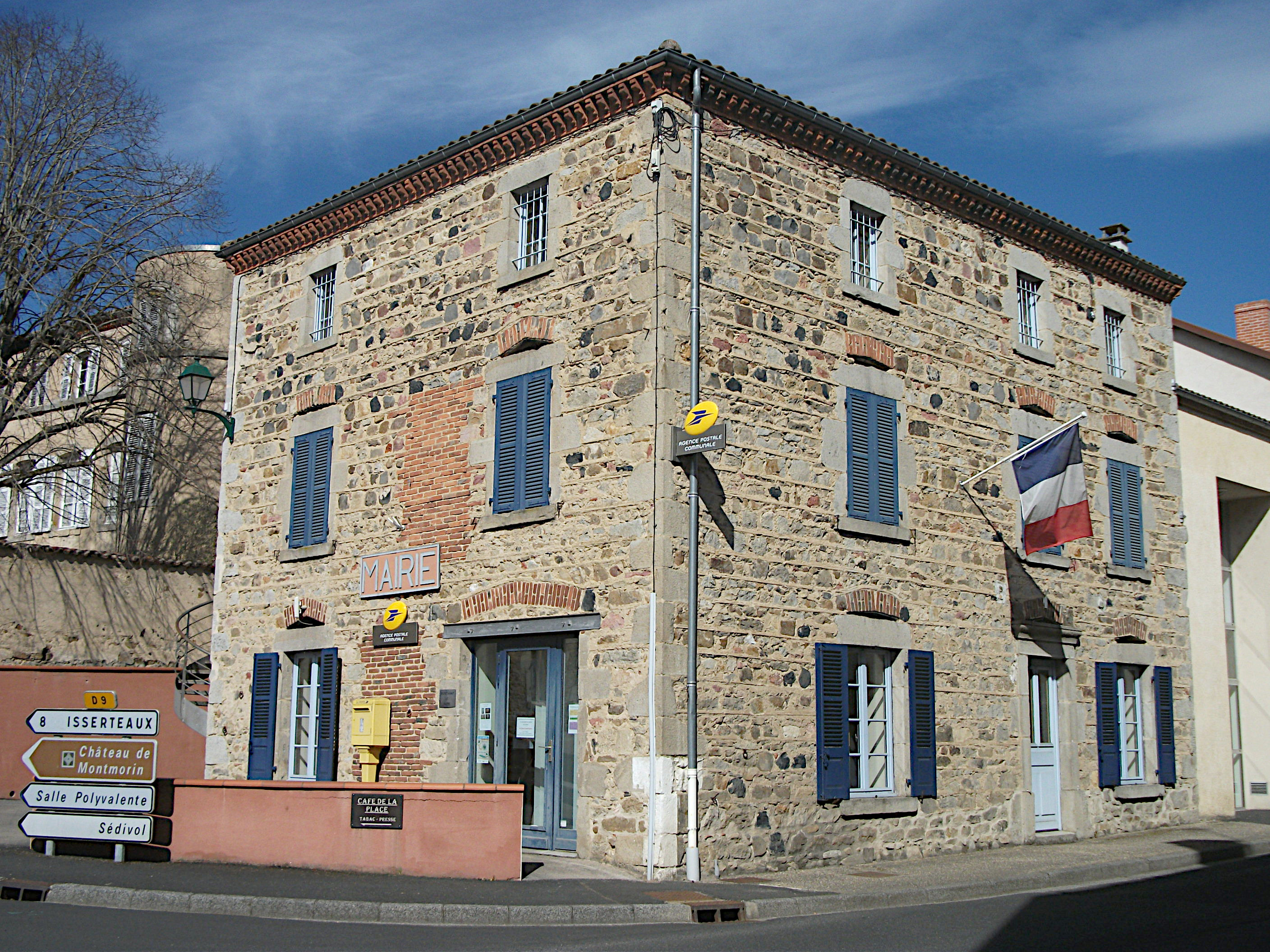
- Town hall

- Coat of arms
- Location of Sugères
- Location within France Location within Auvergne-Rhône-Alpes
- Coordinates: 45°36′10″N 3°24′32″E
- Country: France
- Region: Auvergne-Rhône-Alpes
- Department: Puy-de-Dôme
- Arrondissement: Issoire
- Canton: Brassac-les-Mines
- Intercommunality: Agglo Pays d'Issoire

Government
  - Mayor (2022–2026): Christophe Geneix
- Area^{1}: 20.64 km^{2} (7.97 sq mi)
- Elevation: 483 m (1,585 ft)
- Highest elevation: 794 m (2,605 ft)
- Lowest elevation: 447 m (1,467 ft)
- Population (2023): 648
  - Density: 31.4/km^{2} (81.3/sq mi)
- Time zone: UTC+01:00 (CET)
  - Summer (DST): UTC+02:00 (CEST)
- INSEE/Postal code: 63423 /63490
- ^{1} French Land Register data, which excludes lakes, ponds, glaciers > 1 km^{2} (0.386 sq mi or 247 acres) and river estuaries.

Sugères (French pronunciation: [syʒɛʁ]) is a commune in the Puy-de-Dôme department in Auvergne-Rhône-Alpes in central France.

== See also ==
- Communes of the Puy-de-Dôme department
