= Saint-Martin-des-Plains =

- Commune
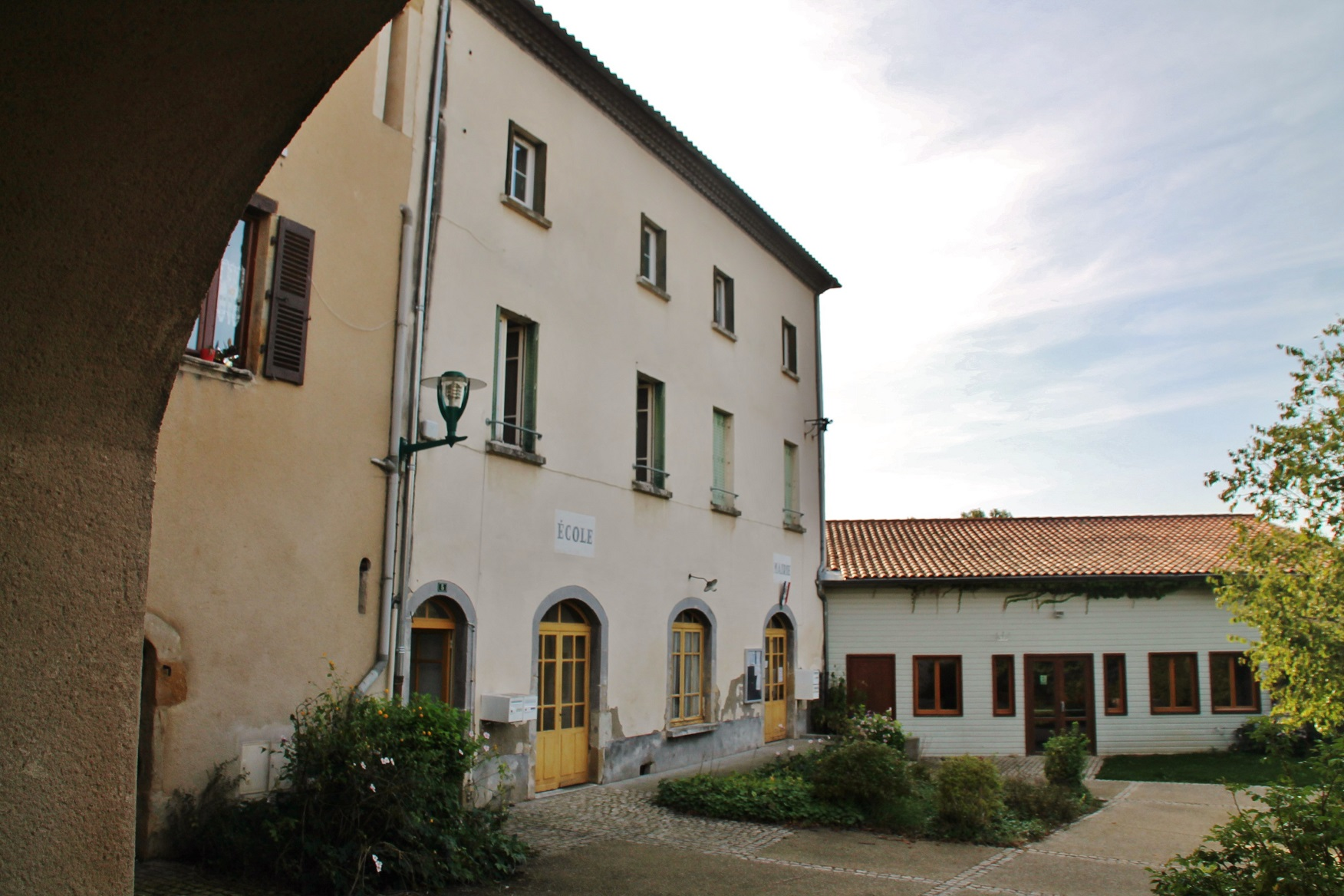
- The town hall in Saint-Martin-des-Plains
- Location of Saint-Martin-des-Plains
- Location within France Location within Auvergne-Rhône-Alpes
- Coordinates: 45°29′31″N 3°19′12″E
- Country: France
- Region: Auvergne-Rhône-Alpes
- Department: Puy-de-Dôme
- Arrondissement: Issoire
- Canton: Brassac-les-Mines
- Intercommunality: Agglo Pays d'Issoire

Government
  - Mayor (2020–2026): François Cregut
- Area^{1}: 3.87 km^{2} (1.49 sq mi)
- Highest elevation: 485 m (1,591 ft)
- Lowest elevation: 393 m (1,289 ft)
- Population (2023): 178
  - Density: 46.0/km^{2} (119/sq mi)
- Time zone: UTC+01:00 (CET)
  - Summer (DST): UTC+02:00 (CEST)
- INSEE/Postal code: 63375 /63570
- ^{1} French Land Register data, which excludes lakes, ponds, glaciers > 1 km^{2} (0.386 sq mi or 247 acres) and river estuaries.

Saint-Martin-des-Plains (French pronunciation: [sɛ̃ maʁtɛ̃ de plɛ̃]) is a commune in the Puy-de-Dôme department in Auvergne in central France.

== See also ==
- Communes of the Puy-de-Dôme department
