= Honneurs de la Cour =

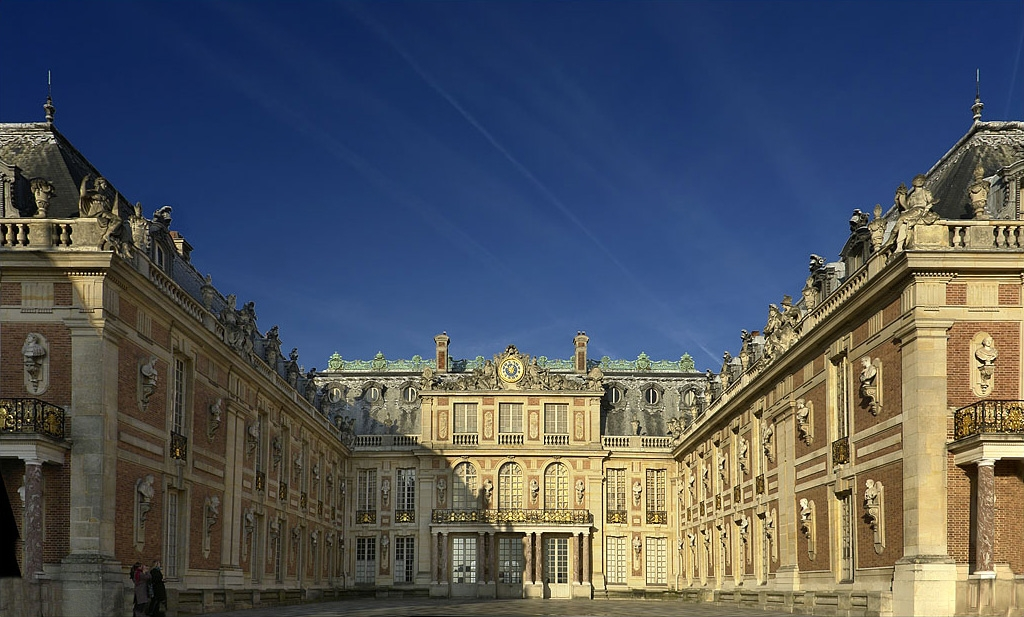
The Palace of Versailles where the formal presentations for ladies took place

The Honneurs de la Cour (Honors of the Court) were ceremonious presentations to the sovereign at the Royal Court of France that were formal for women but more casual for men. It was an honour granted only to the families of ancient nobility. It allowed them to approach the King and the Queen of France.

== Overview ==
The Honors of the Court "were the most prestigious noble honour of the 18th century, meant to honour the most ancient and representing noble families".

Formally such presentations were only granted to noble families able to prove a lineage dating back to 1400 A.D. without tracks of ennoblement. However, the king could grant exemptions to families that had been dedicated to serve him. He could also refuse a valid candidate with sufficient nobility whose family was not involved enough in the king's wars as nobles were primarily mounted warriors who had sworn allegiance to their sovereign and promised to fight for him. On a list of candidates he would then place a remark next to the name of the refused applicant saying "ne se peut" (can't be) or "attendre" (wait).

The Honors of the Court should not be mistaken for court life. The oldest nobility did not always match the court nobility. Many families living at court were descendants from less ancient nobility while many nobles of antique nobility did not stay at court. Moreover, life at the Versailles Court was expensive and many were unable to afford it.

The nobleman who was granted the presentation would follow a royal hunt on board of one of the king's carriages. At that point he would be casually introduced to the king. A noblewoman's presentation was much more formal, taking place during a specific ceremony.

From 1715 to 1790, 942 families were granted the Honors of the Court; 880 of them were French. François Bluche, who studied the royal genealogical archives, said that among the 942 families "462 were able to prove a noble lineage dating back to 1400, if excluding sovereign houses and foreign nobles who, unlike one can think, made up more than half of the French nobleman received at Court". He has limited his work to a list of 43 Houses especially flattered by the King's archive, these 43 families are considered of major regional or national importance and members of the highest 18th century nobility.

According to Régis Valette only 280 of the 880 French families who were granted the Honors of the Court still remain today.

== List of families who were granted the Honneurs de la Cour ==
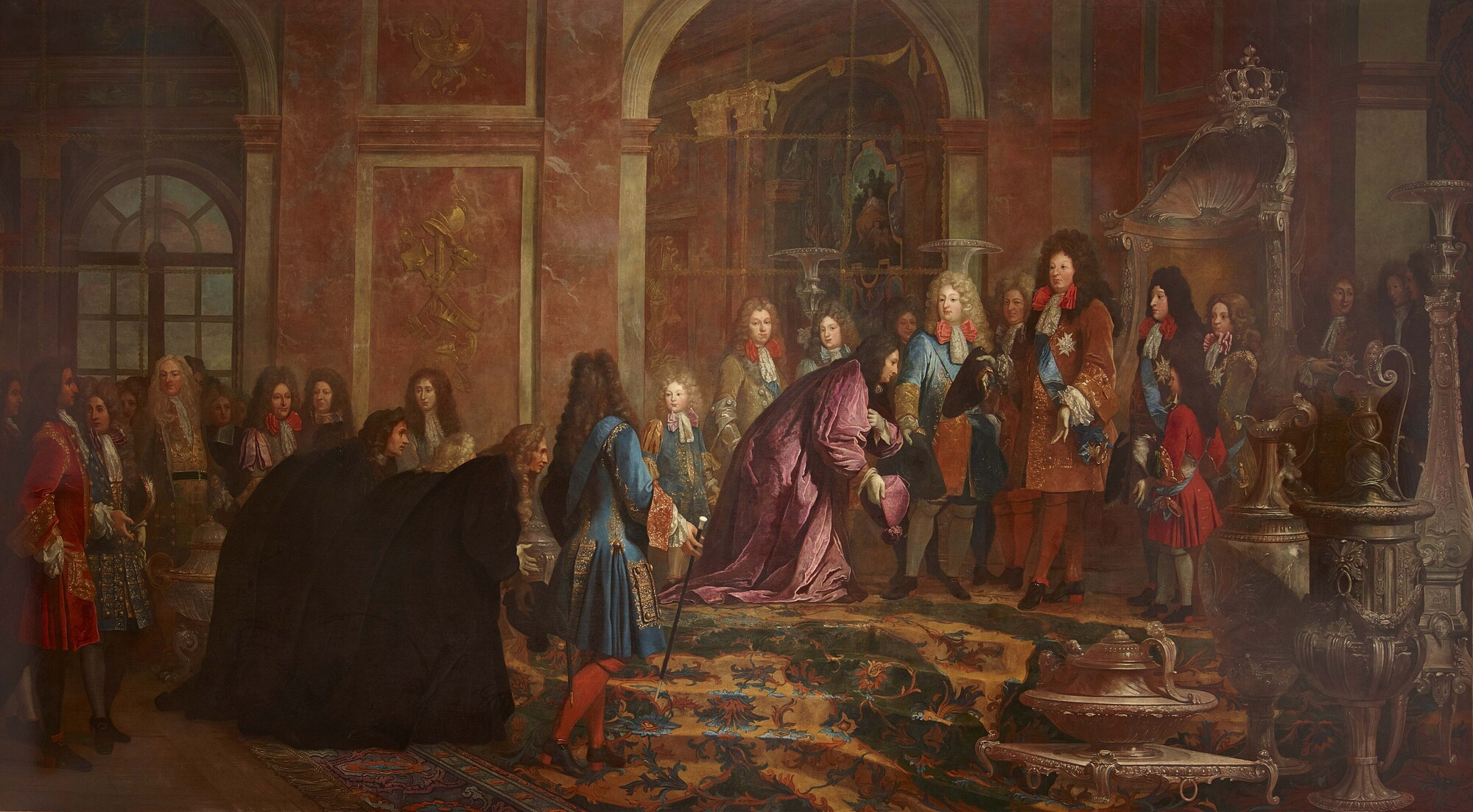
The 10-year-old Duke of Chartres in red on the right; the scene depicts the Doge of Genoa at Versailles on the 15 May 1685.

The following table provides an incomplete list of families who were granted the Honors of the Court, including dates (when available) and sources. The ones listed by François Bluche, considered the most prominent French noble families of the 18th century, are marked with bold script.

Name	Dates	Sources
d'Arenberg	1749, 1767, 1771, 1774, 1776 et 1785	Valette, Piot
de Béon		Bluche
de Bourbon-Busset	1753, 1767, 1772 and 1773	Valette, Piot
de Broglie	1746, 1747, 1750, 1752, 1753, 1754, 1756, 1770, 1771, 1779, 1782, 1785 and 1786	Valette, Piot
de Butler and de Butler d'Ormond	1747	Valette, Piot
de Chabannes	1759, 1760, 1782, 1784 and 1787	Bluche, Valette
de Chabot	1778	Valette
de Chastellux	1765, 1768, 1773 and 1787	Bluche, Piot, Valette
de Choiseul	1733	Bluche, Valette
de Clermont-Tonnerre	12 times	Bluche, Valette
de Croismare	1775, 1783, 1785	De Magny, M. (1844)
de Colbert	1748, 1758, 1759, 1763, 1764, 1768, 1770, 1772, 1778, 1782 and 1787	Valette
de Coucy	1776	Bluche, Jougla (t. 3, n° 11398)
de Croÿ		Valette
Diesbach de Belleroche	1773	Valette, Piot
de Drée	1782 and 1783	Valette, Piot
de Durfort and de Durfort-Civrac	before 1732, and 22 times between 1737 and 1788	Bluche, Valette, Piot
d'Estaing	1784 and 1785	Bluche
de Faucigny-Lucinge	1785 and 1787	Valette, Piot
de Ficquelmont	1777 and 1789	Bluche, Valette
de Foucauld (de Pontbriand and de Malembert)	1765, 1769 and 1788	Valette, Piot
de Gironde	1770 and 1779	Valette
de Gontaut-Biron		Bluche, Valette
de Gouffier		Bluche
de Gramont		Valette
d'Harcourt		Valette
d'Harville		Valette
de la Croix de Castries	1744, 1753, 1776 and 1786	Valette
de La Rochefoucauld		Bluche, Valette
de Las Casas	dates	Valette
de La Tremoïlle		Bluche
de Mancini	dates	Pauchet
de Mérode	dates	Valette
de Montaigu	dates	Valette
de Montalembert	dates	Valette
de Montesquiou-Fezensac	dates	Valette
de Montmorency		Bluche, Valette
de Noailles		Bluche, Valette
de Polignac		Bluche, Valette
de Rochechouart, de Rochechouart de Mortemart	1732, 1738, 1751, 1752, 1756, 1757, 1764, 1772, 1773, 1774, 1776, 1779, 1780 and 1783	Bluche, Valette
de Rohan		Bluche
de Rougé	dates	Valette
de Sabran		Bluche
de Sade	dates	Valette
de Ségur	dates	Valette
de Vogüé	dates	Valette

== See also ==
- Court of Versailles
- Etiquette
