= Ravel, Puy-de-Dôme =

Ravel
- Commune
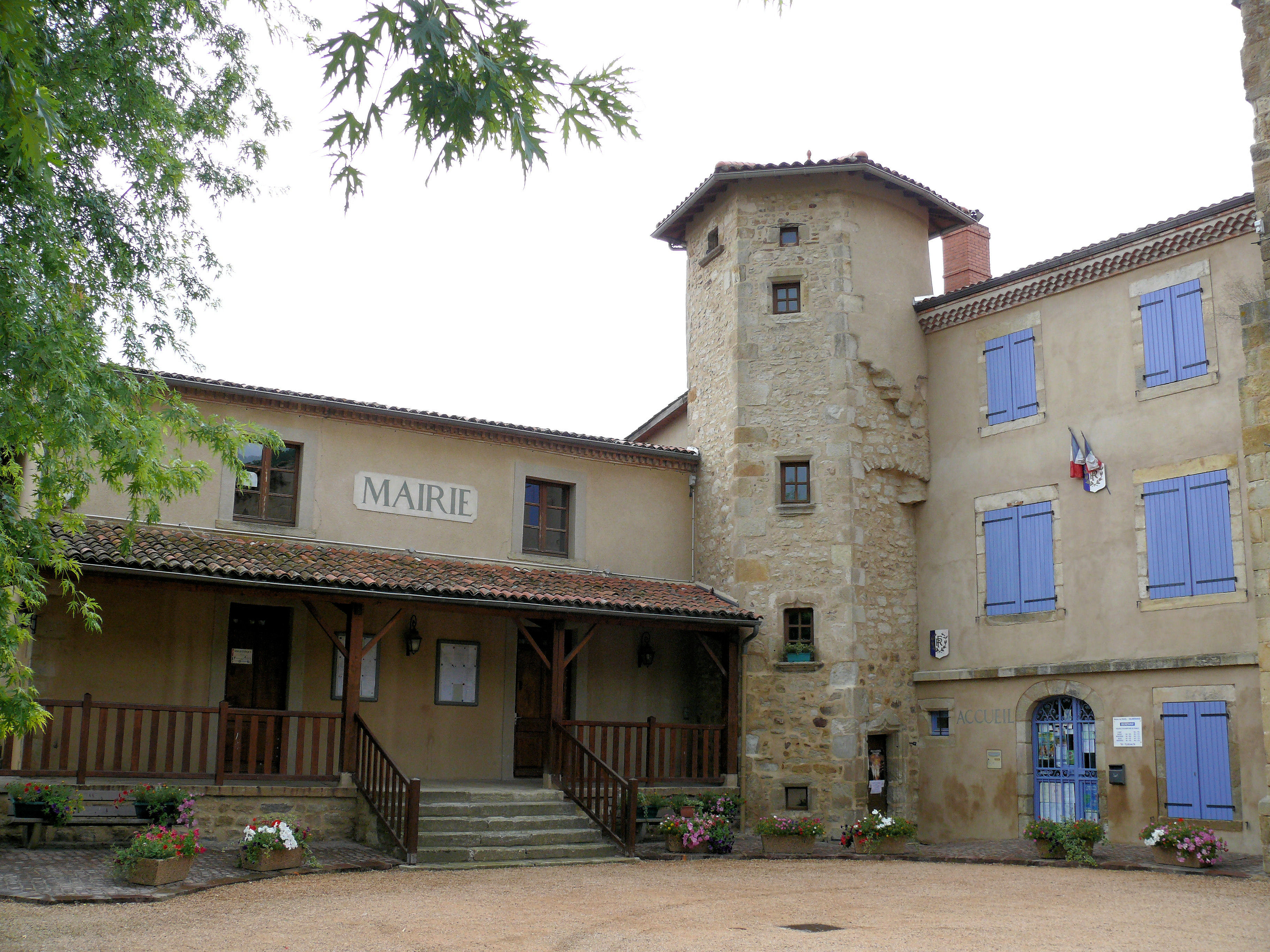
- Town hall
- Location of Ravel
- Location within France Location within Auvergne-Rhône-Alpes
- Coordinates: 45°46′45″N 3°23′47″E
- Country: France
- Region: Auvergne-Rhône-Alpes
- Department: Puy-de-Dôme
- Arrondissement: Thiers
- Canton: Lezoux
- Intercommunality: Entre Dore et Allier

Government
  - Mayor (2020–2026): Michelle Cierge
- Area^{1}: 10.03 km^{2} (3.87 sq mi)
- Elevation: 380 m (1,250 ft)
- Highest elevation: 470 m (1,540 ft)
- Lowest elevation: 317 m (1,040 ft)
- Population (2023): 739
  - Density: 73.7/km^{2} (191/sq mi)
- Time zone: UTC+01:00 (CET)
  - Summer (DST): UTC+02:00 (CEST)
- INSEE/Postal code: 63296 /63190
- ^{1} French Land Register data, which excludes lakes, ponds, glaciers > 1 km^{2} (0.386 sq mi or 247 acres) and river estuaries.

Ravel is a commune in the Puy-de-Dôme department in Auvergne in central France.

== See also ==
- Château de Ravel
- Communes of the Puy-de-Dôme department
