= Parentignat =

- Commune
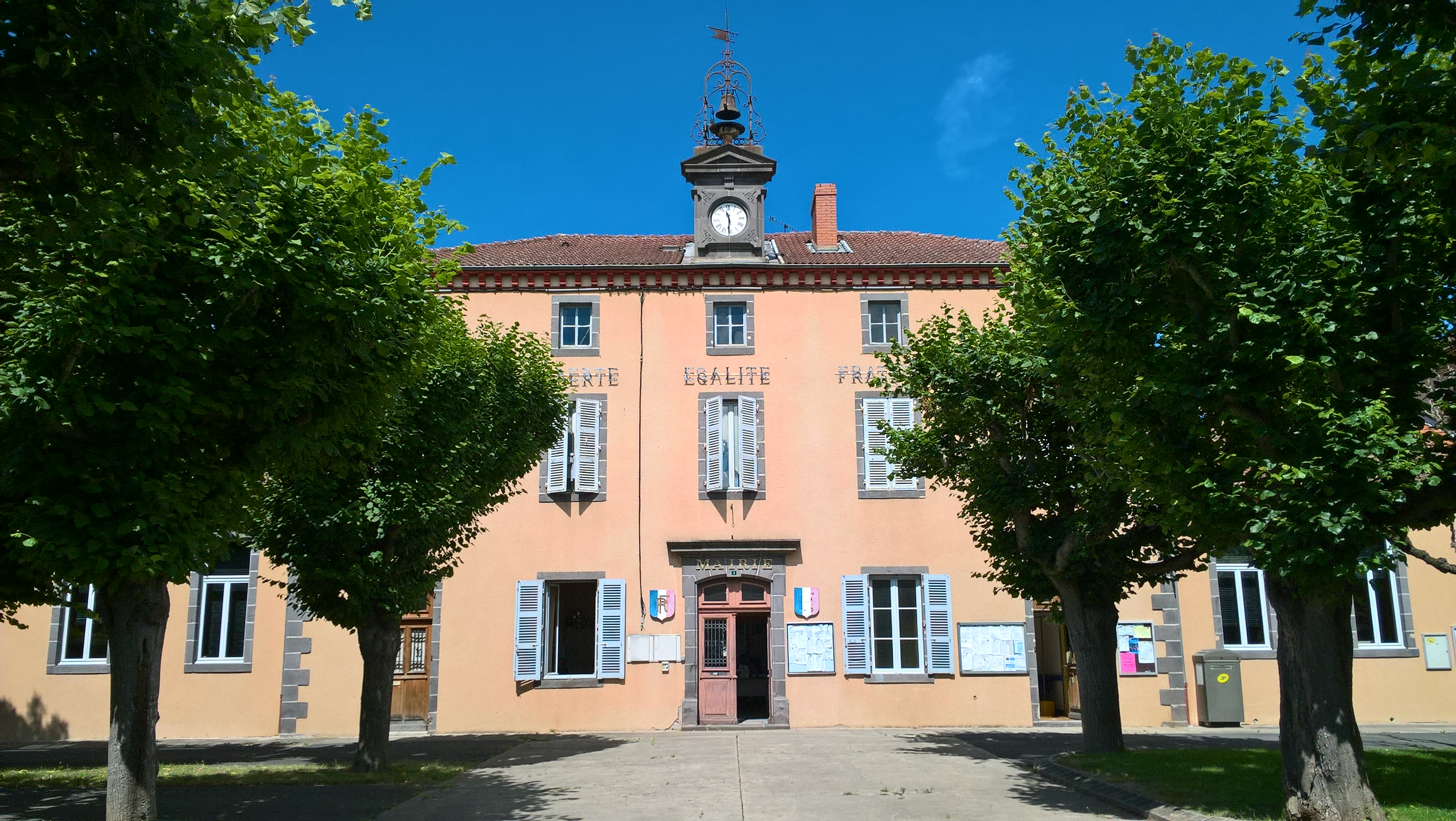
- The town hall in Parentignat
- Location of Parentignat
- Location within France Location within Auvergne-Rhône-Alpes
- Coordinates: 45°32′02″N 3°17′28″E
- Country: France
- Region: Auvergne-Rhône-Alpes
- Department: Puy-de-Dôme
- Arrondissement: Issoire
- Canton: Brassac-les-Mines
- Intercommunality: Agglo Pays d'Issoire

Government
  - Mayor (2026–32): Éric Bayard
- Area^{1}: 3.71 km^{2} (1.43 sq mi)
- Elevation: 374 m (1,227 ft)
- Highest elevation: 456 m (1,496 ft)
- Lowest elevation: 367 m (1,204 ft)
- Population (2023): 480
  - Density: 130/km^{2} (340/sq mi)
- Time zone: UTC+01:00 (CET)
  - Summer (DST): UTC+02:00 (CEST)
- INSEE/Postal code: 63270 /63500
- ^{1} French Land Register data, which excludes lakes, ponds, glaciers > 1 km^{2} (0.386 sq mi or 247 acres) and river estuaries.

Parentignat (French pronunciation: [paʁɑ̃tiɲa]) is a commune in the Puy-de-Dôme department in Auvergne in central France.

== See also ==
- Communes of the Puy-de-Dôme department
