= Maison du Chamarier =

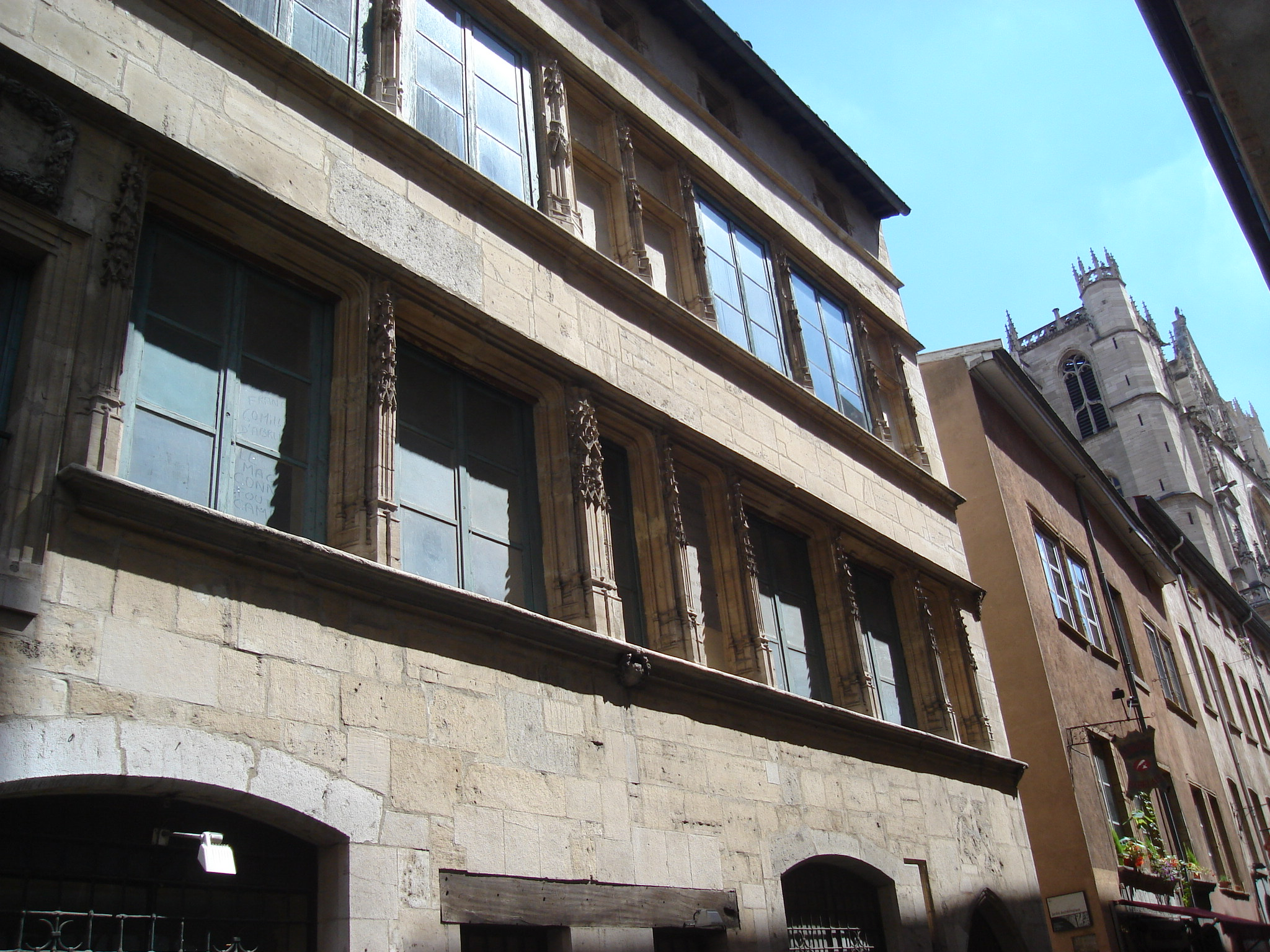
- Interactive map of the Maison du Chamarier area

General information
- Architectural style: Renaissance
- Location: 5th arrondissement of Lyon, Lyon, France
- Coordinates: 45°45′42″N 4°49′38″E
- Completed: 1498

The Maison du Chamarier, also known as Hôtel d'Estaing, is a house at 37 rue Saint-Jean in the 5th arrondissement of Lyon, at the corner of Rue de la Bombarde. It was built in 1498 but the ancient ruins are from the thirteenth century. From Latin cameriarus, the word "Chamarier" means the superintendent of the finances of the bishop of the Lyon Cathedral. He also owns the keys to the gates of the enclosure canonical. From the fifteenth century, he gathered the taxes collected during the fairs.

== History and architecture ==
In the thirteenth century, the first house was built inside the cloister of St. John, just on the wall built during the episcopate of Guichard de Pontigny between 1165 and 1180. Redesigned in the fourteenth - fifteenth centuries, this building was rebuilt in the sixteenth century by François d'Estaing. The wells in the yard is attributed to Philibert de L'Orme. The Marquise de Sévigné lived here when she was in Lyon.

In the nineteenth century, the house was converted into apartments. As all of Saint Jean quarter, it starts to deteriorate gradually. On 15 September 1943, the building was classified monument historique. It has subsequently been renovated under the leadership of the association "Renaissance du Vieux Lyon" and after the decision of Denis Trouxe, then deputy mayor under the tenure of Mayor Raymond Barre.

It was the first Renaissance styled home of the quarter. The Gothic styled spiral staircase has a large size and ornamentation. The entrance to the tower where the stairway is part, is surmounted by a canopy adorned with a pinnacle turrets similar to those entries of Gothic churches.
