= Murol =

- Commune
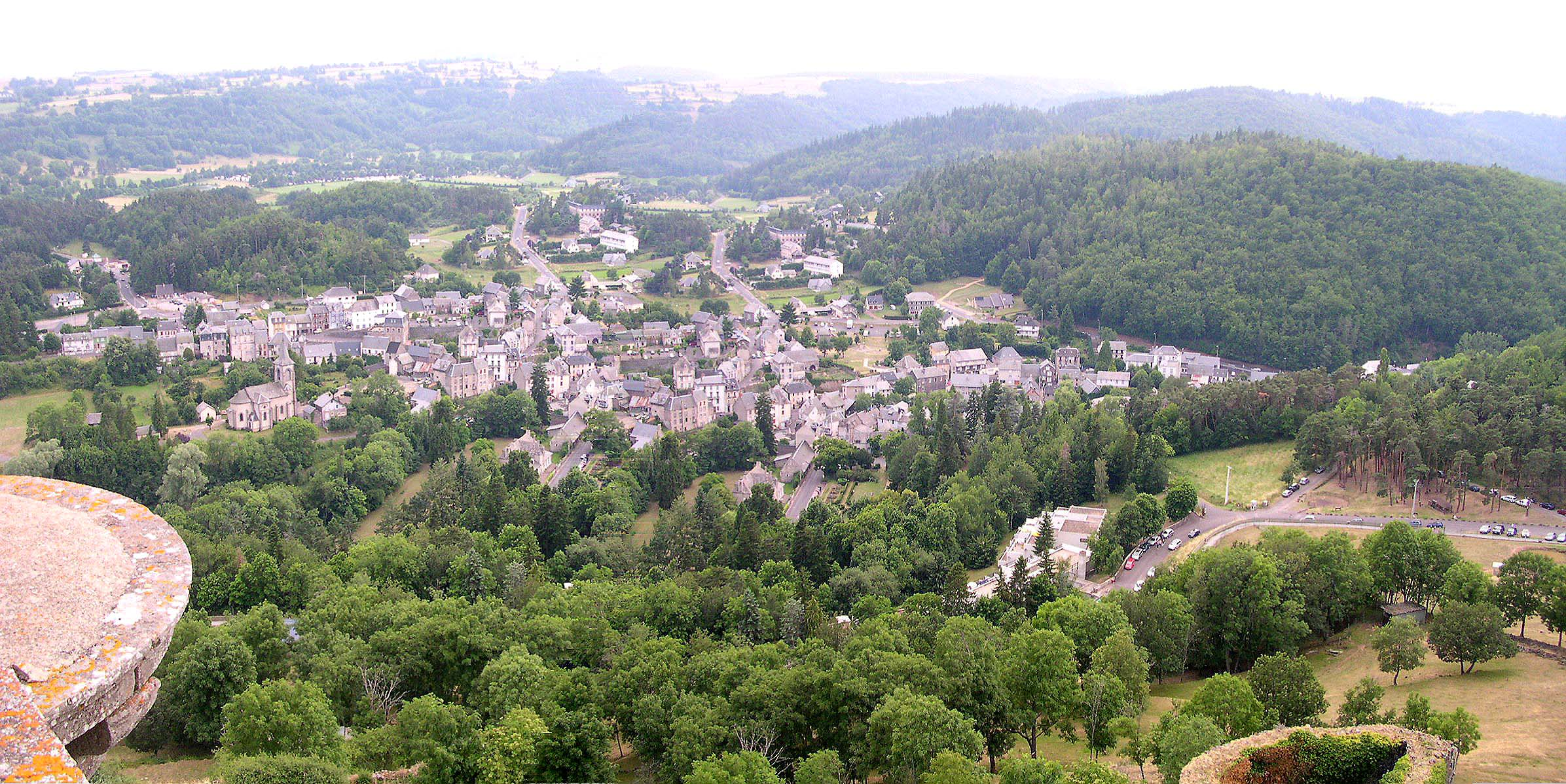
- View of Murol

- Coat of arms
- Location of Murol
- Location within France Location within Auvergne-Rhône-Alpes
- Coordinates: 45°34′26″N 2°56′38″E
- Country: France
- Region: Auvergne-Rhône-Alpes
- Department: Puy-de-Dôme
- Arrondissement: Issoire
- Canton: Le Sancy
- Intercommunality: CC Massif du Sancy

Government
  - Mayor (2020–2026): Sébastien Gouttebel
- Area^{1}: 15.05 km^{2} (5.81 sq mi)
- Elevation: 840 m (2,760 ft)
- Highest elevation: 1,500 m (4,900 ft)
- Lowest elevation: 785 m (2,575 ft)
- Population (2023): 672
  - Density: 44.7/km^{2} (116/sq mi)
- Time zone: UTC+01:00 (CET)
  - Summer (DST): UTC+02:00 (CEST)
- INSEE/Postal code: 63247 /63790
- ^{1} French Land Register data, which excludes lakes, ponds, glaciers > 1 km^{2} (0.386 sq mi or 247 acres) and river estuaries.

Murol (French pronunciation: [myʁɔl]) is a commune in the French department of Puy-de-Dôme, Auvergne, France.

It is best known for its Château de Murol.

== See also ==
- Communes of the Puy-de-Dôme department
