= Dauzat-sur-Vodable =

- Commune
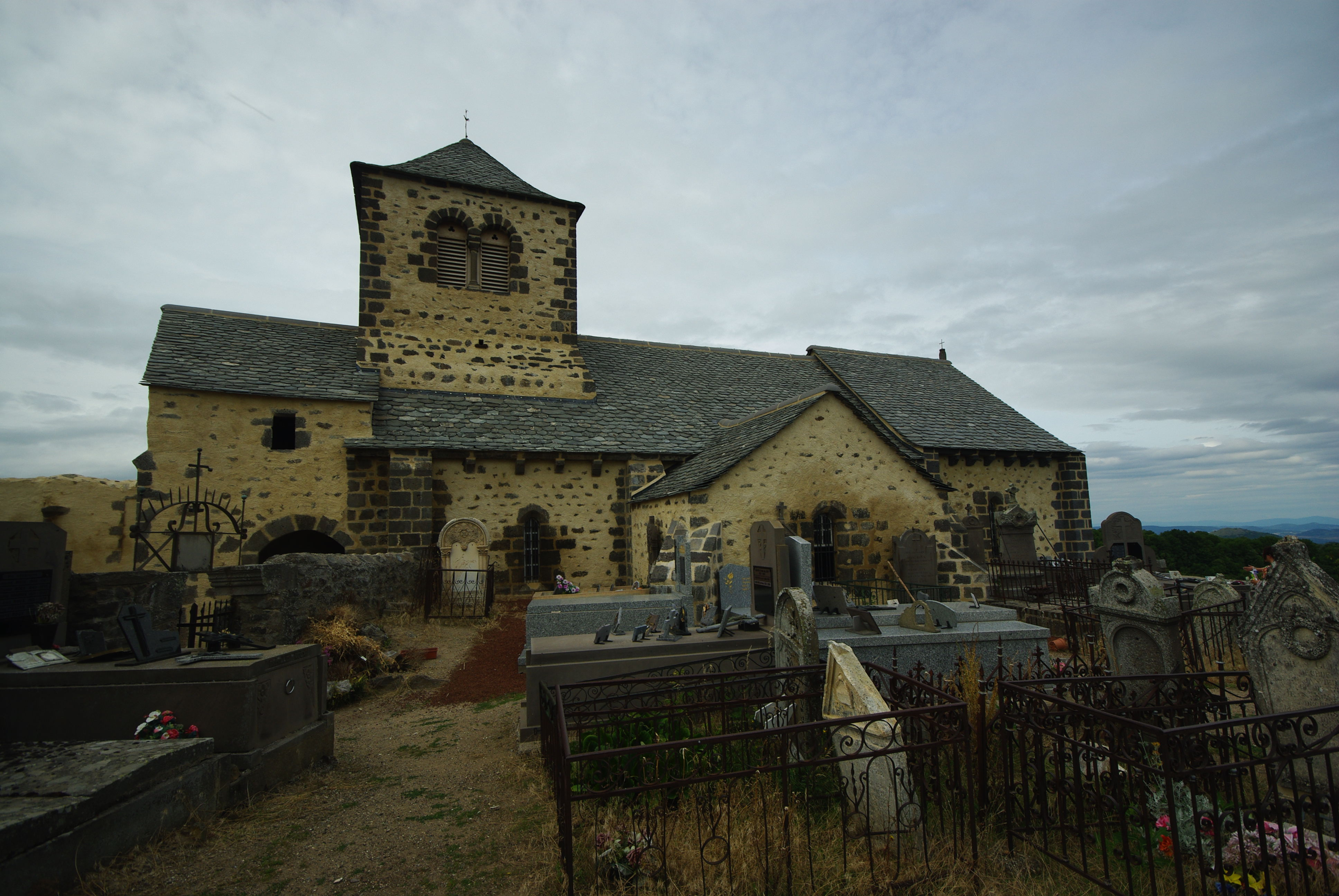
- The church in Dauzat-sur-Vodable
- Location of Dauzat-sur-Vodable
- Location within France Location within Auvergne-Rhône-Alpes
- Coordinates: 45°28′59″N 3°05′59″E
- Country: France
- Region: Auvergne-Rhône-Alpes
- Department: Puy-de-Dôme
- Arrondissement: Issoire
- Canton: Brassac-les-Mines
- Intercommunality: Agglo Pays d'Issoire

Government
  - Mayor (2026–32): Isabelle Mourgue
- Area^{1}: 14.99 km^{2} (5.79 sq mi)
- Highest elevation: 1,252 m (4,108 ft)
- Lowest elevation: 677 m (2,221 ft)
- Population (2023): 70
  - Density: 4.7/km^{2} (12/sq mi)
- Time zone: UTC+01:00 (CET)
  - Summer (DST): UTC+02:00 (CEST)
- INSEE/Postal code: 63134 /63340
- ^{1} French Land Register data, which excludes lakes, ponds, glaciers > 1 km^{2} (0.386 sq mi or 247 acres) and river estuaries.

Dauzat-sur-Vodable (French pronunciation: [doza syʁ vɔdabl], literally Dauzat on Vodable; Occitan: Dausat) is a commune in the Puy-de-Dôme department in Auvergne-Rhône-Alpes in central France.

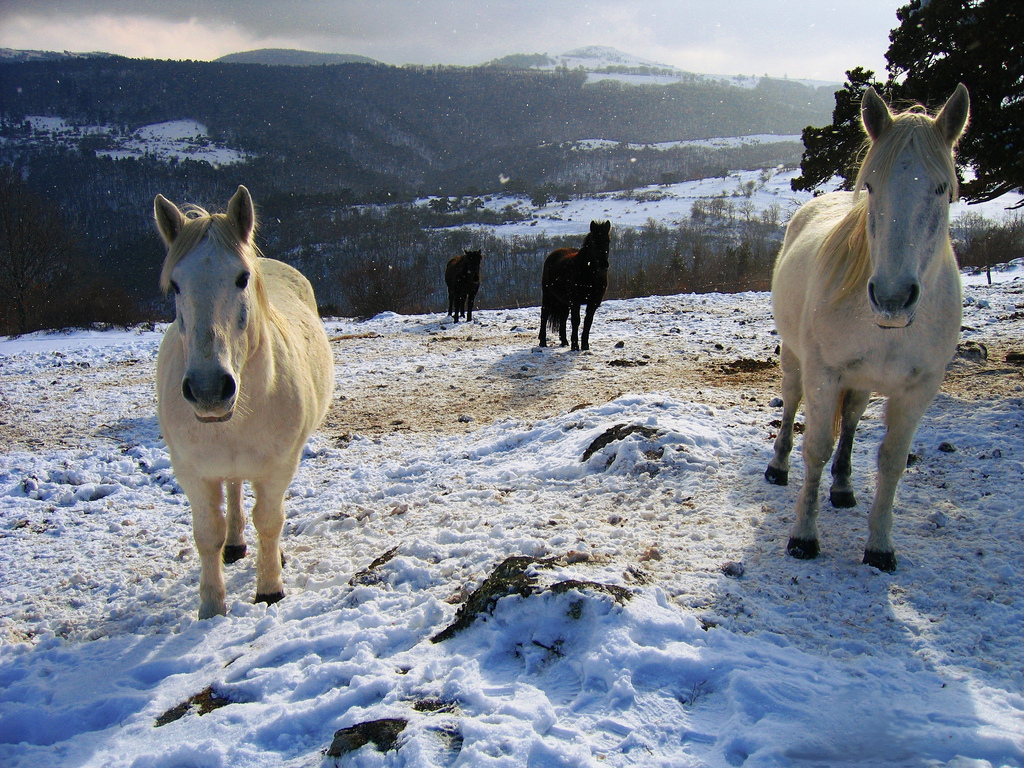
at Puy-de-Dôme

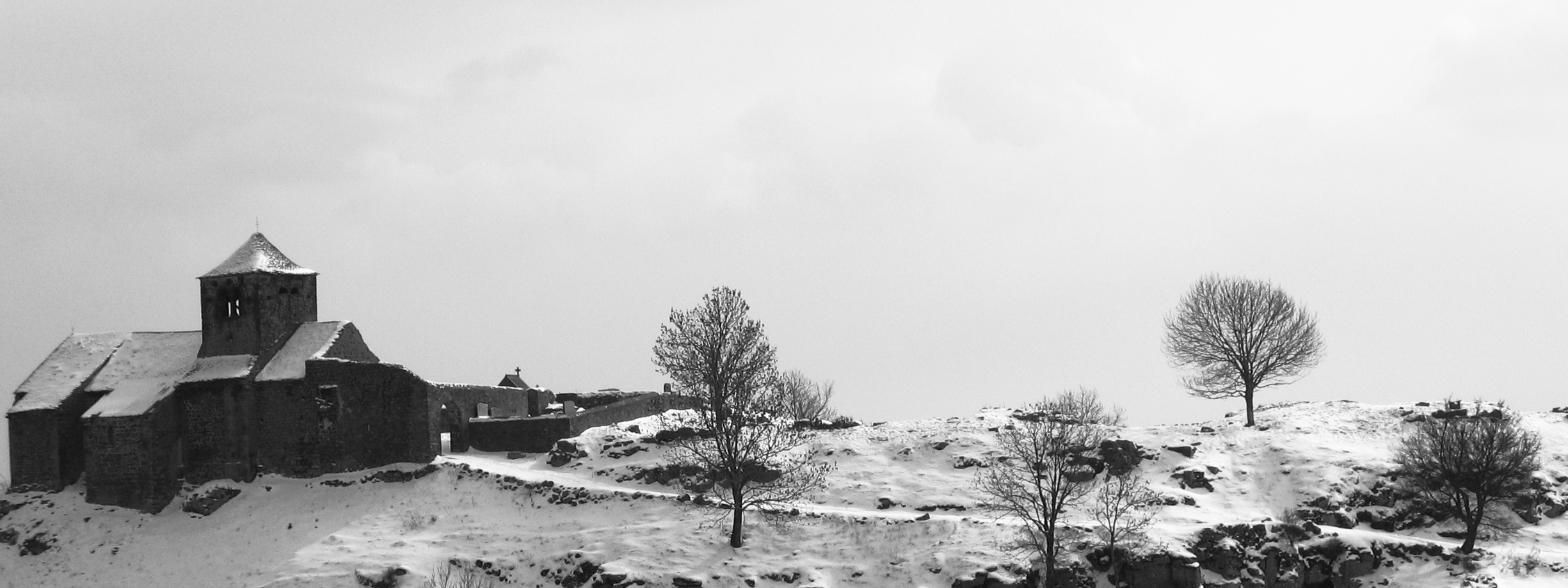
Church
