= Château de Murol =

Castle overlooking the town of Murol in France

Coordinates: 45°34′42″N 2°56′43″E

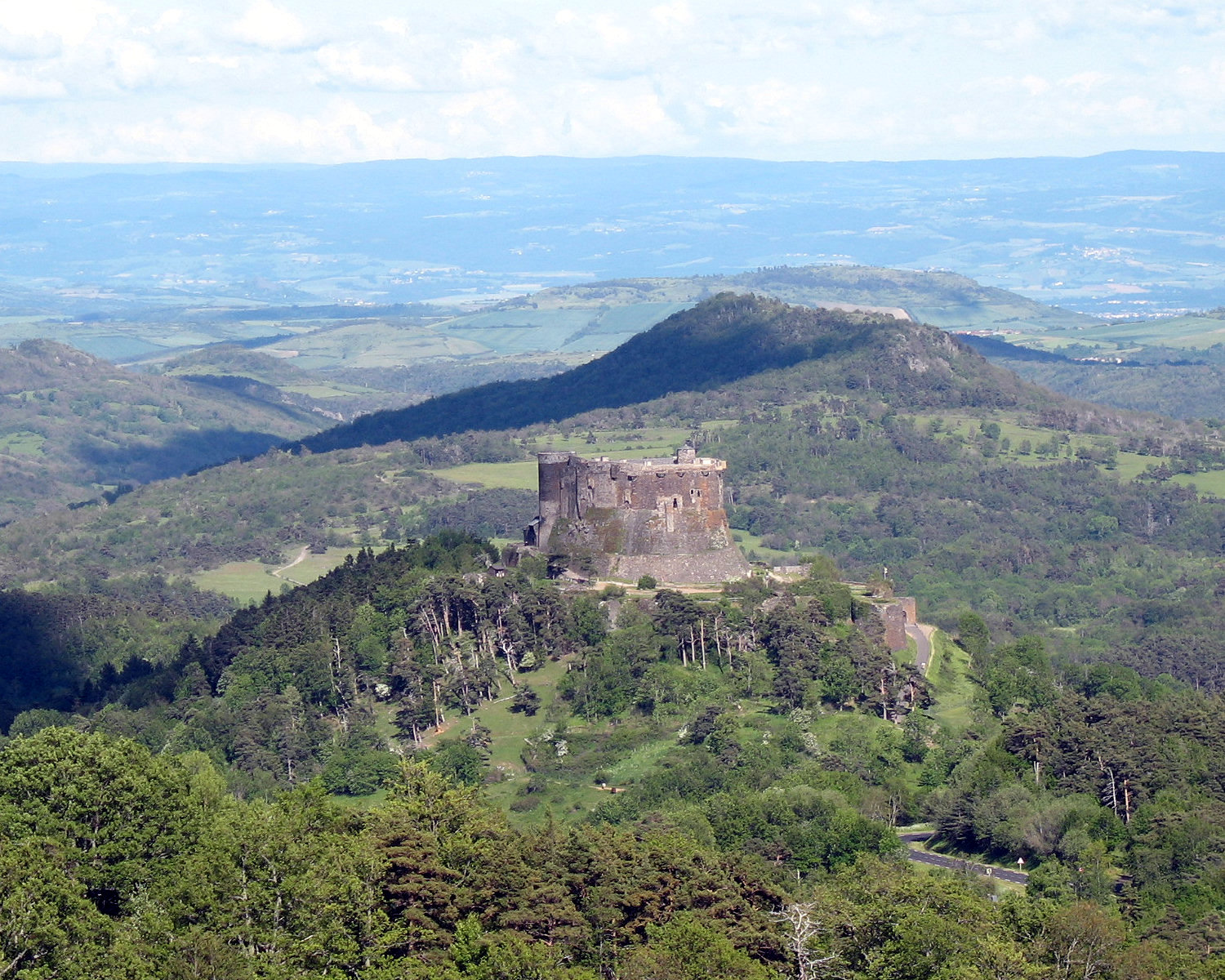
Château de Murol

The Château de Murol is a castle overlooking the town of Murol in the département of Puy-de-Dôme in the Auvergne-Rhône-Alpes région, France.

== History ==
The first castle was built on a basalt outcrop in the 12th century to provide surveillance over several roads. It was reinforced in the 14th century by Guillaume de Sam, who built the keep, a second chapel and the eastern buildings.

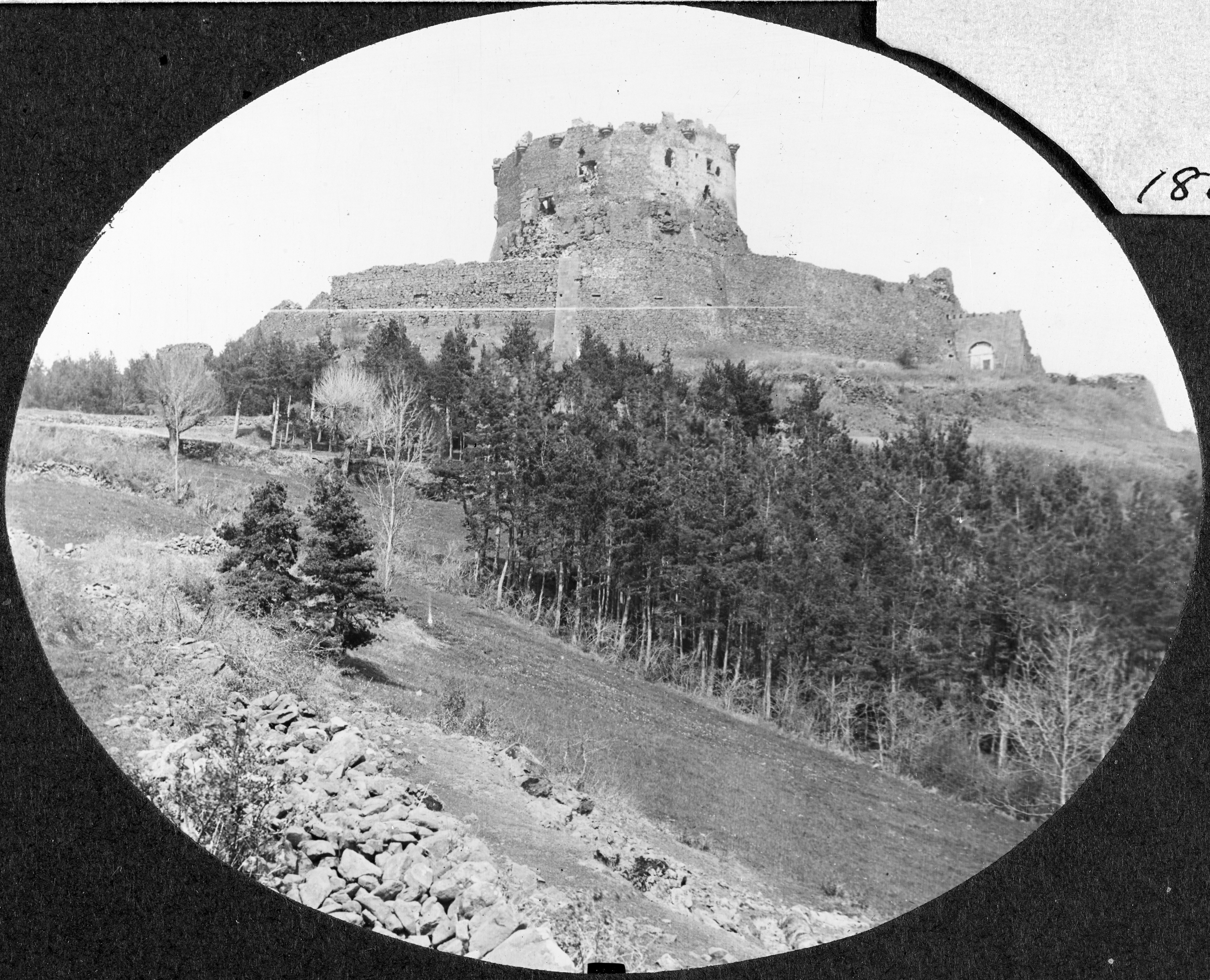
The château in 1885

The castle became the property of the d'Estaing family when the sole heir, Jehanne de Murol, married Gaspard d'Estaing in the 15th century. The castle was richly decorated and, under François I d'Estaing, in the 16th century it was surrounded by a huge curtain wall with towers. Emerging unscathed from the sieges during the Catholic League, the castle was transformed when Jean d'Estaing built a more comfortable Renaissance pavilion at the foot of the inner castle. The castle was later abandoned.

Although he ordered the destruction of numerous castles and fortresses, Richelieu spared Murol thanks to the prestige of the d'Estaing family and their influence in the French court. After being used as a prison for many years, it eventually became a bandits' hideout during the Revolution. During the 19th century, it fell to ruin and local inhabitants pillaged the site for stone; its classification as an historical monument (it has been listed as a monument historique by the French Ministry of Culture since 1889) helped to save it and it is now the property of the commune of Murol.

== Present day ==
The castle has been developed as an important tourist site in recent years. The Compagnons de Gabriel organise guided tours and son et lumière shows designed to give a genuine view of life in a medieval castle. Displays of medieval martial arts are given in the lower courtyard.

Entrance through the outer curtain wall is by a fortified gatehouse in the south. The Renaissance Pavilion is in the outer courtyard. Though dilipated, the facade still shows ancient mouldings and pilasters. The inner castle, to the north, boasts 10 m (33 ft) high walls, built on a basalt base. Next to the keep, connected to a smaller tower by a curtain wall, are the two chapels, the older from the 13th century and the other 15th century. A ramp leads to a door, decorated with the arms of the Murol and d'Estaing families, that gives access to the inner courtyard. Still visible are the remains of a gallery, the kitchen, a bakery and several outbuildings.

The curtain walls can be reached up a spiral staircase and it possible to walk all round the ramparts. From the top of the keep the view extends over the town of Murol, the Couze Valley, Lake Chambon, Monts Dore and the Tartaret volcano.

== Murol in literature ==
The ruins of the Château de Murol were described by Guy de Maupassant in his short story "Humble drame" from Contes du jour at de la nuit (1885):

«Le lendemain, à la nuit tombante, j'arrivai au château de Murol. La vieille forteresse, tour géante debout sur son pic au milieu d'une large vallée, au croisement de trois vallons, se dresse sur le ciel, brune, crevassée, bosselée, mais ronde, depuis son large pied circulaire jusqu'aux tourelles croulantes de son faîte.
Elle surprend plus qu'aucune autre ruine par son énormité simple, sa majesté, son air antique puissant et grave. Elle est là, seule, haute comme une montagne, reine morte, mais toujours la reine des vallées couchées sous elle. On y monte par une pente plantée de sapin]s, on y pénètre par une porte étroite, on s'arrête au pied des murs, dans la première enceinte au-dessus du pays entier.
Là-dedans, des salles tombées, des escaliers égrenés, des trous inconnus, des souterrains, des oubliettes, des murs coupés au milieu, des voûtes tenant on ne sait comment, un dédale de pierres, de crevasses où pousse l'herbe, où glissent des bêtes.
J'étais seul, rôdant par cette ruine. »

"The next day, at nightfall, I came to the chateau of Murol. The old fortress, an enormous tower standing on a peak in the midst of a large valley, where three valleys intersect, rears its brown, uneven, cracked surface into the sky; it is round, from its large circular base to the crumbling turrets on its pinnacles.
It astonishes the eye more than any other ruin by its simple mass, its majesty, its grave and imposing air of antiquity. It stands there, alone, high as a mountain, a dead queen, but still the queen of the valleys stretched out beneath it. You go up by a slope planted with firs, then you enter a narrow gate, and stop at the foot of the walls, in the first inclosure, in full view of the entire country.
Inside there are ruined halls, crumbling stairways, unknown cavities, dungeons, walls cut through in the middle, vaulted roofs held up one knows not how, and a mass of stones and crevices, overgrown with grass, where animals glide in and out.
I was exploring this ruin alone."

The castle was also described by George Sand in her novel Jean de la Roche (1859).

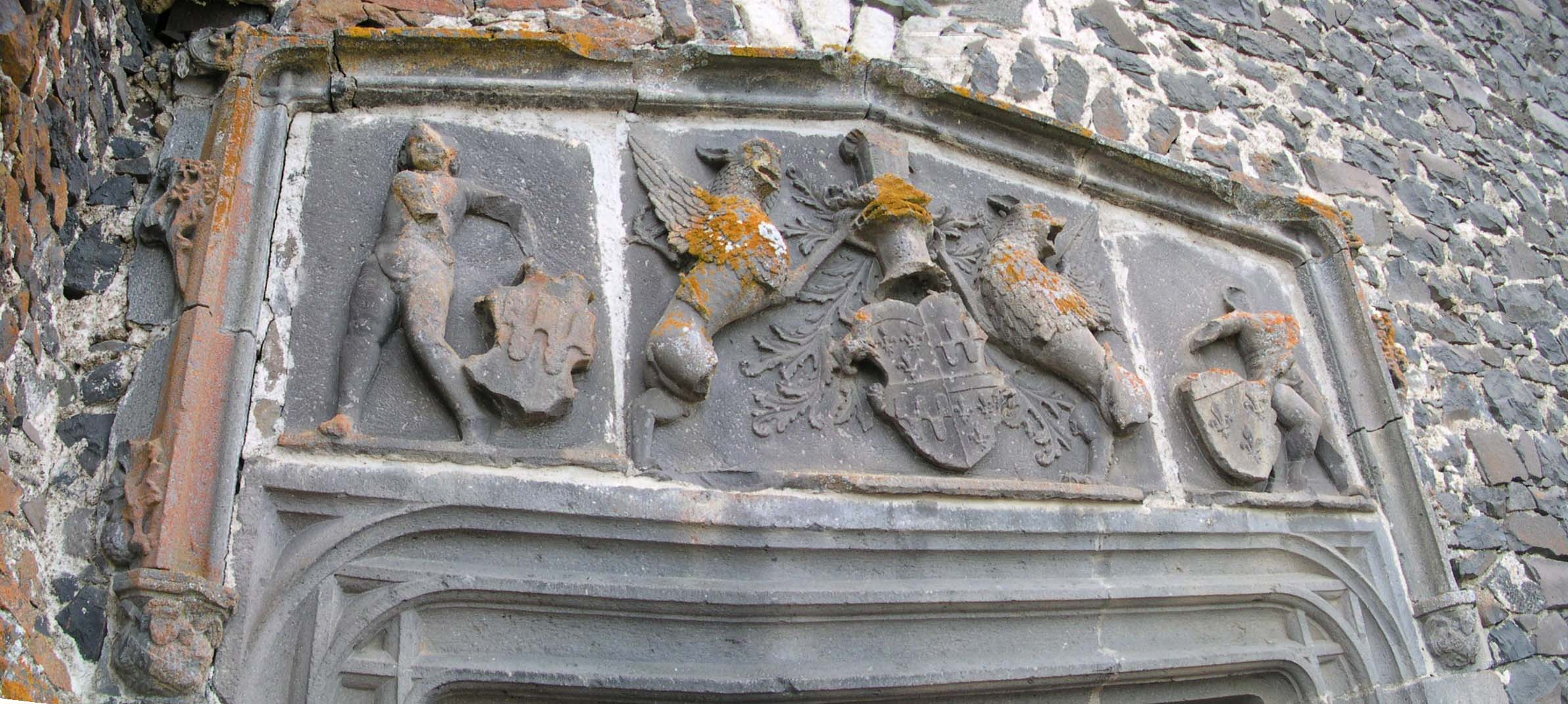
Lintel above entrance to courtyard

== See also ==
- List of castles in France
