= French ship Sagittaire (1761) =

History

France
- Name: Sagittaire
- Ordered: 18 October 1759
- Builder: Toulon
- Laid down: January 1759
- Launched: 8 August 1761
- In service: March 1762
- Fate: Sold 1790

General characteristics
- Displacement: 1800 tonneaux
- Tons burthen: 1000 port tonneaux
- Length: 47.8 metres
- Beam: 12.8 metres
- Height: 5.9 metres
- Sail plan: Full-rigged ship
- Armament: 50 guns: Gun deck: 24 × 24-pounder guns; Upper gun deck: 26 × 12-pounder guns; 56 guns: Gun deck: 24 × 18-pounder guns; Upper gun deck: 26 × 12-pounder guns; Castles: 6 × 6-pounder guns

Sagittaire was a 50-gun ship of the line of the French Navy.

== Career ==
Sagittaire was designed by Coulomb, but as he had to leave for a mission to Malta, Chapelle supervised her launch.

On 13 April 1778, Sagittaire departed Toulon in a squadron under Admiral d'Estaing, along with Languedoc, Tonnant, César, Zélé, Hector, Guerrier, Marseillais, Protecteur, Vaillant, Provence and Fantasque.

She fought at the Battle of St. Lucia on 15 December 1778, where she was tasked to bombard the British battery on the Southern peninsula, along with the 32-gun Chimère.

On 8 July, Sagittaire and Fantasque forced the frigate HMS Mermaid to beach herself at Cape Henhlopen.

On 9 June 1779, Vengeur and Sagittaire, along with the frigates Chimère and Aimable, departed for Martinique under Brach as a distraction to cover Du Rumain's departure, who was sailing for his Capture of Saint Vincent with Lavely, Lys and four transports.

On 14 July, under Albert de Rions, Sagittaire captured the Grenadines, along with Fantasque, under Suffren, and the frigates Lively and Fortunée.

On 15 December 1778, she took part in the Battle of St. Lucia. Two days later, she helped Iphigénie capture HMS Ceres.

On 23 September, Sagittaire captured the 50-gun HMS Experiment, which carried 118,819 piastres. In late 1779, she returned to Toulon, along with Experiment.

Around 1781 she had six 6-pounder guns added on quarterdeck and forecastle, while replacing the 24-pounder guns on the lower gun deck with 18-pounders. In March 1781, Sagittaire departed France, under Montluc de la Bourdonnaye, along with Experiment, under Médine, to join the French squadron off Rhode Island. In April 1782, De Grasse sent them to escort a convoy and put them out of danger from Hood's squadron.

== Fate ==
Sagittaire was loaned to the Compagnie de Chine to be used as a merchantman in 1783, until 1785. In 1788, she was hulked in Lorient, and in 1790 she was sold for use as a merchantman.
