= Louis de Raimondis =

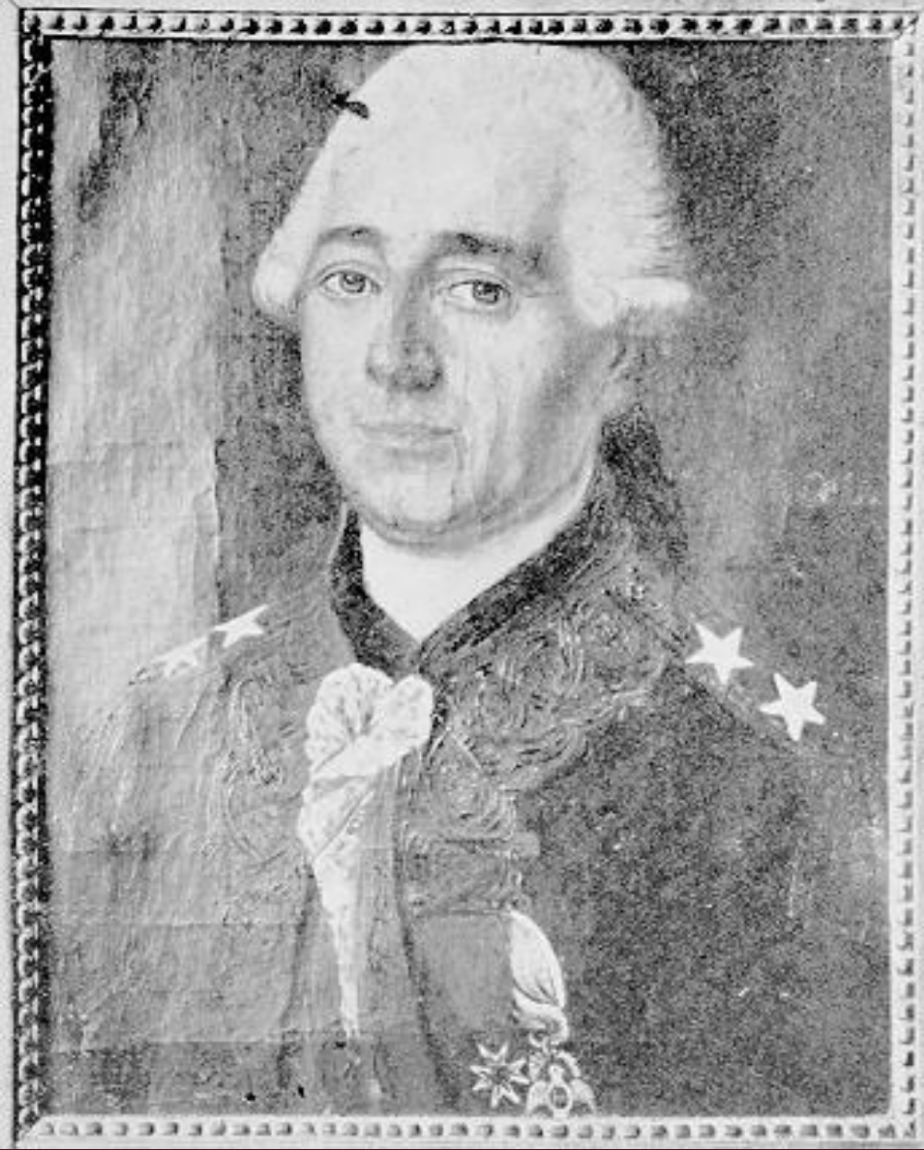
- Born: 1723 Draguignan
- Died: 1 February 1788 (aged 64–65) Lorgues
- Branch: French Navy
- Rank: Chef d'escadre

Louis de Raimondis (Note: Or "Joseph-Louis"; also incorrectly named "Jean-Louis". Also written "Raymondis".) (Draguignan, 1723 — Lorgues, 1 February 1788) was a French Navy officer. He served in the War of American Independence, and became a member of the Society of the Cincinnati.

== Biography ==
Raimondis was born to a family from Provence with a strong naval tradition, and a long involvement in the administrative affairs of the Kingdom. Members of the family had held positions of Seneschal or of Lieutenant principal and Lieutenant général in the administration, and had been supporters of the Crown during the Fronde. One of his ancestors had served as major general of the Navy and had been killed at the Battle of La Hougue.

Raimondis joined the Navy as a Garde-Marine in 1745. He was promoted to Lieutenant in 1757. He served on Modeste in the squadron under La Clue, under Dulac de Montvert.

In 1769, he captained the xebec Singe off Porto-Vecchio. In 1770, he took part in the French conquest of Corsica as an officer on the 64-gun Provence.

Raimondis was promoted to Captain in 1772. From 1773 to 1776, he served on Zélé, and in 1775 he was captain of the 24-gun frigate Gracieuse. From 1778, he commanded the 74-gun César as flag captain to Chef d'escadre Broves in the fleet under Vice admiral d'Estaing.

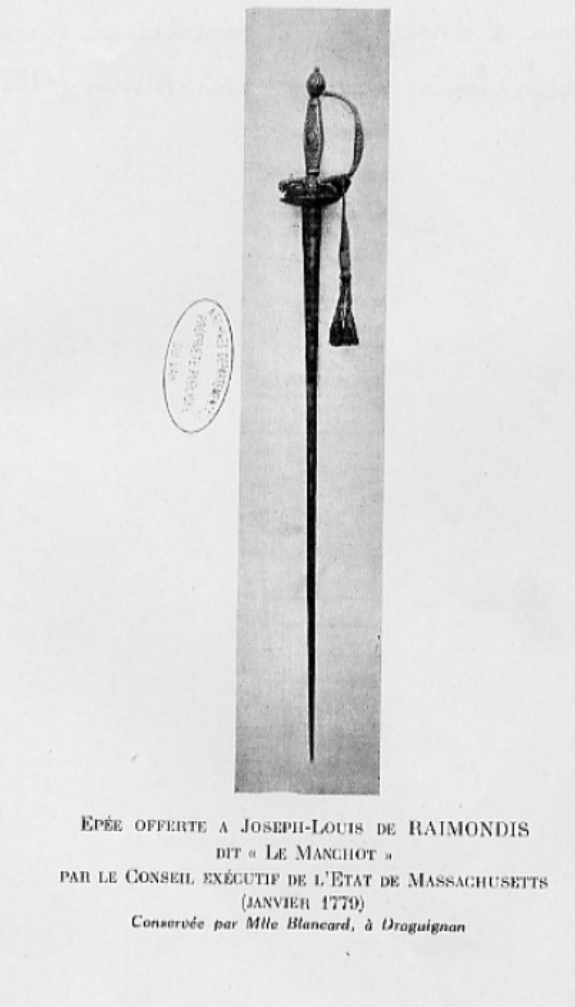
Sword of Honour given by the Executive Council of the State of Massachusetts.

On 16 August 1778, César captured HMS Iris near Rhodes Island. During the battle, a cannonball ripped off Raimondis' right arm. First officer Moriès de Castellet took over command of César. Raimondis was disembarked at Boston on 27 October due to his wounds. In recognition of his service, he was awarded two pensions and the Order of Saint Louis. He also received a sword of honour from the Americans.

In 1782, Raimondis was promoted to Brigadier. He rose to Chef d'escadre in 1784.

== Sources and references ==
Notes

Bibliography

- Bourrilly, Victor-Louis (1937). "Périodiques français méridionaux". Annales du Midi. 49 (196): 432-436.
- Contenson, Ludovic (1934). La Société des Cincinnati de France et la guerre d'Amérique (1778-1783). Paris: éditions Auguste Picard. OCLC 7842336.
- Lacour-Gayet, Georges (1905). La marine militaire de la France sous le règne de Louis XVI. Paris: Honoré Champion. OCLC 763372623.
- Piétri, Valérie (2005). "« Une charge très honorable » : service du roi et reconnaissance sociale en Provence orientale aux XVIIe et XVIIIe siècles". Annales du Midi (in French). 117 (250): 163–185. doi:10.3406/anami.2005.7088. ISSN 0003-4398. OCLC 99466097. 5787390995.
- Troude, Onésime-Joachim (1867). Batailles navales de la France (in French). Vol. 2. Challamel ainé. OCLC 836362484.
