= Pierre de Moriès-Castellet =

- Born: 3 August 1719; Moriez, France
- Died: 25 November 1794 (aged 75); Pisa
- Relatives: Jean-Baptiste de Moriès de Castellet; Jean-Baptiste de Glandevès du Castellet
- Military career
- Branch: French Navy
- Rank: Chef d'escadre
- Conflicts: Battle of Rhode Island; Battle of Grenada; Siege of Savannah

Pierre de Cheylan de Moriès du Castellet (Moriez, 3 August 1719 — Pisa, 25 November 1794) was a French Navy officer. He served in the War of American Independence. He was a member of the Society of the Cincinnati.

== Biography ==
Moriès-Castellet was born to the family of Françoise d’Arbaud de Châteauvieux and François de Cheylan du Castelet Moriès, from Fréjus. He was brother to Jean-Baptiste de Moriès de Castellet, and nephew to Jean-Baptiste de Glandevès du Castellet.

Moriès-Castellet joined the Navy as a Garde-Marine on 6 July 1735. He was promoted to Lieutenant on 23 May 1754.

In 1758, he was given command of the 26-gun frigate Oiseau. In September 1759, he captured the British merchantman Prince of Wales, and brought her back to Toulon. In 1760, he transferred to 32-gun Chimère, before returning to Oiseau from 1761 to 1762. He cruised off the coast of Spain and to Malta.

On 15 January 1762, he was promoted to Captain, and he took command of the 50-gun Fier.

On 19 March 1765, he married Cécile de Glandevès. In 1770, he served as flag captain on Provence, in a three-ship squadron under Rafélis de Broves that departed Toulon on 16 May, bound for Tunisia, where it blockaded the harbours of Sousse and Bizerte. Moriès-Castellet took part in the bombardment of the cities in late June.

In 1774, he was given command of the 32-gun Atalante.

He was promoted to Chef d'escadre on 1 June 1778. That same year, he captained the 74-gun Hector in the squadron under Estaing. He took part in the Battle of Rhode Island, in the Battle of Grenada on 6 July 1779, and in the Siege of Savannah.

== Sources and references ==
Notes

Bibliography

- Contenson, Ludovic (1934). La Société des Cincinnati de France et la guerre d'Amérique (1778-1783). Paris: éditions Auguste Picard. OCLC 7842336.
- Lacour-Gayet, Georges (1905). La marine militaire de la France sous le règne de Louis XVI. Paris: Honoré Champion. OCLC 763372623.
- Roche, Jean-Michel (2005). Dictionnaire des bâtiments de la flotte de guerre française de Colbert à nos jours. Vol. 1. Group Retozel-Maury Millau. pp. 372–373. ISBN 978-2-9525917-0-6. OCLC 165892922.
- Troude, Onésime-Joachim (1867). Batailles navales de la France (in French). Vol. 2. Challamel ainé. OCLC 836362484.
