= Jean-Baptiste de Moriès de Castellet =

- Born: Pignans, France
- Died: 1825
- Relatives: Pierre de Moriès-Castellet; Jean-Baptiste de Glandevès du Castellet
- Military career
- Branch: French Navy
- Rank: Chef d'escadre
- Conflicts: War of American Independence

Jean-Baptiste de Moriès de Castellet (Pignans — 1825) was a French Navy officer. He served in the American Revolutionary War. He was a member of the Society of the Cincinnati.

== Biography ==
Moriès de Castellet was born in Pignans. He was brother to Pierre de Moriès-Castellet, who also served in the Navy, and nephew to Jean-Baptiste de Glandevès du Castellet.

Castellet joined the French Navy as a Garde-Marine on 19 April 1748. He was promoted to lieutenant in 1762, and to captain in 1777.

Castellet was first officer on the 74-gun César under Louis de Raimondis, flag captain to Chef d'Escadre Broves. Raimondis had his right arm shot off on 16 August 1778 in battle against HMS Iris, and was evacuated at Boston on 27 October 1778. Castellet took over.

Castellet took part in the Battle of Rhode Island on 29 August 1778, and in the Battle of Grenada on 6 July 1779, where he was wounded. He still took part in the Siege of Savannah. He was promoted to Chef d'escadre in 1786. In 1792, he was captain of the harbour of Toulon. During the French Revolution, Castellet served in Spain. He died in 1825.

== Sources and references ==
=== Bibliography ===
- Contenson, Ludovic (1934). La Société des Cincinnati de France et la guerre d'Amérique (1778-1783). Paris: éditions Auguste Picard. OCLC 7842336.
- Gélis, Matthieu (2010). "Joseph de Boulainvilliers, premier général des chouans du Morbihan" (PDF). Mémoires de la société d'histoire et d'archéologie de Bretagne (LXXXVIII). Rennes: Société d'histoire et d'archéologie de Bretagne: 153–170. OCLC 869411366. Archived from the original (PDF) on 18 July 2020.
- Lacour-Gayet, Georges (1905). La marine militaire de la France sous le règne de Louis XVI. Paris: Honoré Champion. OCLC 763372623.
- Troude, Onésime-Joachim (1867). Batailles navales de la France (in French). Vol. 2. Challamel ainé. OCLC 836362484.
