= French ship Actionnaire =

French ship of the line

History

France
- Name: Actionnaire
- Builder: Lorient
- Laid down: June 1767
- Launched: 22 December 1767
- In service: April 1770
- Captured: 21 April 1782

General characteristics
- Class & type: Indien class ship of the line
- Displacement: 2250 tonneaux
- Tons burthen: 1300 port tonneaux
- Length: 50.5 metres
- Beam: 13.2 metres
- Draught: 6.7 metres
- Propulsion: Sails
- Sail plan: Full-rigged ship

Actionnaire was a 64-gun ship of the line of the French Navy. Originally built for the French Indies Company, she was purchased by the Navy and saw service during the War of American Independence.

== Career ==
Actionnaire was built for the French Indies Company at Lorient, and entered service for her first commercial journey in 1767. She did a commercial journey to Puducherry, departing Lorient on 12 March 1768 and returning on 30 October 1769.

After the collapse of the Company, the French Navy purchased in April 1770. She did another commercial journey in 1771, and was later recommissioned as a 68-gun ship of the line.

In 1778, Actionnaire was part of the squadron under Orvilliers, being the lead ship in the Third Division of the White Squadron (centre). Her commanding officer was Captain Proisy.

From 1779, she was under Captain Gilart de Larchantel. In 1780, she was part of Guichen's squadron, and she took part in the Battle of Martinique on 17 April 1780, as well as in the actions of 15 May and 19 May 1780.

Larchantel died at Saint-Domingue on 21 January 1781. On 17 July 1781, command of Actionnaire was given to Marigny.

On 20 April 1782, Actionnaire was armed en flûte, under Captain François Julien de Quérangal, and was part of a convoy commanded by Soulanges, with his flag on the 74-gun Protecteur, along with the ship Pégase and the frigates Indiscrète and Andromaque. A 12-ship and 4-frigate British squadron intercepted, and in the subsequent Third Battle of Ushant, HMS Foudroyant and HMS Queen captured Pégase and four transports. Actionnaire retreated, but the 80-gun Foudroyant gave chase and caught up with her in the evening. Actionnaire fired a token broadside and struck her colours.
