= Louisbourg Expedition =

Louisbourg Expedition may refer to:

- Duc d'Anville Expedition or Louisbourg Expedition (1746), a French attempt to capture Louisbourg during the War of the Austrian Succession
- Louisbourg Expedition (1757), a British attempt to capture Louisbourg during the Seven Years' War

== See also ==
- Siege of Louisbourg (disambiguation)
