= François de Glandevès du Castellet =

François de Glandevès du Castellet (22 February 1696 - 31 March 1774) was a French aristocrat and naval officer. He was known as the 'knight de Glandevès' then the 'bailiff de Glandevès' to distinguish him from his elder brother Pierre-André, the 'Commander de Glandevès', also a naval officer. He joined the navy as a young man and reached the rank of chef d'escadre des armées navales in 1767.

== Family ==
He was born into the old and powerful Glandevès family of provençal nobility. It was also linked to other influential families in the region such as the Forbins, the Sabrans, the Villeneuves, the Brunys and the Fabry-Fabrègues. His father was Jean de Glandevès, lord of Le Castellet and Entrevaux, was elected first consul of Aix, and became procureur for the Pays d’Aix in 1701. His mother was Marie de Flotte d’Agoult de Saint Auban (1658-6 July 1724), who had married Jean on 5 October 1686.

He was third child and third son, with his siblings being:

- Honoré de Glandevès, Lord of Castellet (1688–1776); on 20 January 1724 in Marseille married Marie Hiéronyme de Bruny (born 1709)
- Pierre-André de Glandevès du Castellet (1689–1764)
- Anne Marguerite de Glandevès (†1768); on 27 September 1713 at Draguignan married Joseph Barthélémy de Rafélis, lord of Broves (1686–1758) (Note: He was father of Jean Joseph de Rafélis de Broves (1715-1782), a naval lieutenant general)

== Naval career ==
He was received into the Order of St John of Jerusalem as a minor in 1712 but never travelled to Malta or took his final vows as a brother-knight of the Order. In 1713 he joined the French Navy and the following year, aged 18, joined the galley corps as part of a 'garde de l'étendard' (or 'garde du pavillon') company. He fought in several campaigns with it and, after rising through all its ranks, left that corps in 1749 when it was dissolved.

He moved to the ships-of-line corps at the rank of capitaine de vaisseau in 1749. He was made chief of staff in Marseille but had to wait until 1767 to be made chef d'escadre des armées navales, probably delayed or penalised for his previous career in the galley corps. He died at Marseille whilst still in command of the naval forces there.

== Bibliography (in French) ==
- La Chenaye-Aubert, François-Alexandre de (1774). Dictionnaire de la noblesse, contenant les généalogies, l'histoire & la chronologie des familles nobles de la France, l'explication de leurs armes, & l'état des grandes terres du royaume (in French). Paris: Chez la veuve Duchesne. p. 248.
- Michel Vergé-Franceschi, Les officiers du Grand Corps à Toulon au 18th century, (Origines, conditions, services), Nice, 1973
- Vergé-Franceschi, Michel (1990). Les officiers généraux de la marine royale (1715-1774): Le littoral, l'intérieur (in French). Paris: Librairie de l'Inde. ISBN 2-905455-04-7.

== External links (in French) ==
- Family tree on geneanet.org
- Michel Vergé-Franceschi, Detailed biography of La Clue-Sabran
