= French frigate Oiseau (1757) =

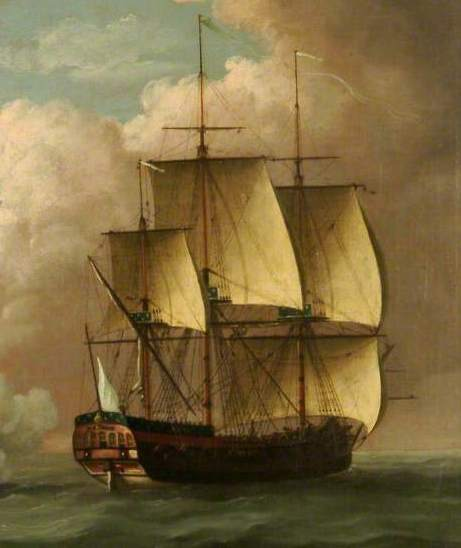
- L'Oiseau in 1762

History

France
- Name: Oiseau
- Namesake: bird
- Ordered: 3 March 1754
- Builder: Toulon
- Laid down: June 1754
- Launched: 25 April 1757
- In service: July 1757
- Fate: Captured on 23 October 1762.

General characteristics
- Class & type: Minerve-class frigate
- Displacement: 900 tonneaux
- Tons burthen: 500 port tonneaux
- Length: 39 m (127 ft 11 in)
- Beam: 10.3 m (33 ft 10 in)
- Draught: 5.0 m (16 ft 5 in)
- Propulsion: Sail
- Armament: 26 guns
- Armour: Timber

Oiseau was a 26-gun frigate of the French Navy.

== Career ==
In 1758, Oiseau made a journey from Toulon to Cartagena, and back, under Sagui Des Tourès. Later that year, Lieutenant Moriès-Castellet took command of Oiseau. In September 1759, she captured the British merchantman Prince of Wales, and brought her back to Toulon. In 1760, Moriès-Castellet transferred to Chimère, but he returned as captain of Oiseau from 1761 to 1762.

From 25 November 1761 to 11 April 1762, she cruised the Eastern Mediterranean under Lieutenant Barras de Saint-Laurent.

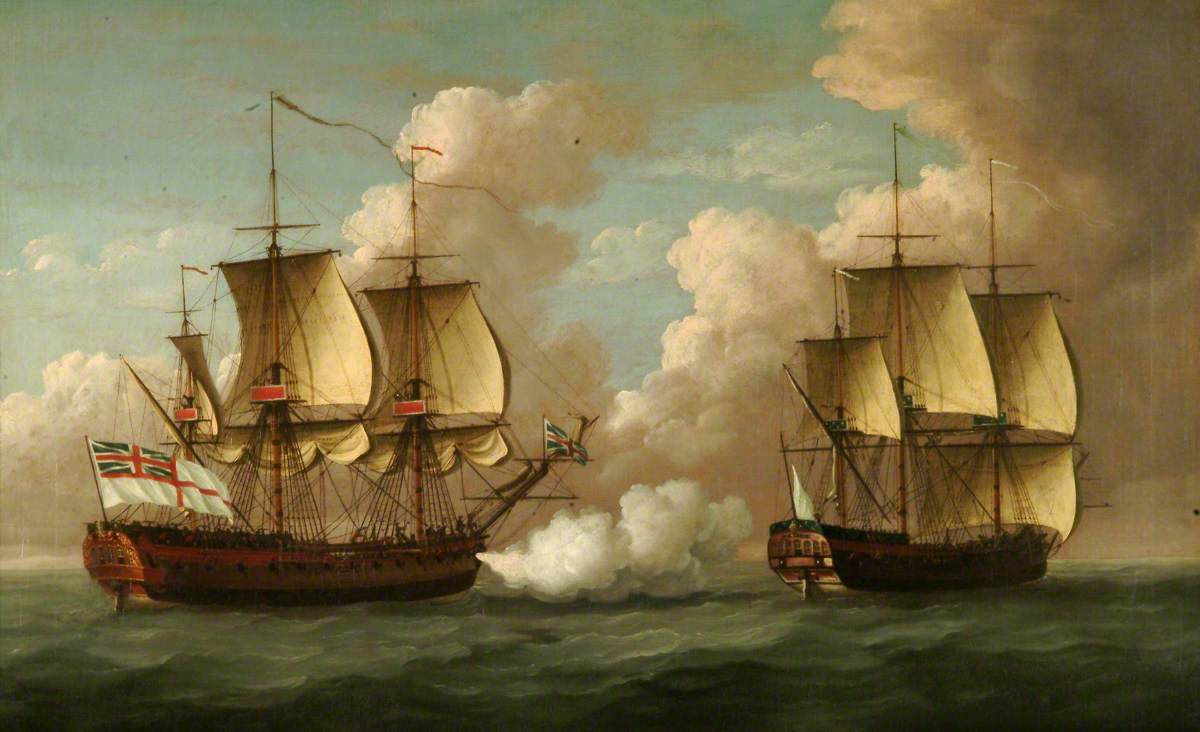
HMS Brune captures Oiseau in 1762

In 1762, she was part of the squadron under Bompard. On 23 October, she was captured by HMS Brune. Her captain, Raymond de Modène, had an arm shot off.

== Sources and references ==
=== Bibliography ===
- Roche, Jean-Michel (2005). Dictionnaire des bâtiments de la flotte de guerre française de Colbert à nos jours. Vol. 1. Group Retozel-Maury Millau. ISBN 978-2-9525917-0-6. OCLC 165892922.
- Rouxel, Jean-Christophe. "Pierre CHEYLAN de MORIES du CASTELET". Parcours de vie dans la Royale.
