= French frigate Chimère =

History

France
- Name: Chimère
- Ordered: 18 October 1756
- Builder: Toulon
- Laid down: January 1757
- Launched: 6 February 1758
- Fate: Sold 1783

General characteristics
- Type: frigate
- Displacement: 1200 tonneaux
- Tons burthen: 610 port tonneaux
- Length: 44.2 metres
- Beam: 11.6 metres
- Depth of hold: 4.7 metres
- Propulsion: Sails
- Armament: 26 × 12-pounder long guns

Chimère was a 32-gun frigate of the French Navy. She notably took part in the War of American Independence.

== Career ==
Chimère was ordered as a privateer by the Chamber of commerce of Marseille on 18 October 1756. On 10 October 1757, the French Navy purchased her, while still under construction.

She first served in the Mediterranean under Faucher. In 1758, she returned Turkish prisoners to Constantinople. She was next under L'Isle Taulanne, and Tressemanes.

On 13 April 1778, Chimère departed Toulon, under Saint-Césaire, as part of a squadron under Admiral d'Estaing Sagittaire, along with Languedoc, Tonnant, César, Zélé, Hector, Guerrier, Marseillais, Protecteur, Vaillant, Provence and Fantasque.

She fought at the Battle of St. Lucia on 15 December 1778, where she was tasked to bombard the British battery on the Southern peninsula, along with the 50-gun Sagittaire.

On 9 June 1779, Vengeur and Sagittaire, along with the frigates Chimère and Aimable, departed for Martinique under Brach as a distraction to cover Du Rumain's departure, who was sailing for his Capture of Saint Vincent with Lavely, Lys and four transports.

On 8 July 1778, she was at Sandy Hook, and was sent to Philadelphia to ferry Ambassador Rayneval.

She then took part in the Siege of Savannah, under Trolong du Rumain.

== Fate ==
From 1780, Chimère was loaned to be used as a merchantman. In August 1783, she was sold.
