= Siege of Louisbourg =

Siege of Louisbourg may refer to:

- Siege of Louisbourg (1745), the capture of the settlement by British forces during the War of the Austrian Succession
- Siege of Louisbourg (1758), the capture of the settlement by British forces during the Seven Years' War, after which it was permanently ceded to the British

== See also ==
- Louisbourg Expedition
  - Louisbourg Expedition (1757), a cancelled British plan to capture Louisbourg during the Seven Years' War
  - Duc d'Anville Expedition (1746), a failed French attempt to capture Louisbourg
