= Battle of Cartagena (1758) =

1758 naval battle of the Seven Years' War

Coordinates: 37.6000°N 0.9833°W

- Part of the Seven Years' War
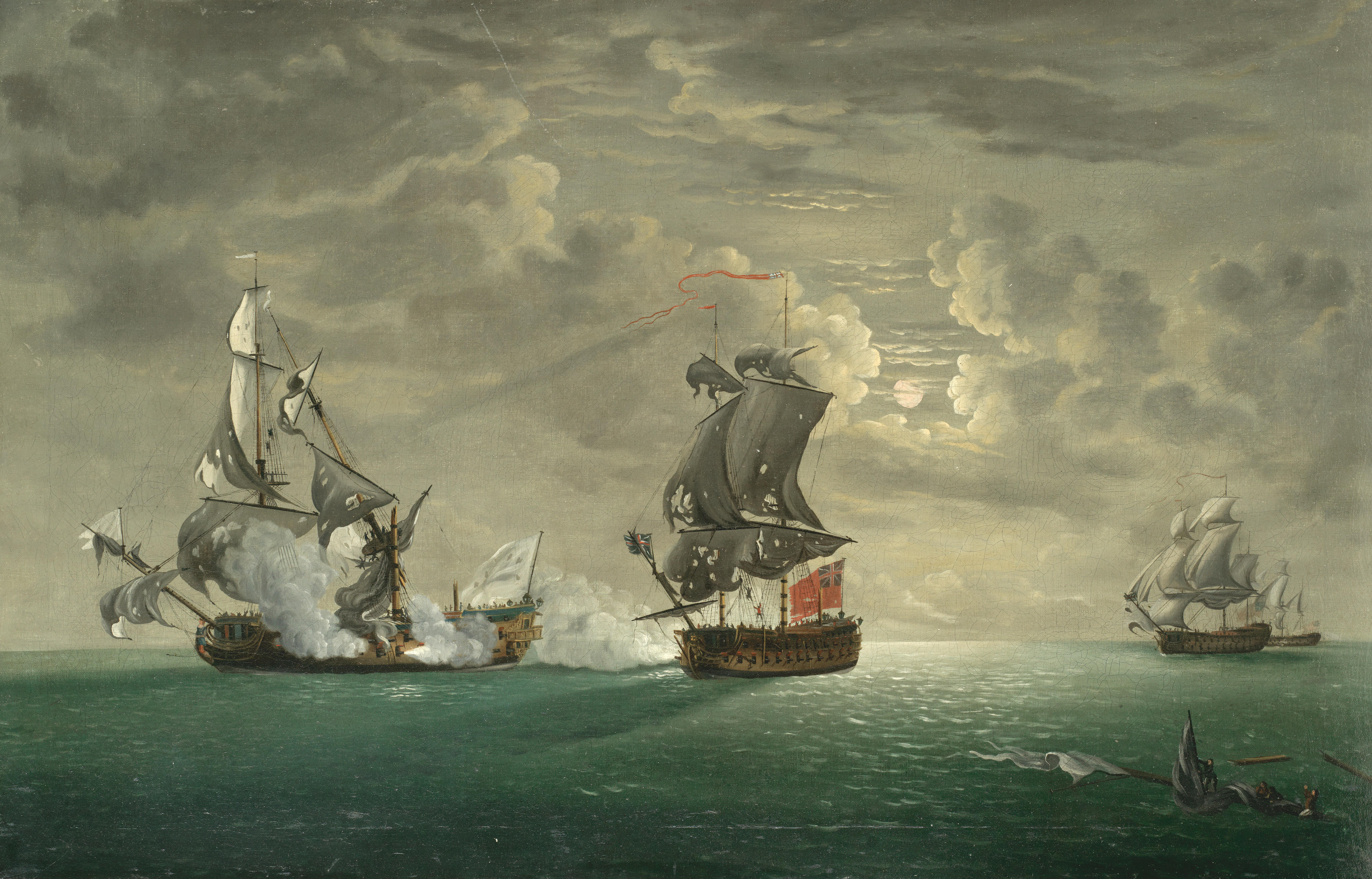
- Painting of the battle by Francis Swaine
Date	28 February 1758
Location	Off Cartagena, Mediterranean Sea
Result	British victory

Belligerents
Great Britain	France

Commanders and leaders
Henry Osborn	Michel de Menneville (surrendered)

Strength
4 ships of the line	3 ships of the line

Casualties and losses
Unknown	Unknown killed, wounded or captured 2 ships of the line captured

The Battle of Cartagena took place on 28 February 1758 off the Spanish port of Cartagena during the Seven Years' War. A British fleet under Henry Osborn, which had blockaded a French fleet in Cartagena, attacked and defeated a French squadron under Michel-Ange Duquesne de Menneville coming to their assistance. The interception of de Menneville's squadron ensured that only limited assistance would come to the French fortress of Louisbourg in North America, which was under a British siege and fell later that year.

== Background ==
In 1756 a French expedition sailed out of Toulon and captured Minorca. After this French ships withdrew to Toulon and did not attempt to depart for the next eighteen months. Operating from their base at Gibraltar British ships mounted an effective blockade at the mouth of the Mediterranean.

In 1757 a British attempt to capture Louisbourg in North America had been frustrated by a build-up of French ships in the surrounding area. The French hoped to adopt a similar strategy for 1758, and decided to send the Brest fleet to boost their forces around Louisbourg. In November 1757 a French force of fifteen ships under Admiral La Clue sailed from Toulon, but following a storm on 30 November they were forced to take shelter in the port of Cartagena, in neutral Spain. They remained there as the British under Henry Osborn moved to bottle up the French in port. Osborn had orders to prevent the French from escaping from the Mediterranean. He received word that a French reinforcement of three ships-of-the-line had set sail from Toulon under Michel-Ange Duquesne de Menneville, intending to combine with La Clue. Two other ships, after failing to capture a British convoy, had also managed to slip into Cartagena to reinforce La Clue.

== Battle ==
Osborn was cruising off Cartagena when he sighted Duquesne's ships approaching. Spotting the larger British force, Duquesne ordered his ships to scatter. With the bulk of his force, Osborn made sure that La Clue was still trapped in Cartagena so he could not come out to help Duquesne. He detached ships to pursue the retreating French.

The Orphee was caught and overpowered by three British ships while the Oriflamme was deliberately run aground to save it from capture. The third ship Foudroyant, Duquesne's flagship, tried to outrun the danger but was pursued by HMS Monmouth. After a chase that lasted into the night, Monmouth caught up with the French ship and began to engage it. Monmouth's captain, Arthur Gardiner, was killed in the fighting. Ultimately Foudroyant surrendered and Duquesne was taken as a prisoner, ending the battle.

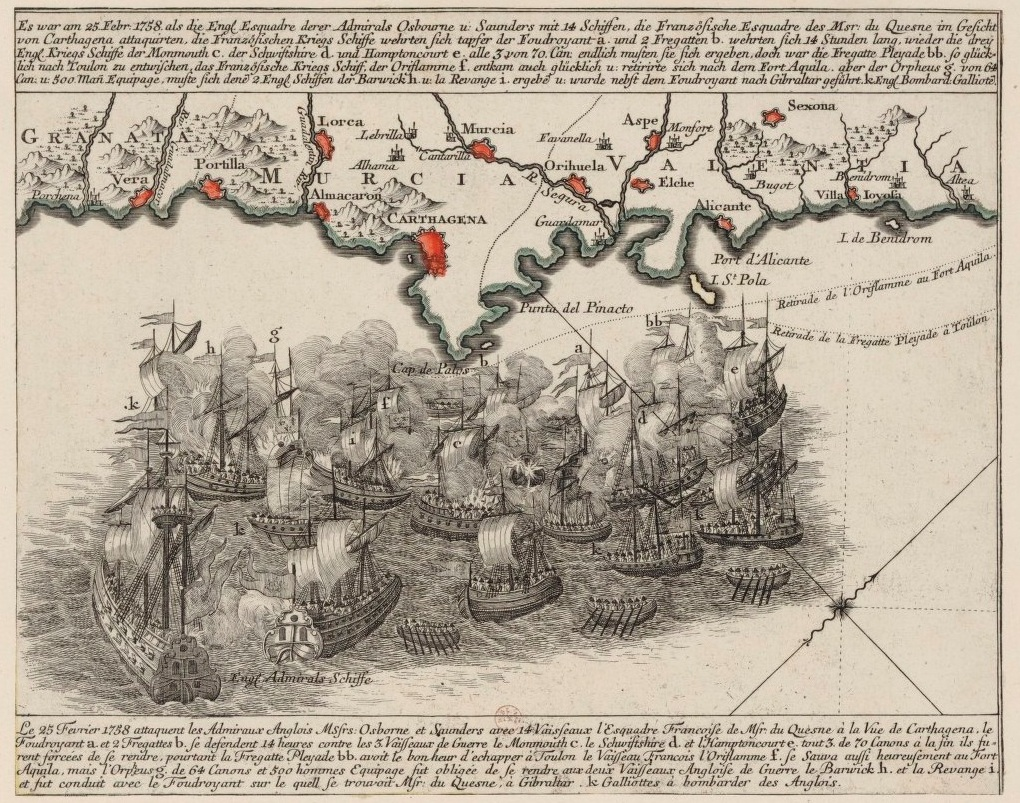
Map of the battle with a list and key to the ships involved

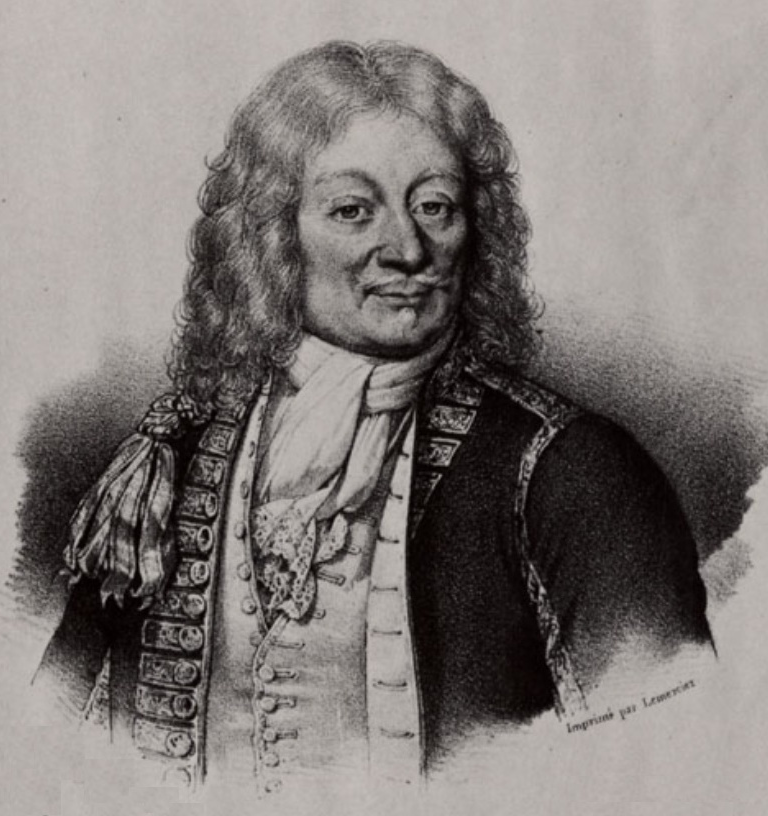
French commander Duquesne. His flagship was captured during the fighting and he was taken prisoner

== Aftermath ==
By July Osborn decided it was too late in the year for the French to sail to North America, and he withdrew from around Cartagena to allow his ships to re-supply. Also coming to the conclusion that there was nothing he could do to assist Louisbourg, which fell on 26 July, La Clue and his ships sailed back to Toulon rather than attempt to force their passage through the Straits of Gibraltar.

The battle went a long way to restoring the reputation of the Royal Navy which had been badly tarnished in the wake of the Fall of Minorca in 1756, which ultimately resulted in the execution of Admiral John Byng for "failing to do his utmost" to save Minorca. This was particularly the case as Arthur Gardiner had Byng's flagship at the Battle of Minorca and his death while fighting served to remove the allegation of cowardice against him.

The campaign offered an example of the "tight blockade" tactics that the British would use even more vigorously the following year, made possible by an innovation in naval warfare because of developments in supplying ships at sea.

== Bibliography ==
- Corbett, Julian Stafford. England in the Seven Years' War: A study in Combined Operations. Volume I. London, 1907.
- Dull, Jonathan R. The French Navy and the Seven Years' War. University of Nebraska, 2005.
- Johnston, Andrew. Endgame 1758: The promise, the glory and the Louisbourg's last decade. University of Nebraska, 2007.
- Middleton, Richard. The Bells of Victory: The Pitt-Newcastle Ministry and the Conduct of the Seven Years' War, 1757-1762. Cambridge University Press, 1985.
- Rodger N.A.M. Command of the Ocean: A Naval History of Britain, 1649-1815. Penguin Books, 2006.
