= Joseph de Bauffremont =

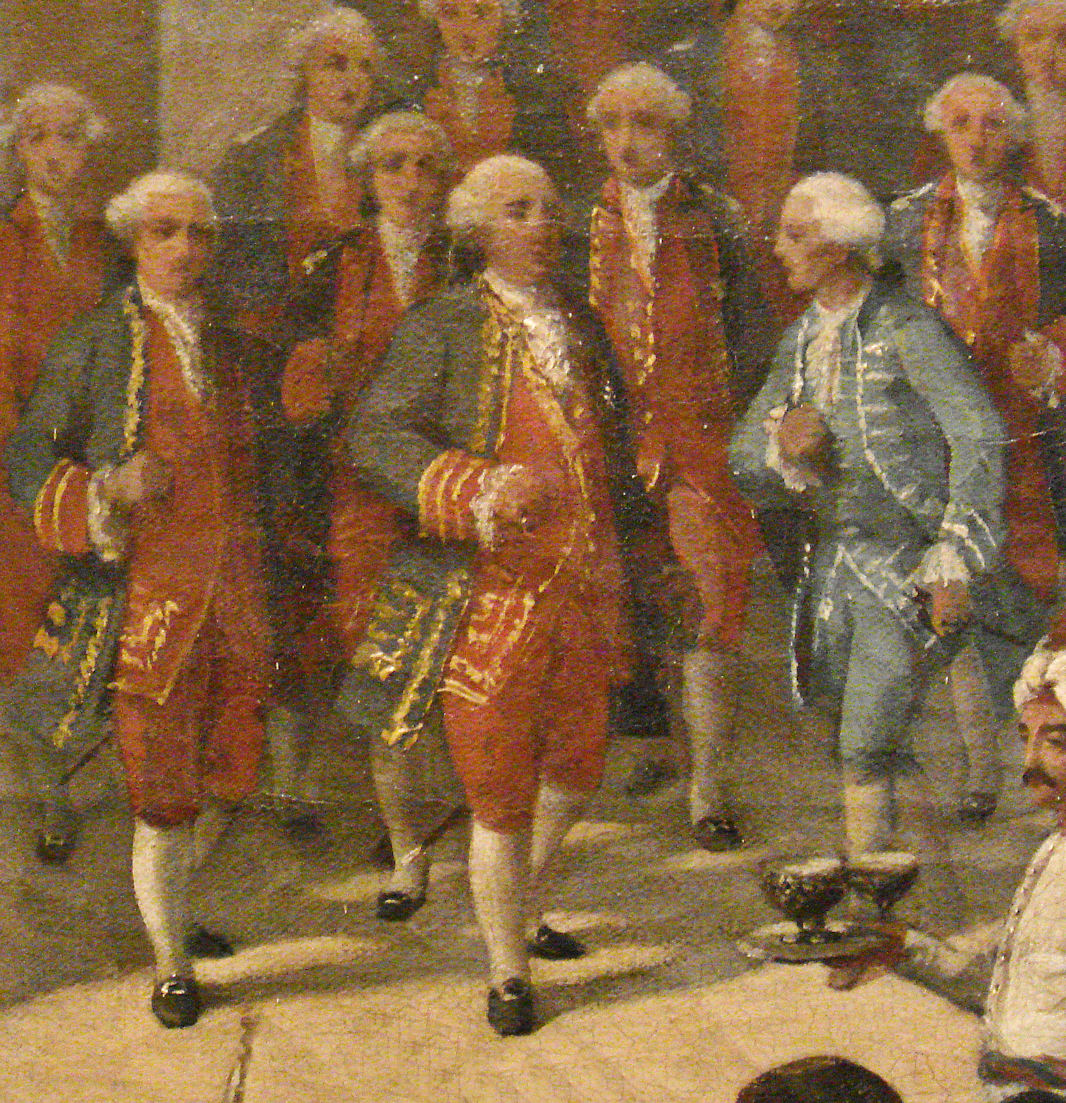
Joseph de Bauffremont (center) with Captain Rafélis de Broves to his right, being welcome into Smyrna by the French Consul, 28 September 1766 detail.

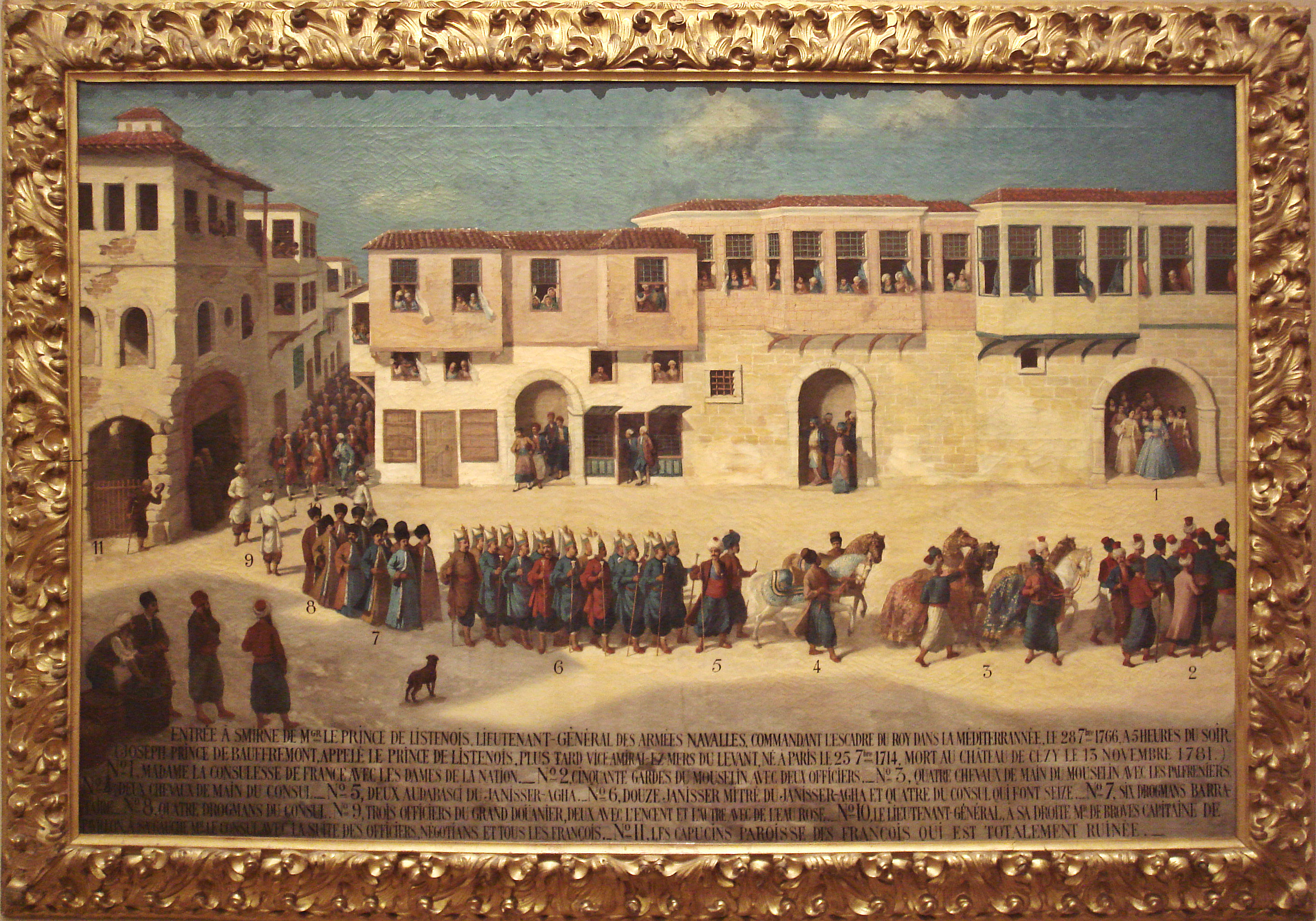
Entry of Joseph de Bauffremont into Smyrna, 28 September 1766.

Joseph de Bauffremont, Prince of Listenois (1714–1781), was a member of the Bauffremont family, and a French Navy officer under Louis XIV. He was a commander in the Seven Years' War. On 16 March 1757 his squadron captured the 50-gun HMS Greenwich, commanded by Captain Robert Roddam, off Saint-Domingue.

That same year, Joseph de Bauffremont brought to Louisbourg five ships-of-the-line and a frigate from Saint Domingue, permitting a strong French naval deployment that repulsed the attempts of Lord Loudon in the Louisbourg Expedition (1757). The British would succeed however the following year in the Siege of Louisbourg (1758).

In 1766, as Lieutenant General of the Navy, was put in charge of a naval division tasked with protecting trade in the Levant. His flagship was the Protecteur. His entry into Smyrne on 28 September 1766 was depicted in an anonymous painting, now visible in the Musée de la Marine.

== See also ==
- Franco-Ottoman alliance
