= French xebec Singe (1762) =

Xebec of the French Navy launched in 1762

Singe
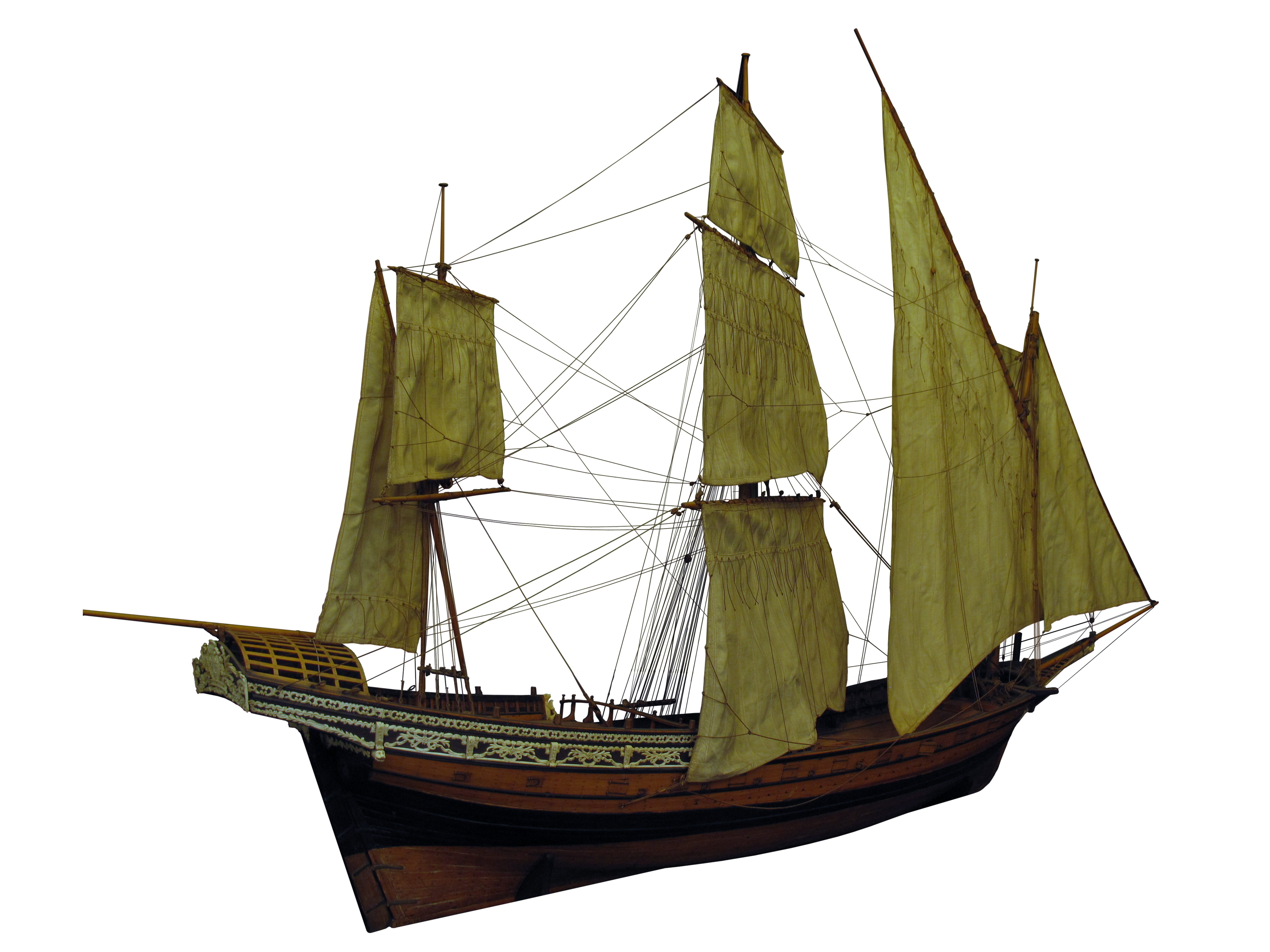
- Model "13 MG 14" on display at the Musée national de la Marine

History

France
- Name: Singe
- Namesake: monkey
- Ordered: 9 December 1761
- Builder: Toulon Dockyard
- Laid down: March 1762
- Launched: 3 July 1762
- In service: 27 July 1762
- Out of service: 1779
- Fate: Sold 1780

General characteristics
- Class & type: Renard-class xebec
- Tons burthen: 200 tonnes
- Length: 37.4 metres
- Beam: 9.1 metres
- Depth of hold: 3.5 metres
- Armament: 20 guns

Singe was a Renard-class xebec of the French Navy, launched in 1762. She served in the Mediterranean against the Barbary pirates, and is notable for a number of important officers who served aboard, notably Flotte, Raimondis and Suffren.

== Career ==
In 1763, Singe patrolled the Mediterranean with her sister-ship Caméléon and the frigate Pléïade, to ward off the Salé Rovers. On 15 July 1763, Singe mistakenly engaged a galiot from Algiers, which she mistook for a Salé rover. Pléïade intervened fired two broadsides into the galiot, which sank with all hands before the error was realised. This triggered a diplomatic incident and Captain Fabry had to negotiate a resolution to the crisis.

In 1763, Singe was under Suffren, part of a squadron under Duchaffault. She took part in the Larache expedition in June 1765.

In 1769, Singe off Porto-Vecchio under Raimondis.

== Fate ==
Singe was sold in Toulon in 1780.

== Legacy ==
A 1/28.8 scale model of Singe is on display at the Musée national de la Marine in Paris.
