= Pierre-André de Glandevès du Castellet =

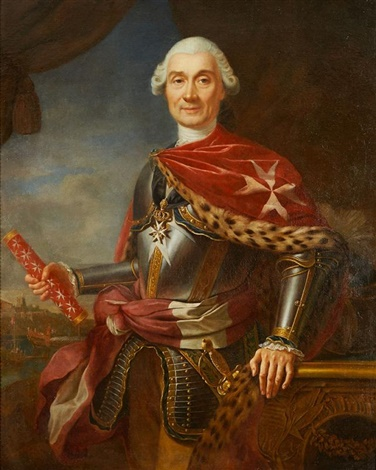
Portrait by an unknown artist, previously thought to show du Castellet but now known to show Giovanni Battista Tommasi, Grand Admiral of the Order of St John and last Grand Master of Malta from 1803 to 1805. (Note: The error crept in from mistaking Tommasi's coat of arms (barry of gules and or) for du Castellet's (barry of or and gules).)

Pierre-André de Glandevès du Castellet (14 September 1689 – 26 December 1764) was French naval commander and aristocrat known as the 'Commander de Glandevès'. He retired from the navy in 1764 as a lieutenant general ad honores.

== Family ==
He was born at the château de Castellet-Saint-Cassien into the old and powerful Glandevès family of provençal nobility. It was also linked to other influential families in the region such as the Forbins, the Sabrans, the Villeneuves, the Brunys and the Fabry-Fabrègues. His father was Jean de Glandevès, lord of Le Castellet and Entrevaux, was elected first consul of Aix, and became procureur for the Pays d’Aix in 1701. His mother was Marie de Flotte d’Agoult de Saint Auban (1658-6 July 1724), who had married Jean on 5 October 1686.

He was second child and second son, with his siblings being:

- Honoré de Glandevès, Lord of Castellet (1688–1776); on 20 January 1724 in Marseille married Marie Hiéronyme de Bruny (born 1709)
- François de Glandevès du Castellet (1696–1774), known as the 'bailiff of Castellet' to distinguish him from his brother; presented to the Order of St John of Jerusalem in 1712, became head of a naval squadron in 1767
- Anne Marguerite de Glandevès (†1768); on 27 September 1713 at Draguignan married Joseph Barthélémy de Rafélis, lord of Broves (1686–1758) (Note: He was father of Jean Joseph de Rafélis de Broves (1715-1782), another naval lieutenant general)

== Naval career ==
Like many younger sons from noble families, he was presented to the Order of St John of Jerusalem, in his case at the Grand Priory of Saint-Gilles in 1701, 1702 or 1703. Even so, he also joined a company of marines at Toulon in 1702, rising to enseigne de vaisseau in 1712 and lieutenant des gardes du Pavillon in 1729.

Early in the War of the Austrian Succession he was given a brevet promotion to capitaine de vaisseau (1741). He already had forty years' naval service behind him and had not risen through the ranks quickly despite support from his family connections. He was promoted to naval chef d'escadre in 1752, then commander of naval forces at Toulon in 1754 and again in 1757–1758.

At the end of spring 1756, in the first months of the Seven Years' War, Louis XV ordered Louis-François-Armand de Vignerot du Plessis to capture Minorca, then under British control. Count La Galissonière was given command of twelve ships of the line and five frigates to transport French troops there. He met a British force under John Byng on 20 May and defeated it, with Glandevès commanding the vanguard aboard the 74-gun Redoutable and fighting in the battle off Port-Mahon. He wrote a report of the battle. ·

He resigned his command of Toulon in 1758 and the naval minister Monsieur de Massiac wrote to him that 11 August stating "His Majesty has instructed me to convey to you his complete satisfaction with the zeal with which you have fulfilled the position entrusted to you". La Clue-Sabran took over the role, but only lasted fifteen months before Glandevès took it on again until his retirement in 1764. He also died in the town.

== Sources and bibliography (in French) ==
- Édouard Baratier, Georges Duby and Ernest Hildesheimer (ed.s), Atlas historique. Provence, Comtat Venaissin, principauté d’Orange, comté de Nice, principauté de Monaco, Paris, Librairie Armand Colin, 1969
- de La Chenaye-Aubert, François-Alexandre (1774). Dictionnaire de la noblesse, contenant les généalogies, l'histoire & la chronologie des familles nobles de la France, l'explication de leurs armes, & l'état des grandes terres du royaume (in French). Paris: Chez la veuve Duchesne. p. 248.
- Mollat du Jourdin, Michel (1991). Marins et océans. Vol. 2. Commission française d'histoire maritime, Economica. p. 155, note 49. ISBN 2-7178-2127-9.
- Vergé-Franceschi, Michel (1973). Les officiers du Grand Corps à Toulon au 18th century, (Origines, conditions, services) (in French). Nice.
- Vergé-Franceschi, Michel (1985). Le Lieutenant général des Armées Navales : Jean-François Bertet de La Clue-Sabran (1696-1764) (PDF) (in French). p. 7 et 21.
- Vergé-Franceschi, Michel (2002). Dictionnaire d'Histoire maritime. Bouquins (in French). éditions Robert Laffont.
- Taillemite, Étienne (2002). Dictionnaire des marins français (in French). Paris: éditions Tallandier. ISBN 2-84734-008-4.

== External links (in French) ==
- Pierre-André de Glandevès on Geneanet
- d'Agay, Frédéric. "Un épisode naval de la guerre de Sept Ans" (in French). Institut de stratégie comparée.
