= Jean-Baptiste de Glandevès du Castellet =

French Navy officer of the War of American Independence

- Born: 7 November 1728; Castellet-Saint-Cassien, France
- Died: 1803 (aged 74–75)
- Relatives: Pierre-André de Glandevès du Castellet; Pierre de Moriès-Castellet
- Military career
- Branch: French Navy
- Rank: Contre-amiral
- Conflicts: Battle of Cape Sicié; Seven Years' War; Battle of Minorca; Battle of Lagos; War of American Independence; Battle of Martinique; Battle of the Chesapeake; Battle of the Saintes

Jean-Baptiste de Glandevès du Castellet (Note: Also written "Glandevez".) (Castellet-Saint-Cassien, 7 November 1728 — 1803) was a French Navy officer. He served in the War of American Independence.

== Biography ==
Glandevès was born to the family of Marie Hiéronyme de Bruny and of Charles François de Glandevès du Castellet. He was cousin to Pierre-André de Glandevès du Castellet, and uncle to Pierre de Moriès-Castellet.

Glandevès joined the Navy as a Garde-Marine in July 1741. He served on the 64-gun Solide, on which he took part in the Battle of Cape Sicié on 22 February 1744. In 1746, he was on Trident before transferring to Argonaute and taking part in Duc d'Anville expedition.

He was promoted to Lieutenant in 1756. That year, during the Seven Years' War, he served on the 64-gun Achille, which was part of the squadron under La Galissonière. He took part in the Battle of Minorca on 20 May 1756. He was wounded on the 80-gun Océan at the Battle of Lagos on 18–19 August 1759.

Glandevès was promoted to Captain in 1772. In 1774, he was given command of the frigate Atalante. In 1777, he transferred to the 64-gun Lion, and later he was appointed to the 74-gun Souverain.

On Souverain, Glandevès took part in the Battle of Martinique on 17 April 1780, in the Battle of the Chesapeake on 5 September 1781, and at the Battle of the Saintes on 12 April 1782. In 1782, he was promoted to Brigadier, and to Chef d'escadre in on 20 August 1784.

He was the officer in charge of the Navy at Toulon from 1790 to 1791, and was brutalised by a mob during the revolutionary unrest. In 1792, he was promoted to Contre-amiral.

Glandevès was a Commander in the Order of Saint Louis, and a Knight of the Order of Malta.

== Legacy ==
Ségur mentioned Glandevès in his Mémoires as "An officer respectable because of his age, his skills and bravery. his sophisticated intelligence, his gentle piety, and his calm and kindly character made him like equally from his superiors, his equals and his subordinates." (Note: Officier respectable par son âge, son habileté et sa bravoure. Un esprit orné, une piété douce, un caractère calme et bienveillant le faisaient généralement aimer par ses chefs, ses égaux et par ses inférieurs.)

== Sources and references ==
Notes

Citations

References

- Contenson, Ludovic (1934). La Société des Cincinnati de France et la guerre d'Amérique (1778-1783). Paris: éditions Auguste Picard. OCLC 7842336.
- Havard, Oscar (1911). Histoire de la Révolution dans les ports de guerre (in French). Firmin Didot.
- Lacour-Gayet, Georges (1905). La marine militaire de la France sous le règne de Louis XVI. Paris: Honoré Champion. OCLC 763372623.
- Ségur, Louis Philippe (1859). Mémoires, souvenirs et anecdotes par M. le Comte de Ségur (in French). Firmin Didot.
- Taillemite, Étienne (1982). Dictionnaire des Marins français. Paris: Éditions maritimes et d'Outre-Mer. ISBN 9782707000316.
- Troude, Onésime-Joachim (1867). Batailles navales de la France (in French). Vol. 2. Challamel ainé.
