= César-class ship of the line =

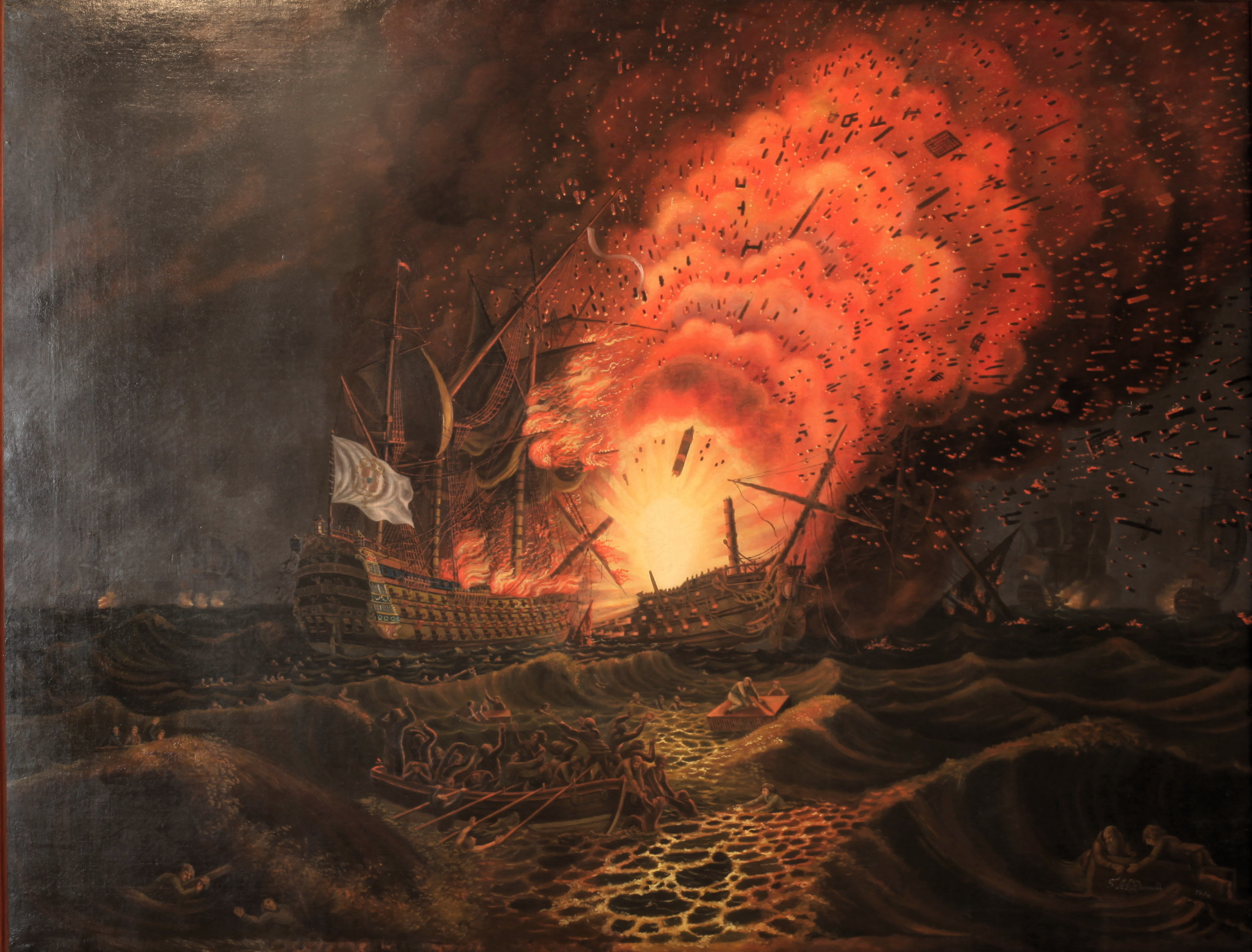
- César (right) blowing up at the Battle of the Saintes

Class overview
- Name: César
- Builders: Toulon Dockyard
- Operators: French Navy
- Completed: 2

General characteristics
- Type: Ship of the line
- Displacement: 2900 tonneaux
- Tons burthen: 1550 port tonneaux
- Length: 157½ French feet (Note: The French (pre-metric) foot was 6.575% longer than the equivalent French foot.)
- Beam: 43½ French feet
- Draught: 20 French feet 8 inches
- Depth of hold: 29¾ French feet
- Complement: 715 (later 734), + 6/12 officers
- Armament: 74 guns: Lower gundeck: 28 × 36-pounder long guns; Upper gundeck: 30 × 24-pounder long guns; Forecastle and quarterdeck: 6 × 8-pounder long guns

The César class or Zélé class included two 74-gun ships of the line designed by Joseph Coulomb. They were a development of his earlier 74-gun ship, Zélé of 1763.

- César

Builder: Toulon
Ordered: 10 March 1767
Launched: 3 August 1768
Fate: Captured and burnt by the British at the Battle of the Saintes, 12 April 1782

- Destin

Builder: Toulon
Ordered: 7 February 1770
Launched: 21 October 1777
Fate: Captured by the British at Toulon in August 1793, and burnt by them there in December 1793

== Sources and references ==
- Roche, Jean-Michel (2005). Dictionnaire des bâtiments de la flotte de guerre française de Colbert à nos jours 1 1671–1870. p. 223. ISBN 978-2-9525917-0-6. OCLC 165892922.
- Nomenclature des navires français de 1715 á 1774. Alain Demerliac (Editions Omega, Nice – 1995). ISBN 2-906381-19-5.
- Winfield, Rif and Roberts, Stephen (2017) French Warships in the Age of Sail 1626-1786: Design, Construction, Careers and Fates. Seaforth Publishing. ISBN 978-1-4738-9351-1.
