= Charles Louis de Bernard de Marigny =

French Navy officer of the War of American Independence

- Died: 12 April 1782; Caribbean Sea
- Relatives: Charles de Bernard de Marigny (brother)
- Military career
- Allegiance: France
- Branch: Navy
- Service years: 1756-1782
- Rank: Captain
- Commands: Fortunée; Vaillant; Réfléchi; Actionnaire; César
- Conflicts: War of American Independence

Charles Louis de Bernard de Marigny (Note: Also designated "the elder" ("aîné") or "Vicomte", as opposed to his brother Charles de Bernard de Marigny, who was Chevalier until his death.) (died 12 April 1782 on the César during the Battle of the Saintes) was a French Navy officer. He served in the War of American Independence.

== Biography ==
Bernard de Marigny joined the Navy as a Garde-Marine on 22 June 1756. His younger brother, Charles de Bernard de Marigny, also served in the Navy and rose to vice admiral.

He was promoted to Lieutenant on 27 November 1765, and to Lieutenant-colonel in 1777. In 1778, he was in command of the 32-gun frigate Fortunée. He rose to Captain on 13 March 1779.

After Fortunée was captured, Marigny was given command of the 64-gun Vaillant, which he captained at the Battle of Fort Royal on 29 April 1781, and later of Réfléchi.

On 17 July 1781, he took command of the 64-gun Actionnaire.

He captained the 74-gun César during the Battle of the Saintes, on 12 April 1782. He was wounded during the battle, and died when César exploded in the night following the battle.

== Sources and references ==
Notes

Citations

References

- Contenson, Ludovic (1934). La Société des Cincinnati de France et la guerre d'Amérique (1778-1783). Paris: éditions Auguste Picard. OCLC 7842336.
- Kérallain, R. (1928). "Bougainville à l'armée du Cte de Grasse". Journal de la société des américanistes (20).
- Kerguelen, Yves-Joseph (1796). Relation des combats et des évènements de la guerre maritime de 1778 entre la France et l'Angleterre (in French). Imprimerie de Patris.
- Lacour-Gayet, Georges (1910). La marine militaire de la France sous le règne de Louis XVI. Paris: Honoré Champion. pp. 431–434.
- Troude, Onésime-Joachim (1867). Batailles navales de la France (in French). Vol. 2. Challamel ainé. OCLC 836362484.

External links

- Archives nationales (2011). "Fonds Marine, sous-série B/4: Campagnes, 1571-1785" (PDF).
