= Battle of Ushant (1782) =

1782 battle of the American Revolutionary War

- Part of the American Revolutionary War
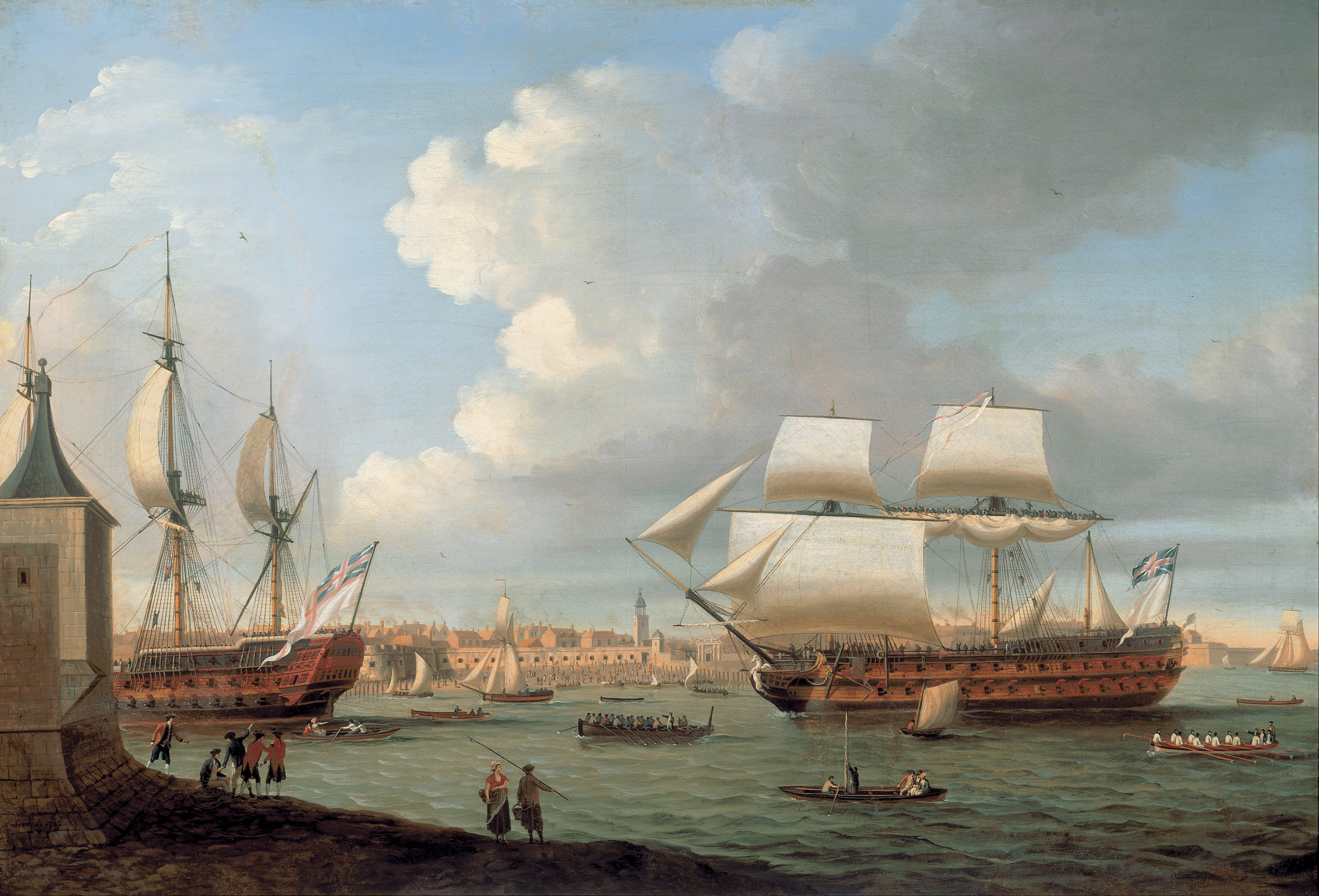
- HMS Foudroyant and Pégase entering Portsmouth Harbour nine days after the battle
Date	20–21 April 1782
Location	Off Ushant, Bay of Biscay, Atlantic Ocean
Result	British victory

Belligerents
Great Britain	France

Commanders and leaders
Samuel Barrington; John Jervis (WIA); Frederick Maitland	Chevalier de Sillans (surrendered); François Julien de Quérangal (surrendered)

Strength
12 ships of the line 3 frigates	3 ships of the line 2 frigates 19 transport ships

Casualties and losses
5 wounded	80 killed 40 wounded 2,100 captured 2 ships of the line captured 12 transport ships captured

The Battle of Ushant (also known as the action of 20–21 April 1782 or the Third Battle of Ushant) was fought on 20–21 April 1782 during the American Revolutionary War between a French Navy squadron of three ships of the line protecting a convoy of 12 transport ships and a Royal Navy fleet off Ushant, a French island at the mouth of the English Channel off the northwesternmost point of France. It was the third battle that occurred in this region during the war, and resulted in a clear British victory.

== Background ==
Despite the American Revolutionary War breaking out in North America, the fighting soon spilled over into Europe and the East Indies between the British and the French. The British had received intelligence that the French were dispatching a small fleet from Brest, which was destined for the Indian subcontinent to supply Pierre André de Suffren's fleet in his campaign to recapture French possessions previously captured by the British in the Seven Years' War and secure naval supremacy in the region against a British fleet under the command of Edward Hughes. Vice-Admiral Samuel Barrington set out to sea with a fleet consisting of twelve ships of the line along with three frigates in hopes of capturing the convoy before it could leave European waters, setting sail on 5 April 1782 from Portsmouth harbour.

On 20 April the fleet was northeast of Ushant when the frigate HMS Artois under the command of Captain John Macbride informed the rest of the fleet after sighting the French convoy. Barrington then made the signal for the 84-gun ship of the line HMS Foudroyant in the lead under Captain John Jervis to give chase to the French fleet. The French convoy consisted of 19 transport ships and the 64-gun Actionnaire armed en flûte and bound from Brest to Isle de France. They were escorted by the 74-gun Protecteur and Pégase, and the frigates Indiscrète and Andromaque. At sunset Foudroyant managed to sail far ahead from her fellow warships, and near enough to the French fleet to identify them as a convoy. The squadron soon afterwards separated, and the largest ship, the 1,778-ton Pégase, which Foudroyant was pursuing, also bore up.

== Battle ==
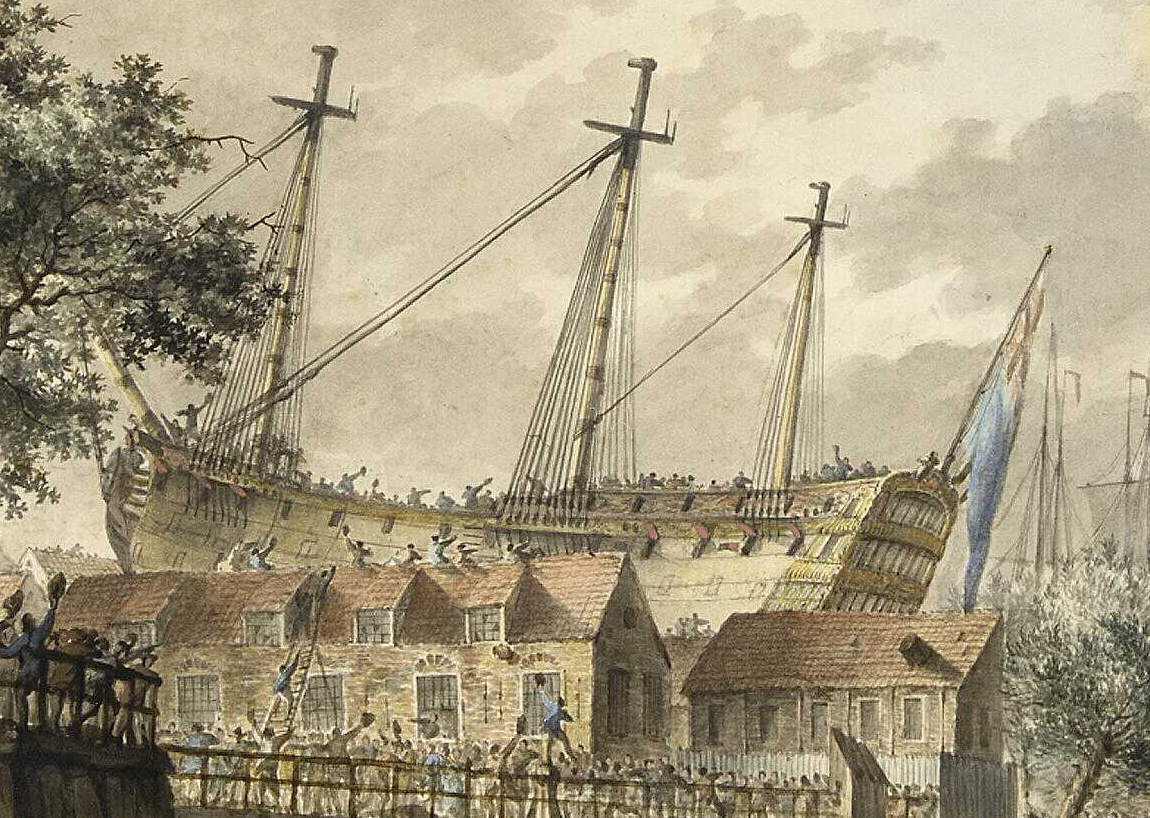
HMS Queen, which fought at the battle

A hard squall with hazy weather, coming on about the same time Foudroyant lost sight of the fleet, and about half an hour after midnight, brought the chase to close action. Broadsides from Foudroyant caused significant damage to Pégase, and after engaging her for roughly forty-five minutes, Foudroyant managed to board the Pégase, and compelled her commander, the Chevalier de Sillans, to surrender. Out of a crew of seven hundred men, she had upwards of one hundred killed and wounded while the rest of the crew was captured. Only two or three men were wounded in Foudroyant including Jervis himself.

With other British ships catching up to scatter the French convoy, Pégase was taken possession of. On board the British sailors found a great deal of carnage and the ship had suffered severe damage to her rigging and masts. Her mizzen mast and foretop mast collapsed and fell overboard soon after the action. In the morning of 21 April, some of the squadron again rejoined Foudroyant, and with the disabled state of Pégase and the continuation of a strong gale with heavy seas, Jervis made the decision to signal for immediate assistance. The 90-gun HMS Queen, captained by Frederick Maitland, signaled that she would assist the Foudroyant with keeping the stricken Pégase afloat.

As soon as the weather permitted, Jervis moved the French prisoners-of-war on board his ship; Maitland took a hundred prisoners on board Queen and put a prize crew onto Pégase in addition to those formerly sent by Jervis. Maitland ordered Pégase and a cutter that was in company to sail back home to England. He then immediately made sail towards the rest of the convoy, which he sighted after a fourteen-hour chase. Queen engaged the lone ship of the line protecting the convoy, engaging her with a broadside which was returned with only a single cannon shot, after which the French man-o'-war struck her colours.

Maitland immediately took possession of the warship and found her to be Actionnaire, a 64-gun French ship armed en flûte and commanded by Captain François Julien de Quérangal. She had on board 260 seamen and 550 soldiers, of whom nine were killed and twenty wounded. At this time there were over 1,100 French prisoners on board Queen and Maitland initially attempted to chase the French ship of the line Protecteur, but quickly changed his mind and decided to assist in the capture of the remainder of the helpless convoy. Twelve transport ships were captured, four of them by the frigate HMS Prudente commanded by Charles FitzGerald. Jervis, in the meanwhile, also captured four transport ships: Fidelité (178 troops and stores), Belonne (147 troops and stores), Lionne (180 troops and stores), and Duc de Chartres (stores and arms). (Note: Fidelité, of 4,790 tons and twelve guns, had been chartered a year earlier. Belonne had only been chartered the month before.)

== Aftermath ==
Almost two-thirds of the French convoy had been captured, inflicting severe financial damage on the French treasury. Eleven chests of Dutch silver were found on board Actionnaire, alongside a large quantity of naval stores, ordnance, provisions, wine and rum. There were also spare lower masts (enough to equip four ships of the line) alongside spare sails and rigging in addition to her own spares, which were intended for the recently captured British ship HMS Hannibal, which was renamed Petit Annibal. The capture of two-thirds of the convoy was a significant blow to the French forces operating in the Indian Ocean. British casualties were minimal, with only a total of five men wounded and moderate damage to their ships, which was easily repaired. Pégase, though, had been severely damaged, particularly in her rigging and masts, which required extensive repairs when she returned to Portsmouth. She was commissioned into the Royal Navy as the third-rate HMS Pegase. She served as a hulk from 1799 onwards, and was used in this role until 1815 when the vessel was decommissioned and broken following the end of the Napoleonic Wars.

Prudente was sailing back towards Spithead with his prizes when she encountered a cutter off Cape Clear Island. FitzGerald ordered Prudente to give chase, which lasted for 36 hours until Prudente came into firing range with the fleeing French ship, after which the vessel struck her colours and FitzGerald took possession of her. She was the French privateer Marquis de Castries and was pierced for 20 guns but mounted only 18. Barrington ordered his fleet, along with the captured prizes, to return to Spithead on 26 April, with not a single prize foundering during the return trip thanks to the tight attention paid to them by the British. After the British Admiralty heard of this success, Jervis was invested as a Knight of the Bath on 19 May 1782 for his actions during the engagement. Jervis continued his service in the war, serving under Richard Howe at the Battle of Cape Spartel during the relief of the Franco-Spanish investment of Gibraltar. He would go on to achieve his greatest success at the Battle of Cape St. Vincent, seventeen years later.

== Bibliography ==
- Demerliac, Alain (2004). La Marine de Louis XVI: Nomenclature des Navires Français de 1774 à 1792 (in French). Éditions Ancre. ISBN 2-906381-23-3.
- Lavery, Brian The Ship of the Line – Volume 1: The development of the battlefleet 1650–1850. Conway Maritime Press, 1983. ISBN 0-85177-252-8.
- Roche, Jean-Michel (2005). Dictionnaire des bâtiments de la flotte de guerre française de Colbert à nos jours. Vol. 1. Group Retozel-Maury Millau. ISBN 978-2-9525917-0-6. OCLC 165892922.
- Mahan, Alfred Thayer (2010). Sea Power and the American Revolution: 1775-1783. Fireship Press. ISBN 9781935585176.
- Winfield, Rif, British Warships of the Age of Sail 1714–1792: Design, Construction, Careers and Fates, Seaforth, 2007, ISBN 1-86176-295-X
