= Jean-François Gilart de Larchantel =

French Navy officer

- Died: 23 January 1781; Saint-Louis-du-Sud
- Military career
- Allegiance: France
- Branch: Navy
- Rank: Captain
- Commands: Ambition
- Conflicts: War of American Independence

Jean-François Gilart de Larchantel ( — Saint-Louis-du-Sud, 23 January 1781) was a French Navy officer. He notably served during the War of American Independence.

== Biography ==
Larchantel was born to a family from Bretagne. He joined the Navy as a Garde-Marine on 1 April 1748. He was promoted to Lieutenant on 1 January 1761.

In 1772, Larchantel captained the 20-gun corvette Ambition. The year after, he transferred to the fluyt Salomon.

In 1776, Larchantel captained the frigate Indiscrète. He sailed her to Saint-Domingue. On 4 April 1777, Larchantel was promoted to Captain, and he was appointed to the command of the 64-gun Roland, last ship in the second Division of the Blue Squadron (rear) of the fleet under Orvilliers.

From 1779, he captained the 64-gun Actionnaire, from Brest. In 1780, she was part of Guichen's squadron, and she took part in the Battle of Martinique on 17 April 1780, as well as in the actions of 15 May and 19 May 1780.
