= Charles de Bernard de Marigny =

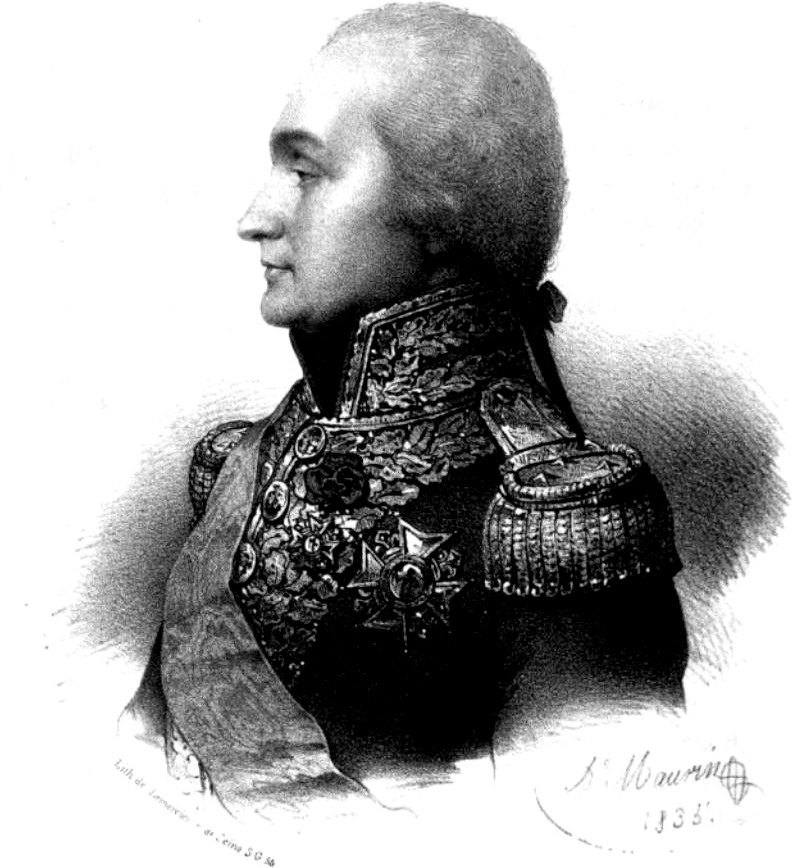
- Born: February 1, 1740; Sées
- Died: July 25, 1816 (aged 76); Brest
- Military career
- Allegiance: Kingdom of France; French First Republic; First French Empire; Kingdom of France
- Branch: Navy
- Service years: 1754-1816
- Rank: Vice admiral

Charles-René-Louis, vicomte de Bernard de Marigny (French pronunciation: [ʃaʁl ʁəne lwi də bɛʁnaʁ də maʁiɲi]; 1 February 1740, in Sées – 25 July 1816, in Brest) was a French vice admiral, grand-cross of the ordre de Saint-Louis and commander of the Brest fleet.

== Biography ==
Born the fourth boy of an eight-child, old-but-poor family from Normandy, Marigny was destined to an ecclesiastic career; he was soon sent to Sées seminary. However, his temperament inclined him more to adventure; and at age 14 he escaped the seminary to find refuge with his older brother, Augustin Etienne Gaspard Bernard de Marigny, who was a Garde-Marine in Rochefort.

Marigny broke relations with his father and studied to enter the gardes de la marine as well. He was admitted in 1754 and was appointed to the frigate Valeur the next year, for a 14-month campaign. He suffered from acute sea sickness, but he eventually managed to overcome this problem.

Promoted to ensign in 1757, Marigny was appointed to the corvette Zéphir, and later to the 74-gun Actif, taking part in a campaign to India.

After 40 months, Marigny returned to France on Zodiaque, and served successively on Glorieux, Minotaure, Union, the frigate Légère and the fluyt Garonne. He cruised off Hispaniola, off Africa, Portugal, and India. In 1767, he was promoted to lieutenant and sent in a survey mission on the coasts of India. After an eight-month journey, he returned to France with a mémoire for the Ministry of the Navy.

In 1770, Marigny was given command of the scow Dorade, ferrying ammunition from Bayonne to Rochefort. After Dorade was decommissioned, Marigny was appointed to the harbor of Brest.

In 1775, Marigny was awarded the Order of Saint Louis and given command of the corvette Serin, and of the station of Windward Islands.

Poisoned by sleeping on his freshly repainted ship, Marigny fell ill for one year and had to resign his command. Once cured, he was given command of the corvette Étourdie, cruising in the English Channel for six months.

In late 1777, Marigny was appointed to the frigate Belle Poule and tasked with escorting Simeon Deane, brother of Silas Deane, back to the United States, who had been sent by Benjamin Franklin with news of the preliminaries and imminent signing of the Franco-American treaties. On 7 January 1778, Belle Poulle was intercepted by HMS Hector and HMS Courageux at 45° 46 N 8° W. The ships maneuvered as to take Belle Poule in a crossfire and demanded that Marigny put a boat to sea, which he refused. A British ship then sent a boat and asked "Who are you, where do you come from, where are you sailing?", to which Marigny replied:

I am the Belle Poule, frigate of the King of France; I come from the sea and I go to the sea; the ships of the King, my master, never submit to inspection.

After some negotiation, the British officer stated that he had confused Belle Poule for a ship of the revolted colonies masquerading as a French ship.

As freemason, Charles de Bernard de Marigny served as "worshipful master" of his lodge, l'Heureuse rencontre, in Brest
