= HMS Foudroyant (1758) =

Ship of the line of the Royal Navy

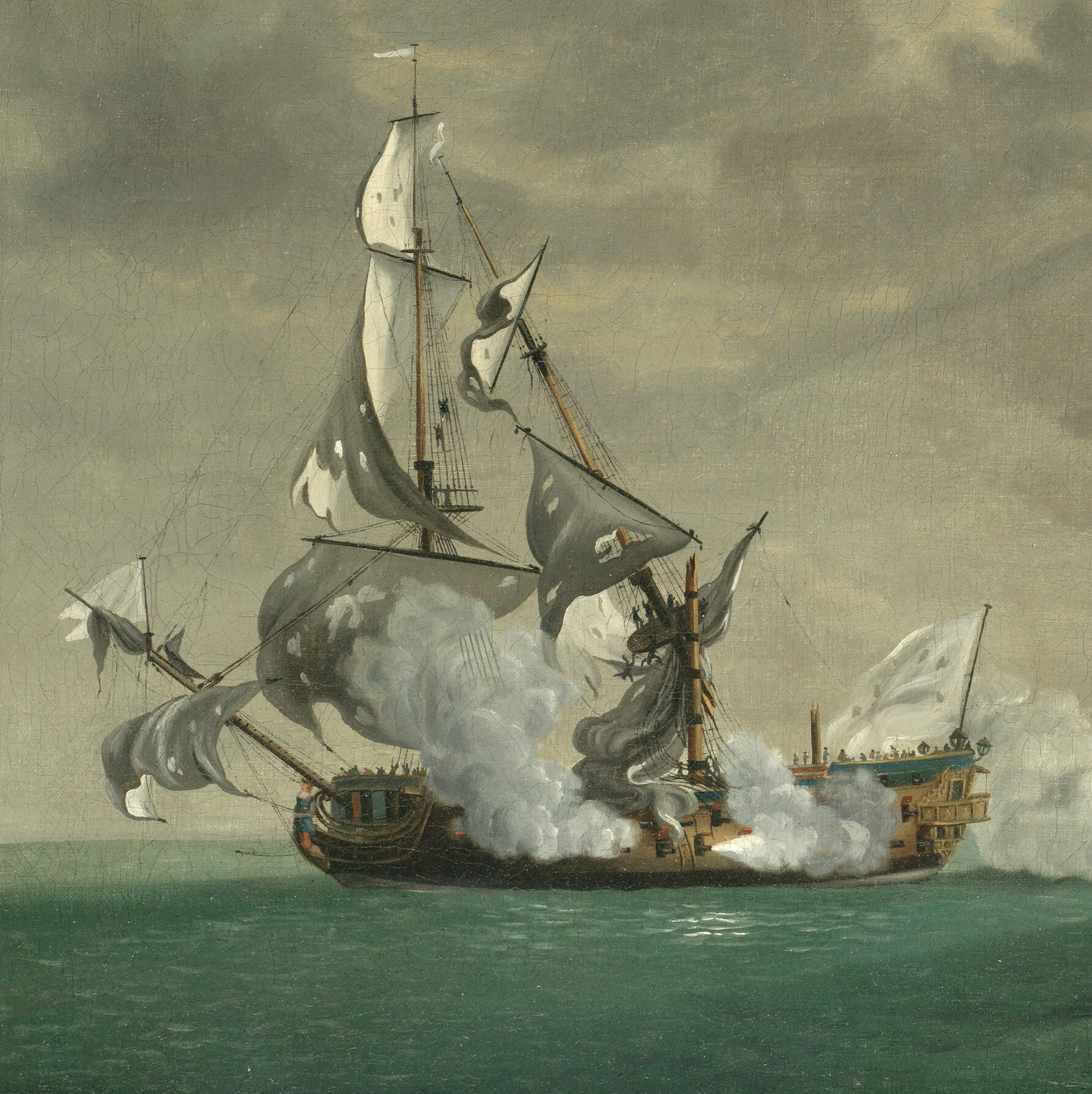
- Foudroyant at the Battle of Cartagena

History

France
- Name: Foudroyant
- Builder: Toulon shipyard
- Laid down: August 1748
- Launched: 18 December 1750
- Commissioned: April 1751
- Captured: 28 February 1758, by the Royal Navy
- Notes: Participated in: Battle of Minorca (1756)

Great Britain
- Name: HMS Foudroyant
- Acquired: Captured on 28 February 1758; Purchased by Admiralty order on 6 December 1758
- Commissioned: June 1759
- Fate: Broken up by 26 September 1787
- Notes: Participated in: Battle of Ushant (1778); Great Siege of Gibraltar

General characteristics
- Class & type: 80-gun Third Rate ship of the line
- Tons burthen: 2061 57/94(bm)
- Length: 180 ft 5 in (54.99 m) (gundeck)
- Beam: 50 ft 3 in (15.32 m)
- Depth of hold: 23 ft (7.0 m)
- Propulsion: Sails
- Sail plan: Full-rigged ship
- Armament: French service: Gundeck: 30 × 36-pounder guns; Upper gundeck: 32 × 18-pounder guns; QD: 18 × 8-pounder guns

Foudroyant was an 80-gun ship of the line of the French Navy. She was captured by a British squadron on 28 February 1758 at the Battle of Cartagena and subsequently commissioned into the Royal Navy as the third-rate HMS Foudroyant.

== French Navy service and capture ==
Foudroyant was built at Toulon to a design by François Coulomb, and was launched on 18 December 1750. She was present at the Battle of Minorca in 1756, where she engaged the British flagship HMS Ramillies. She then formed part of a squadron under Jean-François de La Clue-Sabran, during which time she was captured during the Battle of Cartagena off Cartagena, Spain on 28 February 1758 by Monmouth, Hampton Court and Swiftsure. The Monmouth's Captain Arthur Gardiner was mortally wounded early in the fight, and his two lieutenants, led by Lt Robert Carkett, commanded the Monmouth for most of the battle. The captain of the Foudroyant, the Marquis de Quesne, insisted upon handing his sword to Lt Carkett. 190 were killed on the Foudroyant. It was then towed to Cape de Gata by HMS Swiftsure before being taken to Gibraltar for repair, where it was made sea-worthy again.

== Royal Navy service ==
She was brought into Portsmouth in September 1758 still with the captured French on board. The crew were then imprisoned at Porchester Castle. The Marquis de Quesne and his two senior captains were brought to England independently on HMS Gibraltar and held at Northampton. Junior officers were held at Maidstone. She was surveyed at Portsmouth for £163.10.2d. The Admiralty approved her purchase on 7 November that year, and she was duly bought on 6 December for the sum of £16,759.19.11d. She was officially named Foudroyant and entered onto the navy lists on 13 December 1758. She underwent a refit at Portsmouth between February and August 1759 for the sum of £14,218.9.2d to fit her for navy service.

She was commissioned in June 1759 under the command of Captain Richard Tyrell, serving as the flagship of Vice-Admiral Sir Charles Hardy between June and October 1759. She spent August sailing with Admiral Edward Hawke's fleet. Foudroyant underwent another refit at Portsmouth in the spring of 1760, commissioning later that year under Captain Robert Duff. She sailed to the Leeward Islands in April 1760, but had returned to Britain by Autumn 1761 to undergo another refit. She took part in the operations off Martinique in early 1762, before coming under the command of Captain Molyneaux Shuldham later that year. She served for a short period as the flagship of Admiral George Rodney, before being paid off in 1763. She underwent several surveys, and a large repair between February 1772 and January 1774, after which she was fitted to serve as the Plymouth guardship in April 1775. She recommissioned again in August that year, under the command of Captain John Jervis, and was stationed at Plymouth until early 1777.

In March 1777 she was fitted for service in the English Channel, and spent that summer cruising off the French coast. On 31 July 1777, she engaged the American privateer Fancy, which was driven ashore at Penzance, Cornwall. On 18 June 1778 she engaged and captured the 32-gun Pallas, and was then present with Admiral Augustus Keppel's fleet at the Battle of Ushant on 27 July 1778. Jervis was briefly replaced as captain by Captain Charles Hudson, while the Foudroyant became the flagship of her old commander, now Vice-Admiral Lord Shuldham. Jervis resumed command in 1779, sailing with Hardy's fleet, before being moved to a detached squadron in December 1779. Foudroyant returned to port in early 1780, where she was refitted and had her hull coppered. On the completion of this work by May, she returned to sea, sailing at first with Admiral Francis Geary's fleet, and later with George Darby's. She was then present at the relief of Gibraltar in April 1781, after which she was moved to Robert Digby's squadron. By the summer of 1781 she had returned to sailing with Darby's fleet, and by April 1782 had moved to a squadron under Samuel Barrington.

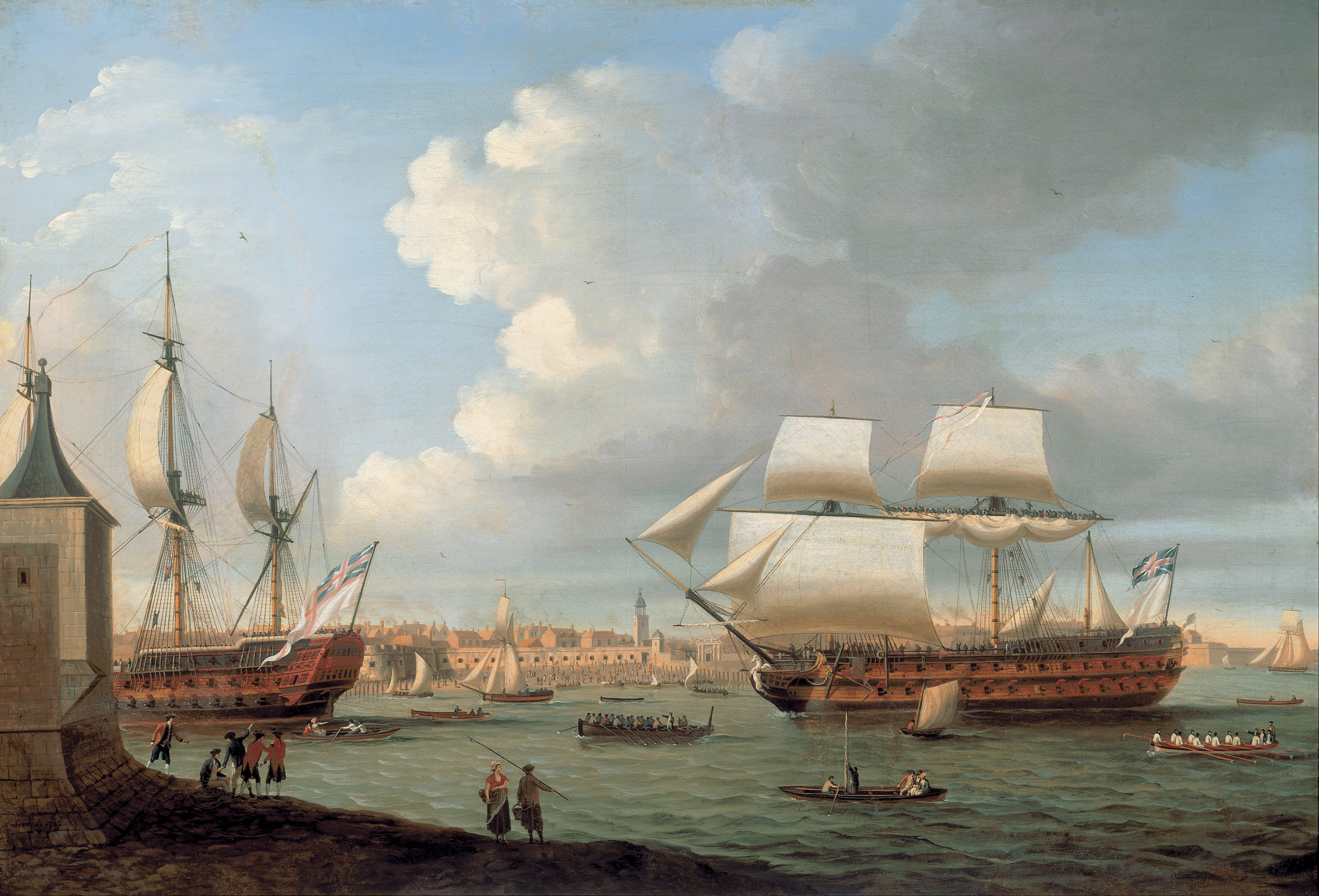
HMS Foudroyant (left) towing Pégase into Portsmouth Harbour on 30 April 1782

She captured the French 74-gun Pégase on 21 April 1782, for which actions Jervis was knighted. In addition to Pégase, Jervis captured four transports: Fidelité (178 troops and stores), Belonne (147 troops and stores), Lionne (180 troops and stores), and Duc de Chartres (stores and arms). (Note: Fidelité, of 4790 tons and 12 guns, had been chartered a year earlier. Belonne had only been chartered the month before.)

She sailed again in July 1782, this time as part of a fleet under Admiral Richard Howe, before spending the autumn cruising in the Western Approaches. She briefly came under the command of Captain William Cornwallis in 1783, but was soon paid off and then fitted for ordinary.

== Fate ==
An Admiralty order of 24 August 1787 provided for Foudroyant to be broken up and she was sold off for £479.3.2d. The breaking up had been completed by 26 September 1787.

== See also ==
- List of ships captured in the 18th century
