= French ship Provence (1763) =

Ship of the line of the French Navy

History

France
- Name: Provence
- Namesake: Estates of Provence
- Builder: Toulon
- Laid down: May 1762
- Launched: 29 April 1763
- In service: June 1763
- Out of service: 1785
- Fate: Broken up 1786
- Notes: Offered by the Estates of Provence

General characteristics
- Displacement: 23,200 tonneaux
- Tons burthen: 1,150 port tonneaux
- Length: 59.7 m (195 ft 10 in)
- Beam: 13.2 m (43 ft 4 in)
- Draught: 6.9 m (22 ft 8 in)
- Propulsion: Sail, full-rigged ship
- Complement: 556 men
- Armament: 64 guns

Provence was a 64-gun ship of the line of the French Navy. She was funded by a don des vaisseaux donation from the Estates of Provence.

== Career ==
Ordered as Union in February 1762, the ship was renamed Provence on 17 March, and begun in May on plans by engineer Gauthier.

After an uneventful career, she was decommissioned in February 1769, but reactivated in April of the next year and commissioned under Captain Moriès-Castellet. She was appointed to a three-ship squadron under Rafélis de Broves and departed Toulon on 16 May, bound for Tunisia, where she blockaded the harbours of Sousse and Bizerte, and took part in the bombardment of the cities in late June.

In 1776, Provence was under Chef d'Escadre Abon and served as flagship of one of the three division in the Escadre d'évolution.

In 1778, she took part in the naval operations in the American Revolutionary War under Captain Desmichel-Champorcin. She took part in the Battle of Grenada, where Desmichel-Champorcin was killed. In December 1779, she had returned to Brest, where she was decommissioned.

On 2 May 1780, she departed Brest with the seven-ship and three-frigate Expédition Particulière under Admiral Ternay, escorting 36 transports carrying troops to support the Continental Army in the War of American Independence. The squadron comprised the 80-gun Duc de Bourgogne, under Ternay d'Arsac (admiral) and Médine (flag captain); the 74-gun Neptune, under Sochet Des Touches, and Conquérant, under La Grandière; and the 64-gun Provence under Lombard, Ardent under Bernard de Marigny, Jason under La Clocheterie and Éveillé under Le Gardeur de Tilly, and the frigates Surveillante under Villeneuve Cillart, Amazone under La Pérouse, and Bellone. Amazone, which constituted the vanguard of the fleet, arrived at Boston on 11 June 1780.

Between 1783 and 1785, she sailed as a merchantman for the Compagnie de Chine, before being struck in Rochefort and broken up in 1786.
