= French ship César (1768) =

Ship of the line of the French Navy

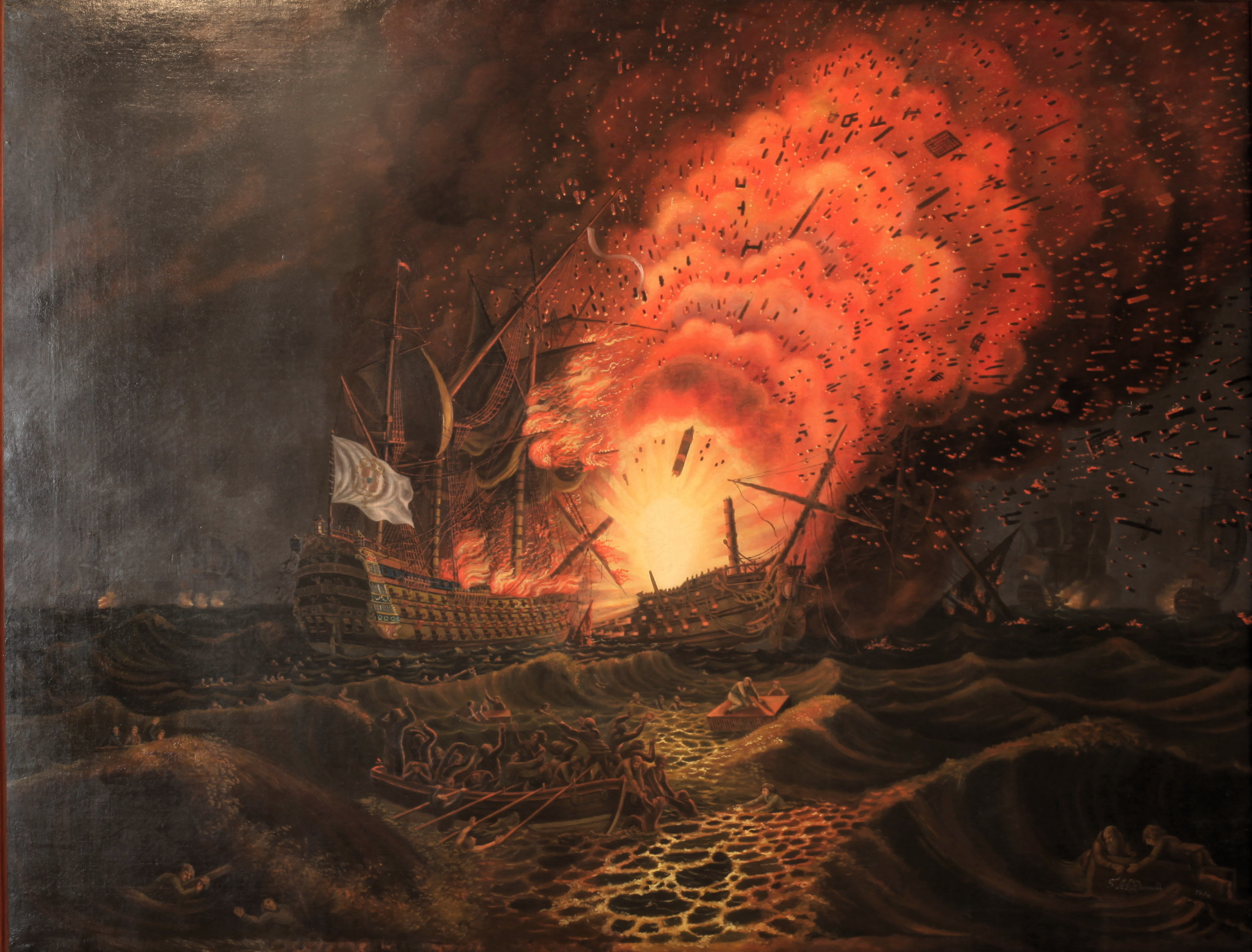
- The end of the César, by François Aimé Louis Dumoulin

History

France
- Name: César
- Namesake: Caesar
- Ordered: 10 March 1767
- Builder: Toulon
- Laid down: August 1767
- Launched: 3 August 1768
- In service: November 1768
- Fate: Blew up on 12 April 1782

General characteristics
- Class & type: César-class ship of the line
- Displacement: 2900 tonneaux
- Tons burthen: 1500 port tonneaux
- Length: 54.6 m (179 ft 2 in)
- Beam: 14.1 m (46 ft 3 in)
- Draught: 6.7 m (22 ft 0 in)
- Sail plan: Full-rigged ship
- Armament: 74 guns: 28 36-pounders; 30 18-pounders; 16 8-pounders; 6 18-pounder howitzers

César (French: [sezaʁ]) was a 74-gun ship of the line of the French Navy. Ordered in early 1767 from the Toulon shipyard, she was launched on 3 August 1768. César saw service in the American Revolutionary War, during which she was destroyed in the Battle of the Saintes.

== Career ==
=== D'Estaing's squadron (1778–1779) ===
At the time of the French entry to the American Revolutionary War, César was under the command of Captain Louis de Raimondis, flag captain to Chef d'Escadre Broves. On 13 April 1778, César sailed from Toulon bound for North America, with the 12 ships of Estaing's fleet. The fleet arrived at the mouth of the Delaware River, north of Baltimore, on 8 July and pursued several enemy ships. On 8 August, the fleet forced the straits at New York and entered the mouth of the Connecticut River, where the British forces were anchored. The British burnt seven of their ships and their stores. On 11 August 1778, César was separated from the squadron by a violent storm at the time when they were about to engage in a battle with the forces of Richard Howe. On 16 August 1778, César battled HMS Iris and then went to shelter at Boston, where she was joined by the other French ships. Captain Raimondis had his right arm shot off in the battle, and was evacuated at Boston on 27 October 1778. First officer Castellet took over.

In December 1778, after d'Estaing's squadron had transferred to the West Indies, César took part in the Battle of St. Lucia. On 6 July 1779 César was part of the rear squadron in the hard-fought Battle of Grenada against the forces of John Byron. After d'Estaing's failure to support the Siege of Savannah in October 1779, César returned to France with the other ships that had arrived off North America in 1778 in order to be refitted and to recruit new crew.

=== De Grasse's fleet (1781–1782) ===
In 1781, César left for the West Indies under the command of Charles Régis de Coriolis d'Espinouse in the fleet of the Comte de Grasse. On 28 April she was present at the Battle of Fort Royal, attempting to raise the blockade of Martinique. On 24 May César was part of the squadron which covered the French Invasion of Tobago. On 5 September 1781 César was present at the decisive Battle of the Chesapeake, which completed the encirclement of the British forces at Yorktown.

In 1782, still with De Grasse's fleet, César sailed to the West Indies and in January took part in the Battle of Saint Kitts. César was then at the Battle of the Saintes on 12 April 1782, during which she was totally dismasted and then captured by HMS Centaur.

A prize crew of 58 men and one lieutenant were placed on the ship and the crew were locked below deck. Here around 9 pm they accidentally started a fire whilst breaking into the officers liquor cabinet. The fire spread and at 10.30 pm reached the magazine, causing it to explode. César was destroyed, killing 400 French sailors and 50 British members of the prize crew. To make things worse, during the 90 minutes before the explosion they were jumping in the water, not realising that the ship was surrounded by sharks. The ship's captain, Bernard de Marigny, who was injured and confined to his cabin, was killed in the explosion. César was one of the twenty ships lost by the French Navy during the American Revolutionary War.
