= Michel Vergé-Franceschi =

French naval historian (born 1951)

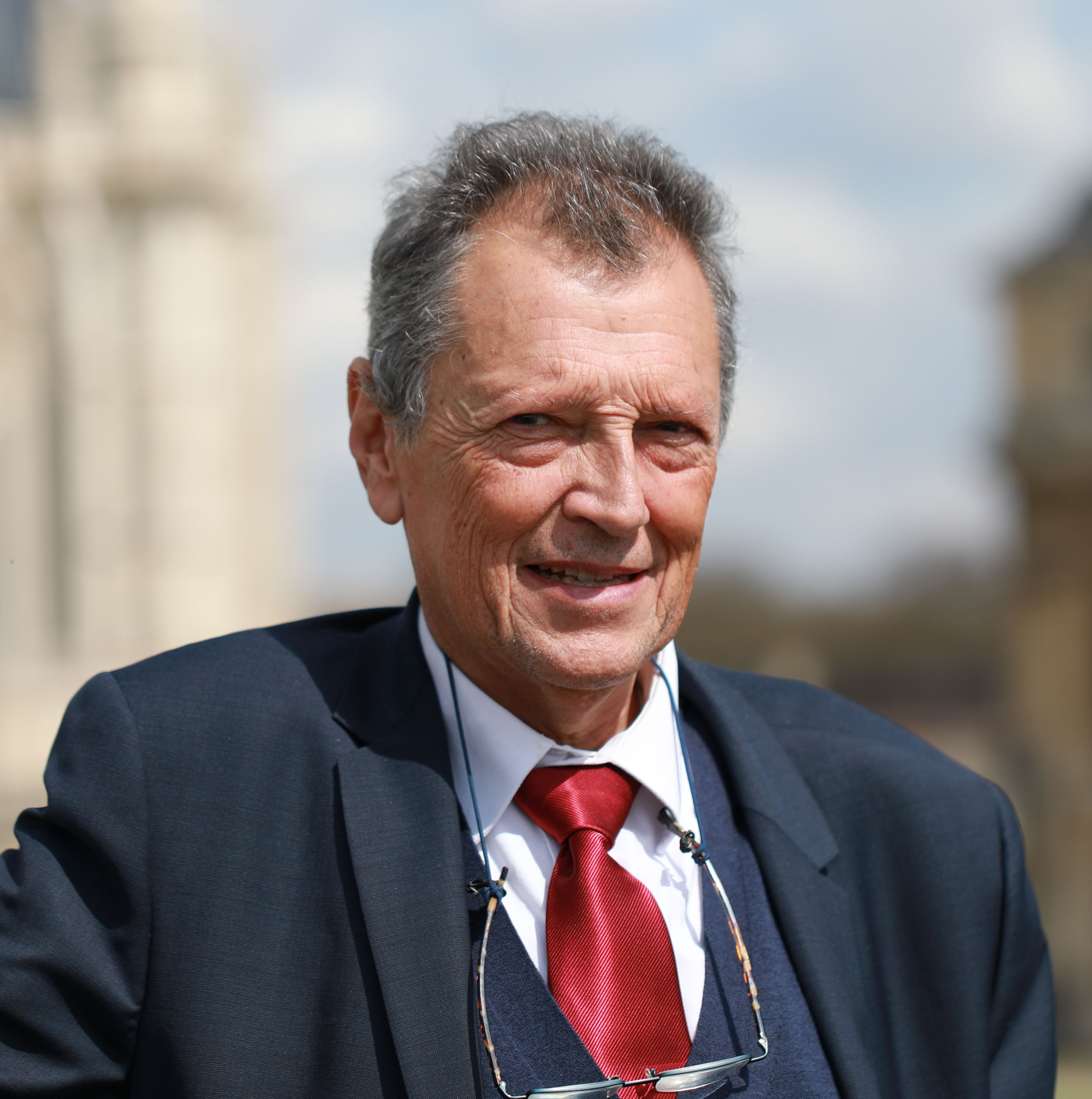
- Born: 28 October 1951 (age 74); Toulon, France

Academic background
- Education: School for Advanced Studies in the Social Sciences, EHESS; Paris X Nanterre
- Thesis: l'École Royale de Marine du Havre; Les officiers généraux de la marine royale

Academic work
- Discipline: history
- Sub-discipline: naval history
- Institutions: Université Savoie Mont Blanc; University of Tours
- Notable works: Dictionnaire d'histoire maritime

Michel Vergé-Franceschi (born 28 October 1951, Toulon) is a French naval historian.

== Biography ==
Michel Vergé-Franceschi started teaching History in secondary education at Le Havre (1975-1986) at collège Viviani, at the Lycée polyvalent Claude Monet, at the Lycée régional François 1er and at the Lycée Corneille in Rouen, Normandy, where he was also responsible for the academic plan for teaching History. He earned a PhD in History in 1980 with a dissertation l'École Royale de Marine du Havre (School for Advanced Studies in the Social Sciences, EHESS) and a second PhD in 1987 at Paris X Nanterre with Les officiers généraux de la marine royale. He then went on to head the Maritime History Laboratory of CNRS-Paris IV-Sorbonne-Musée national de la Marine, and teach as a Modern History professor at Université Savoie Mont Blanc at Chambéry (1986-2000)

From 2000, he taught at the University of Tours as an 18th-century specialist, focusing on the society, shipping and travels of the era. He was President of the Société française d'histoire maritime (French maritime History association) until 2005.

Vergé-Franceschi has published about 60 works, and edited the 2002 edition of the Dictionnaire d'histoire maritime.

== Works ==
- Vergé-Franceschi, Michel (2002). Dictionnaire d'Histoire maritime. Paris: Robert Laffont. ISBN 2-221-08751-8.

=== Les Officiers généraux de la Marine royale : 1715-1774 : origines, conditions, services ===
- Vergé-Franceschi, Michel (1990). Les Officiers généraux de la Marine royale : 1715-1774 : origines, conditions, services. Vol. 1 (Introduction. Sources. Bibliographie. Roturiers anoblis). Paris: Librairie de l'Inde. ISBN 2-905455-04-7.
- Vergé-Franceschi, Michel (1990). Les Officiers généraux de la Marine royale : 1715-1774 : origines, conditions, services. Vol. 2 (Roturiers. Faux-nobles.). Paris: Librairie de l'Inde. ISBN 2-905455-04-7.
- Vergé-Franceschi, Michel (1990). Les Officiers généraux de la Marine royale : 1715-1774 : origines, conditions, services. Vol. 3 (Normands. Poitevins). Paris: Librairie de l'Inde. ISBN 2-905455-04-7.
- Vergé-Franceschi, Michel (1990). Les Officiers généraux de la Marine royale : 1715-1774 : origines, conditions, services. Vol. 4 (Le littoral. L'intérieur.). Paris: Librairie de l'Inde. ISBN 2-905455-04-7.
- Vergé-Franceschi, Michel (1990). Les Officiers généraux de la Marine royale : 1715-1774 : origines, conditions, services. Vol. 5 (Les Parisiens. La Cour.). Paris: Librairie de l'Inde. ISBN 2-905455-04-7.
- Vergé-Franceschi, Michel (1990). Les Officiers généraux de la Marine royale : 1715-1774 : origines, conditions, services. Vol. 6 (Conclusion et index). Paris: Librairie de l'Inde. ISBN 2-905455-04-7.
- Vergé-Franceschi, Michel (1990). Les Officiers généraux de la Marine royale : 1715-1774 : origines, conditions, services. Vol. 7 (Annexes). Paris: Librairie de l'Inde. ISBN 2-905455-04-7.

=== Articles ===
- "Les amiraux français de la guerre d'Amérique (1778-1783)". VIIe Journées franco-britanniques d'histoire de la marine, Brest, 1998 (in French). Vincennes.: Service historique de la Marine. 1998.
