= French ship Vaillant (1755) =

French 64-gun ship of the line launched in 1756

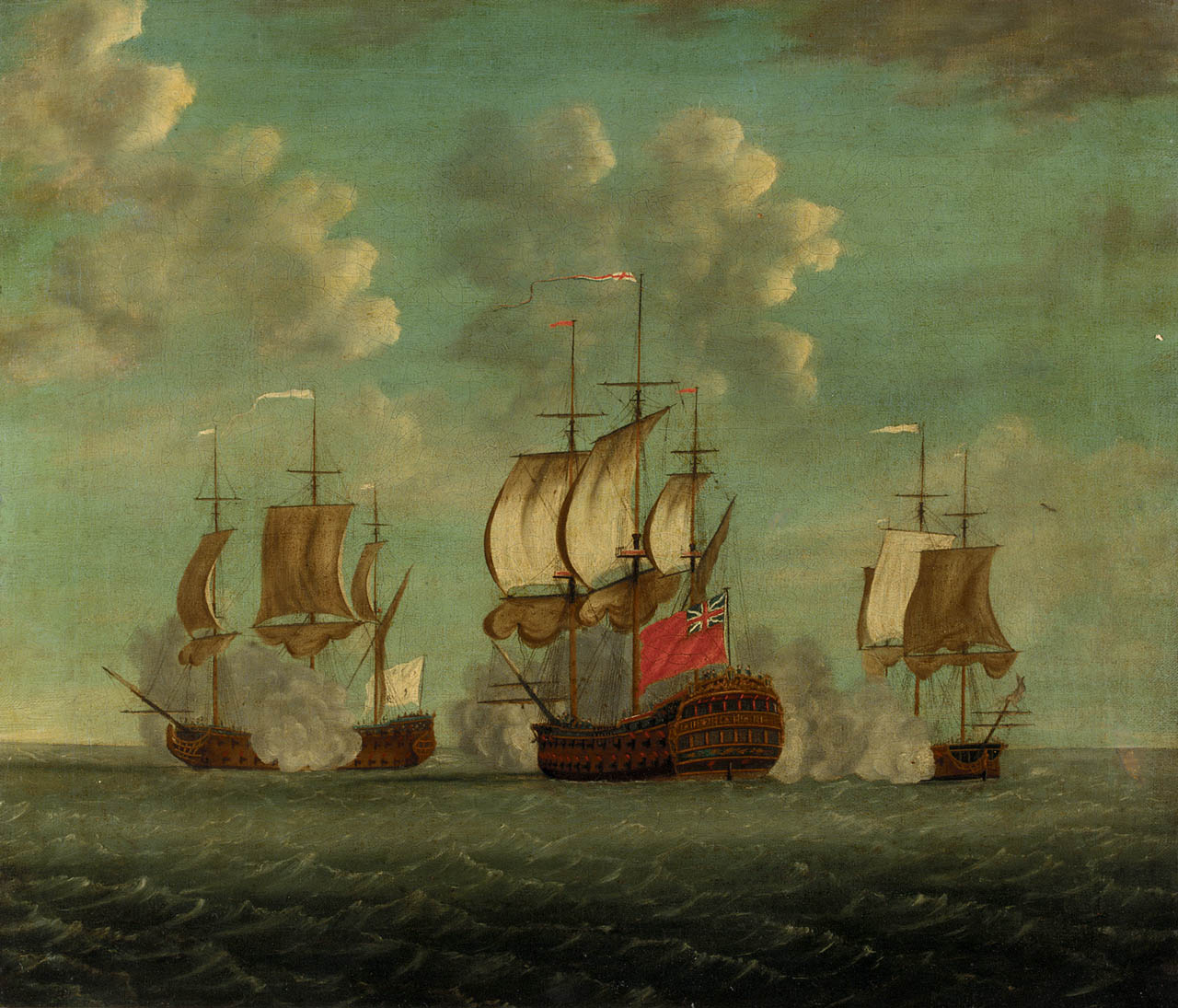

History

France
- Name: Vaillant
- Namesake: "Valliant"
- Ordered: 27 July 1752
- Builder: Toulon
- Laid down: November 1752
- Launched: 1 October 1755
- Decommissioned: 1783
- In service: June 1756
- Fate: Hulked 1783

General characteristics
- Class & type: Vaillant-class ship of the line.
- Displacement: 2200 tonneaux
- Tons burthen: 1150 port tonneaux
- Length: 49.1 metres
- Beam: 13.2 metres
- Draught: 6.9 metres
- Propulsion: Sail
- Complement: 450 men
- Armour: Timber

Vaillant was a 64-gun ship of the line of the French Navy, designed by Noël Pomet, and lead ship of her class.

== Career ==
In 1772, she was under La Brizollière, and bound for Saint Domingue, along with Actionnaire, Aurore and Sylphide. The year after, she was at Toulon under Oppède.

In 1777, she was under Chabert-Cogolin in Estaing's fleet. On 14 August 1778, along with Hector, she captured the 8-gun bomb vessel HMS Thunder at Sandy Hook. She took part in the Battle of Grenada on 6 July 1779. She returned to Lorient that same year. In November, she was part of a division off Savannah, along with Zélé and Marseillais, when the ships got separated.

In 1780, Seillans took command of Vaillant. The year after, she was under Bernard de Marigny.

In 1782, Sainte-Eulalie took command and sailed her back to France.

== Fate ==
Vaillant was hulked in Rochefort in 1783. From 1792, she was used as a masting crane.
