= Jean-Joseph de Rafélis de Broves =

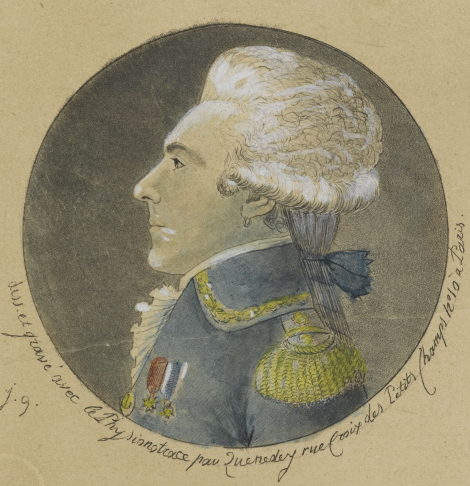
- Born: 8 July 1715 Brovès
- Died: 12 November 1782 (aged 67) Brovès
- Branch: French Navy
- Rank: Lieutenant général des Armées navales
- Conflicts: Seven Years' War; French conquest of Corsica; Battle of Rhode Island; Battle of Grenada; Siege of Savannah

Jean-Joseph de Rafélis de Broves (Brovès, 8 July 1715 — Brovès, 12 November 1782) was a French Navy officer. He served in the War of American Independence. He was a member of the Society of the Cincinnati, and Grand Cross in the Order of Saint Louis.

== Biography ==
Broves was born to a family of Provence. He was brother to Jean-François de Rafélis de Broves, and uncle to Charles François Auguste de Rafélis de Broves and to Joseph Barthélémy de Rafélis de Broves.

Broves joined the Navy as a Garde-Marine in 1730, and was promoted to Lieutenant in 1746. He served in the Navy during the Seven Years' War.

In 1765, he was promoted to Brigadier des Armées navales. He commanded the squadron of the French conquest of Corsica in 1768, and directed the French bombardment of Tunisia in 1770, with his flag on Provence. On 14 November 1770, he signed a peace treaty with Ali II ibn Hussein, in an effort to settle the question of the Barbary pirates.

In 1771, he was promoted to Chef d'escadre and made a Commander in the Order of Saint Louis. From 1772 to 1777, he continued to direct expeditions in the Mediterranean against privateers.

In 1778, he was appointed second in command under Estaing in the French expeditionary force for War of American Independence, with his flag on the 74-gun César. He took part in the Battle of Rhode Island, in the Battle of Grenada on 6 July 1779, and in the Siege of Savannah.

After Estaing was wounded at Savannah, Broves took effective command until the fleet returned to France in late 1779.

Returned to France, Broves was promoted to Lieutenant général des Armées navales.

== Sources and references ==
Notes

Bibliography

- Contenson, Ludovic (1934). La Société des Cincinnati de France et la guerre d'Amérique (1778-1783). Paris: éditions Auguste Picard. OCLC 7842336.
- Rafélis de Broves, Georges (1891). Les Rafélis (in French). Paris: Alais : Impr. J. Martin. OCLC 1124315313.
