= Battle of Fort Royal =

Part of the Anglo-French War (1781)

- Part of the Anglo-French War and the Anglo-French War (1778–1783)
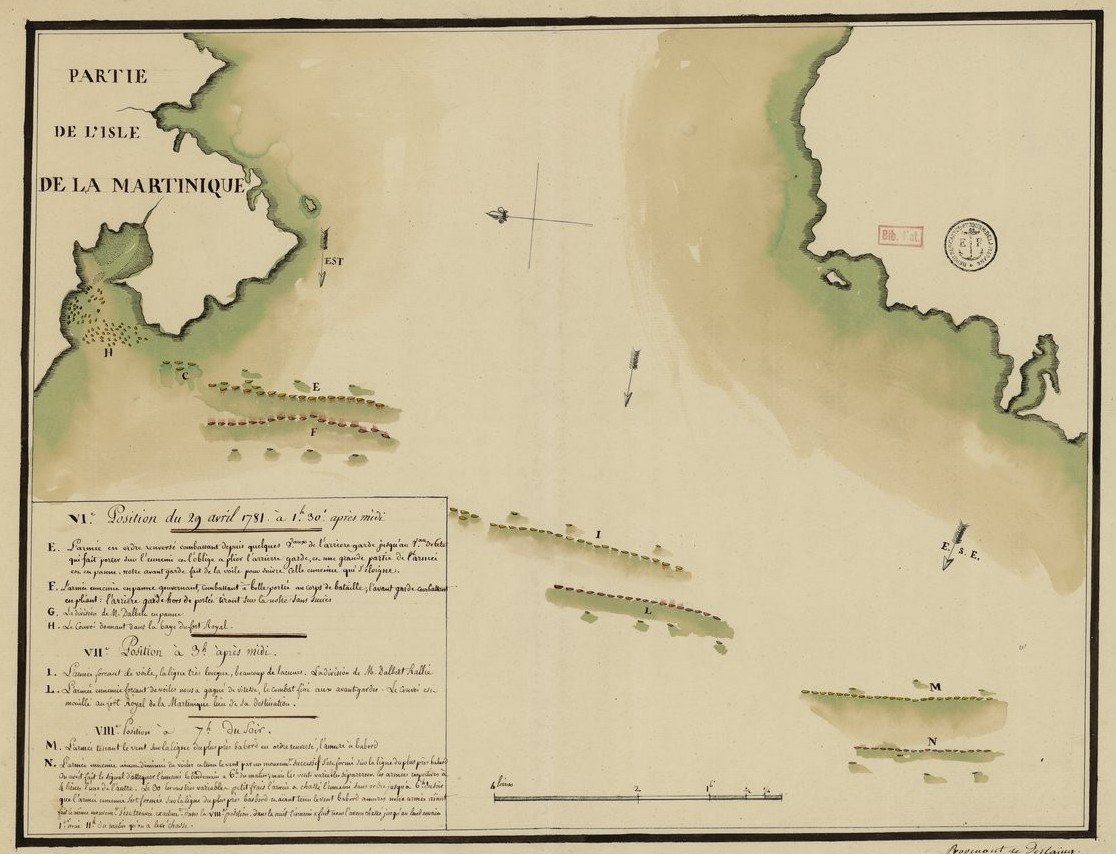
Date	29 April 1781 – 30 April 1781 (1 day)
Location	Off Martinique, West Indies 14°36′N 61°15′W
Result	French victory

Belligerents
Great Britain	France

Commanders and leaders
Samuel Hood	François Joseph Paul de Grasse

Strength
18 ships of the line	24 ships of the line

Casualties and losses
39 killed 162 wounded	Reports vary

The Battle of Fort Royal was a naval battle fought off Fort Royal, Martinique in the West Indies during the Anglo-French War on 29 April 1781, between fleets of the British Royal Navy and the French Navy. After an engagement lasting four hours, the British squadron under Admiral Samuel Hood broke off and retreated. Admiral de Grasse offered a desultory chase before seeing the French convoys safe to port.

== Background ==
In March 1781, a large French fleet under the command of Grasse left the port of Brest. Most of this fleet was headed for the West Indies. Of the 26 ships of the line, one was sent to North America, and five, under the command of the Suffren, were destined for India. The remaining twenty arrived off to Martinique on 28 April.

On 17 April, Grasse had detached a cutter which arrived at Martinique on 26 to inform Bouillé of his arrival. Before sailing to the lee (western) side of the island, Grasse anchored the fleet and sent someone ashore to gather news and bring orders to Albert de Saint-Hippolyte, commander of a 4-ship division that a British fleet of 17 ships of the line under Samuel Hood had been blockading at Fort Royal for 50 days. The division comprised the 74-gun Victoire, under Saint-Hippolyte, and the 64-gun Caton, under Framond, Réfléchi, under Cillart de Suville, and Solitaire, under Cicé-Champion.

Hood was under orders from the fleet's station commander, Admiral George Brydges Rodney, to maintain the blockade of the port on the lee side, despite his protests that this would put him at a disadvantage should any other fleet arrive. Though disadvantaged by his position and his inferior firepower, the fact that all of his ships had copper bottoms, which required little maintenance compared to the alternative, and that he was not burdened with the responsibility of escorting a convoy both allowed him to focus his efforts on maintaining the blockade.

== Battle ==
Grasse ordered his fleet to prepare for action on the morning of 29 April, and sailed for Fort Royal with the convoy ships hugging the coast and the armed ships in battle line. The French spotted Hood's fleet bearing towards them around 0800, but Grasse held the advantageous weather gauge from an East-North-East wind. At about 0920, Hood was joined by the Prince William, a 64-gun ship that had been at St. Lucia.

The two fleets continued to push for advantageous positions, however Hood's leeward position meant he was unable to prevent Grasse from bringing the convoy to the harbour, and Grasse's fleet and the four blockaded ships soon met. Around 1100, Grasse's van began firing at long range, with no effect. Saint-Hippolyte's division then set sail, leaving the harbour of Fort-Royal and making their junction with Grasse.

By 1230 the two fleets were aligned, but Grasse refused to take advantage of the weather gauge to close with Hood, despite Hood's efforts to bring the French to him, as doing so entailed risking his transports. The fleets then exchanged cannonades and broadsides for the next hour; at long range, the damage incurred was modest, although Centaur, Russell and Intrepid required repairs. Centaur had her captain, first officer and 10 others killed, and 26 wounded. The French suffered mostly light damage to their rigging.

From 1400, the French convoy slipped between the coast and Grasse's squadron, safely arriving at Martinique.

Hood finally drew away toward Saint Lucia. On 30, Grasse, having successfully completed his convoy escort, was free to give chase, and he harassed the British for a couple of days, but Hood refused to be brought to action. In the chase, the disparity of sailing performance between the French ships scattered Grasse's squadron, to the point that by 1 May, Grasse had only 11 ships with him and was losing sight of the last ones. He then returned to Fort-Royal, where he arrived on 6 May.

== Aftermath ==
Hood dispatched Russell, which had been holed below the waterline to St. Eustatius for repairs, and to bring news of the action to Admiral Rodney. Hood spent the next day in fruitless attempts to gain the windward and eventually made sail to the North. He met Rodney on 11 May between St. Kitts and Antigua, the latter having left Saint Eustatius on 5 May. Reports of French casualties vary from as few as 74 killed and wounded to more than 250.

== Order of battle ==
=== French fleet ===
Admiral de Grasse's fleet
Division	Ship	Guns	Commander	Casualties			Notes
Division	Ship	Guns	Commander	Killed	Wounded	Total	Notes
Blue-and-White squadron, under Bougainville
3rd Division	Languedoc	80	Jean-François d'Arros d'Argelos				Division flagship
3rd Division	Citoyen	74	Alexandre de Thy				
1st Division	Glorieux	74	Jacques François de Pérusse des Cars				
1st Division	Auguste	80	Louis Antoine de Bougainville (Chef d'escadre); Pierre-Joseph de Castellan (flag captain)				Division and Squadron flagship
2nd Division	Souverain	74	Jean-Baptiste de Glandevès du Castellet				
2nd Division	Diadème	74	Louis Augustin de Monteclerc				
Signals	Médée	32-gun frigate	Chevalier de Girardin				
White squadron, under Grasse
3rd Division	Zélé	74	Charles-René de Gras-Préville				
3rd Division	Scipion	74	Antoine Pierre de Clavel				
1st Division	Northumberland	74	Bon Chrétien de Briqueville				
1st Division	Ville de Paris	104	François Joseph Paul de Grasse (Lieutenant général); Pierre de Vaugiraud (Major general); Antoine Cresp (flag captain)				Division, Squadron and Fleet flagship
1st Division	Sceptre	74	Louis de Rigaud de Vaudreuil				
2nd Division	Hector	74	Laurent-Emmanuel de Renaud d'Aleins				
2nd Division	Magnanime	74	Jean Antoine Le Bègue de Germiny				
Signals	Diligente	26-gun frigate	Victurnien-Henri-Elzéar de Rochechouart de Mortemart				
Signals	Pandour	18-gun cutter	Étienne Marc Antoine Joseph de Grasse-Limermont				
Blue squadron, under Chabert
3rd Division	Bourgogne	74	Charles de Charritte				
3rd Division	Vaillant	64	Augustin Etienne Gaspard Bernard de Marigny				
1st Division	Marseillais	74	Henri-César de Castellane-Majastre				
1st Division	César	74	Charles Régis de Coriolis d'Espinouse				
1st Division	Saint-Esprit	80	Joseph-Bernard de Chabert-Cogolin				Division and Squadron flagship
2nd Division	Hercule	74	Jean-Baptiste Turpin du Breuil				
2nd Division	Pluton	74	François Hector d'Albert de Rions				
Signals	Aigrette	26-gun frigate	Jean-Baptiste Prévost de Sansac de Traversay				
Signals	Alerte	18-gun cutter	Gallien de Chabons				

Saint-Hippolyte's division
Division	Ship	Guns	Commander	Casualties			Notes
Division	Ship	Guns	Commander	Killed	Wounded	Total	Notes
	Victoire	74	Joseph François Auguste Jules d'Albert de Saint-Hippolyte				Division flagship
	Caton	64	Georges-François de Framond				
	Réfléchi	64	Armand-François Cillart de Suville				
	Solitaire	64	Louis-Toussaint Champion de Cicé				

=== British fleet ===
British order of battle as provided by Clowes, p. 482.

- Alfred, 74, Captain William Bayne
- Belliqueux, 64, Captain James Brine
- Alcide, 74, Captain Charles Thompson
- Invincible, 74, Captain Sir Richard Bickerton
- Monarch, 74, Captain Francis Reynolds
- Barfleur, 90, Captain John Knight, Rear-Admiral Samuel Hood
- Terrible, 74, Captain James Ferguson
- Princessa, 70, Captain Sir Thomas Rich
- Ajax, 74, Captain John Symons
- Resolution, 74, Captain Lord Robert Manners
- Montagu, 74, Captain John Houlton
- Gibraltar, 80, Captain Charles Knatchbull, Rear-Admiral Sir Francis Samuel Drake
- Centaur, 74, Captain John Neale Pleydell Nott
- Prince William, 64, Captain Stair Douglas
- Torbay, 74, Captain John Lewis Gidoin
- Intrepid, 64, Captain Anthony James Pye Molloy
- Shrewsbury, 74, Captain Mark Robinson
