= Battle of Martinique (1780) =

1780 battle of the American Revolutionary War

- Part of the American Revolutionary War
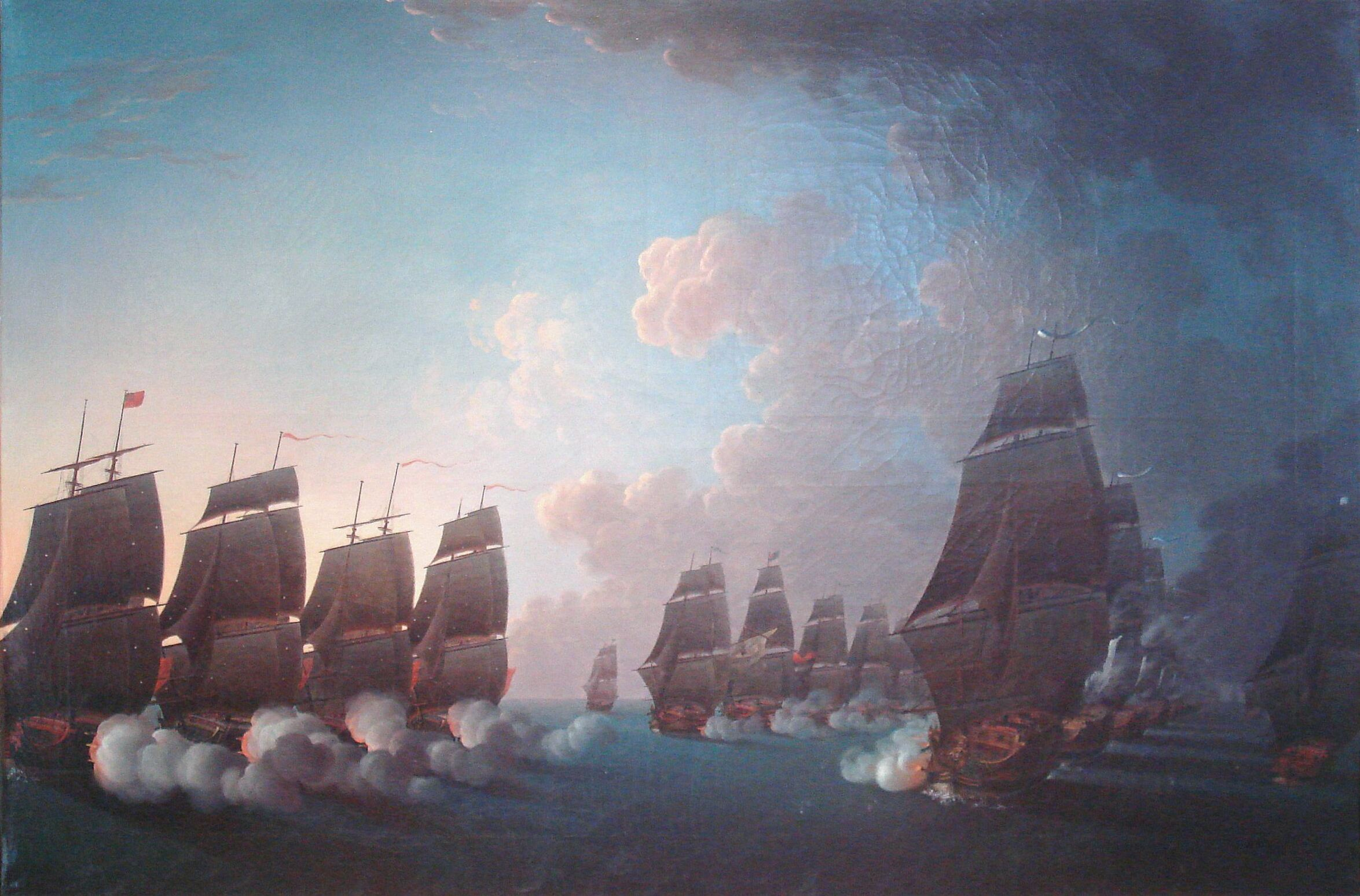
- Painting of the battle by Auguste-Louis de Rossel de Cercy
Date	17 April 1780
Location	Off Martinique, Caribbean Sea
Result	Inconclusive

Belligerents
Great Britain	France

Commanders and leaders
Sir George Rodney	Comte de Guichen

Strength
20 ships of the line	23 ships of the line

Casualties and losses
120 killed 354 wounded	222 killed 537 wounded

The Battle of Martinique, also known as the Battle of Dominica, took place on 17 April 1780 during the American Revolutionary War in the West Indies between the Royal Navy and the French Navy.

== Origins ==
In March 1780, the French chief commander for the West Indies and North America, Charles Henri Hector, Count of Estaing, was succeeded by Luc Urbain du Bouëxic, comte de Guichen. Together with François Claude Amour, marquis de Bouillé, de Guichen planned a combined attack on a British West Indies Island. On 13 April Guichen sailed from Martinique with a fleet of 23 ships of the line and 3,000 troops. The newly arrived British commander based in St. Lucia, Admiral of the White Sir George Rodney, was notified immediately of the French departure, and gave chase with 20 ships of the line. On 16 April, his sentinels spotted de Guichen westward of Martinique.

== Battle ==
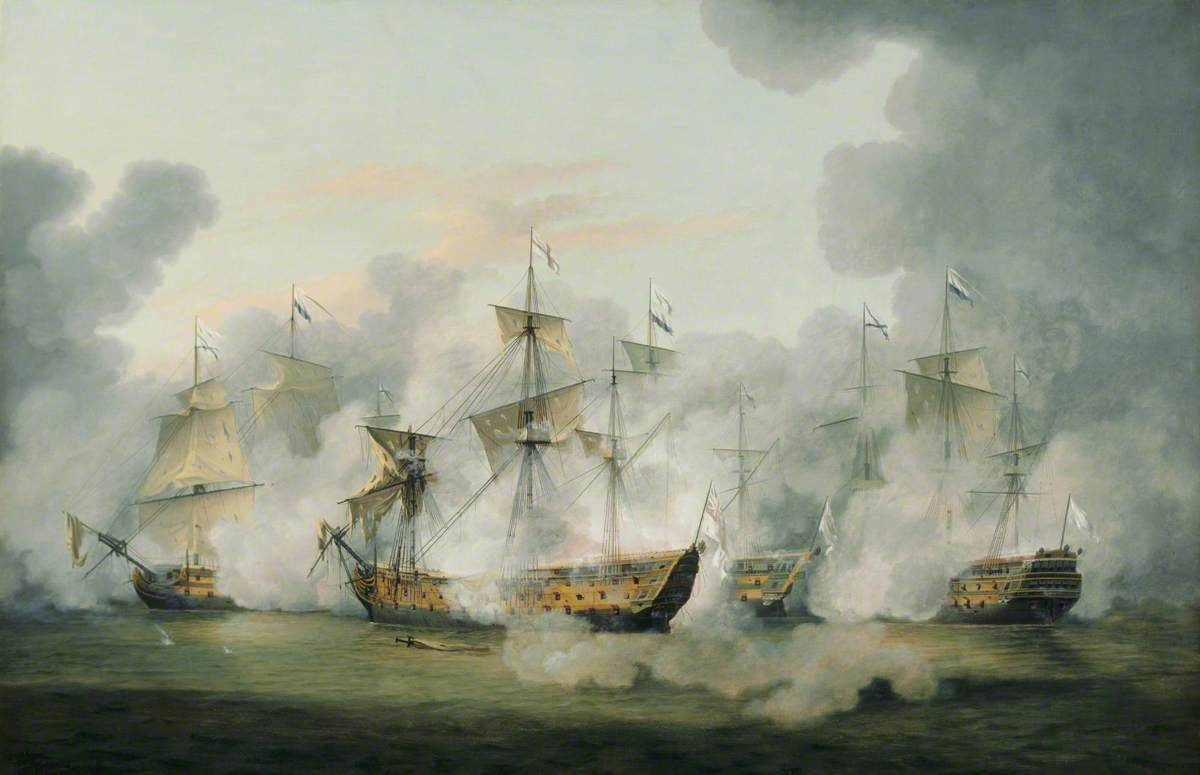
Painting of the battle by Thomas Luny

The fleets began manoeuvring for the advantage of the weather gage on the morning of 17 April. By 8:45, Rodney had reached a position to the windward of de Guichen, in a relatively close formation. To escape the danger to his rear, de Guichen ordered his line to wear and sail to the north, stringing out the line in the process. This forced Rodney to go through another series of manoeuvres to regain his position, which he did by late morning. At this point, he hoped to engage the rear and centre of de Guichen's elongated line, concentrating his power to maximize damage there before de Guichen's van could join the action. The signal that Rodney issued was for each ship to engage the appropriate ship it was paired with according to the disposition of the two fleets. He issued this signal with the understanding that his captains would execute it in the context of signals given earlier in the day that the enemy's rear was the target of the attack.

Unfortunately for the British, Robert Carkett (the commander of the lead ship HMS Stirling Castle) either misunderstood the signal or had forgotten the earlier one, and moved ahead to engage de Guichen's van; he was followed by the rest of Rodney's fleet, and the two lines ended up engaging ship to ship. Thanks to the orderly fashion in which de Guichen's subordinate squadron-commanders dealt with the crisis, especially the third-in-command Comte de Grasse's rapid closing-up of the battle-line, de Guichen managed to extricate himself from a difficult situation and instead turn a narrow defeat to a drawn battle, although his and Marquis de Bouillé's objective to attack and seize Jamaica was thwarted. During the battle, both Rodney's Sandwich passed through the French line of ships, and was heavily engaged by the Couronne, Triomphant, and Fendant, for the next hour and a half before the French ships disengaged.

== Aftermath ==
Alfred Thayer Mahan wrote, "Rodney always considered this action of April 17th, 1780, to have been the great opportunity of his life; and his wrath was bitter against those by whose misconduct he conceived it had been frustrated." David Hannay, the author of the biography on the Comte de Guichen in the 11th edition of the Encyclopædia Britannica, stated that Guichen had shown himself very skillful in handling a fleet throughout the campaign, and although there was no marked success, he had at least prevented Rodney from attacking the French colonies in the Antilles.

On 15 May, both fleets encountered each other again, and again on 19 May. Both encounters were indecisive, with the French returning to Fort Royal, and the British to St. Lucia and Barbados. On 5 July, De Guichen departed Fort Royal, and ignoring entreaties to join Lafayette on the continent, departed for Europe on 16 Aug. Rodney, assuming de Guichen had headed for the continent before the hurricane season started, sailed for South Carolina, before arriving Sandy Hook on 14 September. On 16 November, Rodney returned to the West Indies.

== Order of battle ==
=== British fleet ===
Admiral Rodney's fleet
Division	Ship	Guns	Commander	Casualties			Notes
Division	Ship	Guns	Commander	Killed	Wounded	Total	Notes
Van
	Stirling Castle	64	Captain Robert Carkett				
	Ajax	74	Captain Samuel Uvedale				
	Elizabeth	74	Captain Frederick Maitland				
	Princess Royal	90	Rear-Admiral Hyde Parker; Captain Harry Harmood				
	Albion	74	Captain George Bowyer				
	Terrible	74	Captain John Leigh Douglas				
	Trident	64	Captain Anthony James Pye Molloy				
	Greyhound	28	Captain Archibald Dickson				Frigate
Centre
	Grafton	74	Commodore Thomas Collingwood; Captain Thomas Newnham				
	Yarmouth	64	Captain Nathaniel Bateman				
	Cornwall	74	Captain Timothy Edwards				
	Sandwich	90	Admiral Sir George Rodney; Captain Walter Young				
	Suffolk	74	Captain Hugh Cloberry Christian				
	Boyne	70	Captain Charles Cotton				
	Vigilant	64	Captain Sir George Home				
	Venus	36	Captain James Ferguson				Repeating ship
	Pegasus	28	Captain John Bazely				Frigate
	Deal Castle	20	Captain William Fooks				Frigate
Rear
	Vengeance	74	Commodore William Hotham; Captain John Holloway				
	Medway	60	Captain William Affleck				
	Montagu	74	Captain John Houlton				
	Conqueror	74	Rear-Admiral Joshua Rowley; Captain Thomas Watson				
	Intrepid	64	Captain Henry St John †				
	Magnificent	74	Captain John Elphinstone				
	Centurion	50	Captain Richard Braithwaite				To assist the rear "in case of need"
	Andromeda	28	Captain Henry Byrne				Frigate

=== French fleet ===
Admiral Guichen's fleet
Division	Ship	Guns	Commander	Casualties			Notes
Division	Ship	Guns	Commander	Killed	Wounded	Total	Notes
Escadre bleue et blanche
	Destin	74	Captain François-Louis du Maitz de Goimpy				
	Vengeur	64	Captain Jean-Georges du Croiset de Retz				
	Saint Michel	60	Captain the Chevalier d'Aymar				
	Pluton	74	Captain Joseph Léon de La Marthonie				
	Triomphant	80	Chef d'Escadre Hippolyte de Sade de Vaudronne; Captain Charles-René de Gras-Préville				Flag
	Souverain	74	Captain Jean-Baptiste de Glandevès du Castellet				
	Solitaire	64	Captain Louis-Toussaint Champion de Cicé				
	Citoyen	74	Captain Armand-Claude Poute de Nieuil				
Escadre blanche
	Caton	64	Captain Georges-François de Framond				
	Victoire	74	Captain Joseph François Auguste Jules d'Albert de Saint-Hippolyte				
	Fendant	74	Chef d'Escadre Louis-Philippe de Rigaud, Marquis de Vaudreuil				
	Couronne	80	Lieutenant-General Luc Urbain du Bouëxic, comte de Guichen; Captain Pierre-Louis François Buor de La Charoulière				Fleet flagship
	Palmier	74	Captain François-Aymar de Monteil				
	Indien	64	Captain Jean-François de la Cour de Balleroy				
	Actionnaire	64	Captain Jean-François Gilart de Larchantel				
Escadre bleue
	Intrépide	74	Captain Louis Guillaume de Parscau du Plessix				
	Triton	64	Captain the Chevalier de Boades				
	Magnifique	74	Captain François-Louis de Brach				
	Robuste	74	Chef d'Escadre François Joseph Paul de Grasse				Squadron flagship
	Sphinx	74	Captain Claude-René Pâris de Soulanges				
	Artésien	64	Captain Antoine de Thomassin de Peynier				
	Hercule	74	Captain Claude-François Renart d'Amblimont				
