= Charles Régis de Coriolis d'Espinouse =

French Navy officer of the War of American Independence

- Born: 1726
- Died: 1793 (aged 66–67)
- Branch: French Navy
- Rank: Chef d'Escadre
- Conflicts: War of American Independence; Battle of the Chesapeake; Battle of Saint Kitts; Siege of Brimstone Hill; Battle of the Saintes

Charles Régis de Coriolis d'Espinouse (1726–1793) was a French Navy officer. He served in the War of American Independence.

== Biography ==
Coriolis d'Espinouse was born to the family of Aix-en-Provence. He joined the Navy as Garde-Marine on 1 July 1741, and was promoted to Lieutenant on 11 February 1756. In 1764, he commanded the xebec Requin, ferrying troops to Corsica. In 1769 and 1770, he captained the brand-new 18-gun corvette Flèche, based in Toulon.

He was promoted to captain on 15 November 1771. In 1776, he commanded the 34-gun frigate Aurore, cruising off Algiers, Majorca and Tunis.

In 1778, he commanded the 64-gun Caton, part of the squadron under Louis de Fabry de Fabrègues, along with the 74-gun Destin and Victoire, the 64-gun Hardi and Lion, and the frigates Gracieuse and Flore.

In 1779, Coriolis d'Espinouse was promoted to the command of the 74-gun Destin, part of the Blue squadron of the fleet under Orvilliers.

In 1781, he commanded the 74-gun César, which he captained at the Battle of the Chesapeake on 5 September 1781. He was promoted to Chef d'Escadre on 12 January 1782. He took part in the Battle of Saint Kitts on 24 and 25 January 1782, and in the Siege of Brimstone Hill and subsequent French invasion of Saint Kitts.

Later in 1782, Coriolis d'Espinouse transferred to the 80-gun Duc de Bourgogne. He captained her at the Battle of the Saintes on 12 April 1782.
