= John Knight (Royal Navy officer) =

Royal Navy Admiral (bap. 1747–1831)

Admiral Sir John Knight KCB
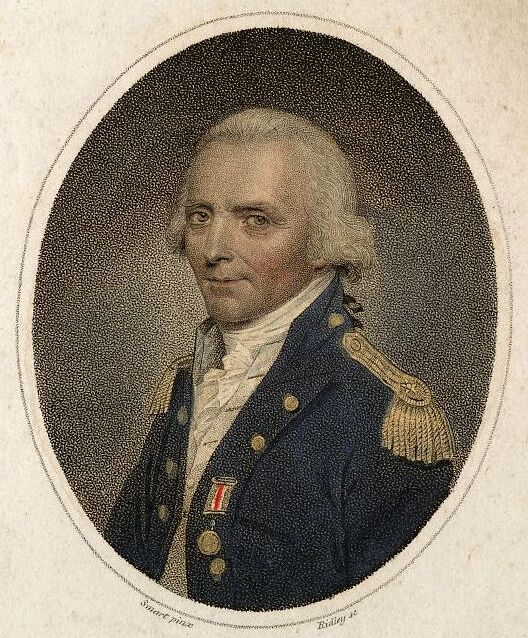
- Born: bap. 21 February 1747; Dundee, Scotland
- Died: 16 June 1831; Soberton, Hampshire
- Military career
- Allegiance: United Kingdom
- Branch: Royal Navy
- Service years: 1758–1815
- Rank: Admiral
- Conflicts: Seven Years' War; Raid on Cherbourg; American Revolutionary War; Battle of Fort Royal; Battle of the Chesapeake; Battle of St. Kitts; Battle of the Saintes; French Revolutionary Wars; Battle of Camperdown; Napoleonic Wars
- Awards: Knight Commander of the Order of the Bath

Admiral Sir John Knight, KCB (bap. 21 February 1747 – 16 June 1831) was a senior British Royal Navy officer during the late eighteenth and nineteenth centuries most noted for his activities as a post captain during the American and French Revolutionary Wars. Serving with the Caribbean Fleet during the American war, Knight fought several significant battles and was commended for his service and made tutor of the young Prince William. During the French wars he served with the North Sea fleet under Admiral Adam Duncan and was engaged at the Battle of Camperdown against the Dutch. During the Napoleonic Wars that followed he held a senior administrative role at Gibraltar and retired in 1815 to his home and eight children. Although Knight was respected professionally, he was not popular with his men and fellow officers and was criticised for his ability to maintain discipline and for his close relationship with his family which some suggested had a negative impact on his performance as an officer.

== Life ==
John Knight was born in Dundee in February 1747, the son of Rear-Admiral Joseph Knight and his wife, Jean Hay. In 1758, aged 11, he followed his father into service with the Royal Navy aboard HMS Tartar, participating in the Raid on Cherbourg that year during the Seven Years' War. Knight remained with his father for five more years, until moving at the end of the war in 1763 to HMS Romney on the North American station. Off North America, Knight participated in surveying operations and although he returned to Europe some years later, he went back to North America in 1775 at the start of the American Revolutionary War.

Serving on the sloop HMS Falcon, Knight witnessed the Battle of Bunker Hill while anchored off Boston, and in 1776 he was captured in an attack on an American schooner. He was exchanged in December 1776 and given the independent hired vessel HMS Haerlem to conduct raiding operations along the Eastern Seaboard. In 1777 he was aboard Lord Howe's flagship HMS Eagle, and his knowledge of the coast played a vital part in Howe outmanoeuvring the French fleet of d'Estaing. The same year he married a woman named Prudence Reynolds in America, with whom he would have eight children, and in February 1778 he returned to Britain.

In 1780, Knight returned to the Americas again aboard HMS Barfleur and participated in the Battle of Fort Royal and the Battle of the Chesapeake, briefly becoming post captain in command of HMS Shrewsbury in 1782 before returning to Barfleur as captain and fighting at the Battle of St. Kitts and the Battle of the Saintes. He was responsible for the final blows and surrender of the French flagship "Ville de Paris" on 12 April 1782.

At the end of the war, Knight remained in command of Barfleur and was given personal responsibility for the naval education of the young Prince William who served aboard.

After the outbreak of the French Revolutionary Wars, Knight had periods in command of Barfleur in the Channel Fleet and HMS Victory in the Mediterranean, before taking over HMS Montagu with the North Sea fleet. At the Nore Mutiny in 1797, Montagu was heavily involved, but Knight resumed command once the uprising had collapsed, and in October he was engaged at the Battle of Camperdown against the Dutch fleet. In 1798 he commanded a squadron off Ireland and the following year was in command of the blockade squadron off Brest. He also remarried, his first wife having died sometime previously, to a widow named Love Pickman Oliver. In 1801 Knight was promoted to rear-admiral, and in 1805 during the Napoleonic Wars he was named as commander at Gibraltar, where he remained for another ten years until the war's end in 1815 when he retired from the Navy as a full admiral and a Knight Commander of the Order of the Bath.

He settled with his family at Woodend House in Soberton, Hampshire, and died there in June 1831. Although he was respected professionally, Knight was not popular with his men or his fellow officers. Discipline aboard his ship was considered poor by naval standards, and his habit of bringing his wife and children to sea with him was criticised.

Knight Inlet, on the coast of British Columbia Canada was named for him by Broughton who was imprisoned along with Knight in 1776.
