= Laurent-Emmanuel de Renaud d'Aleins =

French Navy officer of the War of American Independence

Laurent-Emmanuel de Renaud d'Aleins (Note: Also written "Renaud d'Allen".) (Alleins, 12 July 1739 — ) was a French Navy officer. He served in the War of American Independence.

== Biography ==
Aleins was born to a noble family of Salon de Provence. He joined the Navy as a Garde-Marine in 1750. He was promoted to Lieutenant in 1764 and to Captain in 1777.

Aleins captained the 74-gun Hector at the Battle of Fort Royal on 29 April 1781 and at the Battle of the Chesapeake on 5 September 1781. He took part in the Battle of the Saintes on 12 April 1782 as captain of the 74-gun Neptune.

He served as Albert de Rions' flag captain during the naval review held for Louis XVI in Cherbourg in 1786. That same year, he was promoted to Chef de Division.

== Sources and references ==
Notes

Citations

References

- Contenson, Ludovic (1934). La Société des Cincinnati de France et la guerre d'Amérique (1778-1783). Paris: éditions Auguste Picard. OCLC 7842336.
- Lacour-Gayet, Georges (1905). La marine militaire de la France sous le règne de Louis XVI. Paris: Honoré Champion. OCLC 763372623.
- Kerguelen, Yves-Joseph (1796). Relation des combats et des évènements de la guerre maritime de 1778 entre la France et l'Angleterre (in French). Imprimerie de Patris.
- Troude, Onésime-Joachim (1867). Batailles navales de la France (in French). Vol. 2. Challamel ainé. OCLC 836362484.
