= Georges-François de Framond =

French Navy officer of the War of American Independence

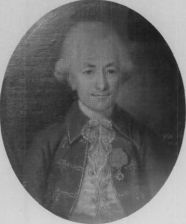
- Born: 4 February 1733 Grèzes, Lozère, France
- Died: 28 September 1785 (aged 52) Montargis, France
- Branch: French Navy
- Rank: brigadier des armées navales
- Conflicts: War of American Independence; Battle of Martinique; Battle of Fort Royal; Battle of the Chesapeake; Battle of the Mona Passage

Georges-François Godefroy de Framond de La Framondie, Count of Framond (Note: Also spelt "Faramond", or, erroneously, "Framont".) (4 February 1733, in Grèzes, Lozère — 28 September 1785, in Montargis) was a French Navy officer and aristocrat. He served in the War of American Independence, earning membership in the Society of the Cincinnati.

== Biography ==
Framond was born to the family of Jeanne Marie Elisabeth Césarine de Rochefort d'Ailly, and of Louis François Framond de Grèzes, from Gévaudan. His brothers Charles-Auguste Framond de Grèzes and Étienne Aimé François Framond de La Framondie also served in the Navy. Framond joined the Navy as a Garde-Marine in 1748. he was promoted to Lieutenant in 1757.

In 1765, Framond commanded the 20-gun xebec Caméléon during the Larache expedition.

In 1770, he was made a Knight in the Order of Saint Louis. In 1773, Framond was first officer on the 74-gun Protecteur, for a journey from Brest to Toulon. In 1776, he commanded the 26-gun frigate Mignonne for missions to Greece and Cyprus.

Framond was promoted to Captain in 1778, and given command of the 32-gun Sultane. He cruised between Cyprus and Toulon, ferrying diplomatic despatches.

In 1780, he captained the 64-gun Caton, part of the squadron under Guichen. Caton was later attached to the squadron commanded by De Grasse. He took part in the Battle of Martinique on 17 April 1780, as well as in the two smaller engagements of 15 and 19 May 1780.

At the Battle of Fort Royal, on 29 April 1781, Caton was one of the four ships to come reinforce the squadron under De Grasse, along with Victoire, Réfléchi and Solitaire. He took part in the Battle of the Chesapeake on 5 September 1781, where he was wounded.

On 24 March 1782, he was promoted to Chef de Division. On 10 April 1782, in the run-up to the Battle of the Saintes, Caton found herself becalmed and Framond asked for assistance. Despite having been sent a frigate, Framond decided to anchor at Basse-Terre without authorisation from his hierarchy. He thus failed to take part in the Battle of the Saintes, and a few days after, on 19 April 1782, Caton was captured at the Battle of the Mona Passage.

Framond was court-martialed on 27 February 1783 and found guilty. He was expelled from the Navy and imprisoned at Château de Ham to serve a life sentence. On 26 February 1785, he was released and ordered to live at Saint-Jean-Pied-de-Port. He died in October of that same year.

== Sources and references ==
Notes

Citations

References

- Contenson, Ludovic (1934). La Société des Cincinnati de France et la guerre d'Amérique (1778-1783). Paris: éditions Auguste Picard. OCLC 7842336.
- Lacour-Gayet, Georges (1910). La marine militaire de la France sous le règne de Louis XVI. Paris: Honoré Champion. pp. 431–434.
- Troude, Onésime-Joachim (1867). Batailles navales de la France (in French). Vol. 2. Challamel ainé.
