= William Bayne (Royal Navy officer) =

Royal Navy officer (died 1782)

Captain William Bayne
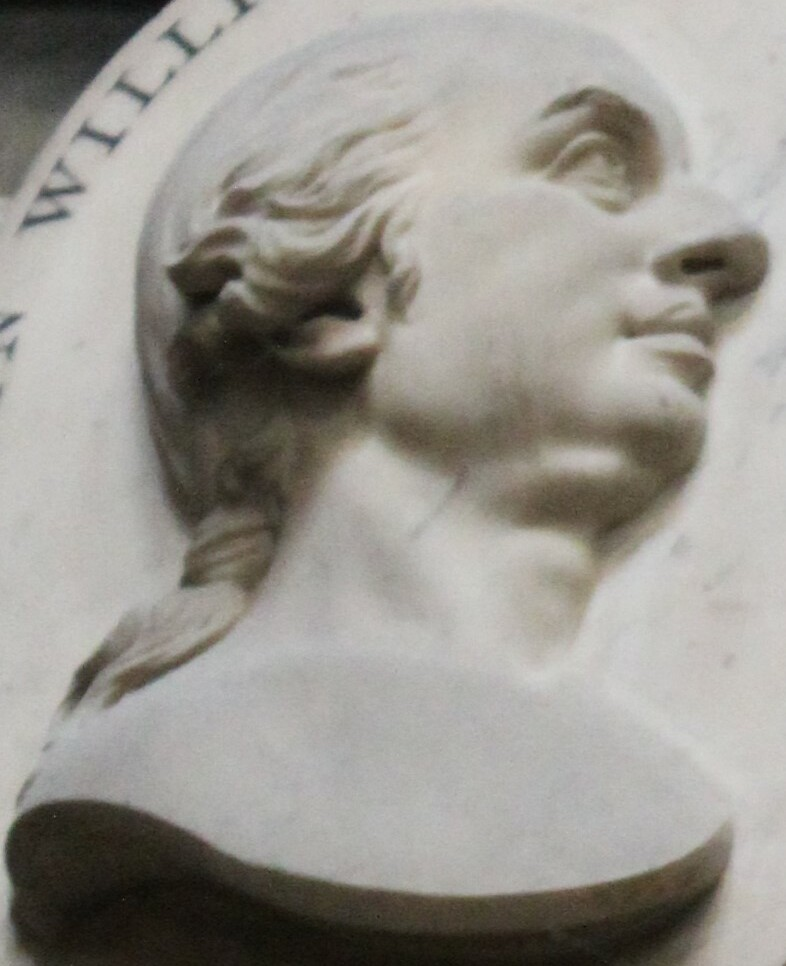
- Died: 9 April 1782; Aboard HMS Alfred, prior to the Battle of the Saintes
- Military career
- Allegiance: Great Britain
- Branch: Royal Navy
- Service years: – 1782
- Rank: Captain
- Commands: HMS Woolwich; HMS Stag; HMS Alfred
- Conflicts: Seven Years' War; British expedition against Martinique; American Revolutionary War; Battle of Fort Royal; Battle of the Chesapeake; Battle of Saint Kitts; Battle of the Saintes

William Bayne (died 9 April 1782), was an officer of the Royal Navy. He saw service during the Seven Years' War and the American War of Independence, being killed in action in a brief engagement prior to the Battle of the Saintes.

== Seven Years' War ==
Bayne became a lieutenant on 5 April 1749; in 1755 he served in that rank on board HMS Torbay, in North American waters, with Admiral Edward Boscawen, and in November 1756 was advanced to the command of a sloop of war. In 1760 he was promoted to post captain and given command of the 44-gun HMS Woolwich, and served in that ship at the reduction of Martinique in 1762, and continued there aboard the frigate HMS Stag, under the command of Vice-Admiral George Brydges Rodney.

== American War of Independence ==
After this he had no command until 1778, when he was appointed to the newly built 74-gun HMS Alfred, and served in the Channel Fleet through 1779 and 1780. He afterwards went to the West Indies as part of the squadron with Sir Samuel Hood, and was present in the action off Fort Royal in Martinique on 29 April 1781, and in the action off the Chesapeake on 5 September. Owing to the faulty system of tactics then in vogue and almost compulsory, the Alfred had no active share in either of these battles, the circumstances of which were afterwards much discussed.

On returning to the West Indies the Alfred was with Sir Samuel Hood at the Battle of Saint Kitts, where she accidentally fouled the frigate HMS Nymphe, cutting her down to the water, and losing her own bowsprit. This delayed the fleet at the very critical moment when Hood had proposed an unexpected attack on the French at anchor. No blame was attached to Captain Bayne for the accident, which was mainly due to the darkness of the night. Bayne quickly refitted his ship and resumed his station in the line, which won him credit, as did his distinguished conduct in the battle. When the fleet was reunited under the flag of Sir George Rodney, the Alfred continued under the immediate orders of Sir Samuel Hood, and with other ships of Hood's division was engaged in the partial action with the French on 9 April 1782, just prior to the Battle of the Saintes. It was little more than a distant interchange of fire between the respective vans; but one shot carried off Captain Bayne's leg about mid-thigh. Before a tourniquet could be applied, he was dead. To his memory, jointly with that of Captains William Blair and Lord Robert Manners, who were killed in the battle three days later, a national monument was placed in Westminster Abbey.

== Sources ==
Attribution:

- This article incorporates text from a publication now in the public domain: "Bayne, William". Dictionary of National Biography. London: Smith, Elder & Co. 1885–1900.
