= Joseph-Bernard de Chabert-Cogolin =

French Navy officer of the War of American Independence

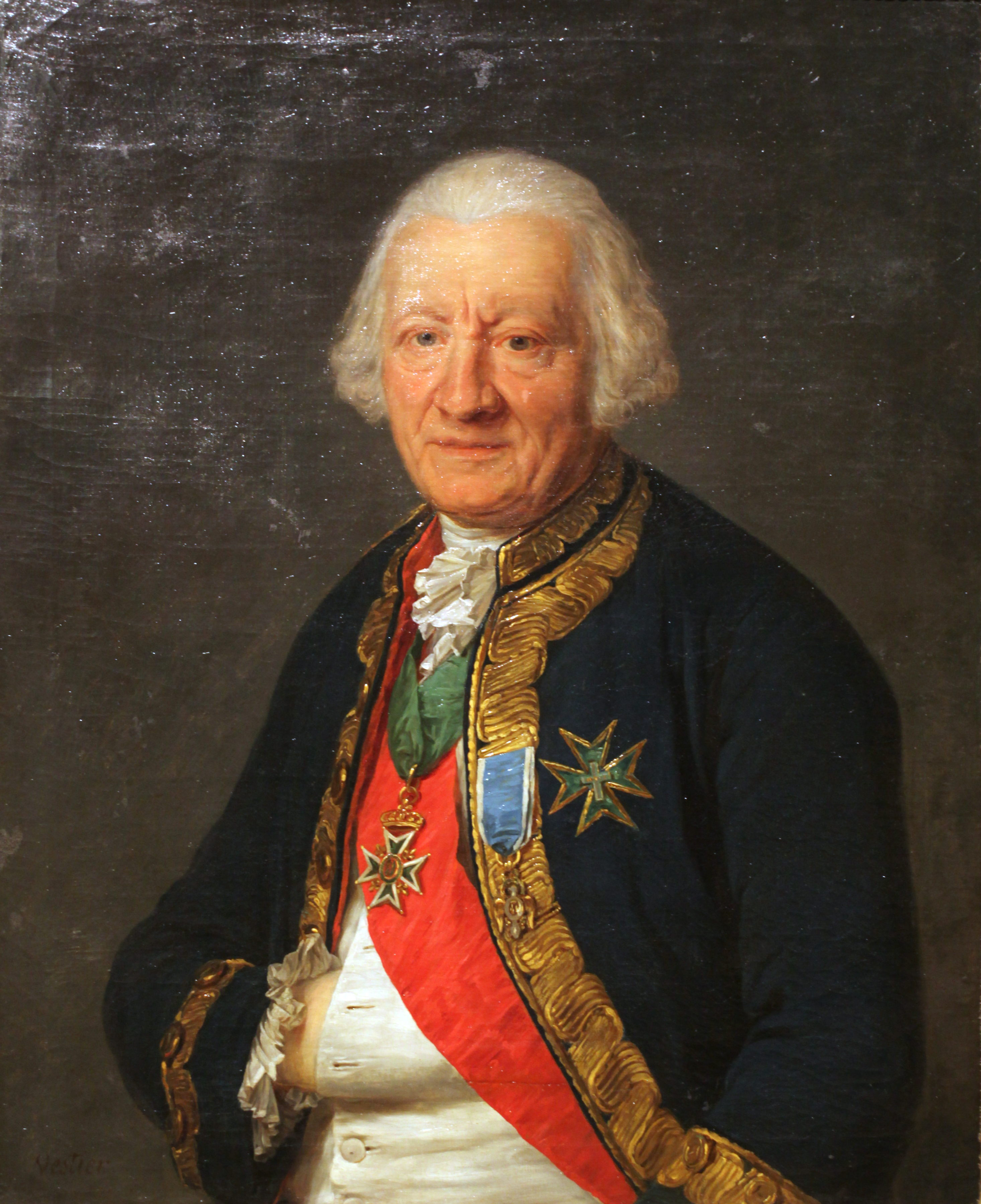
- Born: 28 February 1724; Toulon, France
- Died: 2 December 1805
- Branch: French Navy; Armée des Princes
- Battles / wars: First Battle of Cape Finisterre; Battle of Minorca; Battle of St. Lucia; Battle of Grenada; Siege of Savannah; Battle of Fort Royal; Battle of the Chesapeake; Invasion of Tobago; Siege of Brimstone Hill

Joseph-Bernard de Chabert-Cogolin (French pronunciation: [ʒozɛf bɛʁnaʁ də ʃabɛʁ kɔɡɔlɛ̃]; 28 February 1724, in Toulon – 2 December 1805 (Note: Taillemite gives the date of 2 December 1805, and Doneaud Du Plan adds that the day coincides with that of the Battle of Austerlitz.)) was a French Navy officer. He served in the War of American Independence.

== Biography ==
Cillart was born to the family of Madeleine de Bernard and of Joseph-François de Chabert, a Navy officer. He joined the Navy as a Garde-Marine in 1741, and took part in the Battle of Toulon at Cape Sicié on 22–23 February 1744, serving on the 50-gun Diamant. In 1745, he served on Trident and Espérance in two missions to Martinique. In 1746, he was on Castor and took part in the capture of the British corvette Albany off Acadia. The year after, he was taken prisoner at the First Battle of Cape Finisterre on 14 May 1747. Chabert was promoted to Ensign in 1748.

In 1750 and 1751, Chabert conducted a survey of the coasts of Northern America. In 1753, he published and account of the expedition, Voyage fait par ordre du Roi en 1750 et 1751 dans l'Amérique septentrionale pour rectifier les cartes de l'Arcadie de l'Isle Royale et de l'Isle de Terre Neuve, et pour en fixer les principaux points par des observations astronomiques. That same year, Chabert was sent to Carthagena to observe the solar eclipse or 26 October.

Chabert was promoted to Lieutenant in 1756. He took part in the Battle of Minorca on 20 May 1756, commanding Hirondelle in La Galissonière's squadron.

In 1758, he was appointed to the Geography office at Versailles (dépôt des cartes). the year after, he was accepted as a member of the Académie de Marine, replacing Florent-Jean de Vallière who had died in January 1759.

Chabert was promoted to Commander in 1764. On 2 April 1771, Chabert was given command of the frigate Mignonne, and conducted a cruise to test a chronometer made by Ferdinand Berthoud. Upon his return in late November, Chabert was promoted to Captain.

From June to December 1776, he commanded the 32-gun frigate Atalante in an expedition to test marine chronometers and survey the coasts of Sicily and Greece. On 16 July, off the Mani Peninsula, near Koroni, pirates attacked Atalante with musket fire, and Chabert was gravely wounded when a bullet struck his left cheek and exited from under the ear.

In 1778, Chabert captained the 64-gun Vaillant in the squadron of D'Estaing. He took part in the Battle of St. Lucia on 15 December 1778, and in the Battle of Grenada on 6 July 1779. On 28 August 1779, D'Estaing's squadron arrived at Boston, and Chabert installed mortars on Gallops Island for the defence of Boston harbour. In October, Chabert took part in the Siege of Savannah.

Chabert captained the 80-gun Saint-Esprit in the squadron under De Grasse. He took part in the Battle of Fort Royal on 29 and 30 April 1781, and in the Battle of the Chesapeake on 5 September 1781, where he was wounded. He later fought in the Invasion of Tobago in May and June 1781, and in the Siege of Brimstone Hill and subsequent capture of Saint Kitts in January and February 1782. On 19 April 1782, Saint-Esprit departed Fort Royal to make her junction with Vaudreuil's squadron, which she met on 17 May. From there, she returned to Lorient in September as part of a 4-ship squadron under Saint-Hippolyte, escorting a 120-ship convoy.

Chabert was promoted to Chef d'Escadre on 12 January 1782 The same year, he rose to Ordinary member of the Académie de Marine.

In 1783, he authored a report about marine chronometers for the Académie des Sciences, a key element in the History of longitude. In 1785, he was elected a foreign member of the Royal Swedish Academy of Sciences.

In 1792, Chabert was promoted to Vice-Admiral. Soon after, in the midst of the French Revolution, Chabert fled France, becoming an émigré, and joined the Armée des Princes. He went to London, where Nevil Maskelyne hosted him. Around 1800, his lost his sight. He returned to France in 1802, and was appointed to the Bureau des Longitudes.

He was a Commander in the Order of Saint Louis and in the Order of Saint Lazare.
