= Antoine Cresp =

French Navy officer of the War of American Independence

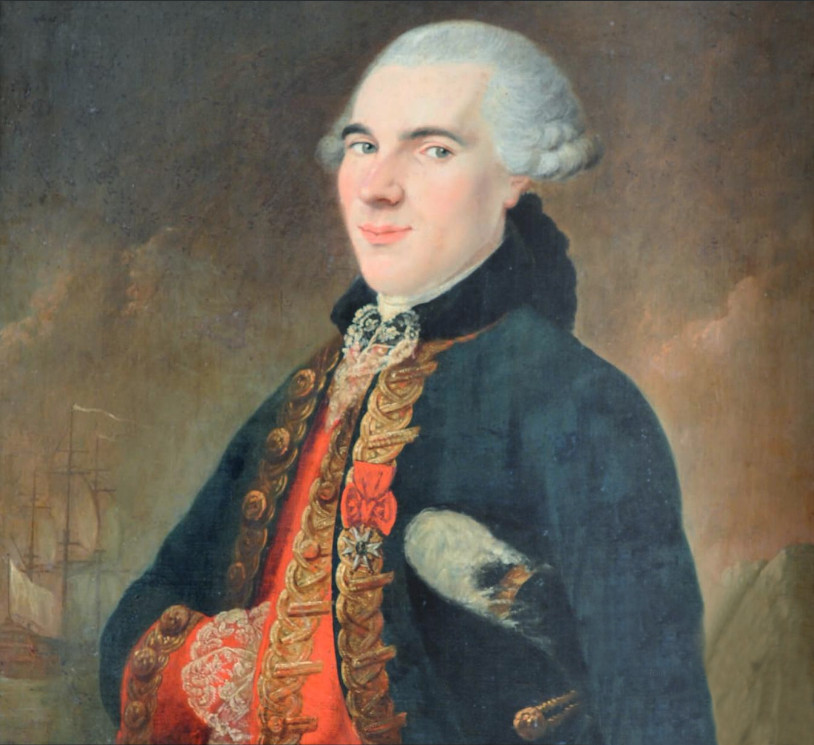
- Born: 19 October 1731 Saint-Cézaire-sur-Siagne, France
- Died: 12 April 1782 (aged 50)
- Branch: French Navy
- Rank: captain
- Conflicts: Battle of the Chesapeake; Battle of the Saintes

Antoine Cresp de Saint-Césaire (Note: Also written "Saint-Cézaire".) (Saint-Cézaire-sur-Siagne, 19 October 1731 — Northumberland, 12 April 1782) was a French Navy officer. He served in the War of American Independence.

== Biography ==
Saint-Césaire was born in Saint-Cézaire-sur-Siagne on 19 October 1731 to Suzanne-Roseline de Grasse and to François Cresp de Saint-Cézaire. He was nephew to De Grasse.

He was promoted to captain, and made a Knight in the Order of Saint Louis. Saint-Césaire was close to Mirabeau, and was best man at his wedding.

He took part in the Battle of the Chesapeake on 5 September 1781 as De Grasse's flag captain on the 110-gun Ville de Paris.

Saint-Césaire captained the 74-gun Northumberland at the Battle of the Saintes on 12 April 1782. He was killed in action.

== Legacy ==
A plaque was unveiled on 3 July 1976 at the city hall of Saint-Cézaire-sur-Siagne by Admiral Frederick C. Turner, Commander of the United States Sixth Fleet, Rear-Admiral Fernand Victor Robin, commander of the Mediterranean squadron of the French Navy, and Marcel Andreis, the Mayor.

== Sources and references ==
Notes

Citations

References

- Antier, Jean-Jacques (1991). L'Amiral de Grasse, héros de l'indépendance américaine. Rennes: Éditions de la Cité, Ouest-France. ISBN 9-782737-308642.
- Lacour-Gayet, Georges (1910). La marine militaire de la France sous le règne de Louis XVI. Paris: Honoré Champion. pp. 431–434.
- Musée de la Marine (2019). Mémorial de Grasse (in French). Grasse: Sud Graphique.
