= Mark Robinson (Royal Navy officer) =

Rear-Admiral Mark Robinson CB
- Born: 22 April 1722
- Died: 23 November 1799 (aged 77); Bath, Somerset
- Military career
- Allegiance: Kingdom of Great Britain
- Branch: Royal Navy
- Service years: 1742–1787
- Rank: Rear-Admiral
- Commands: HMS Falcon; HMS Vanguard; HMS Rainbow; HMS Fowey; HMS Worcester; HMS Shrewsbury
- Conflicts: Seven Years' War; Battle of Minorca; Raid on Rochefort; Raid on St Malo; Invasion of Martinique (1759); Invasion of Martinique (1762); American Revolutionary War; Battle of Ushant; Battle of Fort Royal; Battle of the Chesapeake

Rear-Admiral Mark Robinson (25 April 1722 – 23 November 1799) was an officer of the British Royal Navy, one of several members of the Robinson family to serve at sea.

He entered the Royal Navy in 1742, and was examined for his lieutenancy on 14 May 1747, after having been promoted to the rank of fourth lieutenant of HMS Vigilante on 30 March 1746.

After serving as lieutenant on several ships, Mark Robinson was promoted to captain of the 70-gun third rate HMS Vanguard on 13 August 1760. In the mid-1770s he was captain of the 64-gun, third-rate HMS Worcester.

During the American Revolutionary War he participated in several fleet actions against the French. As captain of Worcester he was at the First Battle of Ushant on 27 July 1778. Worcester was heavily engaged in the rear division under command of Sir Hugh Palliser. Subsequently, he was made captain of HMS Shrewsbury in March 1779.

He distinguished himself at the Battle of the Chesapeake on 5 September 1781. In the course of the engagement, Shrewsbury lost fourteen men killed, and fifty-two wounded, including Robinson, who lost a leg from cannon shot. Unable to return to sea, he was granted a pension. When he became, by seniority, entitled to a flag, he was placed on the list of superannuated rear admirals.

== Robinson and Horatio Nelson ==
Nelson served under Robinson on Worcester as acting fourth lieutenant (8 October 1776 – April 1777). The experience of escorting convoys in the wintery seas to and from Gibraltar completed Nelson's midshipman training. On Worcester's return to England on 3 April, Nelson then completed his lieutenancy examination on 9 April.

Nelson was to subsequently write about this period: "But although my age might have been a sufficient cause for not entrusting me with the charge of a Watch, yet Captain Robinson used to say,'he felt as easy when I was upon deck, as any Officer in the ship".
