= François-Louis du Maitz de Goimpy =

French Navy officer of the War of American Independence

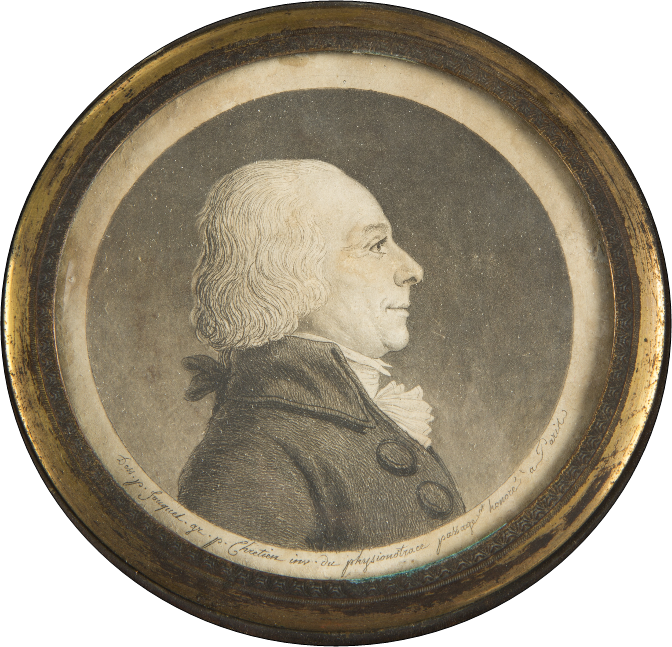
- Born: 10 April 1729
- Died: 29 December 1807 (aged 78)
- Branch: French Navy
- Rank: Chef d'escadre
- Conflicts: Battle of Martinique (1780); Battle of the Chesapeake

François-Louis-Edme-Gabriel, Comte du Maitz de Goimpy Feuquières was a French Navy officer.

== Career ==
Goimpy joined the Navy as a Garde-Marine in 1746. He was promoted to lieutenant in 1757 and to captain in 1772.

He fought in the Battle of Martinique in 1780, and commanded the 74-gun Destin at the 1781 Battle of the Chesapeake. He was also an active lecturer at the Académie de Marine.

In 1782, he was promoted to brigadier, and to chef d'escadre in 1784.

== Citations and references ==
=== References ===
- Contenson, Ludovic (1934). La Société des Cincinnati de France et la guerre d'Amérique (1778-1783). Paris: éditions Auguste Picard. OCLC 7842336.
- Gardiner, Asa Bird (1905). The order of the Cincinnati in France. The Rhode Island state society of Cincinnati. OCLC 5104049.
