= French ship Citoyen (1764) =

Ship of the line of the French Navy

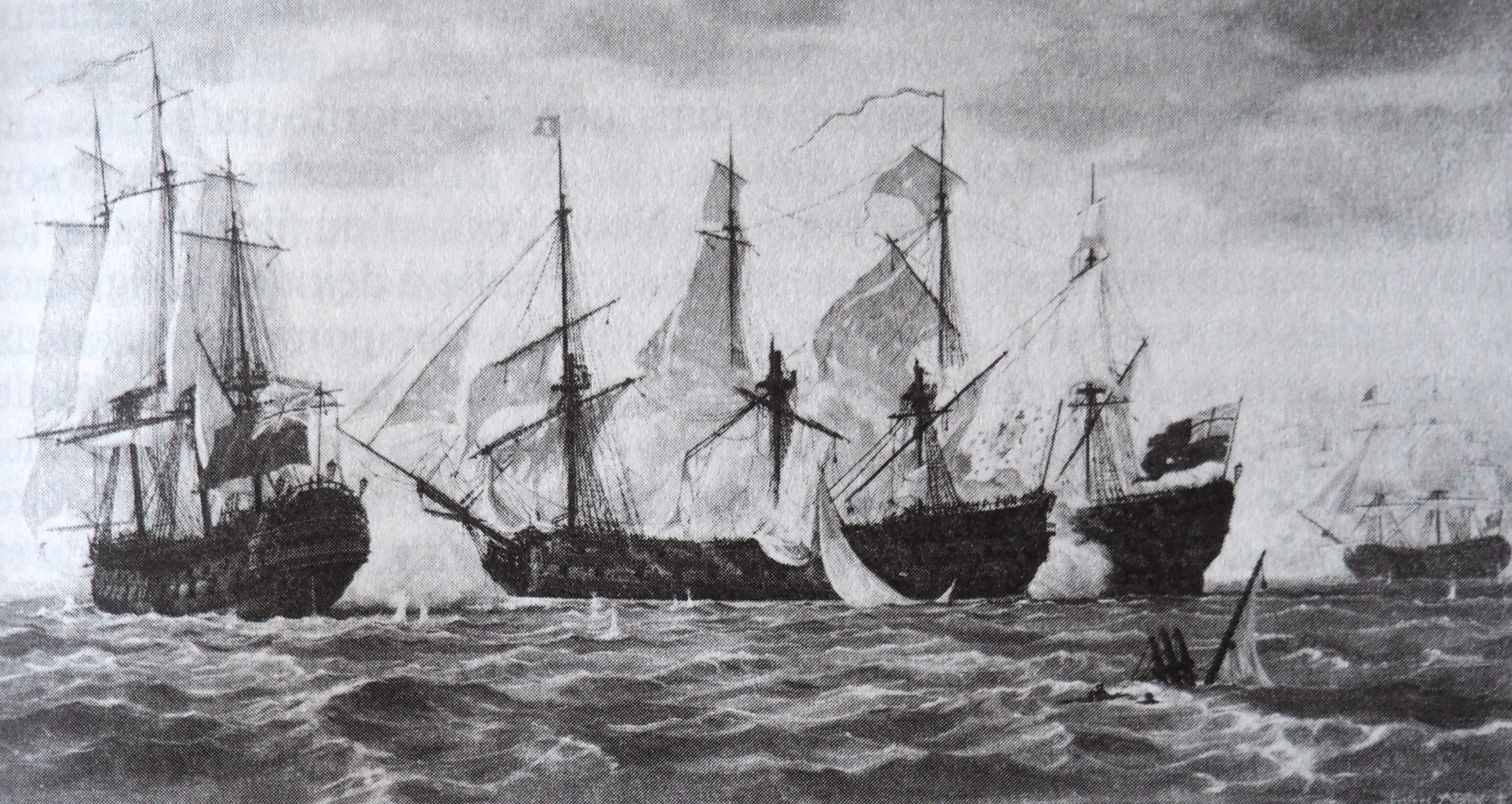
- Conquérant (second from left), Citoyen's sister ship, at the Battle of Cape Henry

History

France
- Name: Citoyen
- Namesake: "Citizen"
- Ordered: May 1757
- Builder: Brest
- Laid down: July 1761
- Launched: 27 August 1764
- In service: December 1764
- Fate: Broken up 1791

General characteristics
- Class & type: Citoyen-class ship of the line
- Displacement: 3000 tonneaux
- Tons burthen: 1500 port tonneaux
- Length: 169½ French feet (Note: Note that the (pre-metric) French foot was 6.575% longer than the equivalent British unit of measurement.) (55.06 metres)
- Beam: 43 French feet (13.97 metres)
- Draught: 21 French feet (6.82 metres)
- Depth of hold: 20¾ French feet (6.74 metres)
- Propulsion: Sail
- Complement: 715 men in wartime, 650 in peacetime, + 6/12 officers
- Armament: 74 guns: Lower battery: 28 × 36-pounders; Upper battery: 30 × 18-pounders; Forecastle and quarterdeck: 16 × 8-pounders

Citoyen (French pronunciation: [sitwajɛ̃]) was a 74-gun ship of the line of the French Navy, lead ship of her class to a design by Joseph-Louis Ollivier. She was funded by a don des vaisseaux donation from the Bankers and General Treasurers of the Army.

== Career ==
Ordered in May 1757 as Cimeterre, the ship was renamed Citoyen on 20 January 1762. A launching attempt aborted on 10 August 1764, when she came to a halt on the ramp, and she was eventually set afloat 17 days later.

She took part in the Battle of Martinique on 17 April 1780 under Captain Poute de Nieuil.

In 1781, under Alexandre de Thy, she was appointed to the squadron of Admiral de Grasse and took part in the Battle of Fort Royal in April. On 24 August, along with Glorieux, she captured HMS Cormorant off Charleston. In September, she took part in the Battle of the Chesapeake on 5 September 1781, in the Battle of St Kitts on 25/26 January 1782 and the Battle of the Saintes on 12 April 1782.

In 1783, on returning to France, she was decommissioned, and was eventually broken up in 1791.
