= John Leigh Douglas =

Royal Navy officer (1741-1810)

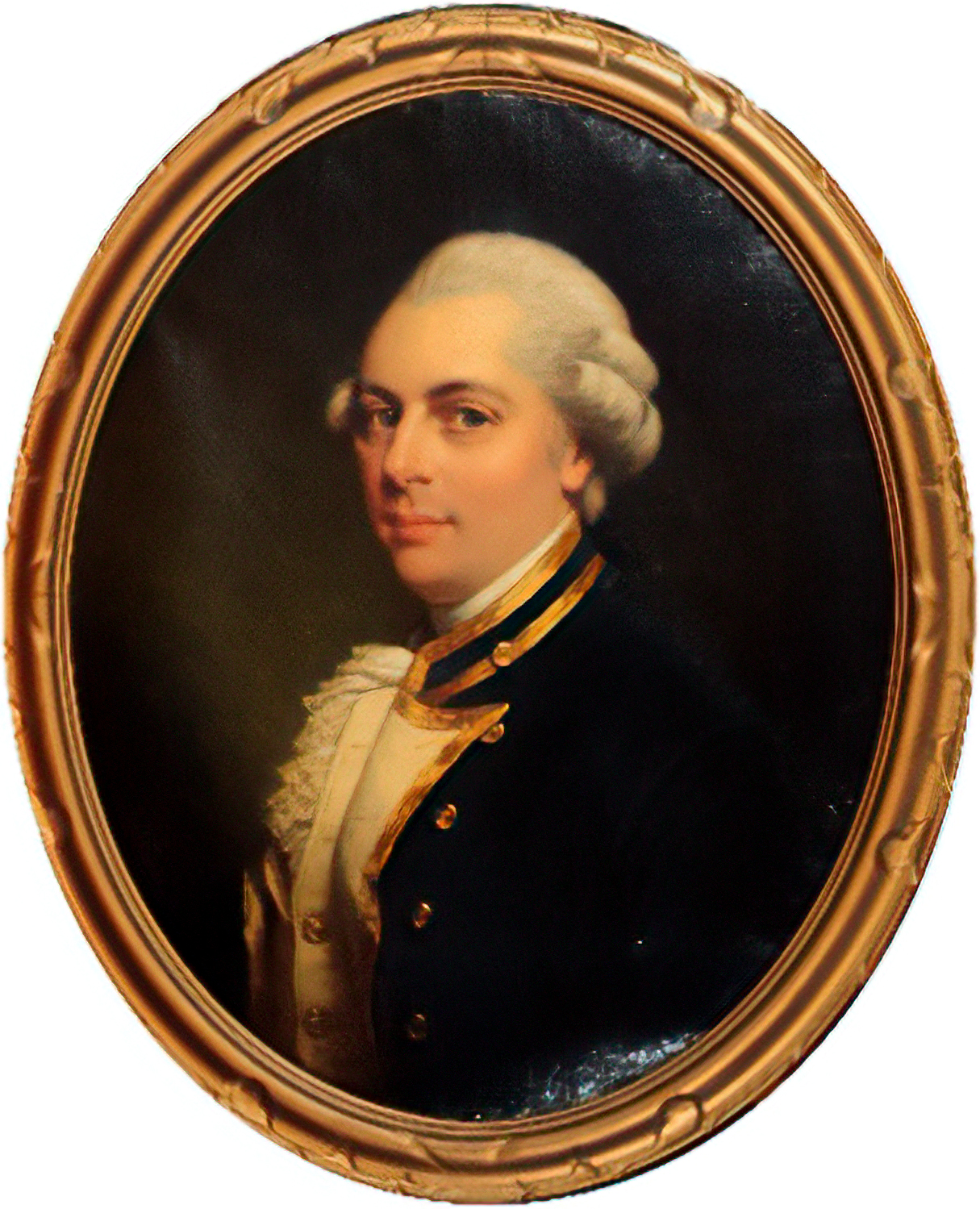
- Portrait of Douglas
- Born: 1741; Midlothian, Scotland
- Died: 27 November 1810
- Allegiance: Great Britain; United Kingdom
- Branch: Royal Navy
- Rank: Admiral
- Commands: HMS Chameleon; HMS Terrible; HMS Venus; HMS Vigilant; HMS Irresistible
- Battles / wars: Moonlight Battle; Battle of Martinique

Admiral John Leigh Douglas (1741 – 27 November 1810) was a Royal Navy officer who served in the American Revolutionary War and French Revolutionary and Napoleonic Wars. His career spanned over three decades, during which he commanded several ships and played a key role in several significant battles.

== Early life and career ==
Born in 1741, Douglas was the son of Reverend Alexander Douglas of Baads, Midlothian, Scotland and Isabel Houston. He began his naval career at a young age, joining the Royal Navy as a Midshipman in 1756. Douglas's early years in the navy were marked by rapid promotion, and he became a Lieutenant on 17 June 1760.

== American Revolutionary War ==
Douglas's first command was the 14 gun HMS Chameleon, which he took charge of in 1777. He sailed to Jamaica in December of that year and played a key role in the naval campaign against the French. Douglas was promoted to Captain 5 April 1779 and took command of HMS Terrible which he led to victory at the Moonlight Battle near Cape St. Vincent 16 January 1780. He led the ship in several battles, including the Battle of Martinique (1780) on 17 April 1780, where he distinguished himself with bravery and tactical skills, receiving praise, amongst five other captains from Admiral Sir George Rodney.

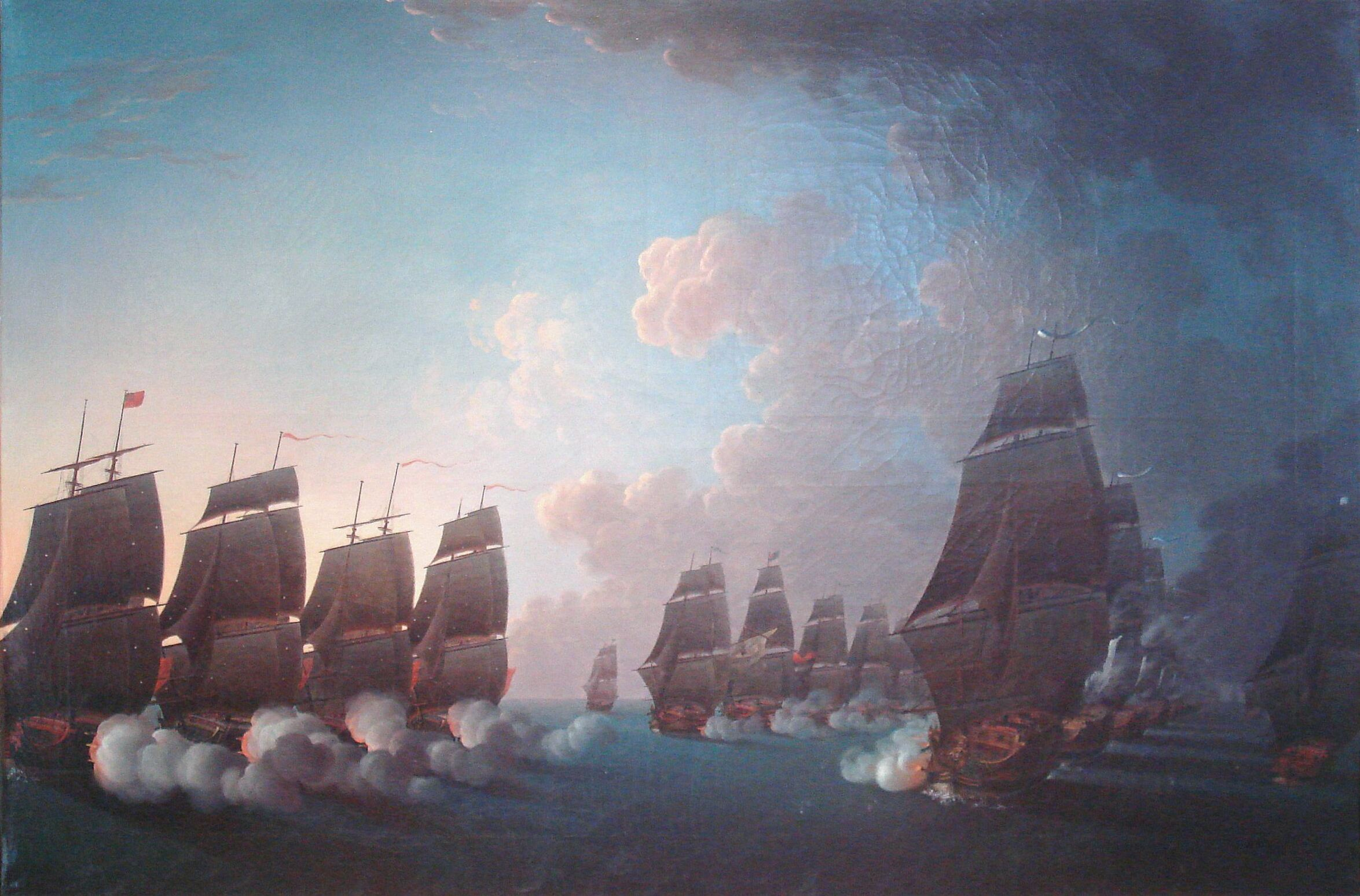
Combat de la Dominique (Battle of Martinique), 17 April 1780, by Auguste Louis de Rossel de Cercy (1736–1804).

== Later career and legacy ==
After the American Revolutionary War, Douglas continued to serve in the Royal Navy, commanding several ships and participating in various naval campaigns. He was promoted to Rear Admiral of the Blue on 1 June 1795, Rear Admiral of the Red in 1799 and Vice Admiral of the Blue on 1 Jan 1801. Douglas's distinguished career was marked by his exceptional leadership skills, bravery, and strategic thinking. He is remembered as one of the most accomplished naval officers of his time.

Douglas's life and career have been the subject of several historical studies and research papers. His contributions to the Royal Navy and his role in shaping British naval history are still celebrated today.

== Personal life ==
Douglas married Charlotte Douglas, daughter of John Douglas, MP for Hindon. The couple had no children, but Douglas's legacy lived on through his notable contributions to the Royal Navy.

== Sources ==
- John Leigh Douglas - more than Nelson
