= Louis-Toussaint Champion de Cicé =

French Navy officer of the War of American Independence

- Born: 5 August 1732; Rennes, France
- Died: 28 January 1792 (aged 59) Paris, France
- Branch: French Navy
- Rank: Chef d'Escadre
- Conflicts: War of American Independence

Louis-Toussaint Champion de Cicé (Rennes, 5 August 1732 – Paris, 28 January 1792) was a French Navy officer. He served in the War of American Independence, earning membership in the Society of the Cincinnati.

== Biography ==
Champion de Cicé was born to an aristocratic family. His parents were Captain of dragoons in the Brittany regiment Jerome-Vincent Champion de Cice (1680–1750) and his wife Marie-Rose De Varennes de Condat (1702–1784). His paternal grandfather was baron François Champion de Cice (1635–1715). He was brother to Jean-Baptiste-Marie Champion de Cicé (1725–1805), Bishop of Troyes and later Bishop of Auxerre, and to Jérôme Champion de Cicé (1735–1810), who served as Minister of Justice and drafted the Declaration of the Rights of Man and of the Citizen and The nun Adelaide-Marie Champion de Cice (1749–1818) was also a relative.

Champion de Cicé joined the Navy as a Garde-Marine on 12 January 1746. He was promoted to Lieutenant on 17 April 1757, and to Captain on 24 March 1772. He married Jeanne-Geneviève-Henriette de Fusée de Voisenon in 1767.

In 1778, he served as first officer on the 74-gun Zodiaque, part of the First Division of the White squadron in the fleet under Orvilliers.

In 1780, he was given command of the 64-gun Solitaire in the squadron under Guichen. He took part in the Battle of Fort Royal on 29 April 1781, and served under De Grasse, taking part in the Battle of the Chesapeake on 5 September 1781, and in the subsequent Siege of Yorktown.

Champion de Cicé was promoted to Brigadier in 1782, and to Chef d'Escadre on 20 August 1784.

== Sources and references ==
Notes

Citations

References

- Contenson, Ludovic (1934). La Société des Cincinnati de France et la guerre d'Amérique (1778-1783). Paris: éditions Auguste Picard. OCLC 7842336.
- Lacour-Gayet, Georges (1910). La marine militaire de la France sous le règne de Louis XVI. Paris: Honoré Champion. pp. 431–434.
- Troude, Onésime-Joachim (1867). Batailles navales de la France (in French). Vol. 2. Challamel ainé. OCLC 836362484.
