= Jean-François d'Arros d'Argelos =

French military officer (1730–1791)

- Born: 26 August 1730; Arthès, France
- Died: 9 September 1791
- Branch: French Navy
- Rank: Chef d'Escadre
- Battles / wars: War of American Independence; Battle of the Chesapeake; Battle of the Saintes

Jean-François d'Arros d'Argelos (Arthès, 26 August 1730 — 9 September 1791) was a French Navy officer. He served in the War of American Independence. D'Arros Island was named in his honour.

== Biography ==
Arros d'Argelos was born to the family of a Navy Captain. He joined the Navy as a Garde-Marine on 20 March 1744. He was promoted to Lieutenant on 15 May 1756.

In 1768, Arros d'Argelos was captain of the fluyt Balance, wrecked near Madeira while returning from Martinique. He then transferred on the corvette Expérience in Rochefort. The year after, he commanded the 14-gun fluyt Nourrice, sailing between Rochefort, the Cape of Good Hope, and the Bay of All Saints in Brazil.

He was promoted to Captain on 18 February 1772. The same year, he was given command of the 64-gun Indien, in the Indian Ocean.

In 1780, Arros d'Argelos commanded the 80-gun Auguste in Brest, as flag captain under Chef d'Escadre Rochechouart.

He commanded the 74-gun Palmier at the Battle of the Chesapeake on 5 September 1781. The next year, he was promoted to Brigadier.

He took part in the Battle of the Saintes on 12 April 1782, captaining the 80-gun Languedoc. During the inquiry that followed the battle, Arros d'Argelos was one of the officers whom De Grasse blamed for the defeat, but he was acquitted of all accusations made against him.

On 20 August 1784, he was promoted to Chef d'Escadre.

Arros d'Argelos was a member of the Académie de Marine.

== Sources and references ==
Citations

References

- Aman, Jacques (1976). Les Officiers bleus dans la marine française au 18e siècle. Librairie Droz. ISBN 9782600033756.
- Contenson, Ludovic (1934). La Société des Cincinnati de France et la guerre d'Amérique (1778-1783). Paris: éditions Auguste Picard. OCLC 7842336.
- Lacour-Gayet, Georges (1910). La marine militaire de la France sous le règne de Louis XVI. Paris: Honoré Champion.
- Troude, Onésime-Joachim (1867). Batailles navales de la France (in French). Vol. 2. Challamel ainé.
- Roche, Jean-Michel (2005). Dictionnaire des bâtiments de la flotte de guerre française de Colbert à nos jours. Vol. 1. Group Retozel-Maury Millau. ISBN 978-2-9525917-0-6. OCLC 165892922.

External links

- Archives nationales (2011). "Fonds Marine, sous-série B/4: Campagnes, 1571-1785" (PDF).
