= Joseph François Auguste Jules d'Albert de Saint-Hippolyte =

French Navy officer of the War of American Independence

Joseph François Auguste Jules d'Albert de Saint-Hippolyte was a French Navy officer. He served in the War of American Independence, earning membership in the Society of the Cincinnati.

== Biography ==
Saint-Hippolyte was born to a family from Provence. He joined the Navy as a Garde-Marine in 1741. He was promoted to Lieutenant in 1756, and to Captain in 1771.

In 1773, he was first officer on the 64-gun Hardi. In 1776, he commanded the 32-gun Sultane at Toulon, part of the Escadre d'évolution under Du Chaffault.

In 1778, Saint-Hippolyte commanded the 74-gun Victoire the squadron under Fabry. The year after, Victoire was attached to the Armada of 1779. He took part in the Battle of Martinique on 17 April 1780. On 1 May 1779, Victoire took part in the capture of HMS Montreal, along with Bourgogne. Saint-Hippolyte captained Victoire at the Battle of the Chesapeake on 5 September 1781.

In November 1781, Saint-Hippolyte commanded a 4-ship division escorting a 120-ship convoy returning to France, also comprising the 80-gun Saint-Esprit, under Chabert-Cogolin.

He was promoted to Chef d'Escadre on 12 January 1782.
