= Jean-Baptiste Turpin du Breuil =

French Navy officer of the War of American Independence

- Born: September 21, 1734; Saint-Martin-lès-Melle
- Died: April 18, 1783 (aged 48); Les Saintes
- Military career
- Allegiance: France
- Branch: Navy
- Rank: Captain
- Commands: Caméléon
- Conflicts: War of American Independence

Complete name : Comte Jean-Baptiste de Turpin de Jouhé du Breuil-Malmaud (SAR Ancestor).

Coat of arms : "three gold besants on azure background".

Jean-Baptiste Turpin du Breuil (Note: Or "de Breuil",) Saint-Martin-de Juillers (into his seigneurial family house "Le Breuil-Malmaud"), 21 September 1734—Les Saintes, 18 April 1783) was a French Navy officer. He served in the War of American Independence.

== Biography ==
Turpin had started sailing at the age of 14 on the FIDELE vessel, commanded by his uncle Admiral Jean-Baptiste Mac Némara, (who had married a young lady Turpin de Jouhé), from a large Irish family.

Turpin joined the Navy as a Garde-Marine on 11 February 1751. In 1753, he commanded the 20-gun xebec Caméléon, sailing from Rochefort to Saint-Domingue and Louisiana. He returned in 1754.

Turpin was promoted to Lieutenant on 1 October 1764. In 1773, he commanded the 12-gun corvette Écureuil, and sailed from Brest to Martinique. He then continued to the Windward Islands.

Turpin married Marie Elisabeth GERMAIN DU PATY at Saint-Pierre, Martinique.

Turpin was promoted to Captain on 4 April 1777. The year after, he captained the 60-gun Fier, part of the First Division of the Blue squadron in the fleet under Orvilliers. He took an incidental part in the Battle of Ushant on 27 July 1778, although Fier was so underpowered compared to the other ships of the line that she remained outside the line of battle, with the frigates.

Turpin captained Fier at the Capture of Grenada on 3 July 1779. On 16 August 1779, Fier was damaged in a gale, losing her mainmast, her mizzen and her fore-topmast, and had to anchor at Martinique to effect repairs.

In 1781, he captained the 74-gun Hercule in the Blue squadron of the fleet under De Grasse. He took part in the Battle of the Chesapeake on 5 September 1781, and in the subsequent Siege of Yorktown.

On 25 August 1782, he commanded the Gardes-Marine in Rochefort, putting him in charge of the training of student officers there.

== Sources and references ==
Notes

Citations

References

- Barrachin, Jean (1900). Histoire de la marine française. Tableau des grandes batailles navales qui se sont livrées depuis le règne de Louis XIV jusqu'à la fin du règne de Charles X, suivi d'une courte biographie des grands amiraux français (in French).
- Lacour-Gayet, Georges (1910). La marine militaire de la France sous le règne de Louis XVI. Paris: Honoré Champion. pp. 431–434.
- Troude, Onésime-Joachim (1867). Batailles navales de la France (in French). Vol. 2. Challamel ainé.

External links

- Archives nationales (2011). "Fonds Marine, sous-série B/4: Campagnes, 1571-1785" (PDF).
