= Jean Antoine Le Bègue de Germiny =

French Navy officer

- Born: 1 December 1727
- Died: 13 May 1808 (aged 80)
- Relatives: Léopold Le Bègue de Germiny
- Military career
- Branch: French Navy
- Rank: Chef d'Escadre
- Conflicts: American Revolutionary War

Jean Antoine Le Bègue de Germiny (1 December 1727 — 13 May 1808) was a French Navy officer who served in the American Revolutionary War.

== Biography ==
Le Bègue was born to Léopold Le Bègue de Germiny, a State council to Leopold, Duke of Lorraine. He later married Marie Josèphe de Parceveaux, daughter of Captain Parceveaux. He joined the French Navy as a Garde-Marine on 1 April 1748.

Le Bègue was promoted to Lieutenant on 1 January 1761. Le Bègue was promoted to Captain on 4 April 1777. In 1779, he proposed plans to raid British factories on the coast of Senegal.

He was given command of the 74-gun Magnanime, which he captained during the Battle of the Chesapeake on 5 September 1781. He took part in the Battle of the Saintes on 12 April 1782, where he was wounded.

Le Bègue was promoted to Brigadier in 1782, and to Chef d'Escadre in 1786.

Le Bègue was a member of the Académie de Marine, and a Knight in the Order of Saint Louis.

== Sources and references ==
Notes

Citations

Bibliography

- Anonymous (1866). Annuaire de la noblesse de France et des maisons souveraines de l'Europe. Paris: Bureau de la publication. p. 246.
- Contenson, Ludovic (1934). La Société des Cincinnati de France et la guerre d'Amérique (1778-1783). Paris: éditions Auguste Picard. OCLC 7842336.
- Lacour-Gayet, Georges (1910). La marine militaire de la France sous le règne de Louis XVI. Paris: Honoré Champion.
- Troude, Onésime-Joachim (1867). Batailles navales de la France (in French). Vol. 2. Challamel ainé.
- Roche, Jean-Michel (2005). Dictionnaire des bâtiments de la flotte de guerre française de Colbert à nos jours. Vol. 1. Group Retozel-Maury Millau. ISBN 978-2-9525917-0-6. OCLC 165892922.
