= Antoine Pierre de Clavel =

French Navy officer of the War of American Independence

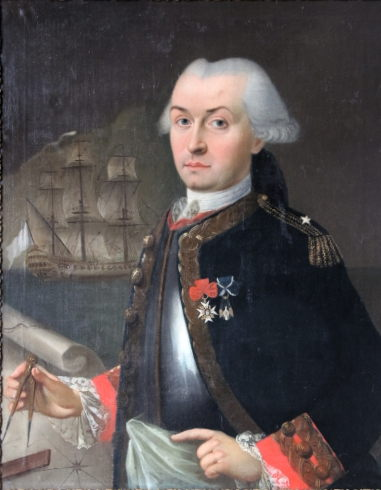
- Born: 1734; Toulouse, France
- Died: 1797
- Service / branch: French Navy
- Rank: captain
- Battles / wars: War of American Independence; Battle of the Chesapeake; Battle of the Saintes

Antoine Pierre de Clavel (1734 in Toulon – 1797) was a French Navy officer. He served in the War of American Independence.

== Biography ==
Clavel was born to the family of a Navy captain. He joined the Navy as a Garde-Marine on 6 July 1750, and had a brother also serving in the Navy.

He was promoted to Lieutenant on 1 May 1763, and to Captain on 4 April 1777.

He commanded Scipion at the Battle of the Chesapeake on 5 September 1781, and at the Battle of the Saintes on 12 April 1782. (Note: Contenson that Clavel retired on 24 November 1781; that seems to be incorrect. He also mixes Claval the Elder (Comte de Clavel) and Clavel the Younger (Chevalier de Clavel). Antoine Pierre de Clavel was the Elder.)

He retired on 21 November 1785.
