= Pierre-Joseph de Castellan =

French Navy officer of the War of American Independence

Pierre-Joseph de Castellan was a French Navy officer. He served in the War of American Independence.

== Biography ==
Castellan joined the Navy on 10 April 1748 as a Garde-Marine. He was promoted to Lieutenant on 15 January 1762, and to Captain on 13 May 1779.

He commanded the 80-gun Auguste at the Battle of the Chesapeake on 5 September 1781, and at the Battle of the Saintes on 12 April 1782, as flag captain to Bougainville.

On 25 March 1785, he retired with the rank of Brigadier.
