= HMS Ajax (1767) =

Ship of the line of the Royal Navy

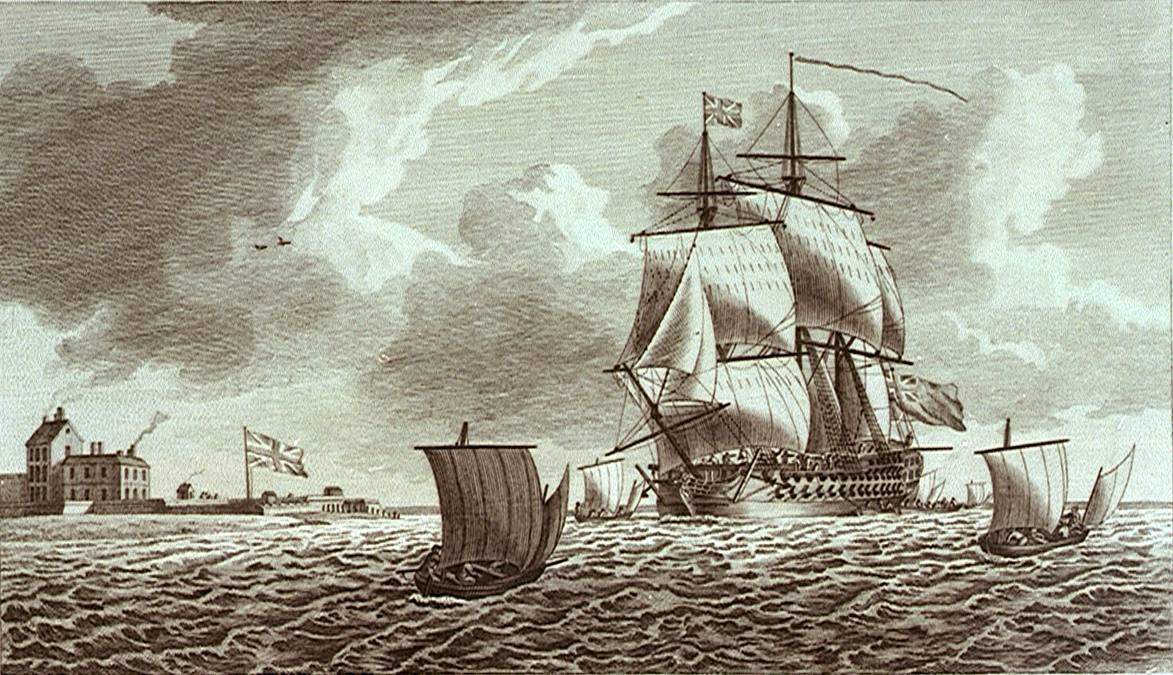
- The Ajax, a Man of War, sailing into Portsmouth Harbour, with a View of Southsea Castle

History

Great Britain
- Name: HMS Ajax
- Ordered: 4 December 1762
- Builder: Portsmouth Dockyard
- Launched: 23 December 1767
- Fate: Sold out of the service, 1785
- Notes: Participated in: Battle of Cape St. Vincent; Battle of the Chesapeake; Battle of St. Kitts; Battle of the Saintes

General characteristics
- Class & type: 74-gun third rate ship of the line
- Tons burthen: 1615
- Length: 167 ft 10 in (51.16 m) (gundeck)
- Beam: 47 ft 5 in (14.45 m)
- Depth of hold: 20 ft 3 in (6.17 m)
- Propulsion: Sails
- Sail plan: Full-rigged ship
- Armament: 74 guns: Gundeck: 28 × 32-pounders; Upper gundeck: 28 × 18-pounders; Quarterdeck: 14 × 9-pounders; Forecastle: 4 × 9-pounders

HMS Ajax was a 74-gun third rate ship of the line of the Royal Navy, built by Thomas Bucknall at Portsmouth Dockyard and launched on 23 December 1767. She was designed by William Bateley, and was the only ship built to her draught. She had a crew of 600 men.

She saw extensive action in the War of American Independence, taking part in the Battles of Cape St. Vincent, the Chesapeake, St. Kitts and the Saintes.

She was driven ashore and damaged at Saint Lucia in the Great Hurricane of 1780 but was recovered.

On 12 April 1782 she saw action against the French fleet at the Battle of the Saintes under command of Captain Nicholas Charrington.

She was sold in 1785.

== Commanders of note ==
- John Carter Allen (later Admiral Allen)
- Philip Boteler
- Robert Linzee (later Admiral Linzee)
- Samuel Uvedale
- John Symons
