= French ship Solitaire =

Ship of the line of the French Navy

History

France
- Name: Solitaire
- Launched: 22 October 1774
- Captured: 6 December 1782, by Royal Navy

Great Britain
- Name: Solitaire
- Acquired: 6 December 1782
- Fate: Sold, 1790

General characteristics
- Class & type: Solitaire class ship of the line
- Displacement: 2250 tonneaux
- Tons burthen: 1090 port tonneaux
- Length: 51 metres
- Beam: 13.2 metres
- Draught: 6.4 metres
- Propulsion: Sails
- Sail plan: Full-rigged ship
- Armament: 26×24-pounder long guns; 28×12-pounder long guns; 10×6-pounder long guns

Solitaire was a 64-gun ship of the line of the French Navy, built by Antoine Groignard and launched in 1774, lead ship of her class. She was captured by the Royal Navy on 6 December 1782, and commissioned as the third rate HMS Solitaire. She was sold out of the Navy in 1790.

== Career ==
In 1776, Solitaire was under Chef d'Escadre Chartres as flagship of one of the three division of the Escadre d'évolution that year. In June, she collided with Terpsichore and both ships had to repair in Cadiz.

In 1778, Solitaire was part of the Third Division of the Blue squadron in the fleet of Orvilliers, and took part in the Battle of Ushant on 27 July 1778 under Captain Briqueville.

In 1779, she was part of a division under Louis Augustin de Monteclerc, also comprising the frigates Inconstante and Surveillante, and led an expedition to hunt down privateers. The division returned to Brest on 4 May 1779 with 400 prisoners. Later that year, Solitaire was attached to a squadron under Orvilliers.

She took part in the Battle of Fort Royal on 29 April 1781 under Cicé-Champion.

Solitaire was part of a squadron that comprised Triton, Résolue, Nymphe, and the brig Speedy. The French squadron sailed on 24 November 1782 from Saint-Pierre, Martinique.

After a dark night, Solitaire, Captain de Borda, found herself in the morning close to a squadron of eight British ships under the command of Rear-Admiral Sir Richard Hughes, which was on its way from Gibraltar. The English gave chase and Solitaire sailed to delay them and give the rest of the French squadron a chance to escape.

At 12:30 and engagement developed between Solitaire and HMS Ruby. As another British vessel approached Solitaire had to strike. Speedy was captured in the same action, after a vigorous defence. In the action, her captain, Ribiers, was killed, together with a large part of her crew. Among the crew members taken prisoners was the young Swedish naval officer Johan Herman Schützercrantz, who would later become a rear admiral in Swedish service.
