= French ship Destin (1777) =

Ship of the line of the French Navy

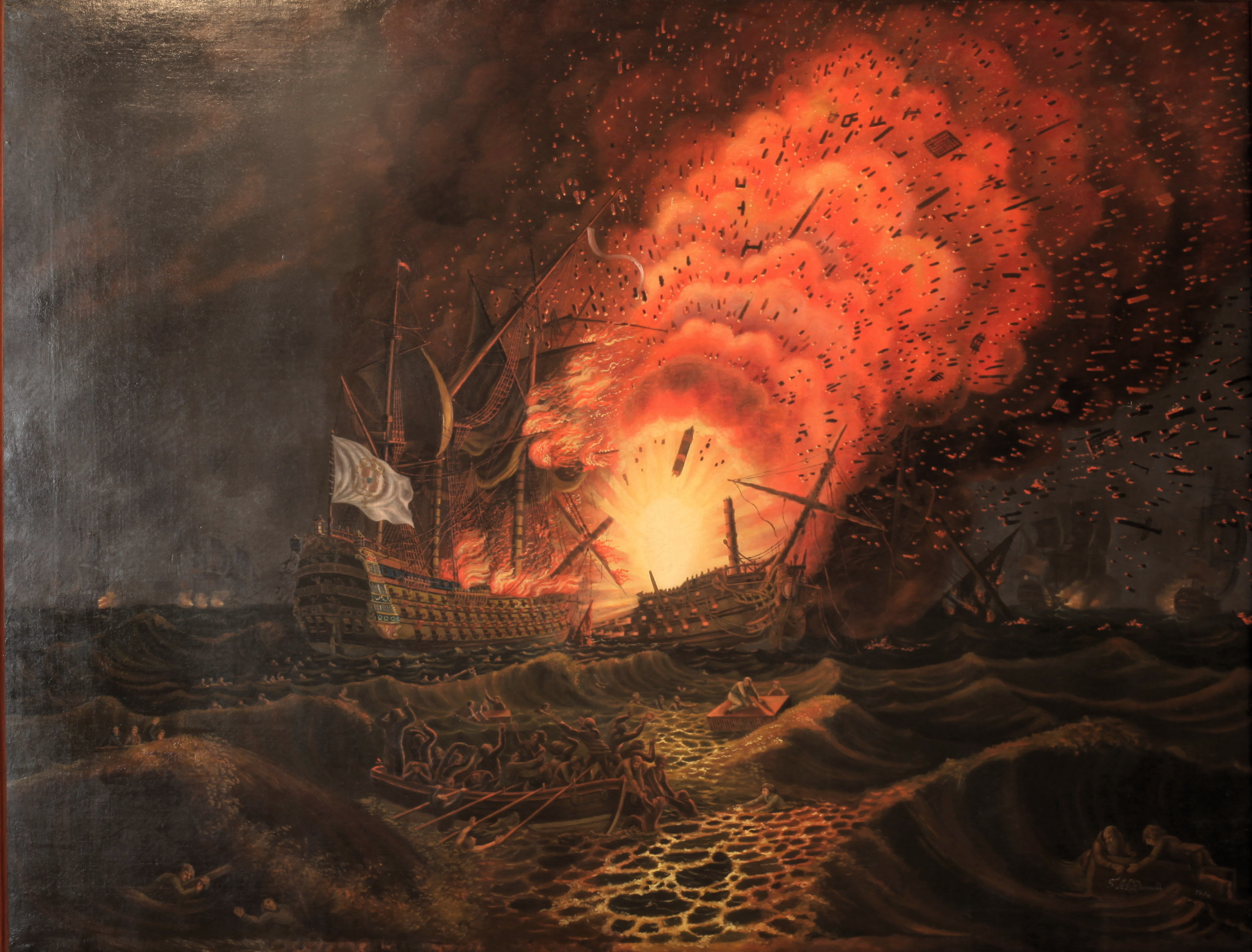
- César (right), Destin's sister ship, blowing up at the Battle of the Saintes

History

France
- Name: Destin
- Namesake: Destiny
- Ordered: 7 February 1770
- Builder: Toulon
- Laid down: April 1770
- Launched: 21 October 1777
- In service: 28 May 1778
- Fate: Scuttled at the end of the Siege of Toulon, wreck raised and broken up in 1807

General characteristics
- Class & type: César-class ship of the line
- Displacement: 2900 tonneaux
- Tons burthen: 1550 port tonneaux
- Length: 54.6 m (179 ft 2 in)
- Beam: 14.1 m (46 ft 3 in)
- Draught: 6.7 m (22 ft 0 in)
- Sail plan: Full-rigged ship
- Armament: 74 guns: 28 × 36-pounder long guns; 30 × 18-pounder long guns; 16 × 8-pounder long guns; 6 × obusiers de vaisseau

Destin was a 74-gun ship of the French Navy.

== Career ==
In 1778, Destin cruised in the Eastern Mediterranean. In 1780, she was appointed to the squadrons bound for America. She took part in the Battle of the Chesapeake on 5 September 1781, and in the Battle of the Saintes on 12 April 1782.

In August 1782, Flotte was given command of Destin, succeeding Goimpy. He sailed to Cádiz to reinforce the fleet under Córdova.

In 1783, she was laid up in ordinary at Toulon. During the Siege of Toulon, she was seized by the Royalist insurgents and surrendered to the British, who scuttled her when they had to evacuate the city in December 1793.

== Fate ==
The sunken Destin was raised in 1807, and the wreck was broken up.
