= French ship Victoire (1770) =

Ship of the line of the French Navy

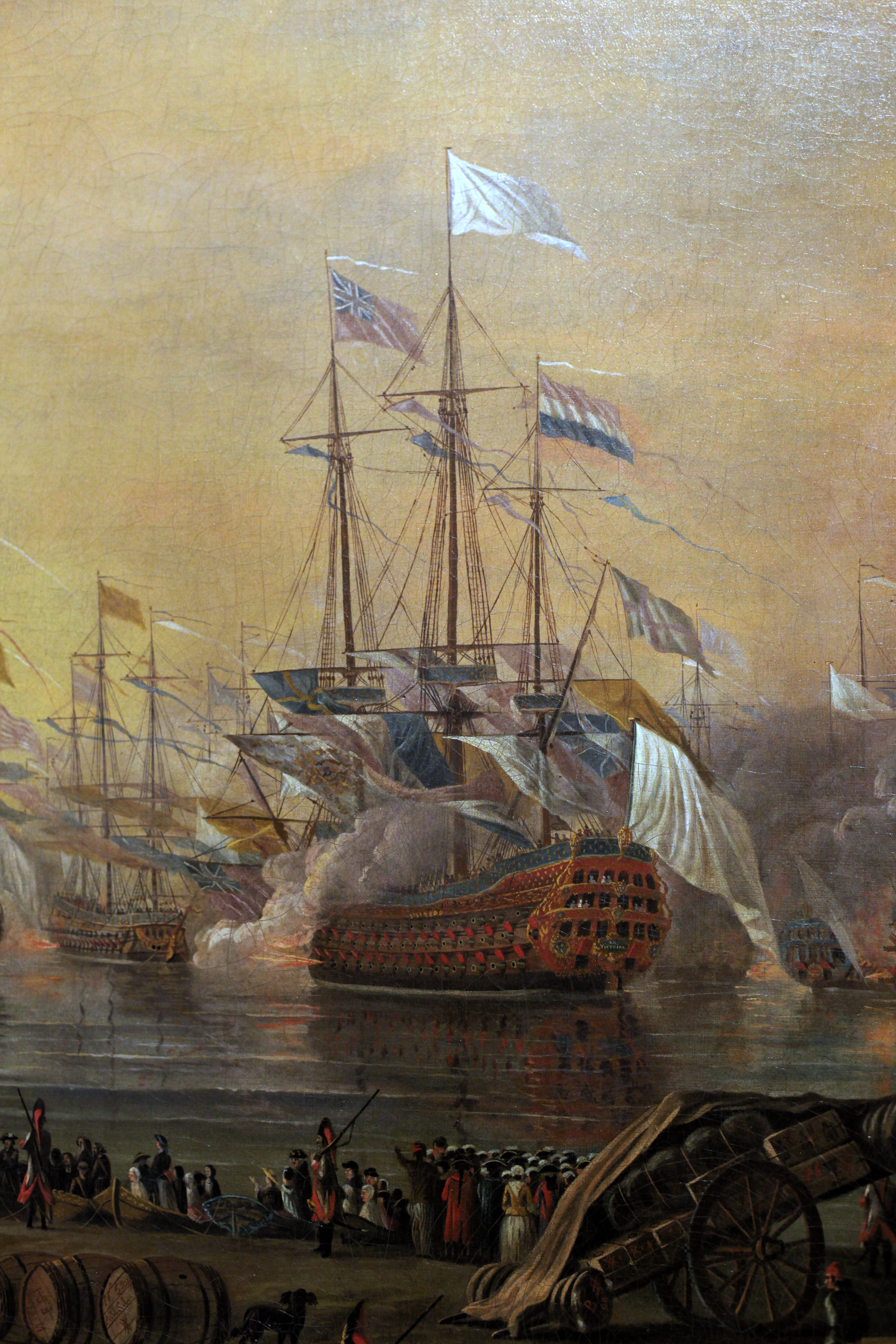
- Victoire represented on a painting of the naval review of 1777 in Toulon. She is incorrectly depicted as a three-decker; Victoire was actually a 74-gun, with two batteries.

History

France
- Name: Victoire
- Namesake: Victory
- Builder: Lorien
- Laid down: August 1768
- Launched: 4 October 1770
- Commissioned: January 1773
- Out of service: July 1792
- Fate: Broken up 1792

General characteristics
- Displacement: 2884 tonneaux
- Tons burthen: 1500 port tonneaux
- Length: 55.2 m (181 ft)
- Beam: 14.1 m (46 ft)
- Draught: 6.9 m (23 ft)
- Armament: 74 guns
- Armour: Timber

Victoire was a Bien-Aimé-class 74-gun ship of the line of the French Navy.

== Career ==
In July 1778, Victore departed Toulon, bound for the Mediterranean, in the context of the American Revolutionary War, under Captain d'Albert Saint Hippolyte. On 12 August, she captured the sloop HMS Industry, and on 28 August, the 10-gun Levant (?).

On 1 May 1779, Victoire took part in the capture of HMS Montreal, along with Bourgogne. The next day she confronted HMS Thetis off Gibraltar. (Note: Roche states that Victoire captured Thetis and brought her to Malaga. Other sources state that Thetis escaped.)

British records largely agree. When Thetis and Montreal saw two large ships approaching under Dutch colours, they suspected that the strange ships were French and attempted to sail away. Thetis succeeded, but at 9p.m., Bourgogne and Victoire caught up with Montreal, came alongside, and ordered Douglas to send over a boat. Captain Douglas sent over Lieutenant John Douglas, whom the French ordered to Douglas to hail Montreal and instruct her to strike. Captain Douglas attempted to escape, but after the French had fired several broadsides into Montreal he struck.

Victoire took part in the Battle of Martinique and the Battle of the Chesapeake.

Victoire was eventually decommissioned in Brest in 1782, and broken up in 1792.
