= Jean-Jacques Antier =

French journalist (1928–2024)

- Born: October 6, 1928; Rouen, France
- Died: January 1, 2023 (aged 94); Tunisia
- Occupation: Journalist
- Known for: Worked for various publications such as Paris Normandie and Cols bleus

Jean-Jacques Louis Antier (6 October 1928 – 1 January 2023) was a French journalist. He worked in for various publications such as Paris Normandie and Cols bleus. Antier authored a number of books on naval and maritime History. He also published a number of biographies, novels and spirituality books under the pseudonym Jean-Jacques. Antier died in Tunisia on 1 January 2023, at the age of 94.

== Works ==
=== Maritime History ===
- L'Amiral de Grasse : Plon, 1965
- Grandes heures de la marine : Waleffe, 1967
- Les Porte-avions et la Maîtrise des mers : Éditions Robert Laffont, 1967
- Histoire mondiale des sous-marins : Éditions Robert Laffont, 1968
- Histoire maritime de la première guerre mondiale : Éditions France-Empire, 1992
- Marins de Provence et du Languedoc : Aubanel, 1977
- Les Sous-mariniers : Grancher, 1977
- Les Sous-mariniers des temps héroïques : Idégraph Genève, 1980
- Les Combattants de la guerre maritime 1914-1918 : Idégraph Genève, 1980
- Au temps des voiliers long-courriers : France-Empire, 1979
- Au temps des premiers paquebots à vapeur : France-Empire, 1982
- Histoire de l'aviation navale : Presses de la Cité, 1983
- L'Aventure héroïque des sous-marins français : Éditions maritimes et d’outre mer, 1984
- Le Porte-avions Clemenceau : Ouest-France, 1984
- Les Convois de Mourmansk; Presses de la Cité, 1981
- La Bataille de Malte : Presses de la Cité, 1982
- La Bataille des Philippines : Presses de la Cité, 1985
- L'aventure kamikaze : Presses de la Cité, 1986
- Pearl Harbor : Presses de la Cité, 1988
- Le Drame de Mers el-Kébir : Presses de la Cité, 1990
- La Flotte se saborde : Presses de la Cité, 1992

=== Spirituality ===
- Lérins, l'île sainte de la Côte d'Azur : Ed. SOS 1973 et 1988
- Carrel cet inconnu : Wesmael 1970
- Le Pèlerinage retrouvé : Éditions du Centurion 1979
- La Soif de Dieu : Éditions du Cerf 1981
- L'Appel de Dieu : Cerf 1982
- Les Pouvoirs mystérieux de la foi : Éditions Perrin 1992 (avec Jean Guitton)
- Le Livre de la sagesse : Perrin 1998 (avec Jean Guitton)
- Enquête sur le mysticisme féminin : Perrin 2000

=== Biographies ===
- Marthe Robin, le voyage immobile : France Loisirs 1992
- Alexis Carrel, la tentation de l'absolu : Éditions du Rocher 1994
- Charles de Foucauld : Perrin 1997
- La Vie de Jean Guitton : Perrin 1999
- La Vie du curé d'Ars : Perrin 2000
- C.G. Jung : Presses de la Renaissance 2010
- Pierre Teilhard de Chardin ou la force de l'amour : Presses de la Renaissance 2011

=== Regional history ===
- Le Comté de Nice : France-Empire 1972 et 1992
- La Côte d'Azur, ombres et lumières : France-Empire 1972
- Les Îles de Lérins : Solar 1974 et 1979
- Grandes heures des îles de Lérins : Perrin 1975
- Histoires d'amour de la Côte d'Azur : Presses de la Cité 1976

=== Novels ===
- Opération avion sous-marin, Laffont, 1968
- La Meute silencieuse, Laffont, 1969
- Les Prisonniers de l'horizon, France-Empire, 1971
- Les Évadés de l'horizon, Hachette (Bibliothèque verte), 1973
- Les Seigneurs de la mer, France-Empire, 1976 (réédité en Bibliothèque verte sous le titre La Plus Belle Course transatlantique)
- La Croisade des innocents, Presses de la Cité, 1996
- Autant en apporte la mer, Presses de la Cité, 1993
- Le Rendez-vous de Marie-Galante, Presses de la Cité, 2000
- Marie Galante, la liberté ou la mort, Presses de la Cité, 2002
- Le Sixième Condamné de l'Espérance, Presses de la Cité, 2004
- La Dame du grand mat, Presses de la cité, 2004
- Tempête sur Armen, Presses de la cité, 2007 - Prix Corail du livre de mer 2008
- La Fille du carillonneur, Presses de la Cité, Paris, 2009 ISBN 9782258075696
- La Prisonnière des mers du Sud : Presses de la Cité 2009
- Blanche du Lac, Calmann-Lévy, 2010
- Le Convoi de l'espoir, Calmann-Lévy, 2013
- La Fiancée du Kamikaze, Calmann-Lévy, 2014
