= Brigadier des armées navales =

Brigadier des armées navales was a rank in the French Navy during the ancien Régime. The rank was created by an edict on 25 March 1765 and renamed chef de division on 1 January 1786. It was senior to ship-of-the-line captain, and junior to chef d'escadre.

== History ==
The rank of brigadier des armées navales was created by an edict on 25 March 1765, and automatically bestowed upon the 50 most senior ship-of-the-line captains in the French Navy. It was the most senior rank in the Navy below flag officers and was at a similar position to brigadiers in the French Royal Army. On 1 January 1786, Secretary of State of the Navy Charles Eugène Gabriel de La Croix renamed the rank to chef de division and limited the maximum number of officers who could hold the rank to 27.

== Sources and references ==
Notes

Citations

References

- Vergé-Franceschi, Michel (2002). Dictionnaire d'Histoire maritime. Paris: Robert Laffont. ISBN 2-221-08751-8.
