= Kullarmark =

Coordinates: 62°41′N 17°44′E

Kullarmark is a small village in Härnösand Municipality, Västernorrland County, Sweden. There are currently 6 people living there in 6 different houses. It is an old village, and was first mentioned in 1535.
