= French ship Couronne (1768) =

Ship of the line of the French Navy

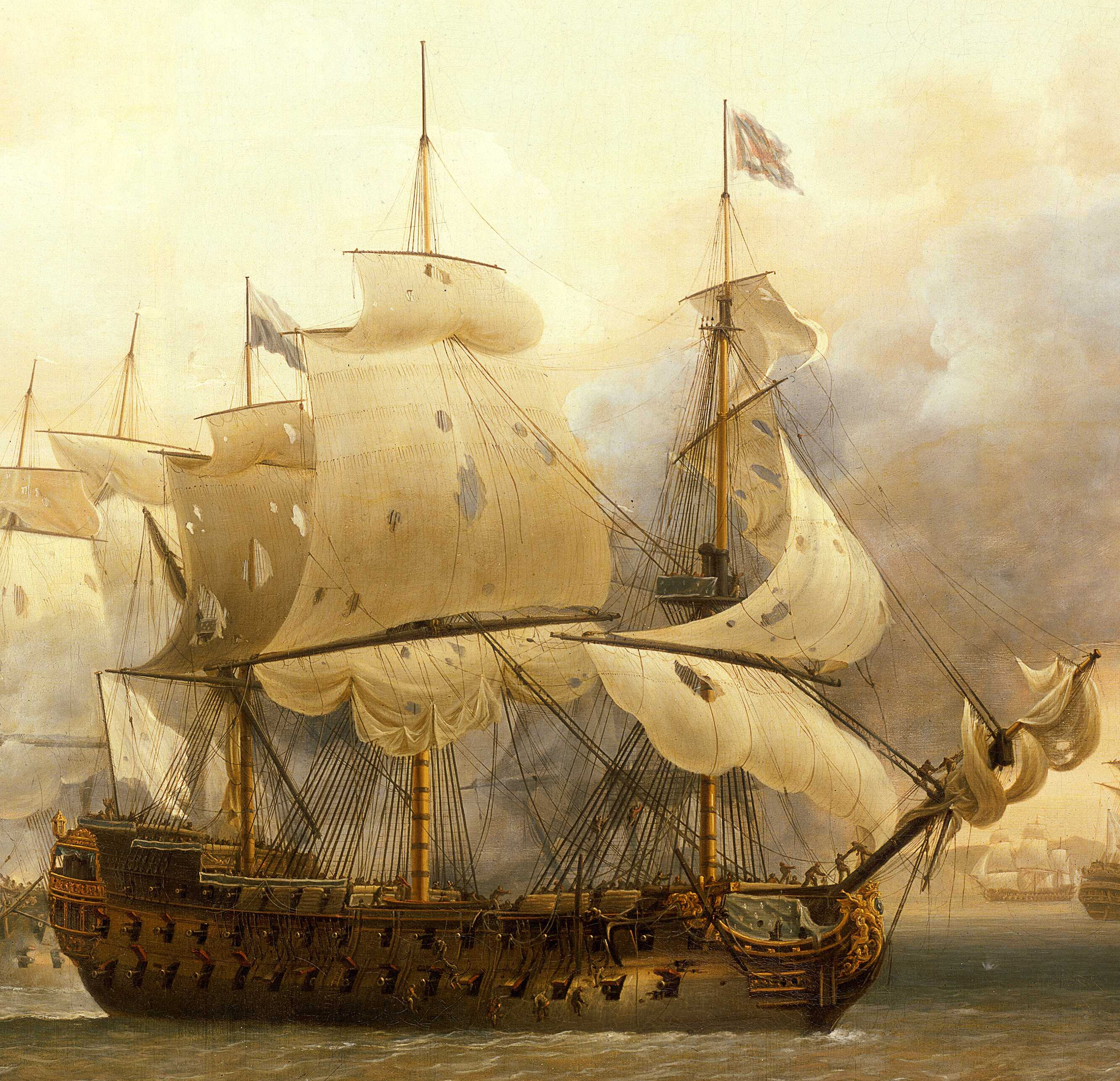
- Couronne's sister ship Saint-Esprit at the Battle of Saint Kitts on 26 January 1782

History

France
- Name: Couronne
- Builder: Arsenal of Brest
- Laid down: August 1766
- Launched: May 1768
- Fate: Accidentally burnt in April 1781

General characteristics
- Class & type: Saint-Esprit-class ship of the line
- Displacement: 3770 tonneaux
- Tons burthen: 1745 port tonneaux
- Length: 59.8 m (196 ft 2 in)
- Beam: 14.9 m (48 ft 11 in)
- Draught: 7.5 m (24 ft 7 in)
- Complement: 970
- Armament: 80 guns: 30 × 36-pounder long guns; 32 × 24-pounder long guns; 18 × 18-pounder long guns

Couronne was an 80-gun Saint-Esprit-class ship of the line of the French Navy.

She was laid down at Brest in August 1766 and launched in May 1768. She took part in the Battle of Ushant in 1778 and the Battle of Martinique under Guichen in July 1780. She was burnt by accident at Brest in April 1781, with some of her salvaged hull probably being used in her successor, also named Couronne.
