= Västanåfallet =

Waterfall in Sweden

Coordinates: 62°44′5″N 17°24′55″E

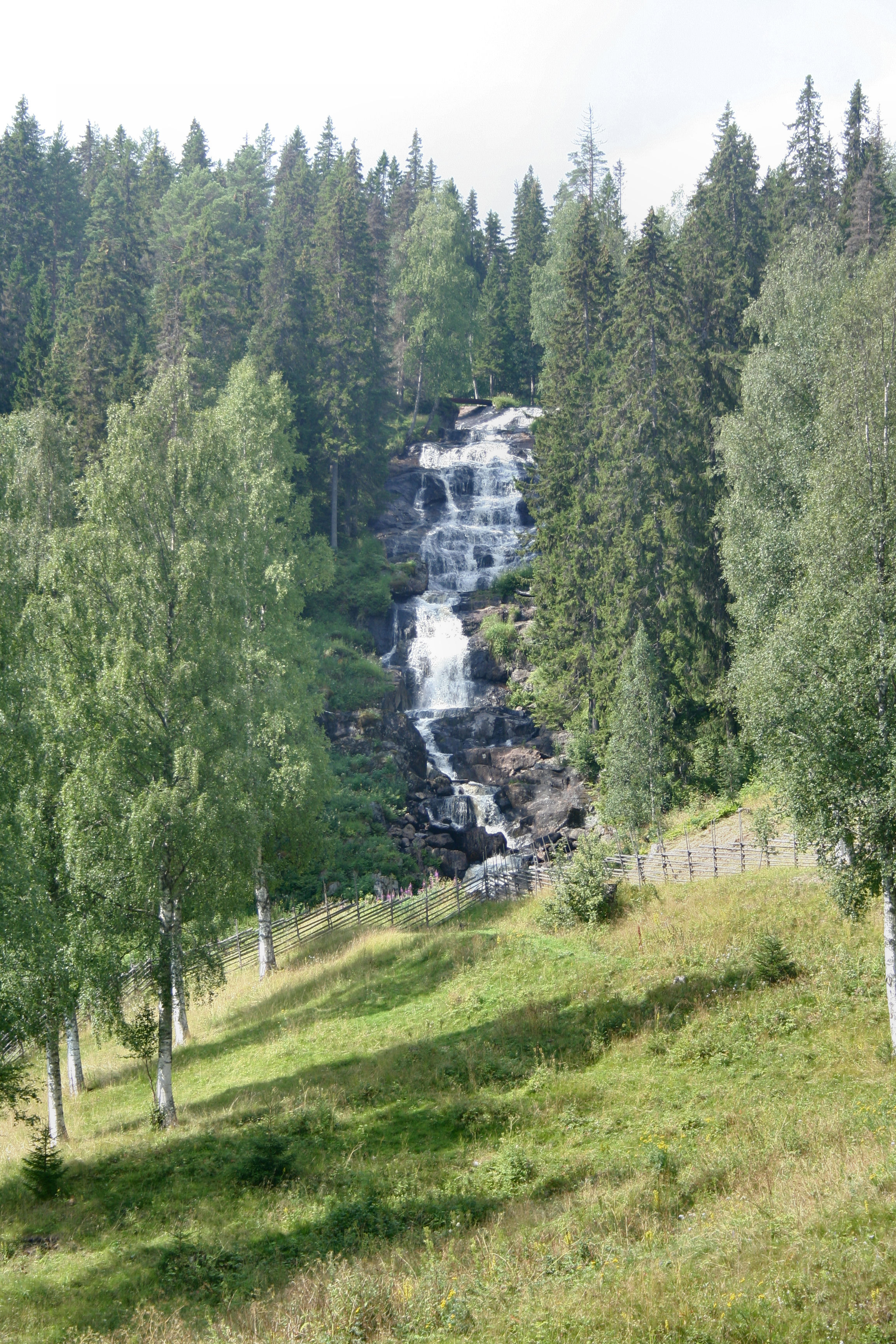
Västanåfallet

Västanåfallet is a cascade waterfall located in Härnösand Municipality, in Västernorrland County, Sweden.

The falls are located about three kilometers south of the village of Viksjö, on the Eksjöåns River, and have a height of 90 meters. The river then joins the Mjällån river, and the falls highest flows are in spring and early summer.

The Västanå ironworks opened near the falls in 1744, and operated through 1867, and some remnants of those operations remain on site, including an old smithy building dating from the 1700s.

The falls are in a 17-acre nature reserve established in 1978, accessed from county road (Länsväg) 331. The nature reserve contains an old lodge with exhibits about the history of the site and area, and also hosts popular local events. The reserve also offers Icelandic horse rides.

== See also ==
- List of waterfalls
