= Hälledal =

- Location within Västernorrland Location within Sweden
- Coordinates: 62°48′22″N 17°51′59″E
- Country: Sweden
- Province: Ångermanland
- County: Västernorrland County
- Municipality: Härnösand Municipality

Area
  - Total: 71 ha (180 acres)

Population (31 December 2020)
  - Total: 415
- Time zone: UTC+1 (CET)
  - Summer (DST): UTC+2 (CEST)

Hälledal is a locality situated in Härnösand Municipality, Västernorrland County, Sweden, south of Ramvik.

The buildings in Hälledal were counted until 2015 as part of the conurbation of Ramvik. In 2015, the agglomeration was divided where the northern part around the town of Ramvik was classified as a small town and this the southern part was classified as a separate settlement that was counted as an agglomeration, which took over Ramvik's agglomeration code.
