= Anton Ulrik Berndes =

Swedish artist and land surveyor

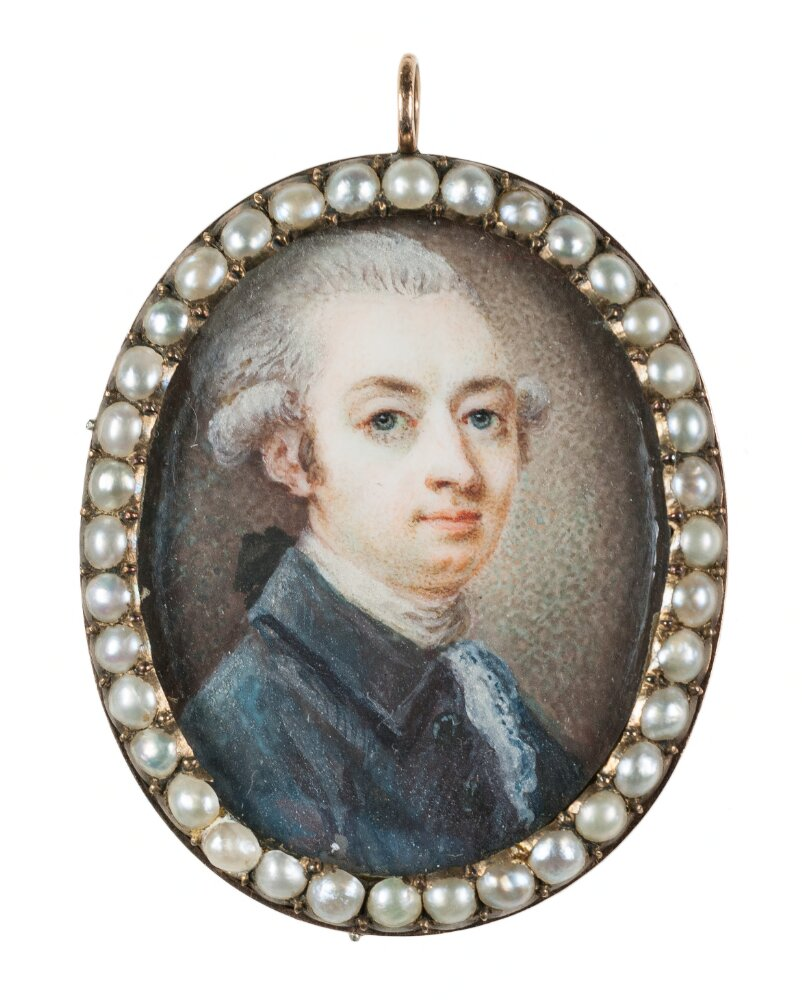
Anton Ulrik Berndes, self-portrait

Anton Ulrik Berndes (15 June 1757 – 11 April 1844) was a Swedish artist and land surveyor. He specialised in producing portrait miniatures, but was also active as a graphic artist using other techniques, and is credited with introducing the mezzotint to Sweden.

== Family and background ==
Anton Ulrik Berndes was born in the parish of Alunda in Uppland. His father was foreman at a mine. His brother Pehr Bernhard Berndes was a naval officer and chemist. Anton Ulrik Berndes married Anna Elisabet Unfraun in 1766; after her death in 1807 he married Katarina Charlotta Thraene in 1811. His son was also an artist. The Berndes family had emigrated to Sweden from Switzerland in the early 18th century.

Anton Ulrik Berndes was educated as a land surveyor, and was employed by Lantmäteriet, the Swedish Mapping, Cadastral and Land Registration Authority, from 1775. He had a successful career; the last position he held before his retirement was First Land Surveyor in Stockholm County. He died in Stockholm.

== Art ==
Berndes was taught drawing by his father, and was probably also taught by Gustaf Lundberg and the Danish artist Cornelius Høyer. In 1794 he spent one year in Britain, where he learned printmaking by mezzotint, a technique which he introduced to Sweden. He was widely employed as a painter of portrait miniatures. In this capacity he played an important role in Swedish artistic life at the end of the 18th century and beginning of the 19th. He produced around 600 portrait miniatures during his life. His services were widely sought after; Berndes received commissions from members of the lower bourgeoisie as well as from the royal court.

Stylistically, during a first period from the mid-1780s to 1794, he worked largely in the style of Peter Adolf Hall, employing "a certain rosy freshness". Following the return to Sweden of Niclas Lafrensen in 1791 and the appearance of Lorentz Svensson Sparrgren, Berndes was to some extent outcompeted and had to change his style. Following his return from Britain, Berndes adapted stylistically to new ideals, using less vivid colours and in general producing somewhat stricter portraits in the Empire style.

He became a member of the Royal Swedish Academy of Fine Arts in 1803.

== Gallery ==
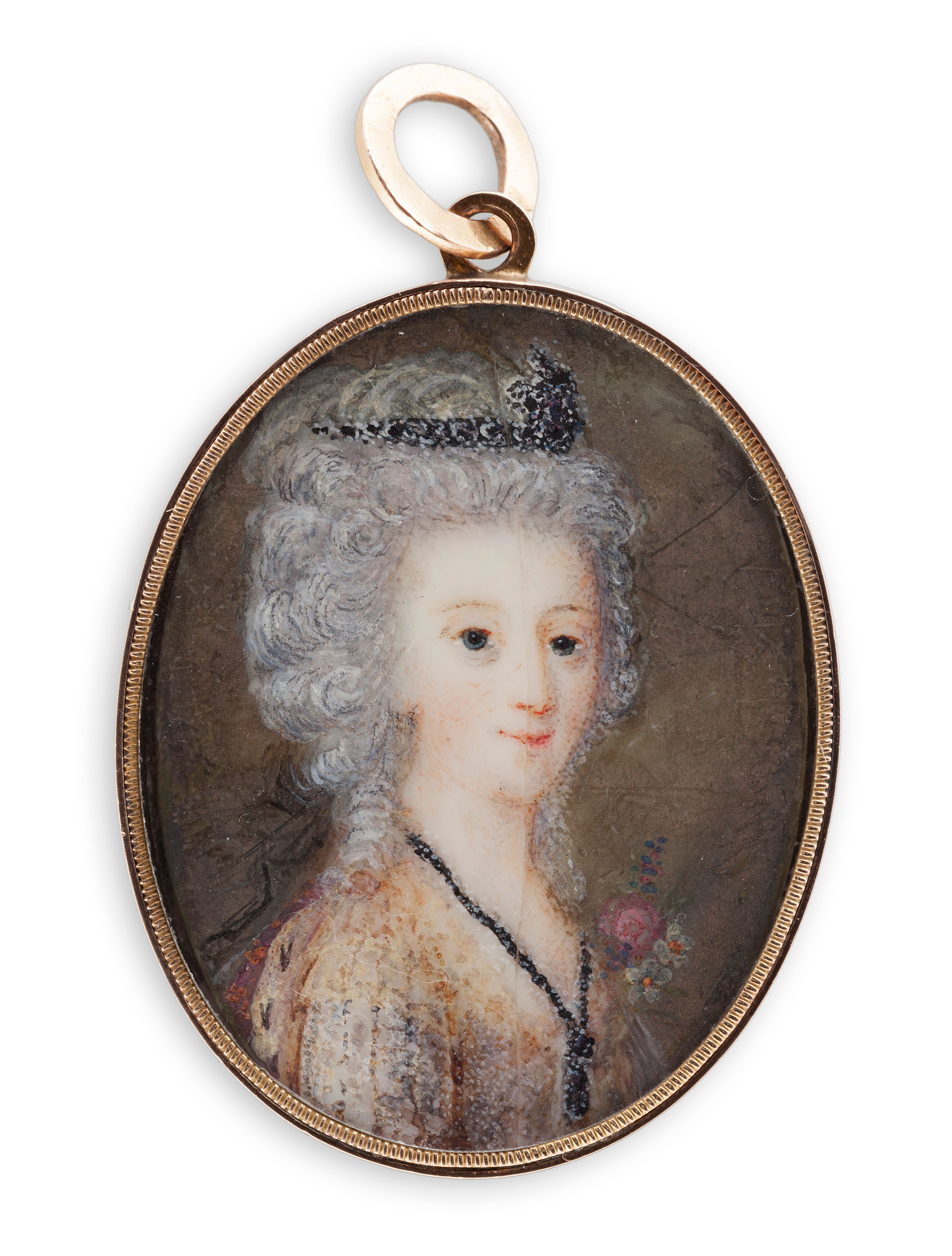
Queen Sophia Magdalena (Finnish National Gallery)

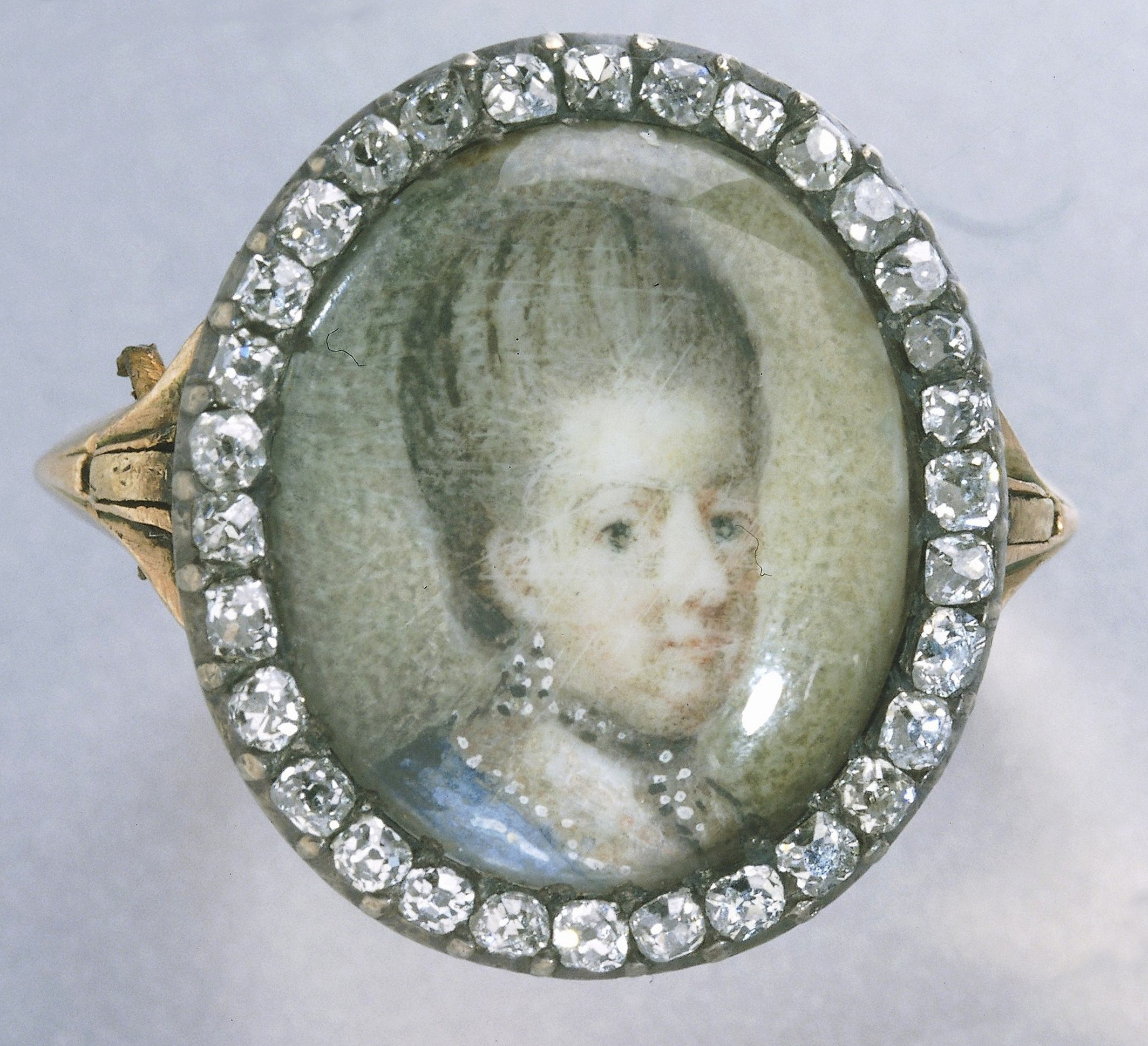
Queen Louisa Ulrika, ring with portrait miniature (c. 1770, Livrustkammaren)

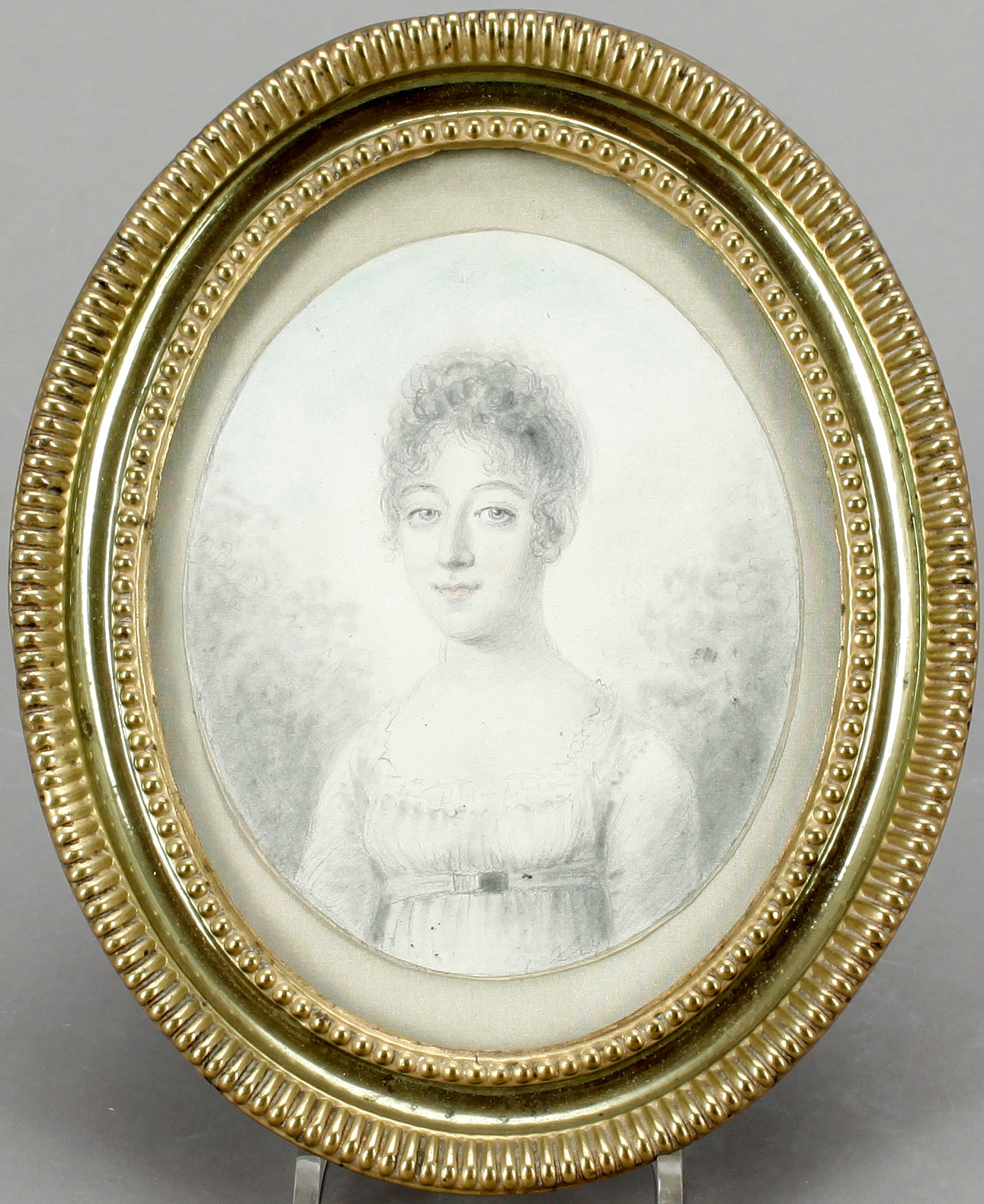
Virginia Gylleborg (1799)

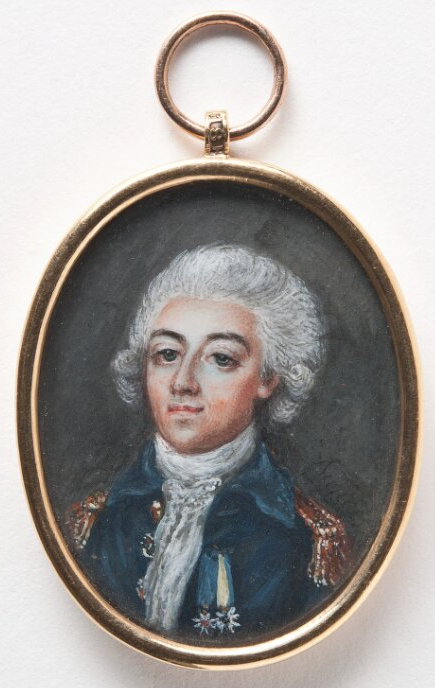
Johan Herman Schützercrantz (Nationalmuseum)

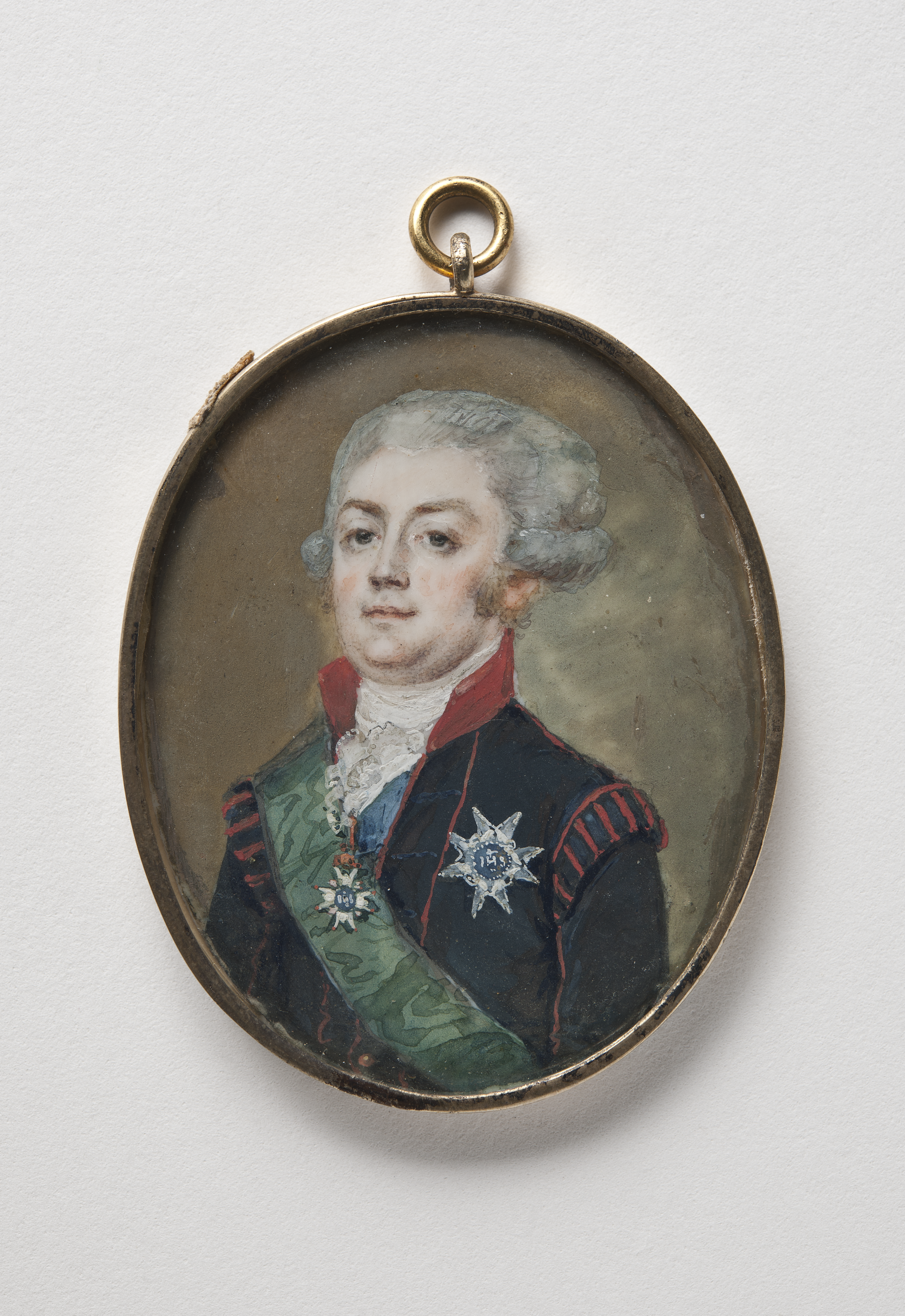
Adolf Fredrik Munck (Nationalmuseum)

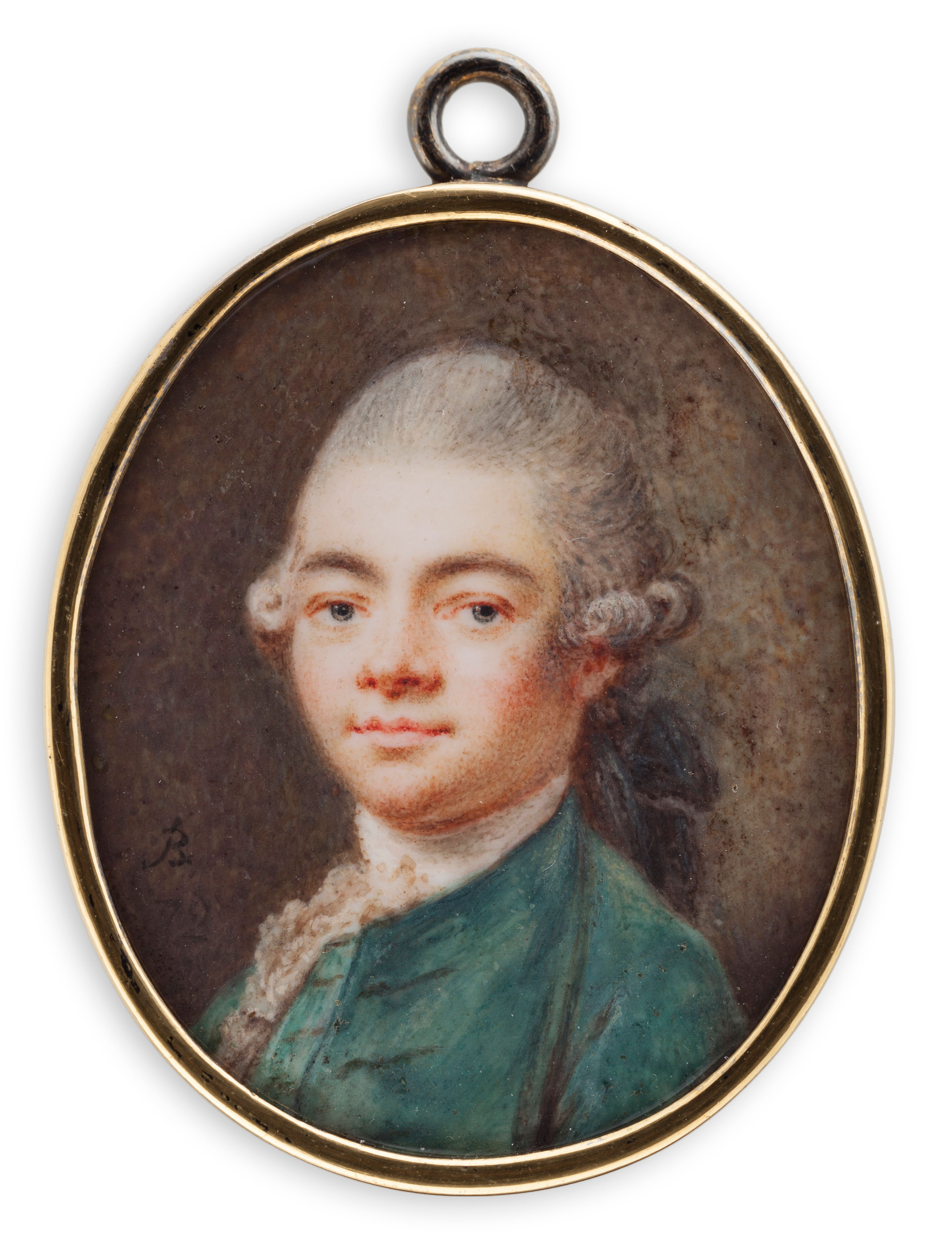
Fredrik Akrel (Finnish National Gallery)

== Sources cited ==
- Bohman, Nils; Dahl, Torsten, eds. (1946). Svenska män och kvinnor: biografisk uppslagsbok [Swedish men and women. Biographical dictionary] (in Swedish). Vol. 1. A-B. Stockholm: Bonnier. OCLC 4629338. SELIBR 53802.
- Carlander, Carl Magnus (1897). Miniatyrmålare i Sverige [Portrait miniature painters in Sweden] (in Swedish). Stockholm: C. & E. Gernandt. OCLC 1001317473.
- Hofberg, Herman; Heurlin, Frithiof; Millqvist, Viktor; Rubenson, Olof, eds. (1906). Svenskt biografiskt handlexikon [Swedish biographical handbook] (in Swedish). Vol. 1. Stockholm: Bonniers. OCLC 474064019.
- Asplund, K (1924). "Anton Ulric Berndes". Svenskt biografiskt lexikon (in Swedish). Vol. 4. National Archives of Sweden.
