= Anders Åkerman =

Swedish globe maker (1721 or 1723 – 1778)

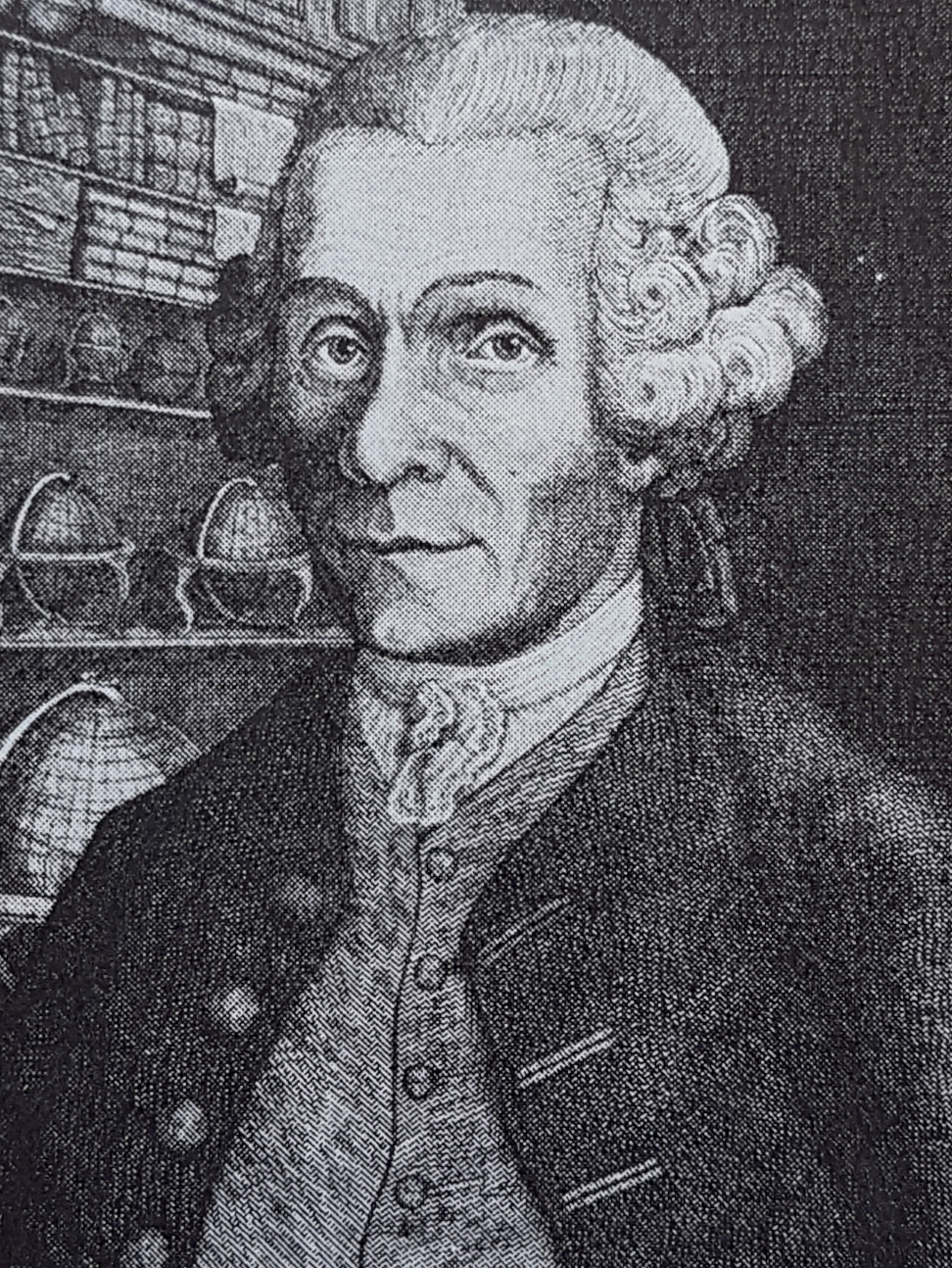
Anders Åkerman, self-portrait

Anders Åkerman (1721 or 1723 – 1778) was a Swedish globe maker. He was the son of a carpenter and his mother worked as a servant at a manor house. He studied mathematics in Uppsala University and learnt engraving. In 1758 he was engaged by a newly formed cosmographic society to produce terrestrial and celestial globes, with the purpose of propagating geographic knowledge and offering a cheaper alternative to imported globes. He produced a first model pair, consisting of a terrestrial globe and a celestial globe, in 1759–60.

A smaller, second model pair was produced from 1762, and a third model pair, larger than the earlier two pairs, in 1766. Despite continuous support from several benefactors, the production never became commercially viable and suffered further setback following a fire which devastated Åkerman's workshop in 1766. He died destitute, though the workshop would continue to exist in changing forms for around a century. Åkerman was the first one to produce terrestrial and celestial globes in Sweden.

== Biography ==
Åkerman appears to have been born in 1721 (or possibly 1723) in the countryside of present-day Nyköping Municipality. He came from a poor family; his father was a carpenter. His surname possibly derived from the nearby estate Åkerö Manor, where his mother worked as a servant. He married Kristina Österberg in 1753; the couple had a daughter, and a son who also became an engraver.

He attended school in Strängnäs 1739–1747, and then enrolled in Uppsala University. He studied mathematics, but apparently he never graduated. In the meantime, he had started learning engraving in 1750, perhaps from Carl Bergqvist. From then on he produced mainly copper engravings for printing various ephemera for the university. He would continue producing engravings throughout his life. He made some portraits, including one of Carl Linnaeus.

He also printed a hydrographic map of the Gulf of Finland and an atlas for children in 1768; the latter became a success and new editions appeared in 1774, as well as after Åkerman's death, in 1807, 1810, 1813, and 1815. From 1757 he was employed by the Royal Society of Sciences in Uppsala as their engraver, and from 1758 active as a globe maker. Åkerman started the first production of terrestrial and celestial globes in Sweden, and has therefore been given the epithet the "father of Swedish globemaking".

Despite receiving substantial aid from several benefactors, Åkerman struggled economically throughout his life. In April 1766, a fire devastated much of the city of Uppsala, and destroyed the workshop of Åkerman. He managed to salvage some material and could relatively quickly resume his work, but appears to have been psychologically broken after the event. He died destitute in Uppsala.

Though never commercially viable, the globe workshop he had founded in Uppsala was contextually part of a scientifically very productive time in Sweden, during the second half of the 18th century. The workshop would continue to exist in somewhat changing forms for around a century. Fredrik Akrel, who had studied under Åkerman, was appointed as his successor by the Royal Swedish Academy of Sciences in 1788.

== Globe production ==
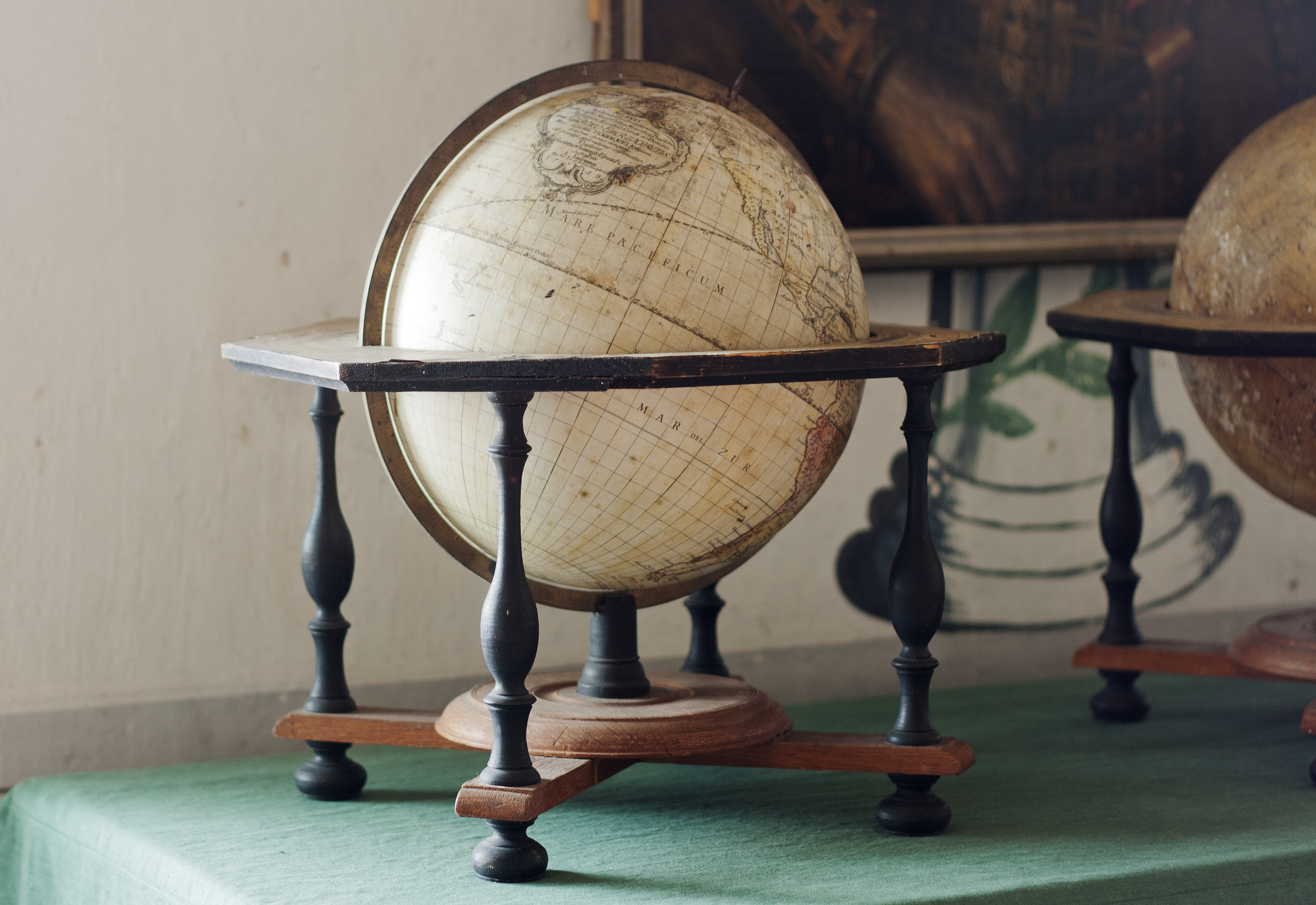
Terrestrial globe

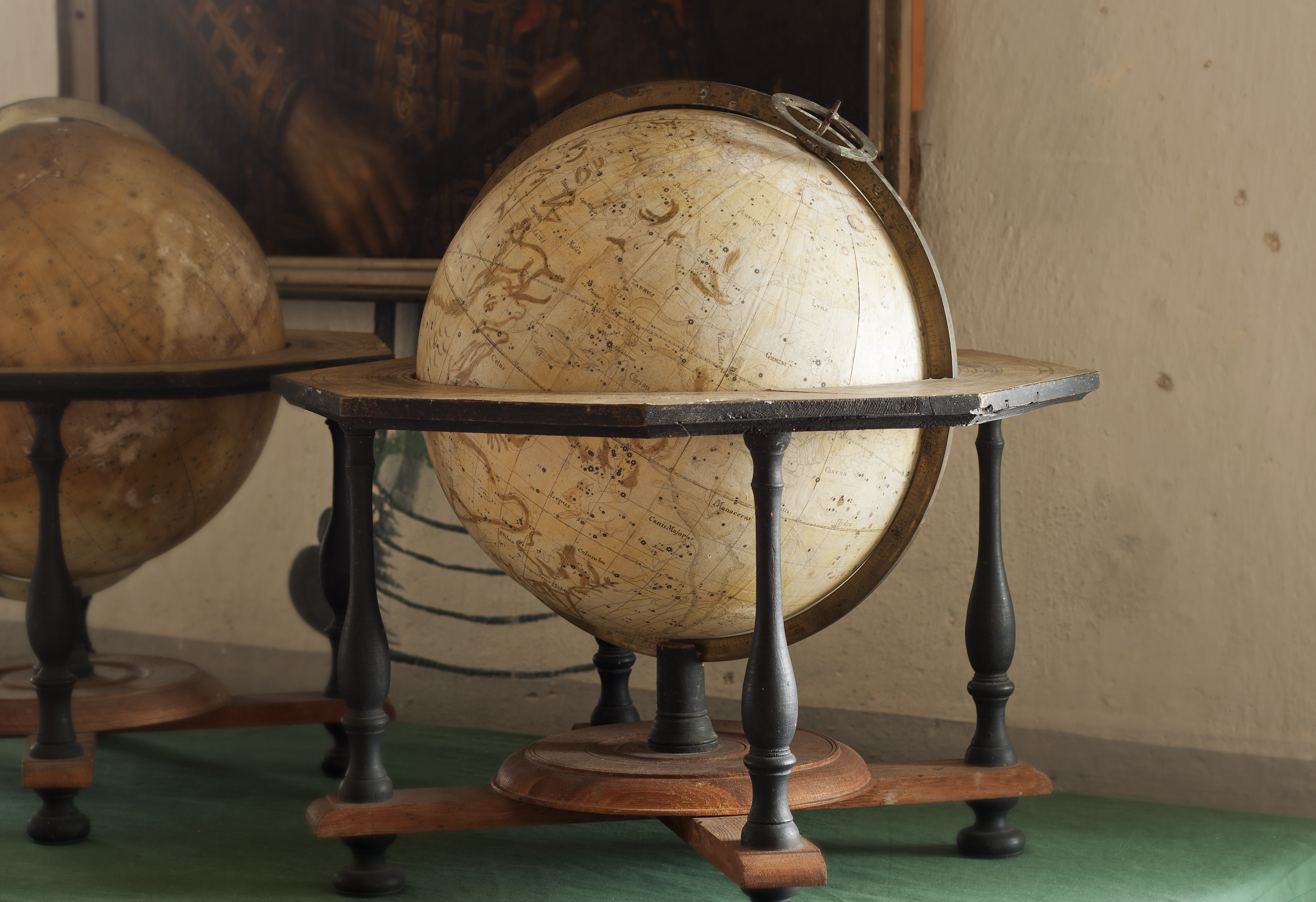
Celestial globe

The first model of globes produced by Åkerman (1759–60), in Skokloster Castle

In 1758 a "cosmographic society" was formed in Uppsala (Kosmografiska sällskapet i Uppsala), consisting of several learned men, including chemist Torbern Bergman and astronomer Pehr Wilhelm Wargentin (who joined somewhat later). Among their aims was to start a domestic production of both terrestrial and celestial globes, in order to propagate geographic knowledge and offer a cheaper alternative than importing globes from abroad, and possibly even to create globes for an export market. At the time, globes had to be imported to Sweden mainly from the Netherlands, France, or Germany.

Åkerman was engaged by the society to produce pairs of terrestrial and celestial globes in three sizes. He began working in 1758 and presented the first terrestrial globe in 1759. It had a diameter of 30 centimetres (12 in), equivalent to one Swedish foot at the time. The following year he had also finalised a model for a celestial globe in the same format. These first globes were not marked with a title or description, but contained a dedication in Latin to Carl Ehrenpreus, chancellor of Uppsala University, and also contained Åkerman's name. (Note: The full text in Latin of the terrestrial globe is: Atlanti Academiae Ups. Scientarumq Reg. Reginq so Senat. Colleg. Nomothet. Praesidi. etc. Illustrissimo Excellent. Comiti ac Domini, Dom. Carolo Ehrenpreus Hanc Globi Terraquei Effigem, Laudum Ipsius campum, Ad recentiss. observationes conformatam. Cosecrat Soecietas Cosmogr. Upsal/Interprete A. Åkerman reg. Soc. Lit. et Scient. Sculptore 1759. The celestial globe carries the inscription: Atlanti Acad. Ups. Scientiarum. R.R.S.s. Coll.Nom.Praes.etc. Illustrmo Excellento Com. ac Domino Dom. C. Ehrenpreus Hunc Globum Celestem Ex Flamstedii Catalogo et recentissimis De la Caillii observationibus ad Annum 1760 adornatum Consecrat Societas Cosmogra. Upss Interprete A. Åkerman Reg.Soc.Scient.Sculptore 1759) In 1760 he could present the pair to the Royal Swedish Academy of Sciences, who expressed their satisfaction and granted Åkerman the privilege of using the title "globemaker to the Academy".

With approval thus obtained, Åkerman established a workshop in Uppsala to produce the globes with the support of the society (not least the wealthy merchant and landowner John Jennings, who was a member). It employed around six or seven persons, with Åkerman himself probably handling the most delicate and scientific parts of the work. From late 1759, commercial production of the first model of globes was underway.

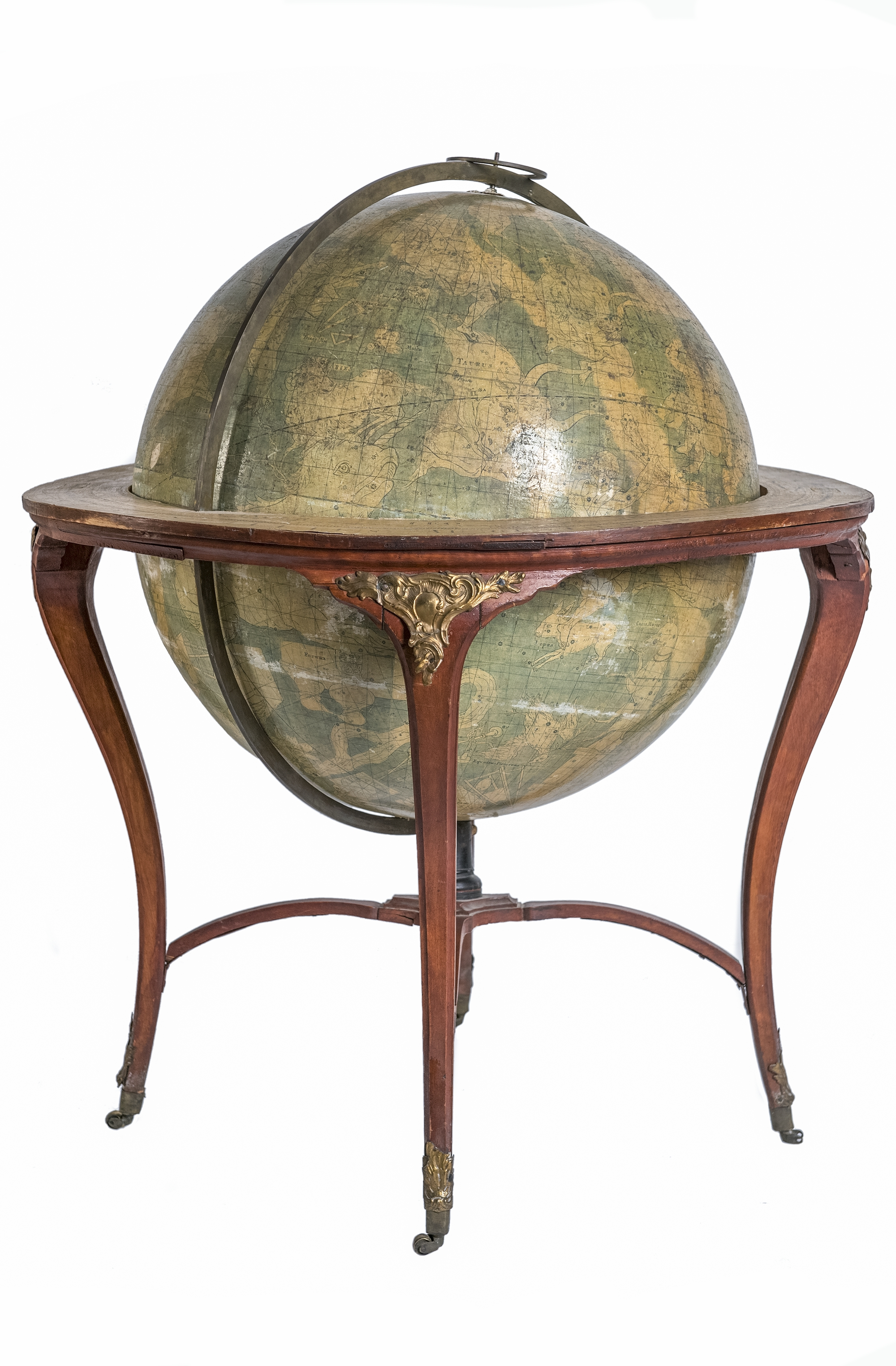
An example of the largest model of globes produced by Åkerman: celestial globe from 1766, now in the collections of the Maritime Museum in Stockholm.

Soon afterwards, the society commissioned Åkerman to expand the range, and in 1762 a pair of globes with a diameter of 11 centimetres (4.3 in) entered the market. (Note: The Latin inscription on the terrestrial globe of this model is: Globus terraqueus Congrugenter recentissimis observationib cura Soc:Cosm:Upsal: adornatus av A.Åkerman R.Soc.Scient:Ups.Sculpt. 1762 The celestial globe bears the inscription: Globus Coelestis cura S.C.Ups. adornatus av A.Åkerman 1762) Only one full set of these globes has been preserved. Of this globe type, one version was also constructed so that the celestial globe could be taken apart and the terrestrial globe fitted inside, a so-called double globe. The 11-cm globes were furthermore accompanied by a brief, printed instruction on the "use and usefulness" of globes, written by one of the members of the cosmographic society, astronomer Fredric Mallet. A third model of two globes with the diameter 59 centimetres (23 in) was finalised in 1766. These globes were more luxurious and have been described as Åkerman's most important globes. (Note: The Latin inscription on the terrestrial globe is: Globus Terraqueus Secundum Adcuratissimas descriptiones Adornatus Cura Andreae Åkerman Reg: Soc: Scient: Ups: Scupltoris. 1766; that of the celestial globe: Globus Coelestis Ex Catalogo Britannico et De la Caillii observatio nibus ad Annum P.C.N. 1800 Cura Soc. Cosmogr. Upsal. delineatus av Andrea Åkerman Reg.S.S.Ups. Sculptore 1766 Magnitudines Stellarum)

Contentwise, the terrestrial globes were made using mainly maps available to Åkerman in the collections of Uppsala University Library, including by cartographers Jean-Baptiste Bourguignon d'Anville and Jacques-Nicolas Bellin. Information obtained from travelogues of recent voyages by George Anson and Charles Marie de La Condamine were also used as sources. Åkerman's first celestial globes were made with the aid of the star catalogues by John Flamsteed and Nicolas-Louis de Lacaille. Åkerman had close contacts with the members of the cosmographic society, not least Mallet, who had a more thorough scientific knowledge and helped Åkerman to produce accurate globes. The globes were made of papier-mâché, which was covered in a layer of gypsum and then polished before engraved strips were applied to form the face of the globe. The larger globes, intended to be placed on the floor, were fitted in stands made in a Rococo style, painted red and decorated with brass details. One pair, made for the Royal Swedish Academy of Sciences, was fitted to a custom-made stand by the royal cabinetmaker Lars Almgren. The smaller globes were given simpler stands.

Åkerman sold globes directly from his workshop; they were also sold through the university in Uppsala, and the office of the Royal Swedish Academy of Sciences in Stockholm. Most were sold on the domestic market. One pair was given as gifts by the Academy of Sciences to the French Academy of Sciences; another three pairs were bought by the Russian Academy of Sciences and shipped to Saint Petersburg in 1771. Globes by Åkerman also found their way to University of Rostock, Märkisches Museum and Forschungsbibliothek Gotha, all in Germany. In Sweden, at least 125 individual globes were noted as still extant in 1968, both in public institutions and private collections.
