= Adolf Ulrik Schützercrantz =

Swedish artist and military officer

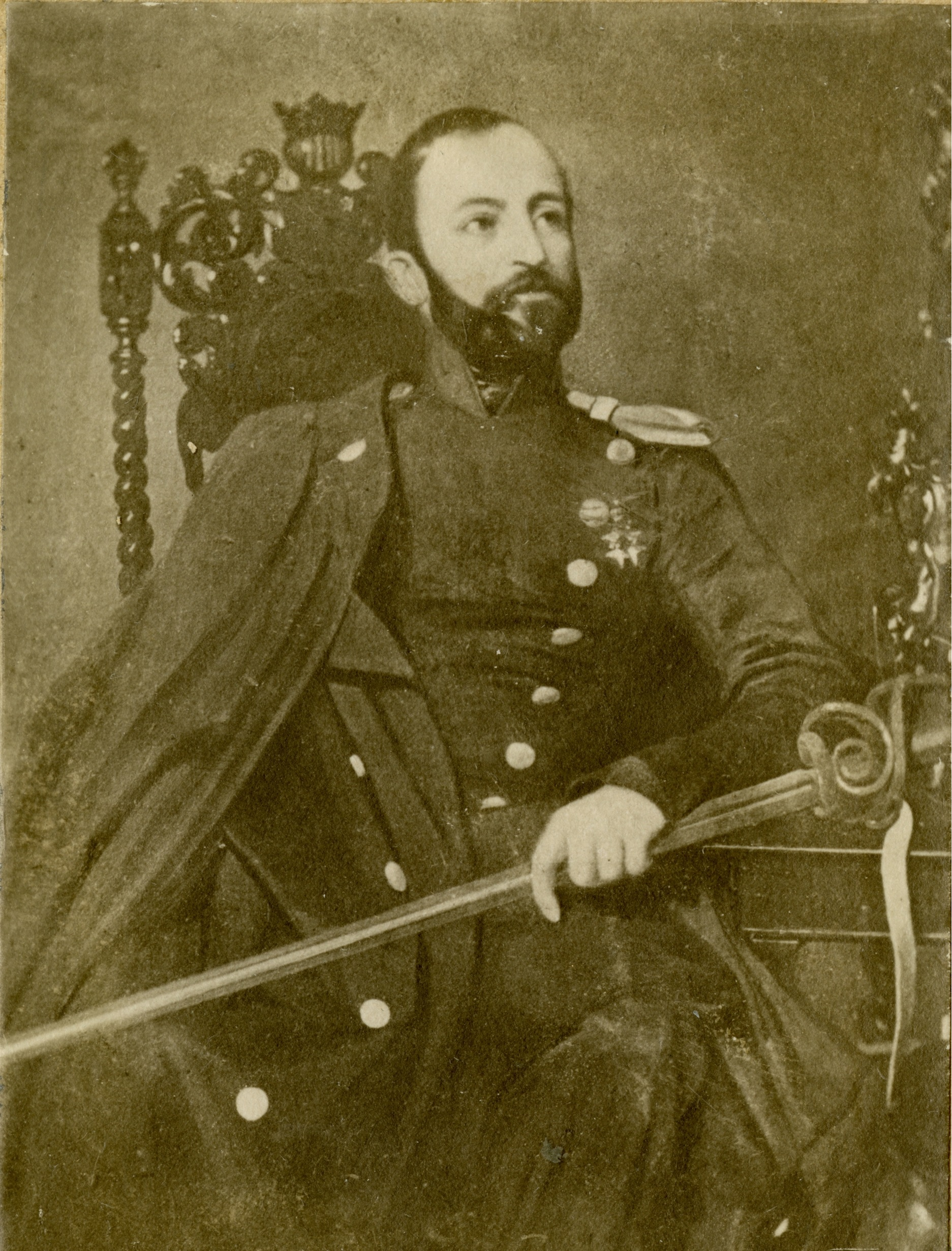
Adolf Ulrik Schützercrantz, portrait by Carl Stefan Bennet

Adolf Ulrik Schützercrantz (25 March 1802 – 9 October 1854) was a Swedish artist and military officer. He served in the Second Life Guards regiment between 1819 and 1851, and was awarded the Order of the Sword in 1839. At the same time, he was active as an artist. He worked in several techniques, producing topographical views, scenes from everyday life, illustrations of costumes and military uniforms, and travel sketches. He was co-founder of the predecessor of the present-day Swedish Association for Art and for a time its secretary. He also participated in the organisation of what would later become the museum Livrustkammaren.

== Background and military career ==
Adolf Ulrik Schützercrantz's father was rear admiral Johan Herman Schützercrantz, who in his youth had fought as a volunteer in the French navy during the American Revolutionary War; he participated in the Battle of the Chesapeake and was later taken prisoner by the British. Adolf Ulrik's grandfather Herman Schützercrantz was a prominent surgeon and member of the Royal Swedish Academy of Sciences. He was a member of the Swedish nobility (friherre); the family originally came from Gdańsk.

He was enrolled in the military at the age of ten, and became a cadet at the Military Academy Karlberg in 1816. He graduated in 1819 and became a fänrik at the Second Life Guards regiment the same year. He would remain there throughout his life, reaching the rank of major upon his retirement from the regiment in 1851. He was awarded the Order of the Sword in 1839.

He died in Stockholm in 1854, of cholera.

== Artistic career ==
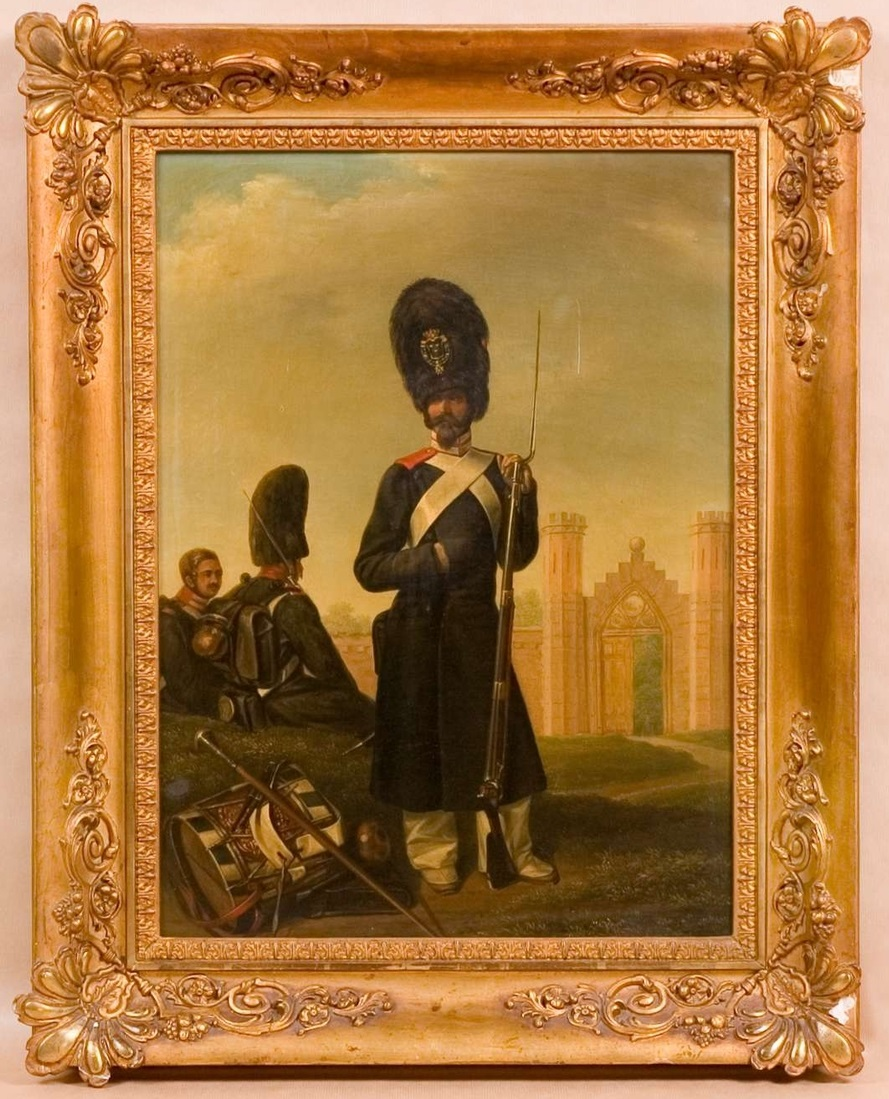
Oil painting by Schützercrantz (På vakt vid Galärkyrkogården; "On Guard at Galärvarvskyrkogården").

In parallel to his military career, Schützercrantz also pursued his artistic interests. He lacked a formal education in art. To some extent he was taught draughtsmanship at the Military Academy, in connection with studies in e.g. cartography and fortification. He may have been privately tutored by Johan Fredrik Julin. He mostly seems to have been an autodidact, however.

He worked in several techniques, but became most recognised for reproductions of his works in lithography. Typically, the subject matters of Schützercrantz' works are depictions of everyday life, sometimes comical (to some extent in the style of Thomas Rowlandson); city scenes or landscapes in the tradition of Pehr Hilleström and Elias Martin; and illustrations of costumes and military uniforms for printed publications.

He made several long journeys, during which he produced drawings and watercolours, and was among the first "tourist artists" of Sweden.In 1829, he thus travelled within Sweden (to Dalarna and Norrland); in 1833 he went to Saxony and Prussia, and the following year to France and Italy. His longest journey, in 1838, brought him via Spain, Portugal and Malta to Greece, western Turkey and Egypt. He was among the first Swedes since Matthias Palbitzki (1623–1677) to bring back drawings and sketches from Greece and the Near East to Sweden.

He participated in the annual exhibition of the Royal Swedish Academy of Fine Arts for the first time in 1826. In 1832 he was among the co-founders of the predecessor of the present-day Swedish Association for Art; he became the association's secretary in 1848. He also helped organise what would shortly afterwards become the museum Livrustkammaren.

== Sources cited ==
- Benson, Adolph B. (1926). Sweden and the American Revolution. New Haven: Tuttle, Morehouse & Taylor. OCLC 1414856625.
- Bohman, Nils; Dahl, Torsten, eds. (1946). Svenska män och kvinnor: biografisk uppslagsbok [Swedish men and women. Biographical dictionary] (in Swedish). Vol. 6. P-Sheldon. Stockholm: Bonnier. OCLC 4629338. SELIBR 53802.
- Elgenstierna, Gustaf (1932). Den introducerade svenska adelns ättartavlor (in Swedish). Vol. VII. Stockholm: P. A. Nordstedt. OCLC 20464762.
- Hofberg, Herman; Heurlin, Frithiof; Millqvist, Viktor; Rubenson, Olof, eds. (1906). Svenskt biografiskt handlexikon [Swedish biographical handbook] (in Swedish). Vol. 2. Stockholm: Bonniers. OCLC 474064019.
- Lundström, Bo (2000–2001). "Adolf Ulrik Schützercrantz". Svenskt biografiskt lexikon (in Swedish). Vol. 31. National Archives of Sweden.
