= Johan Herman Schützercrantz =

Swedish naval officer (1762–1821)

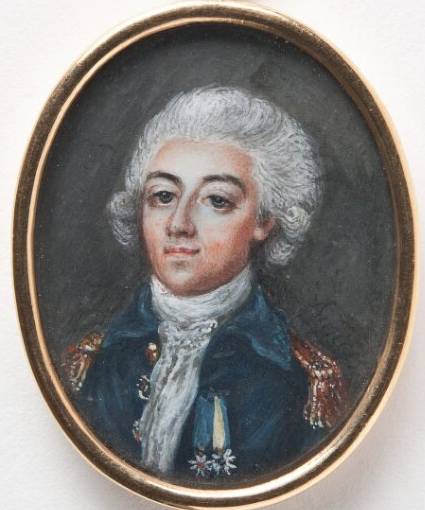
Johan Herman Schützercrantz, detail of a miniature by Anton Ulrik Berndes

Johan Herman Schützercrantz (4 February 1762 – 21 March 1821) was a Swedish naval officer. In his youth, he served with the French in the American Revolutionary War. He participated with distinction in the Battle of the Chesapeake, and was later taken prisoner by the British in West Indian waters. Following his return to Sweden, he pursued a successful career in the Swedish Navy and participated in the Russo-Swedish War of 1788–1790; he was decorated for having taken part in the Battle of Svensksund. He was promoted to rear admiral in 1814. His son, Adolf Ulrik Schützercrantz, was an officer in the Swedish Army and an artist.

== Family background ==
Johan Herman Schützercrantz was the son of Herman Schützercrantz, a prominent surgeon and member of the Royal Swedish Academy of Sciences. His son, Adolf Ulrik Schützercrantz, was an officer in the Swedish Army (Second Life Guard Regiment) and an artist. Johan Herman Schützercrantz was a member of the Swedish nobility (friherre); the family had come to Sweden from Gdańsk in the late 17th century. His sister, Adolfina Lovisa, was married to bishop and statesman Olof Wallquist. Johan Herman Schützercrantz married Lovisa Margareta Lilliestråle in 1794. He was a Freemason.

== Biography ==
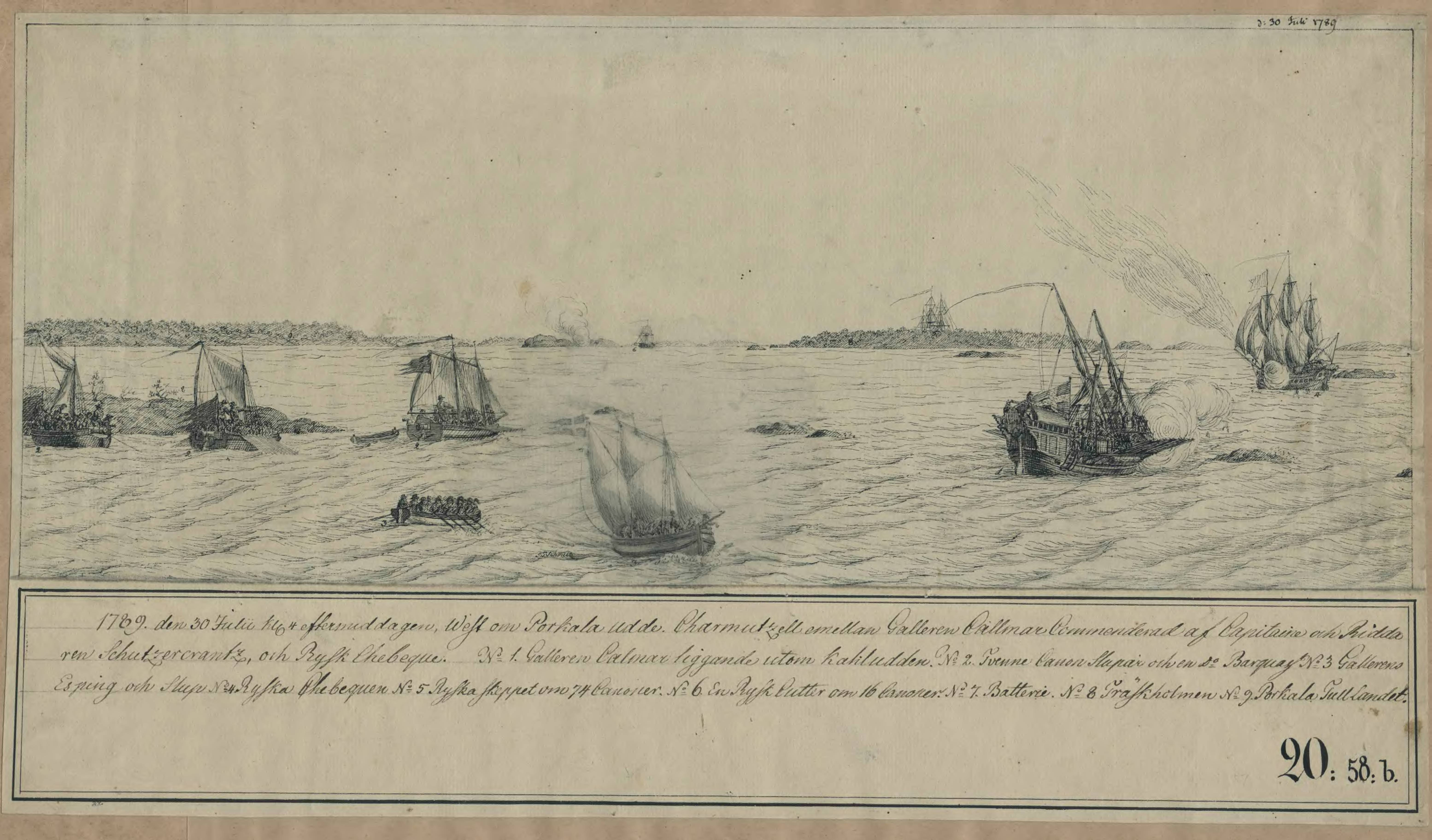
Depiction of a skirmish between the Swedish galley Kalmar, commanded by Schützercrantz, and a Russian xebec, during the Russo-Swedish War of 1788–1790.

Schützercrantz was born in Stockholm and was formally enrolled in the navy as a non-commissioned officer as early as 1768. In 1774 he became a cadet in Karlskrona, and was given the rank of fänrik in 1777. In 1780 he received permission to go abroad and serve in the French Navy, to participate in the American Revolutionary War. In French service he served aboard the Saint-Esprit, and participated on board that ship in the Battle of the Chesapeake. He was promoted to lieutenant de vaisseau on the day of the battle. He was commended for his actions during the battle, mentioned by Admiral François Joseph Paul de Grasse as being worthy of royal favour, together with another fellow Swedish volunteer. Later during the war, he served on board the Solitaire, and was taken prisoner by the British following the capture of the ship in West Indian waters.

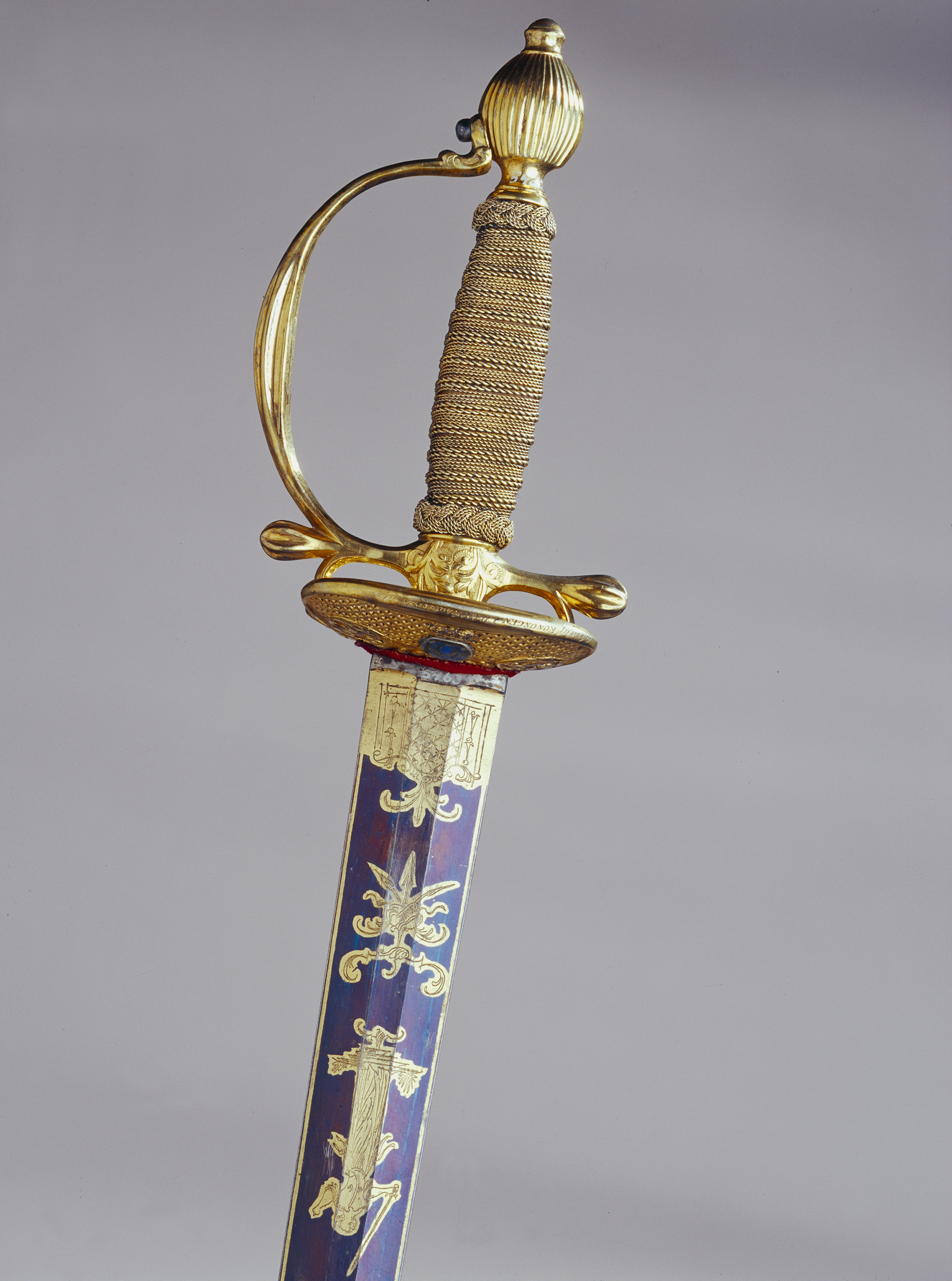
Honorary smallsword awarded to Schützercrantz for bravery during the Russo-Swedish War of 1788–1790.

After the war, he returned to Sweden, and was promoted to lieutenant in the Swedish Navy in 1783, and to captain in 1789. He participated in the Russo-Swedish War of 1788–1790, and commanded the hemmema Starkodder during the Battle of Svensksund. Following the victorious battle, he was promoted to the rank of major in recognition for his actions, together with several other officers. After the war he continued to rise among the ranks, and was finally promoted to the rank of rear admiral in 1814.

== Decorations ==
Johan Herman Schützercrantz was awarded a French decoration for his service during the American Revolutionary War. In Sweden, he was awarded the Order of the Sword in 1783 and the Order of Charles XIII in 1819. He was also awarded a medal for his participation in the Battle of Svensksund, and an honorary smallsword for bravery during the Russo-Swedish war.

== Sources cited ==
- Benson, Adolph B. (1926). Sweden and the American Revolution. New Haven: Tuttle, Morehouse & Taylor. OCLC 1414856625.
- Elgenstierna, Gustaf (1932). Den introducerade svenska adelns ättartavlor (in Swedish). Vol. VII. Stockholm: P. A. Nordstedt. OCLC 20464762.
- Svensksund 1790-1940. En minnesbok utarbetad av Försvarsstabens krigshistoriska avdelning (PDF) (in Swedish). Stockholm: Sveriges Flotta & Sjöhistoriska Samfundet [The Swedish Navy & The Swedish Society for Maritime History]. 1940. OCLC 753246673.
