= Saint-Esprit-class ship of the line =

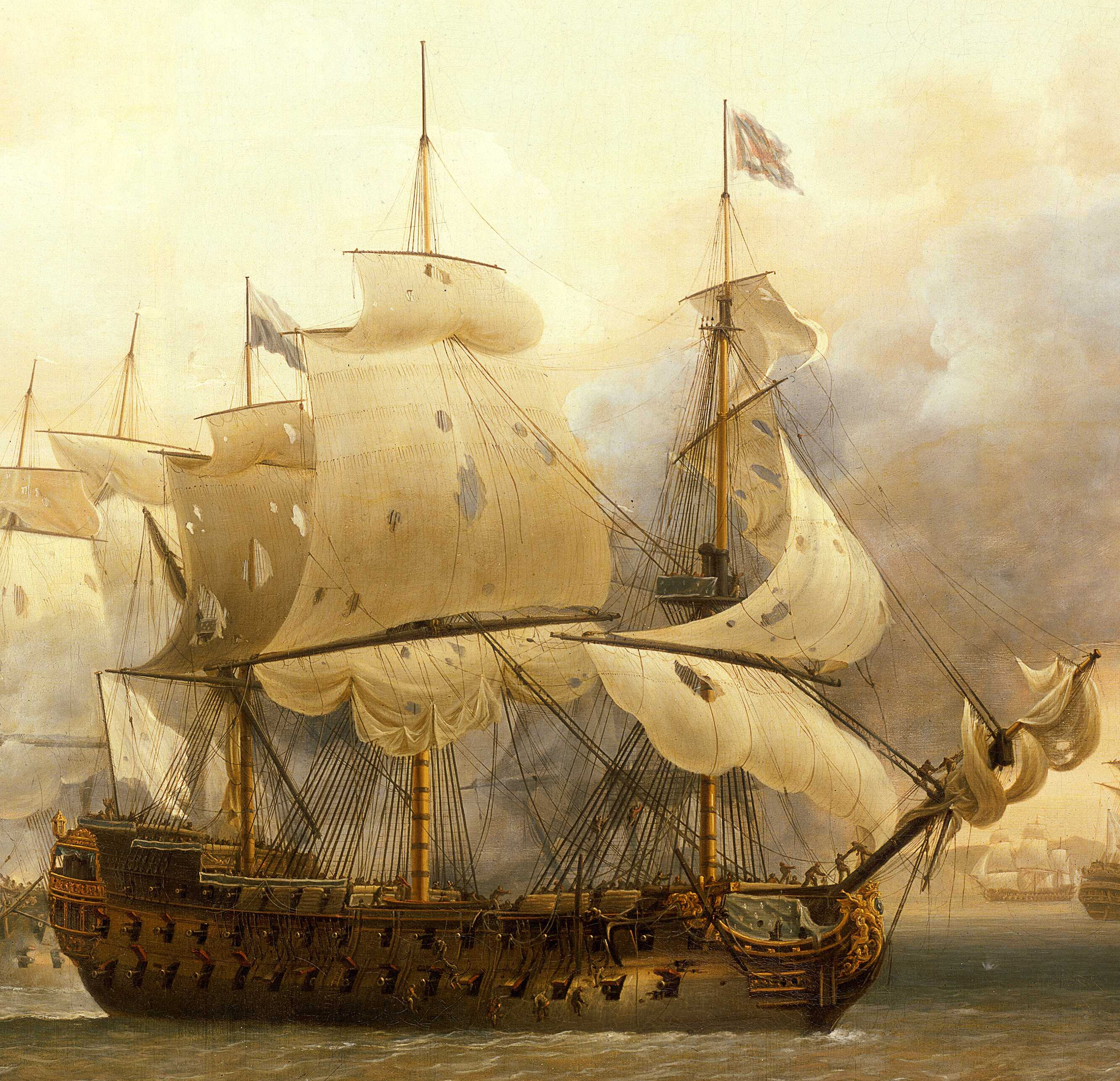
- Saint-Esprit at the Battle of Saint Kitts, 26 January 1782

Class overview
- Name: Saint-Esprit
- Succeeded by: Tonnant class

General characteristics
- Type: Ship of the line
- Displacement: 3800 tonneaux
- Tons burthen: 2050 port tonneaux
- Length: 59.8 m (196 ft 2 in)
- Beam: 14.9 m (48 ft 11 in)
- Draught: 7.5 m (24 ft 7 in)
- Speed: Sail
- Armament: 80 guns: 30 × 36-pounder long guns; 32 × 24-pounder long guns; 18 × 18-pounder long guns
- Armour: Timber

The Saint-Esprit group was a type of three 80-gun ships of the line of the French Navy. They did not constitute a single class, as each was built to a separate design, but they each carried a standard ordnance amounting to 80 guns.

== Ships in class ==
- Saint-Esprit. Renamed Scipion.

Builder: Brest
Ordered: 11 January 1762
Launched: 12 October 1765
Fate: Lost in storm on 26 January 1795

- Languedoc, renamed Anti-fédéraliste and Victoire.

Builder: Toulon
Ordered: 9 December 1761
Launched: 15 May 1766
Fate: Broken up in 1799 in Brest

- Couronne.

Builder: Arsenal of Brest
Ordered: 1766
Launched: May 1768
Fate: Accidentally burnt at Brest in 1781. A replacement, Couronne was constructed from the salvaged remains. Renamed Ça Ira in 1792, this ship was captured by Britain on 14 March 1795, destroyed in an accidental fire on 11 April 1796.

== Bibliography ==
- Roche, Jean-Michel (2005). Dictionnaire des bâtiments de la flotte de guerre française de Colbert à nos jours [Dictionary of French Warships from Colbert to Today] (in French). Vol. 1: 1671-1870. Roche. ISBN 978-2-9525917-0-6. OCLC 165892922.
- Winfield, Rif & Roberts, Stephen S. (2017). French Warships in the Age of Sail 1626-1786: Design, Construction, Careers and Fates. Seaforth Publishing. ISBN 978-1-4738-9351-1.
