= Ramvik =

Locality in Västernorrland County, Sweden

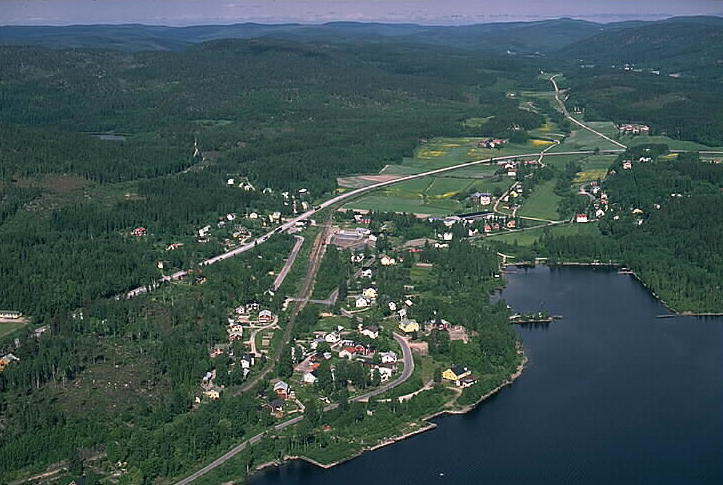
- June 1988 aerial photograph of Ramvik

- Location within Västernorrland Location within Sweden
- Coordinates: 62°49′N 17°51′E
- Country: Sweden
- Province: Ångermanland
- County: Västernorrland County
- Municipality: Härnösand Municipality and Kramfors Municipality

Area
  - Total: 1.89 km^{2} (0.73 sq mi)

Population (31 December 2010)
  - Total: 691
  - Density: 366/km^{2} (950/sq mi)
- Time zone: UTC+1 (CET)
  - Summer (DST): UTC+2 (CEST)
- Climate: Dfb

Ramvik (Swedish: [ˈrɑ̂ːmviːk]) is a locality situated in Härnösand Municipality in Västernorrland County, Sweden with 691 inhabitants in 2010. Before 2015, part of the locality belonged to Kramfors Municipality. Also in 2015, the urban area was divided and the northern part around Ramvik formed a small town, while the southern part around Hälledal formed a separate urban area that took over the urban area code from Ramvik.

Ramvik was the home of Swedish politician Thorbjörn Fälldin.
