= Ramsås =

Coordinates: 62°42′00″N 17°47′00″E

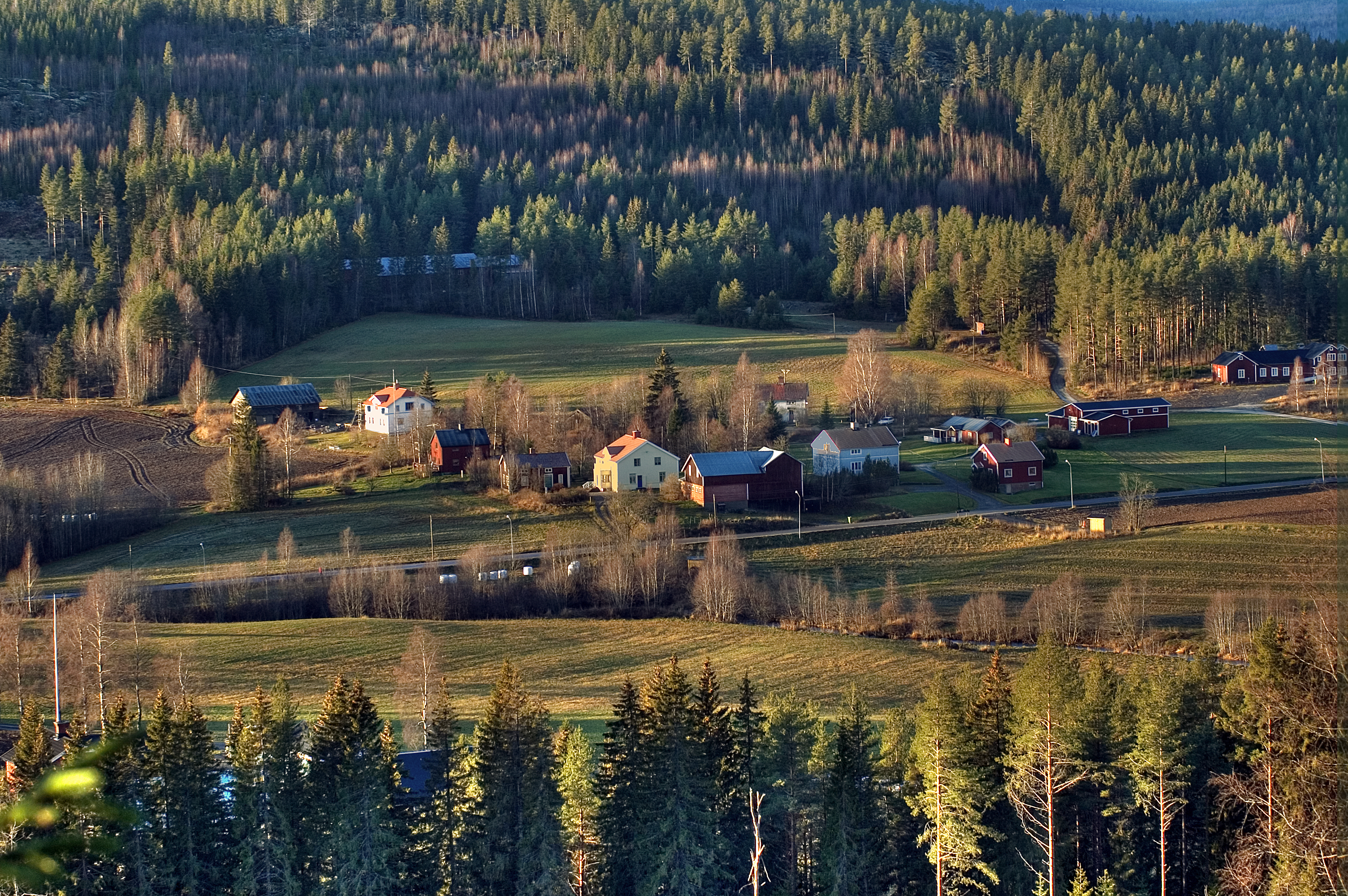
Ramsås

Ramsås (Swedish pronunciation: [ˈrǎmːsɔs]) is a village in Härnösand Municipality, Sweden.
