= Anders Bure =

Swedish cartographer (1571–1646)

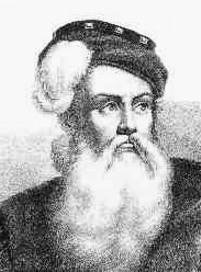
- Later depiction of Anders Bure; no contemporary portraits exist of him.
- Born: Andreas Bureus; 14 August 1571; Säbrå, Sweden
- Died: 4 February 1646 or 24 February 1646 (aged 74); Stockholm, Sweden
- Spouse: Kjerstin Krabbe (m. 1604)
- Family: Bure kinship

Anders Bure (before his ennoblement Andreas Bureus; 14 August 1571 – 4 February 1646) (Note: The death date of Bure is however given as 24 February in the epitaph of Bure in Husby-Långhundra Church.) was a Swedish cartographer, considered the "father of Swedish cartography". He worked in the royal chancery (the precursor to the Government offices) and in 1603 was commissioned to produce a map of the Nordic countries by the future King Charles IX of Sweden. He produced a first map, covering the northern parts of Sweden, in 1611; it was considerably more accurate than earlier attempts at mapmaking and has been called the first real map of Sweden. It was followed by a more comprehensive map of Scandinavia in 1626, which would become a model for mapmakers for generations. In 1628, he became de facto the first head of Lantmäteriet, the Swedish Mapping, Cadastral, and Land Registration Authority. The instructions he produced for the agency's work were in force for over two centuries. He was ennobled in 1624.

== Biography and employment ==
Little is known about Bure's early life. He was born on 14 August 1571 in the parsonage of Säbrå; his parents were Engelbertus Laurentii Bureus and his first wife Elisabet Andersdotter of the Bure kinship. His father was a pastor, who had participated in Uppsala Synod, an important event in the Reformation in Sweden, as well as in two assemblies of the Riksdag of the Estates. Two of his brothers also became prominent: Jonas Bure became head of the National Archives of Sweden, and his other brother Olof Bure became physician to King Gustavus Adolphus and also became mayor of Stockholm. Anders Bure probably studied at Uppsala University or at a university abroad. It is also possible that he received training in astronomy from his cousin, the polymath Johannes Bureus, or perhaps from Johannes Rudbeckius.

The first tangible information about the life of Bure dates from 1602, when he was assigned to bring order to a collection of documents for the royal chancery (the precursor to the Government offices), later filed in the national archive. The job had earlier been offered to his cousin, who turned it down. During this period, Bure acquired an astrolabe and, together with his cousin and a third person, produced a map of Stockholm. Johannes Bureus further mentions in his diary that Anders Bure discussed the use of astronomical instruments with him and made observations of stars from Stockholm Palace on at least one occasion.

He would continue working within the royal chancery with a variety of tasks, including diplomatic tasks concerning the Tsardom of Russia. In 1605 and again in 1634, he accompanied delegations to Russia, and he participated in a commission to regulate the border with Russia following the Treaty of Stolbovo. He also participated in the negotiations leading to the Treaty of Knäred, which ended the Kalmar War in 1613.

He married Kjerstin Krabbe in 1604 and was ennobled in 1624, at the same time as his brother Jonas; until his ennoblement, he used Bureus as his family name. He died on 4 February 1646 in Stockholm, and is buried in Husby-Långhundra Church.

== Cartography ==
=== Lapponia, Bure's first map ===
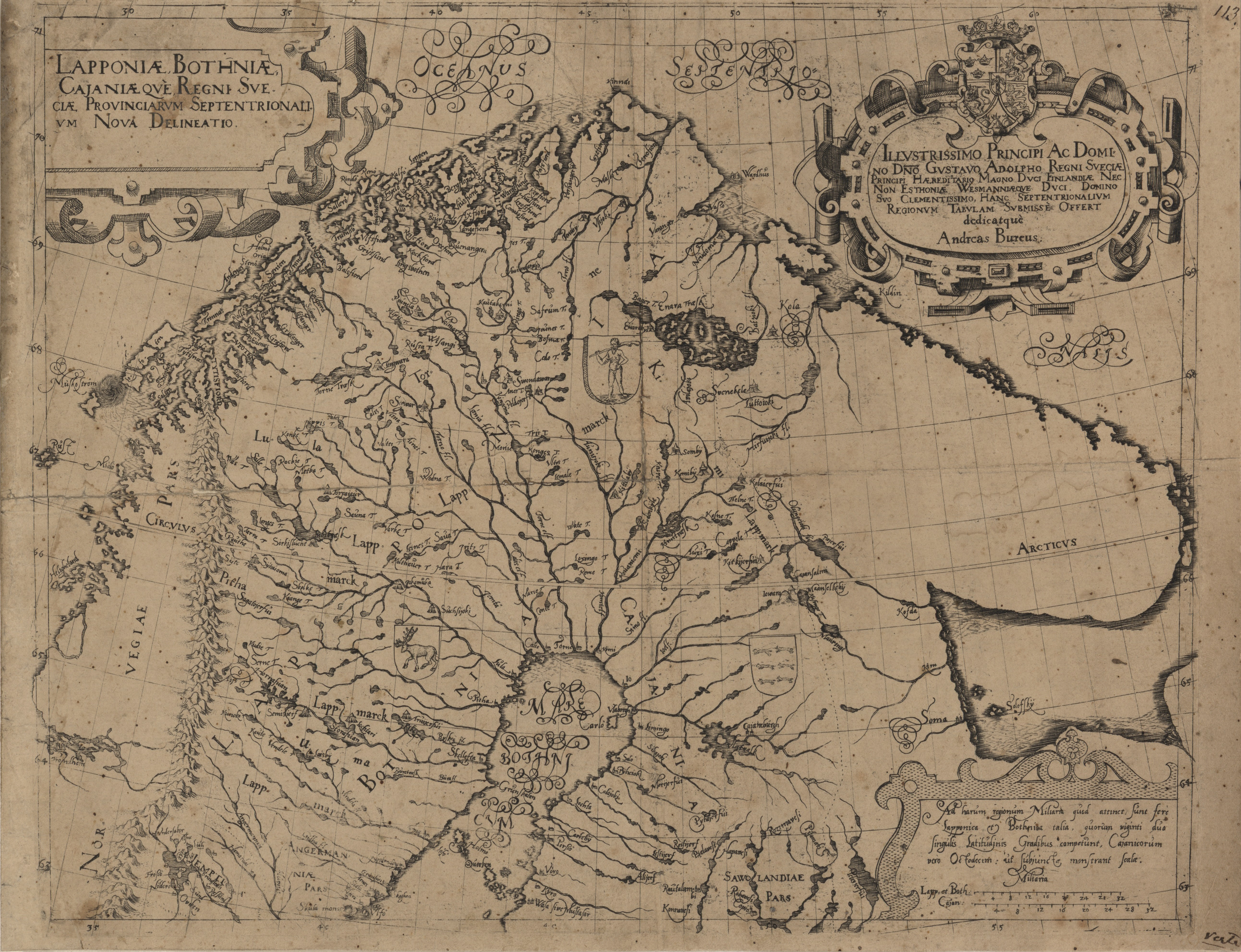
One of only two preserved originals of Lapponia from 1611. From Uppsala University Library, previously in Trolleholm Castle.

Anders Bure has been called the "father of Swedish cartography". In 1603, Bure received a commission from the future King Charles IX of Sweden (at the time Duke Charles) to make a map of the Nordic countries, with the specification that it should show all provinces and cities of Sweden. Charles had a personal interest in mapmaking, and his successor Gustavus Adolphus, who Bure would also work for, personally used maps frequently, both during his military campaigns and in peacetime. However, the immediate reason for commissioning the map was ongoing border disputes with Denmark and Russia. There were also broader political, military and administrative reasons for the Swedish state to take an interest in mapmaking, and within a few generations the state would finance and orchestrate the complete mapping of the country.

Bure produced a first map in 1611, covering the northern part of Sweden, usually referred to as Lapponia. (Note: Its full Latin title is Lapponise, Bothniae Cajaniseque regni Suecie provinciarum septentrionalium nova delineatio sculpta anno domini 1611. An approximate English translation is: "A new outline of Lapland, Bothnia [i.e., Ostrobothnia, West Bothnia and North Bothnia] and Kainuu, the northern provinces of the kingdom of Sweden, engraved in the year of our Lord 1611.") The limited range of this map has been connected with the geopolitical ambitions of Charles IX, who entertained plans for a Swedish expedition towards the Arctic Ocean. The map was based on substantial research, both archival research and, apparently, field studies, and was considerably more accurate than earlier depictions of the region. For example, the river systems and lakes of northern Sweden are rendered in a basically correct way. While nautical charts and relatively accurate maps existed for many areas around Sweden, no reliable map had hitherto been made of the country; the Carta marina made by Olaus Magnus in 1539 was geographically inaccurate (though ethnographically important). Swedish archivist and historian Alf Åberg therefore called it the "first map of Sweden worth its name". Historian Erik Vennberg notes in the Dictionary of Swedish National Biography (Svenskt biografiskt lexikon) that "through its level of detail and correctness" the map constituted "extraordinary progress for its time, and was unprecedented in the Nordic countries". The map has furthermore been an important source for discussions about the early modern history of Sámi peoples. It depicts several Sámi settlements and siidas; the exact interpretation of the information on Bure's map is a subject of debate.

=== Map of Scandinavia ===
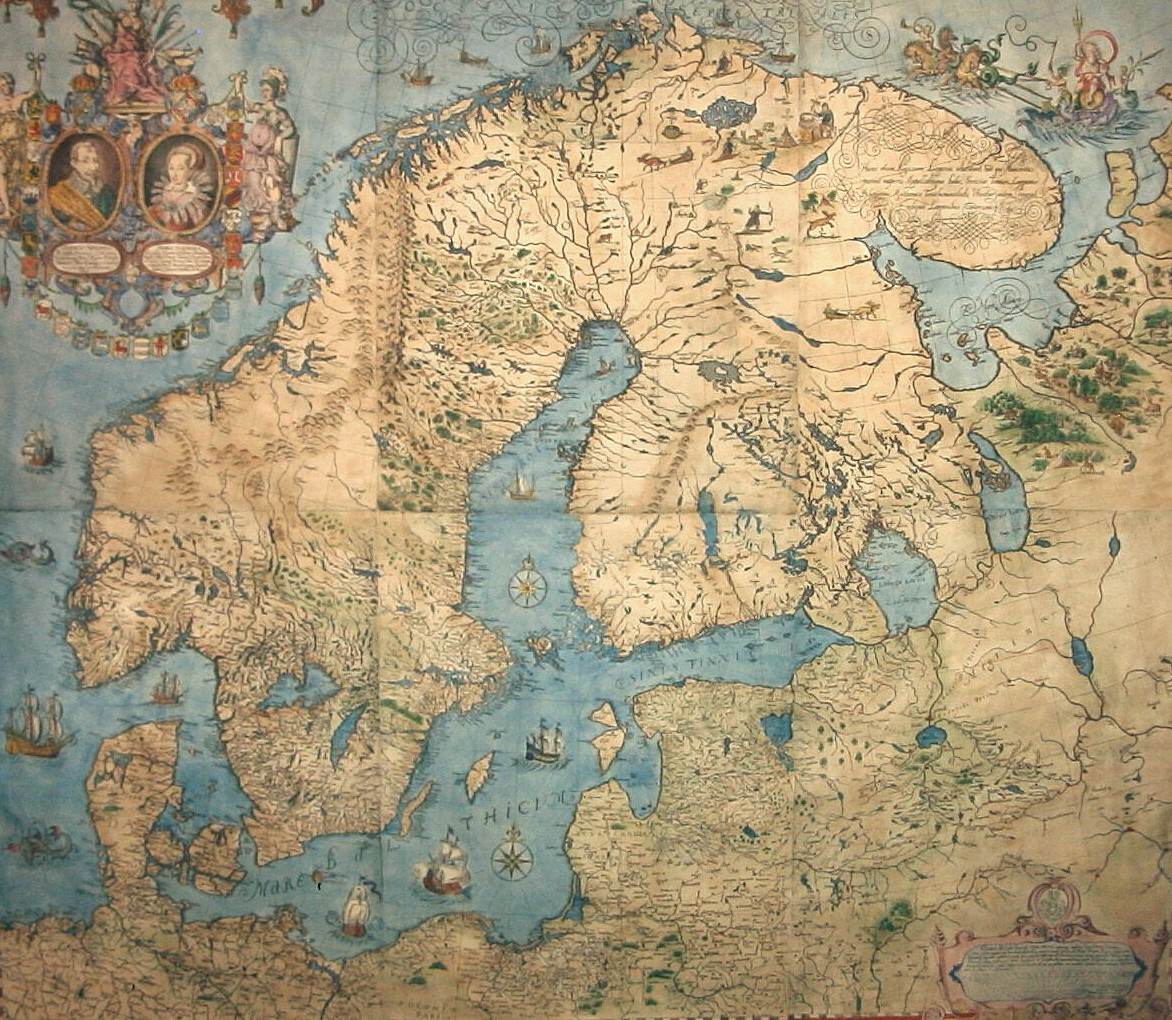
Bure's 1626 map of Scandinavia, from the collections of the National Library of Sweden. A total of seven copies of the original print run are known to have survived.

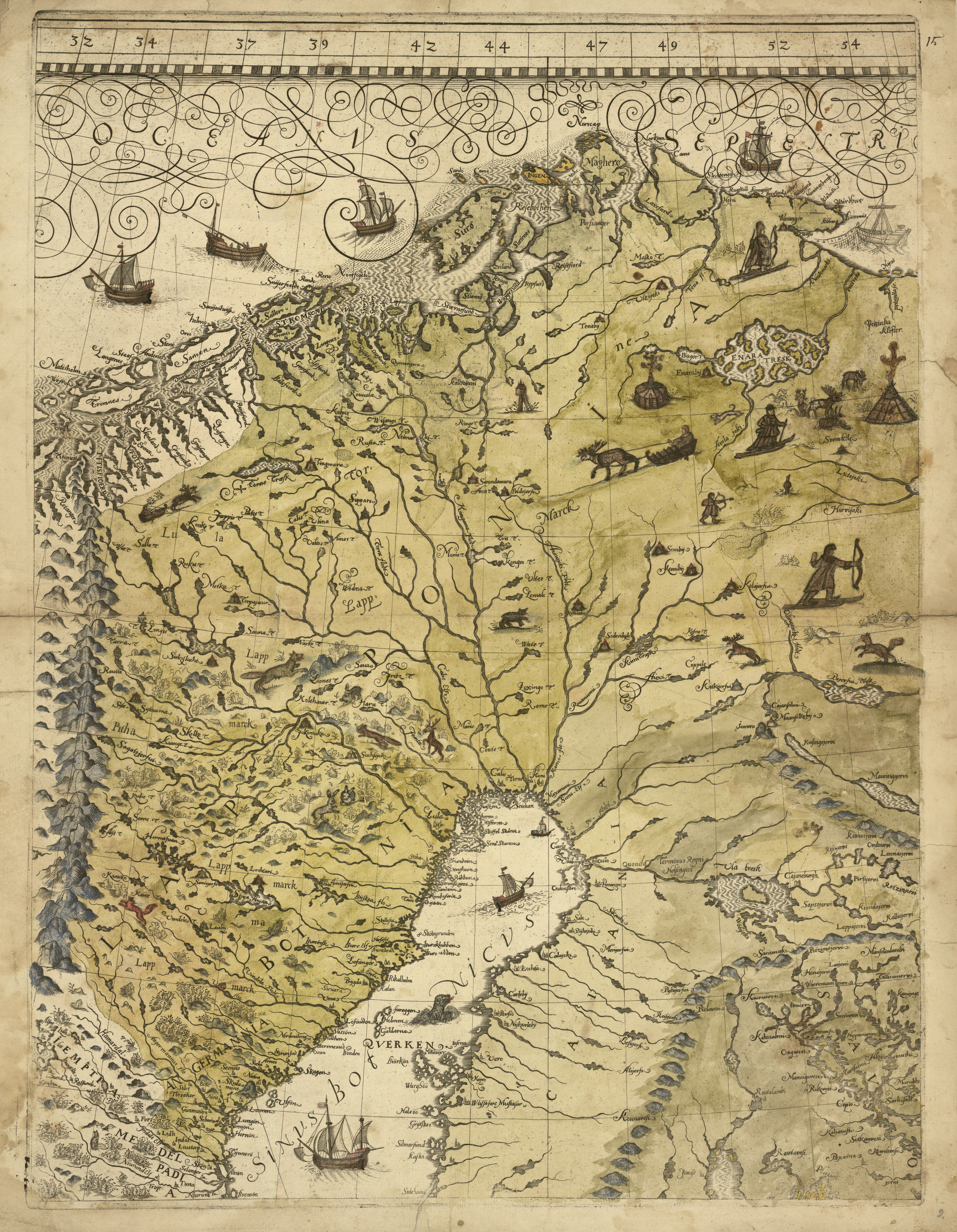
One of the six separate sheets that make up Bure's map of Scandinavia, in a hand-coloured version.

Two years after the publication of Lapponia, Bure also published a small map of the large lake Mälaren and its surroundings. He then worked for several years on the map he had originally been commissioned to make. Funding was supplied through royal patronage, including through a gift from King Gustavus Adolphus of more than 1,000 bibles, which Bure was to sell in order to get more money to the project. In 1626 he published the map, covering most of Scandinavia, the present-day Baltic states and parts of Russia and northern Germany. (Note: Its Latin title is Orbis arctoi nova et accurata delineato. An approximate English translation is: "A new and reliable description of the northern world.") The map measures 113 by 117 centimetres (44 by 46 in), employs a simple conic projection, and a scale of 1:2,000,000. It was published in six sheets and accompanied by a commentary. This map was based on even more thorough research, extensive personal travels, and also data from contemporary Dutch maps. It was also less fantastical and lacked the depictions of imaginary beasts that decorate Carta marina, though in the northern parts of Scandinavia, Bure included images of reindeer and a bear. According to the historian of cartography Günter Schilder, the result "marked a definite breakthrough in Swedish cartography and significant advance in the representation of that region." It was quickly copied by cartographers abroad and became widely distributed through atlases, and formed the basis for almost all maps of Sweden published outside the country until the end of the 18th century. Seven copies of the original print run are known to have survived in libraries and archives. A facsimile edition was published in 1936.

The commentary that accompanied the map is anonymous, but it seems plausible that it was written by Bure, perhaps assisted by his cousin Johannes Bureus. It is a nationalistic, Gothicist pamphlet, containing a description of Sweden but also boastful claims about a heroic past of Sweden. For example, it contains a comment on the lack of older written sources from Sweden, which the author attributes to the decline of the runic alphabet, implicating that if Swedish culture and history were only more well-known, they would be comparable to those of Ancient Greece or Rome.

=== Head of the Mapping, Cadastral and Land Registration Authority ===
Although Bure's work as a map-maker highlighted the importance of maps, the large scale of his maps limited their use in detailed administrative tasks. King Gustavus Adolphus however followed up on Bure's successes by creating a national body responsible for producing maps that could be of use both militarily and administratively, against a wider backdrop of "expansion abroad and consolidation at home", as put by the historian of geography Elizabeth Baigent. Bure was given the task of training new land surveyors, and to carry out a systematic mapping of Sweden. He was given the title Generalmatematikus ("general mathematician"), a unique title in Swedish administration, only bestowed once through history. Thereby he became the first de facto head of Lantmäteriet, the Swedish Mapping, Cadastral and Land Registration Authority. He set about training six surveyors, among them some who had collaborated with Bure in his earlier projects, and several of them had studied astronomy, mathematics or geometry at Uppsala University. The surveying task itself was comprehensive: all villages were to be mapped, with their fields, meadows, woodlands and bogs and other unusable land marked in separate colours. Rivers, lakes and harbours were also to be mapped. Furthermore, the surveyors were not only to produce maps, but also propose improvements in land use. In fact, the King viewed the project as a wider modernisation programme, intended to propel Sweden forward through both investigation and action.

The exact reason for this large undertaking has been a matter of debate. Since the late Middle Ages, an increasingly systematic effort had been underway in Sweden to register land holdings, as land was subject of direct taxation. It has been argued that the systematic mapping of the country would give the state a tool for more efficient and transparent levy of taxes. The maps were also used, in some cases, in this way. Nonetheless, it has also been argued that the main reason for the mapping project was not fiscal, but military or more broadly economical, or as part of a wider modernisation project.

Bure himself left the authority after some time, but the instructions he wrote for the agency would be applied for the next 200 years. The mapping efforts begun under Bure's tutelage in 1628 also led to a systematic survey of the entire country. By 1700, Sweden had the most systematic series of cadastral maps in the world. His successor as head of the authority was Carl Gripenhielm, and under his leadership a more detailed map was produced in 1688. During the 17th century several territories outside modern-day Sweden were part of the Swedish Empire. The surveying and mapping therefore also extended to Finland, where surveying began in 1633 under the same premises, and to the Swedish provinces in the present-day Baltic states, as well as to Pomerania and Mecklenburg in present-day Germany, where surveying increased during the 1680s. Conversely, Gotland and Scania, which became Swedish later, and much of inland Lapland remained unmapped for a longer time.
