= Säbrå =

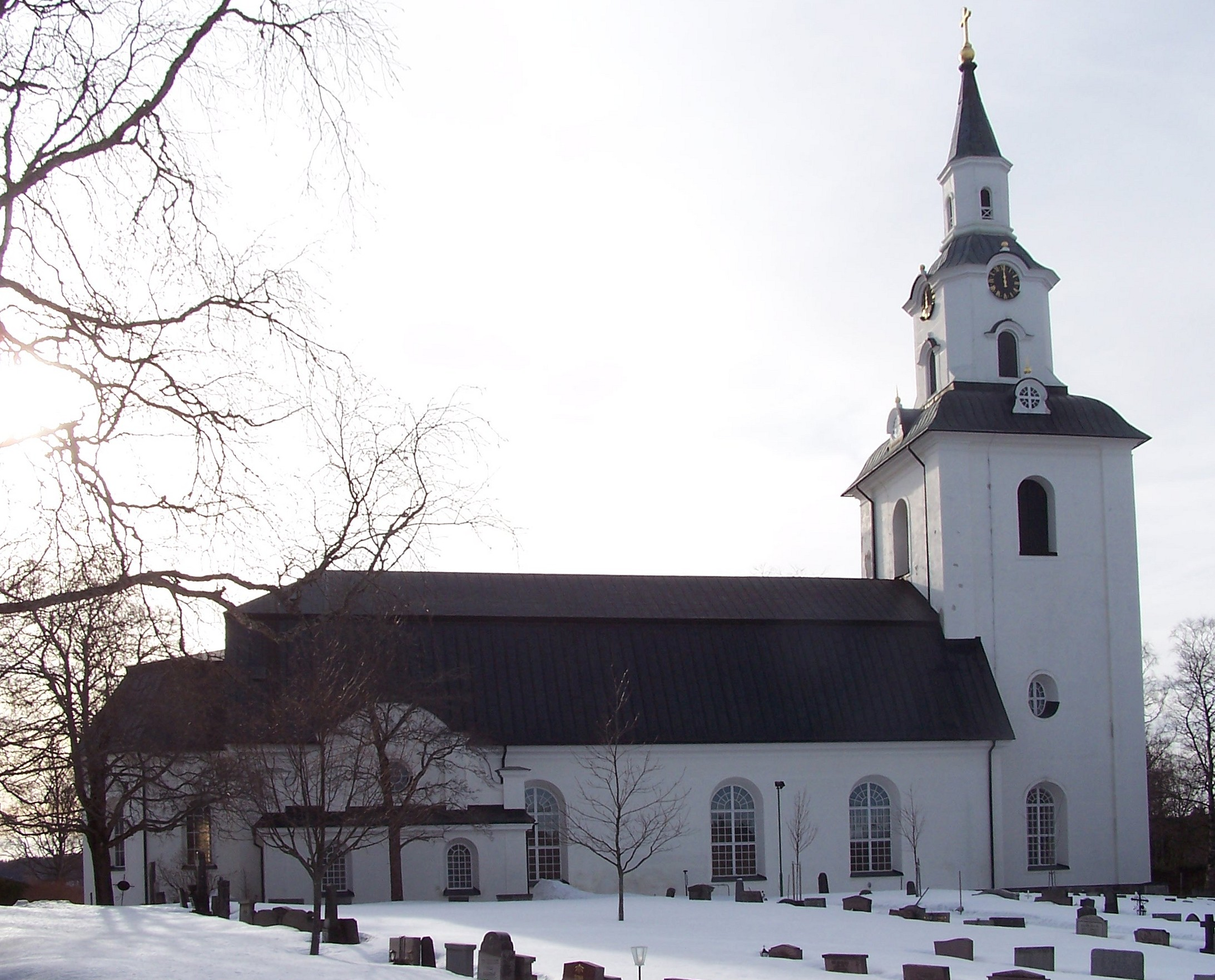
- Säbrå Church

- Location within Västernorrland Location within Sweden
- Coordinates: 62°38′32″N 17°51′01″E
- Country: Sweden
- Province: Ångermanland
- County: Västernorrland County
- Municipality: Härnösand Municipality

Säbrå is a settlement in Härnösand Municipality, Västernorrland County, Sweden.

Säbrå Church was built after the Russian Pillage of 1719–1721. Its present appearance dates largely from changes made in 1758–1759, though the tower was added as late as 1860. Its interior was substantially changed in 1898 and restored in 1950. Adjacent to the church is the former residence of the Bishop of Härnösand, built in 1814; after the death of Bishop Frans Michael Franzén in Säbrå in 1847 the building functioned as the summer residence of the bishop.

Cartographer Anders Bure (1571–1646) was born in Säbrå.
