= Älandsbro =

- Location within Västernorrland Location within Sweden
- Coordinates: 62°40′N 17°50′E
- Country: Sweden
- Province: Ångermanland
- County: Västernorrland County
- Municipality: Härnösand Municipality

Area
  - Total: 1.56 km^{2} (0.60 sq mi)

Population (31 December 2010)
  - Total: 832
  - Density: 534/km^{2} (1,380/sq mi)
- Time zone: UTC+1 (CET)
  - Summer (DST): UTC+2 (CEST)
- Climate: Dfb

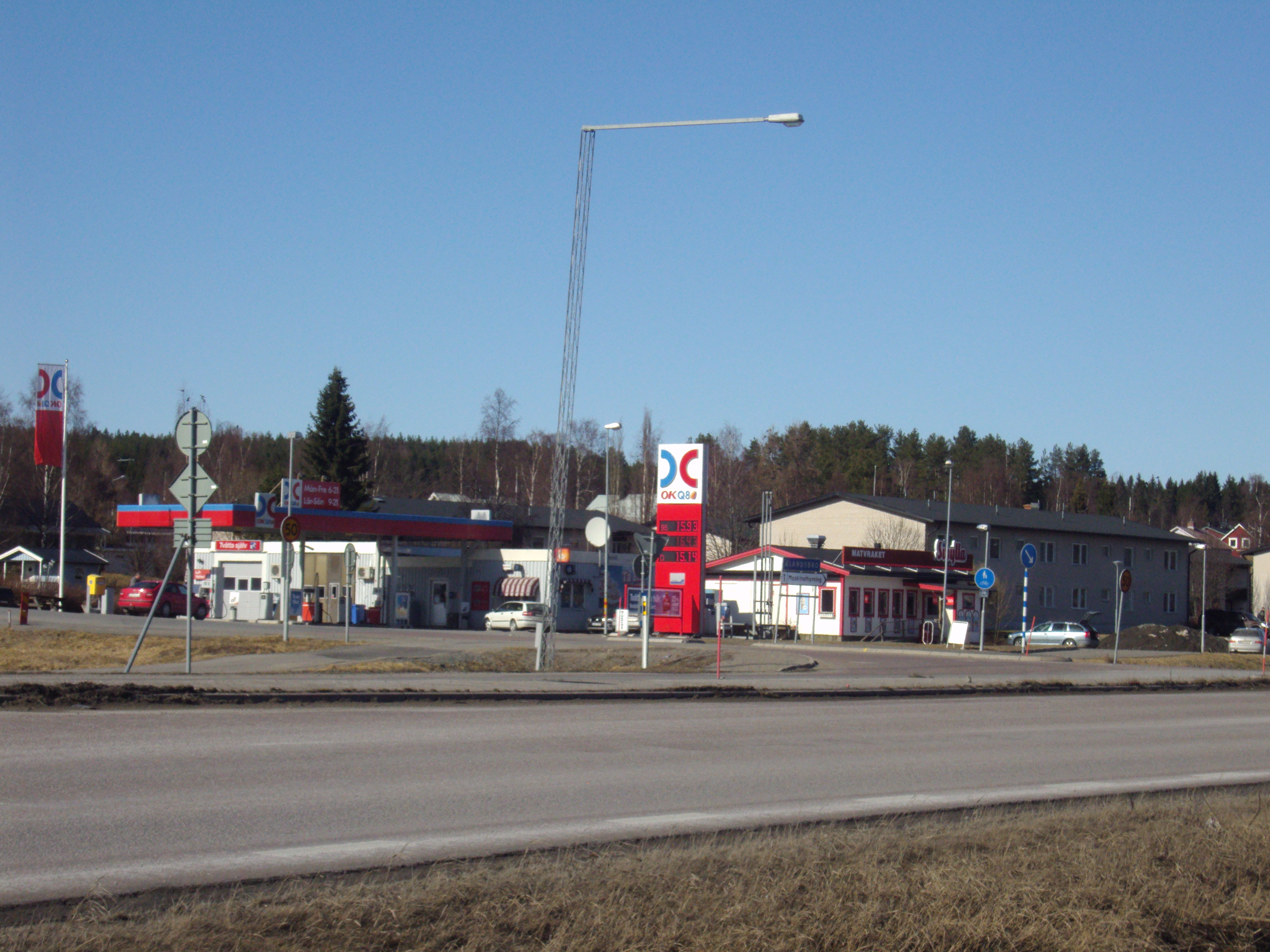
Älandsbro au printemps

Älandsbro (Swedish pronunciation: [ɛlansˈbruː]) is a locality situated in Härnösand Municipality, Västernorrland County, Sweden with 832 inhabitants in 2010.
