= Fredrik Akrel =

Swedish globe maker and artist (1748 – 1804)

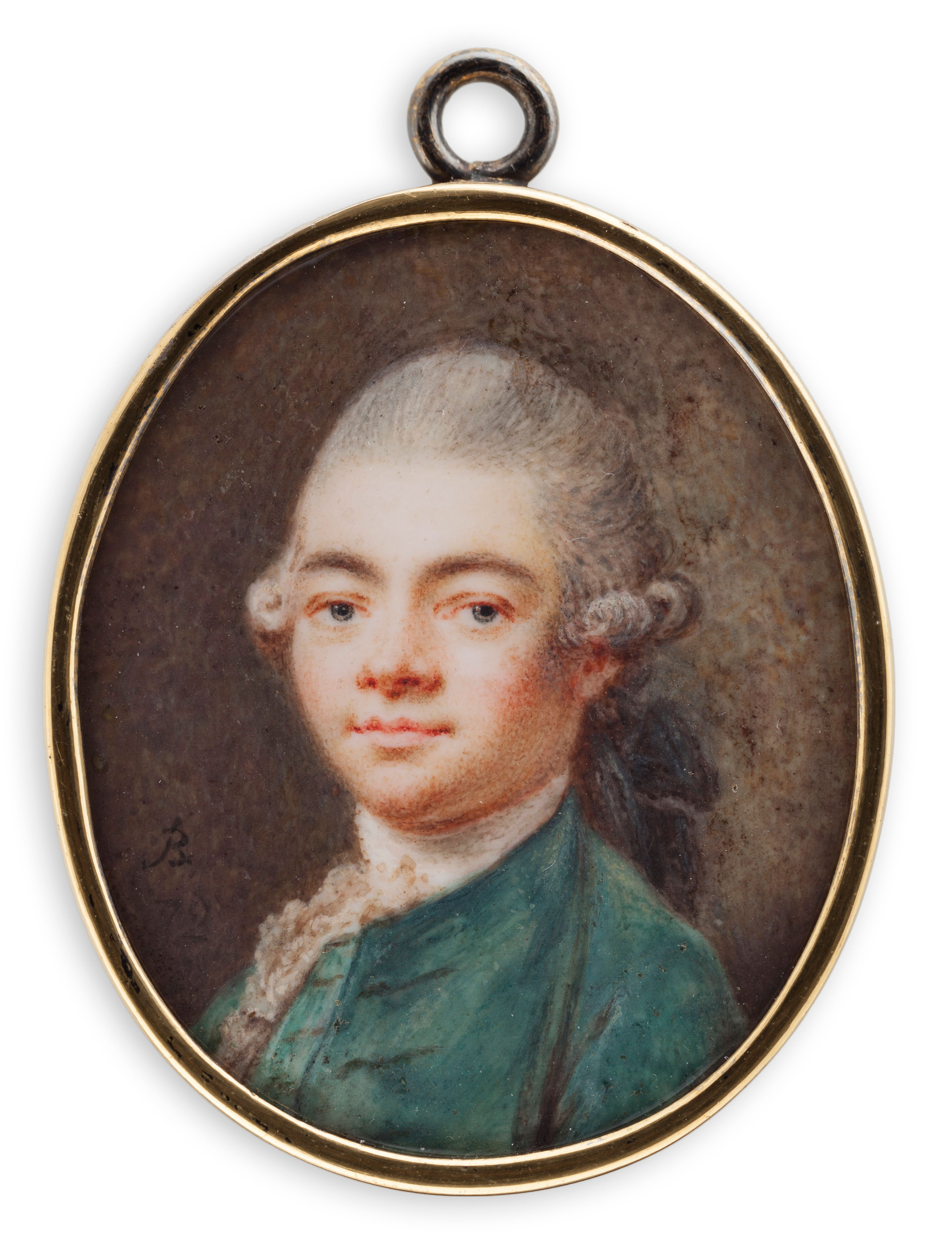
Fredrik Akrel, portrait miniature by Anton Ulrik Berndes

Fredrik Akrel (27 May 1748 – 6 November 1804) was a Swedish globe maker and artist.

Fredrik Akrel was born in present-day Eskilstuna Municipality. His father was a vicar. His mother, Elisabeth Castrén, came from Karelia. His son, Carl Fredrik Akrel, became a general in the Swedish Army and a cartographer.

Fredrik Akrel studied at Uppsala University, where he learnt engraving from Anders Åkerman. After moving to Stockholm around 1770, he made a career illustrating scientific and popular books. In 1773–1774 he travelled to Paris with the aim of furthering his artistic studies. However, the trip appears to have had little effect on his development, and furthermore he was robbed of his travel funds and had to return prematurely to Sweden. After his return, he was employed by Carl Bergqvist, the engraver of the Royal Swedish Academy of Sciences, and following Bergqvist's death in 1778, Akrel took over his position at the academy.

In 1778 his former teacher Åkerman died, and Akrel was given the opportunity to take over the globe manufacturing workshop. At the same time, the workshop was moved from Uppsala to Stockholm and subordinated to the Academy of Sciences. Akrel engaged actively with his new tasks, seeking to modernise the geographic content of the globes produced in light of new geographic discoveries and consequently updated the globe models developed by Åkerman. From 1781 he employed an apprentice, Erik Åkerland, who with time would take over successively more of the daily running of the workshop. The death of Akrel's wife in 1797 appears to have weighed heavily on him, and his engagement in the workshop diminished even more. He died in Stockholm in 1804.
