= French ship Saint-Esprit =

Ship of the line of the French Navy

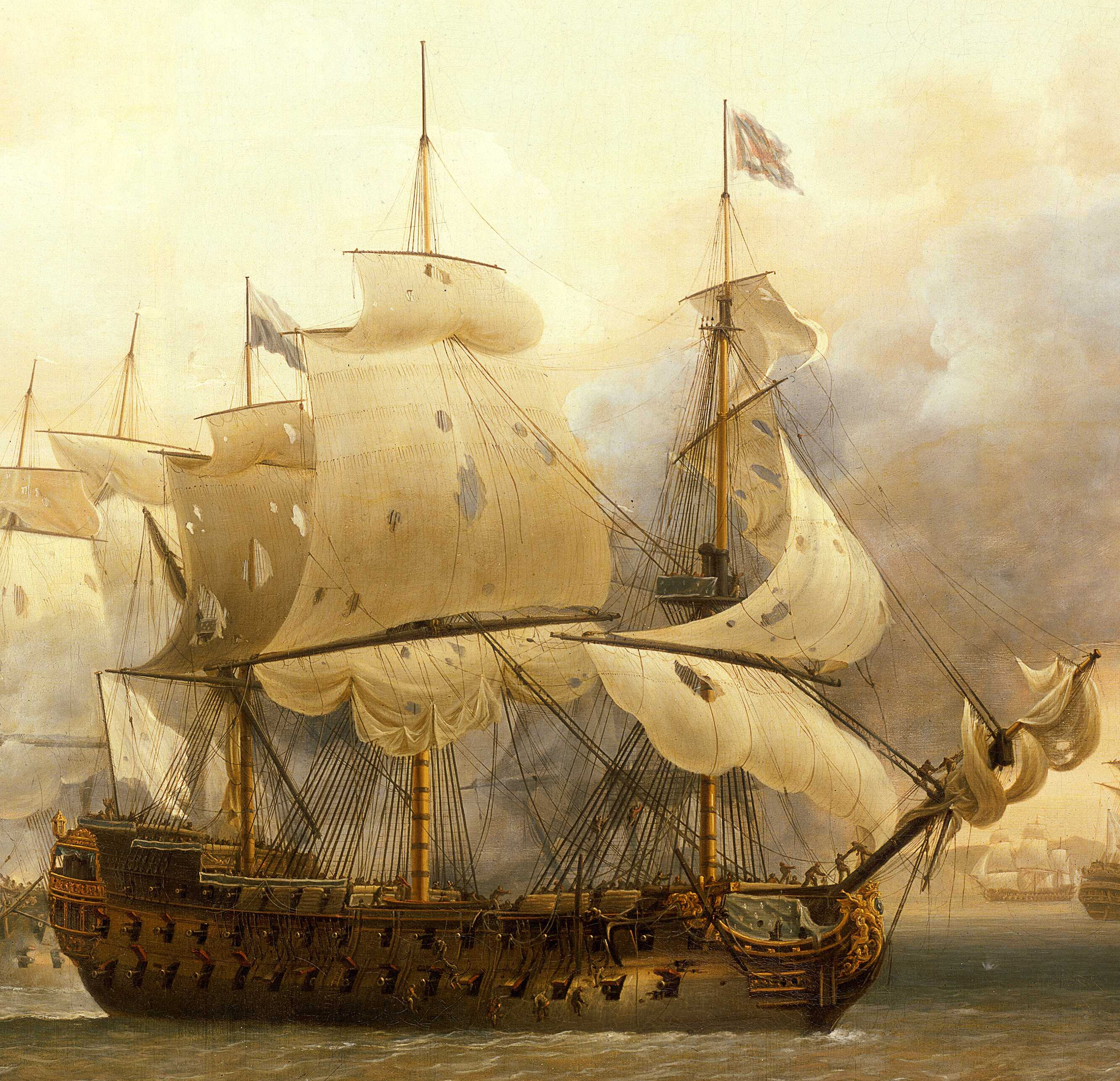
- Saint-Esprit at the Battle of Saint Kitts, 26 January 1782

History

France
- Name: Saint-Esprit
- Namesake: Order of the Holy Spirit
- Ordered: 11 January 1762
- Builder: Arsenal of Brest
- Laid down: May 1762
- Launched: 12 October 1765
- Christened: 20 January 1762
- Commissioned: 1766
- Decommissioned: 26 January 1795
- Renamed: Scipion in April 1794
- Fate: Wrecked off Brest on 26 January 1795

General characteristics
- Class & type: Saint-Esprit-class ship of the line
- Displacement: 3800 tonneaux
- Tons burthen: 2050 port tonneaux
- Length: 59.8 m (196 ft 2 in)
- Beam: 14.9 m (48 ft 11 in)
- Draught: 7.5 m (24 ft 7 in)
- Complement: 970
- Armament: 80 guns: 30 × 36-pounder long guns; 32 × 24-pounder long guns; 18 × 18-pounder long guns

Saint-Esprit was an 80-gun ship of the line of the French Navy. She was the lead ship of her class. Funded by a don des vaisseaux donation from the Order of the Holy Spirit, she was named in their honour.

== Career ==
She took part in the Battle of Ushant under La Motte-Picquet, and to the Armada of 1779.

In 1781, on 29 April, she took part in the Battle of Fort Royal under Chabert-Cogolin.

She was renamed Scipion in April 1794, and took part in the Bataille du 13 prairial an 2 under Huguet, where she was totally dismasted. She was wrecked on 30 January 1795, during the Croisière du Grand Hiver. Most of her crew were rescued by Trente-et-un Mai.

As a young man, Swedish naval officer Johan Herman Schützercrantz served on board the Saint–Esprit; he would later become a rear admiral in Swedish service.
