= Lantmäteriet =

Swedish government agency

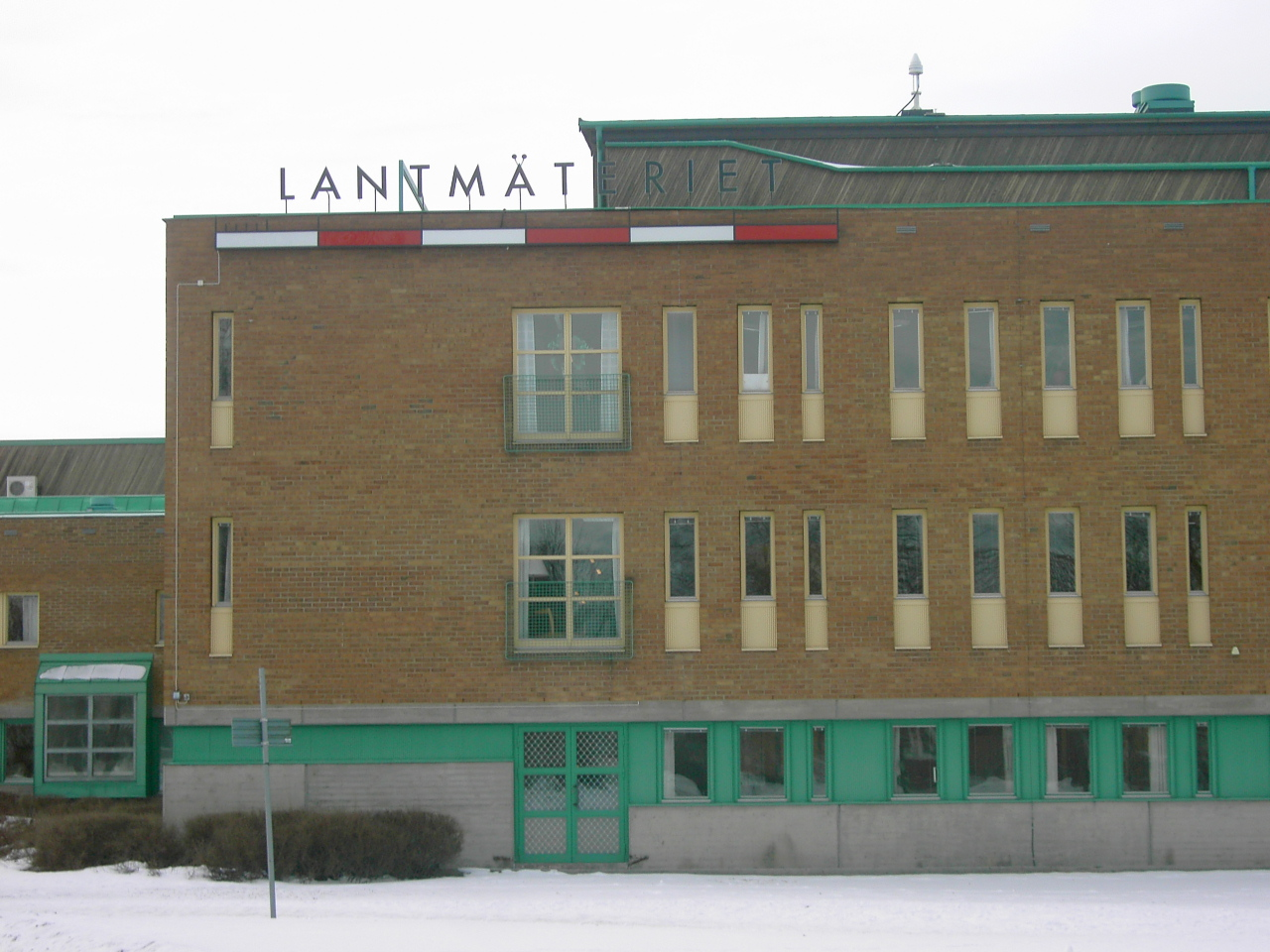
Lantmäteriets office in Gävle

Lantmäteriet is a government agency in Sweden acting as the national mapping, cadastral and land registration authority. It provides information on Swedish geography and property. Its main seat is in Gävle.

== About Lantmäteriet ==
Lantmäteriet maps the country, demarcates boundaries and helps guarantee secure ownership of Sweden’s real property. The organisation also provides Sweden’s geography and real properties information.

It also provide services for subdivisions or changes in land boundaries. The organisation handles applications for registered ownership and ensures that registration of ownership is done in the real property register.

== History ==
Lantmäteriet was founded in 1628, when Swedish general mathematician Anders Bure was tasked with systematically mapping out the Swedish Empire and educating new land surveyors under directions from the Swedish King Gustaf II Adolf. It was placed under the administrative authority Kammarkollegiet. Among the organisations first tasks was to create large-scale geometrical maps of the various towns, parishes and homesteads throughout the realm. This became especially important after the conquest of several provincial areas from the many wars the Swedish Empire participated in throughout the 17th century, such as the southern regions Skåne, Halland and Blekinge, in order to accumulate information on the regions. These were collected into geometrical cadastral registers (In Swedish; geometriska jordeböcker). The land surveyors were tasked not only with collecting and illustrating the characteristics of the Swedish landscape, but furthermore to also come up with suggestions for improvements, mainly within the agricultural sphere. Lantmäteriet was later responsible for executing the Swedish agricultural land reforms in the 18th- and 19th century, called the Great Partition (In Swedish; Storskiftet), Enskiftet and Laga skiftet. This shifted the focus of their general tasks towards mainly performing large-scaled geometric surveys.

The central office used to be situated in central Stockholm, with regional offices spread throughout the realm. The main seat was held there until the move to Gävle in 1975.

The National Swedish Land Survey Administration (Statens lantmäteriverk) was established on 1 July 1974 and was an amalgamation of the National [Swedish] Land Survey Board (Lantmäteristyrelsen, LMS) which had been active since 1628 and the Publications of the Geographical Survey Office of Sweden (Rikets allmänna kartverk, RAK) with predecessors that began to operate in the early 1800s. The National Swedish Land Survey Administration became the National Land Survey of Sweden (Lantmäteriverket) in 1996 due to the fact that the authority was co-organized with the Swedish Central Board for Real Property Data (Centralnämnden för fastighetsdata, CFD).

== Organisation in brief ==
Lantmäteriet has three divisions, each responsible for different business areas.

The Cadastral Services Division is responsible for property division: in other words, it makes decisions on new property units and making changes to existing boundaries. The division is also responsible for making decisions concerning joint properties, easements and rights of way.

The Land Registration Division examines, makes decisions on and registers title transactions, mortgages, site leasehold rights and other rights that are then recorded in the Real Property Register. The division also makes decisions on and handles stamp duty and charges.

The Geodata Division gathers, stores and updates information on Sweden’s geography and properties, and makes the information available to the public, the public sector and the private sector.
