= Härnösand Municipality =

Härnösand Municipality Härnösands kommun
- Municipality
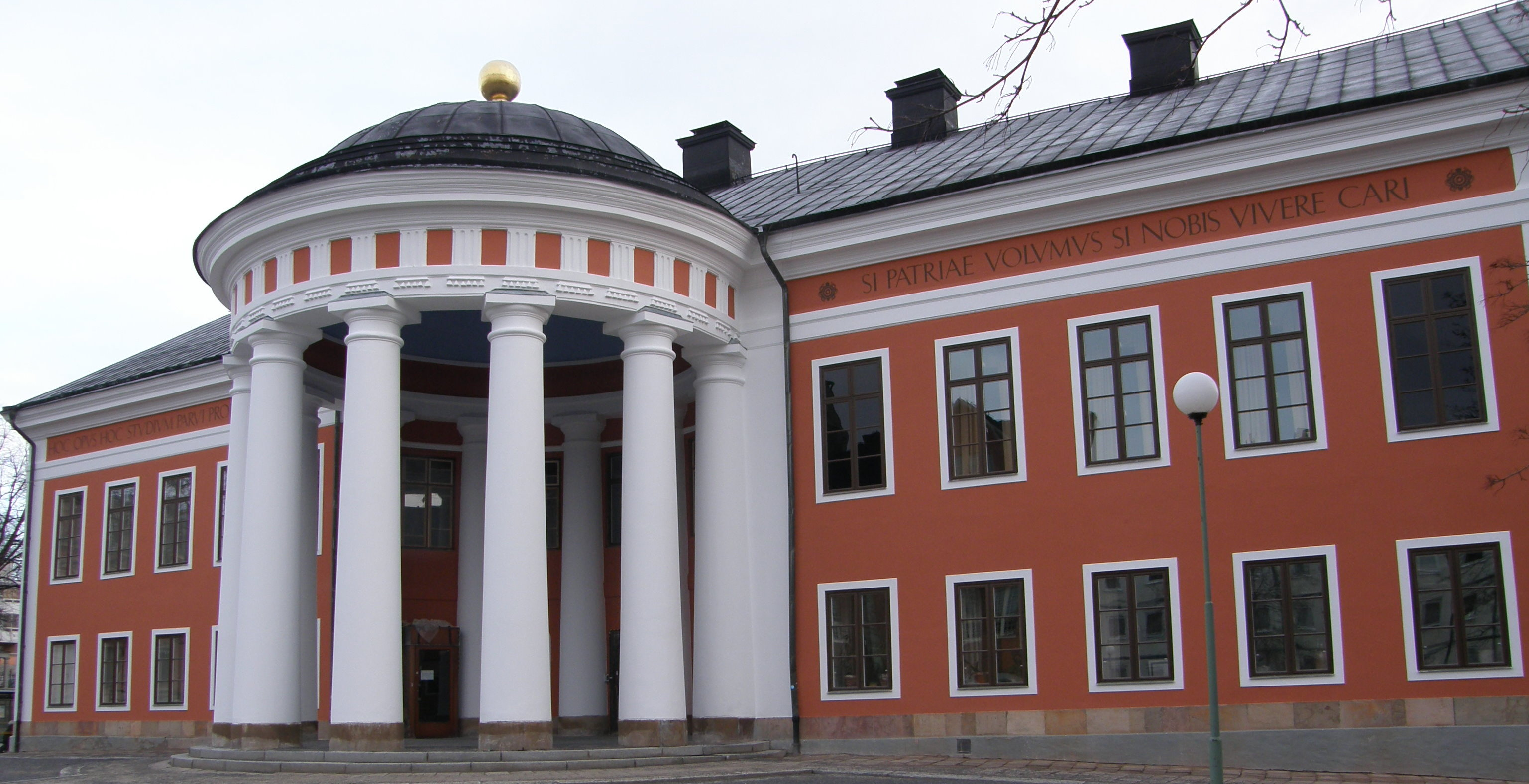
- Härnösands Town Hall

- Coat of arms

- Coordinates: 62°38′N 17°56′E
- Country: Sweden
- County: Västernorrland County
- Seat: Härnösand

Area
  - Total: 1,938.58 km^{2} (748.49 sq mi)
  - Land: 1,058.36 km^{2} (408.64 sq mi)
  - Water: 880.22 km^{2} (339.85 sq mi)
- Area as of 1 January 2014.

Population (30 June 2025)
  - Total: 24,502
  - Density: 23.151/km^{2} (59.961/sq mi)
- Time zone: UTC+1 (CET)
  - Summer (DST): UTC+2 (CEST)
- ISO 3166 code: SE
- Province: Ångermanland
- Municipal code: 2280

Härnösand Municipality (Swedish: Härnösands kommun) is a municipality in Västernorrland County, northern Sweden. Its seat is located in Härnösand (pop. 18,000).

The present municipality was formed in 1969 through the amalgamation of the City of Härnösand with Säbrå (itself created in 1952 when five former entities were merged) and Högsjö.

Its coat of arms depict a beaver with a pike in its mouth.

== Villages ==
- Härnösand (seat)
- Ramvik
- Utansjö
- Älandsbro
- Ramsås
- Säbrå

== Demographics ==
This is a demographic table based on Härnösand Municipality's electoral districts in the 2022 Swedish general election sourced from SVT's election platform, in turn taken from SCB official statistics.

Residents include everyone registered as living in the district, regardless of age or citizenship status. Valid voters indicate Swedish citizens above the age of 18 who therefore can vote in general elections. Left vote and right vote indicate the result between the two major blocs in said district in the 2022 general election. Employment indicates the share of people between the ages of 20 and 64 who are working taxpayers. Foreign background is defined as residents either born abroad or with two parents born outside of Sweden. Median income is the received monthly income through either employment, capital gains or social grants for the median adult above 20, also including pensioners in Swedish kronor. The section about college graduates indicates any degree accumulated after high school.

In total there were 24,977 inhabitants, including 19,103 Swedish citizens of voting age. 59.6% voted for the left coalition and 39.2% for the right coalition.Indicators are in percentage points except population totals and income.

| Location | Residents | Citizen adults | Left vote | Right vote | Employed | Swedish parents | Foreign heritage | Income SEK | Degree |
| Location | | | % | % | | | | | |
|---|---|---|---|---|---|---|---|---|---|
| Bondsjö-Säbrå | 1,793 | 1,358 | 55.3 | 43.9 | 86 | 92 | 8 | 27,685 | 41 |
| Brunne-Viksjö | 1,295 | 1,079 | 50.2 | 48.4 | 81 | 92 | 8 | 23,395 | 35 |
| Brännan | 1,597 | 1,285 | 67.8 | 31.3 | 85 | 89 | 11 | 26,438 | 52 |
| Centrum | 1,803 | 1,507 | 68.3 | 30.5 | 71 | 81 | 19 | 21,793 | 44 |
| Geresta-Gånsvik | 2,537 | 1,839 | 61.3 | 37.5 | 82 | 82 | 18 | 27,758 | 50 |
| Häggdånger | 563 | 447 | 59.4 | 39.1 | 85 | 94 | 6 | 25,714 | 44 |
| Hälletorp-Framnäs | 1,813 | 1,266 | 59.8 | 39.1 | 76 | 75 | 25 | 23,332 | 34 |
| Högsjö | 1,420 | 1,110 | 55.8 | 41.6 | 75 | 88 | 12 | 21,148 | 24 |
| Kullen-Haga | 2,163 | 1,748 | 56.9 | 42.3 | 79 | 86 | 14 | 24,261 | 39 |
| Landgren | 2,256 | 1,734 | 62.3 | 36.7 | 73 | 72 | 28 | 21,841 | 41 |
| Norra Härnön | 1,796 | 1,362 | 67.7 | 31.6 | 81 | 86 | 14 | 27,298 | 54 |
| Rotudden-Gådeåstaden | 1,747 | 1,280 | 59.0 | 39.4 | 65 | 67 | 33 | 18,882 | 32 |
| Älandsbro | 2,170 | 1,701 | 49.2 | 49.7 | 83 | 93 | 7 | 24,838 | 31 |
| Änget-Murberget | 2,024 | 1,387 | 63.0 | 35.3 | 70 | 67 | 33 | 19,722 | 36 |
Source: SVT
