= Jean-Baptiste Philibert Willaumez =

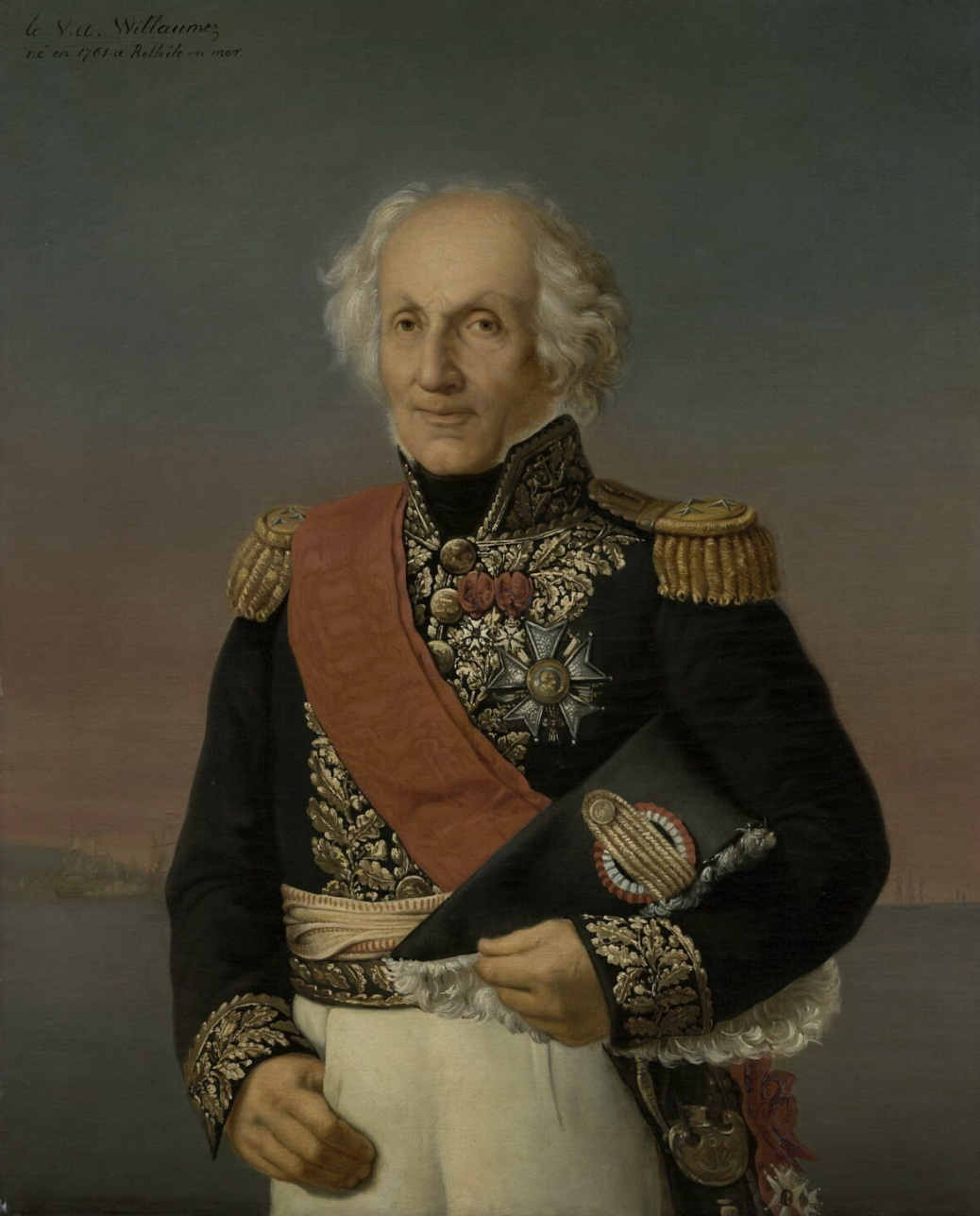
- Portrait by Pierre-Louis Delaval
- Born: 7 August 1763; Le Palais, Belle Île
- Died: 17 May 1845 (aged 81); Suresnes, Île-de-France
- Relatives: Étienne-Joseph Willaumez (brother)
- Military career
- Allegiance: Kingdom of France; French First Republic; First French Empire
- Branch: French Navy; French Imperial Navy
- Rank: Vice admiral
- Conflicts: French Revolutionary Wars; Battle of Île Ronde; Action of 28 June 1803; Napoleonic Wars; Atlantic campaign of 1806; Battle of the Basque Roads

Vice-Admiral Jean-Baptiste Philibert Willaumez (7 August 1763 – 17 May 1845) was a French Navy officer who served in the French Revolutionary and Napoleonic Wars. Willaumez joined the French navy at the age of 14, and proved to be a competent sailor. Having risen to the rank of pilot, he started studying navigation, attracting the attention of his superiors and Louis XVI. Willaumez eventually became an officer and served under Antoine Bruni d'Entrecasteaux in his expedition to find the comte de Lapérouse and explore the Indian Ocean and Oceania.

During the French Revolutionary Wars, Willaumez rose in rank and served in Saint-Domingue during the Haitian Revolution, where he commanded the frigate Poursuivante against the Royal Navy during the action of 28 June 1803. In 1806, Willaumez led a French squadron in the Atlantic campaign of 1806, sailing to Brazil and the West Indies and attacking British merchant shipping. However, Jérôme Bonaparte's insubordination led to Willaumez missing the chance to attack a valuable British convoy. Eventually, the 1806 Great Coastal hurricane damaged and dispersed his squadron, which was either sunk or limped back to France.

In May 1808, Willaumez attempted to regroup warships scattered in Brest, Lorient and Rochefort into an eighteen-ship squadron to defend the French West Indies; adverse weather and the poor state of the squadron thwarted the plan and he ended up being blockaded by the British in Rochefort, leading to a catastrophic defeat at the Battle of the Basque Roads and Willaumez falling out of favour with Napoleon. After the end of the Napoleonic Wars Willaumez served at the Council of Naval Constructions and was granted a peerage. He authored a dictionary of naval terms, sponsored a collection of ship models and commissioned the Roux family to paint portraits of all the ships on which he had served, a collection known as the Album de Willaumez.

== Career ==
=== Early life ===
Willaumez was born to an infantry captain who died without fortune at the age of 68, leaving six orphan children. Jean-Baptiste being the older, he took upon himself to teach his younger brothers, all of whom would die in the service of the French Navy.

In 1777, at the age of 14, he enlisted as an apprentice pilot boy on the 74-gun Bien-Aimé, under Captain de Bougainville, in the squadron under Admiral du Chaffault. The year after, he was appointed to the 56-gun Flamand, bound for Mauritius, as an apprentice helmsman. Upon his arrival, he transferred to the coastal schooner Fourmi. When Fourmi was condemned, (Note: Roche (p.213) states that Fourmi was captured by a British privateer in 1797.) he transferred to the Louise, on which he was wrecked on the reef off Tamarin. (Note: Roche (p.286) states that Louise served as a fluyt at Rochefort from 1778 and was condemned in 1783. Possibly a different ship.) Willaumez eventually returned to France on the corvette Les Amis.

Portraits of relevants ships, by François Roux
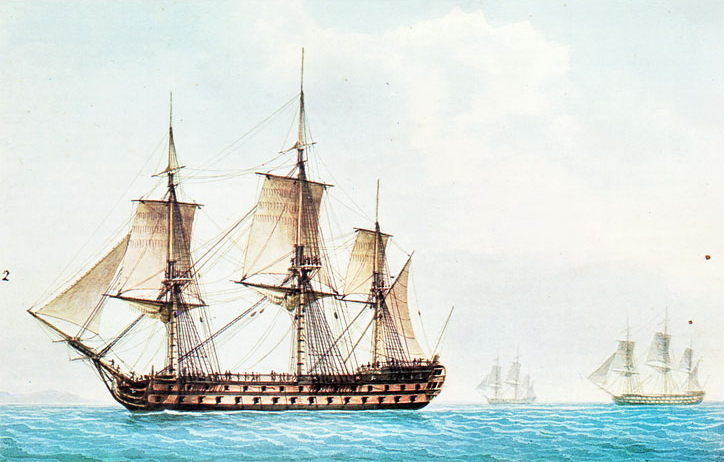
74-gun Bien-Aimé

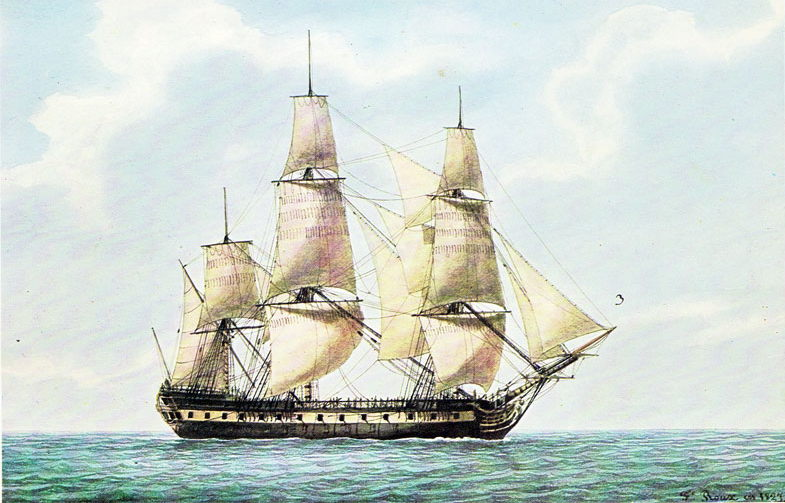
56-gun Flamand

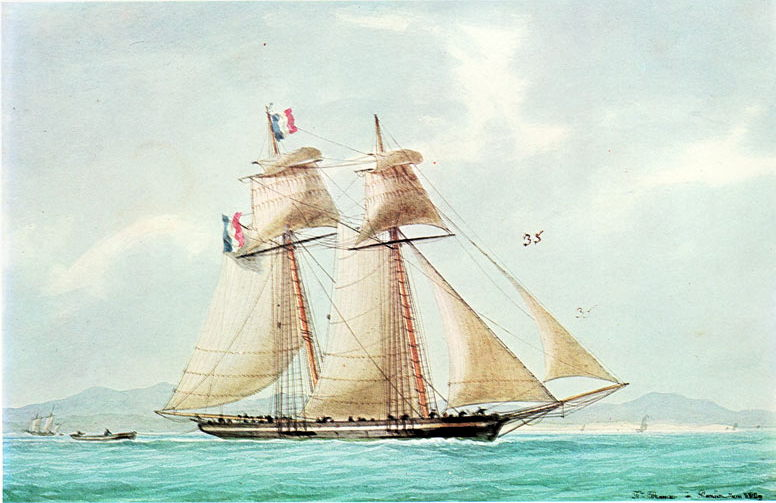
coastal schooner Fourmi

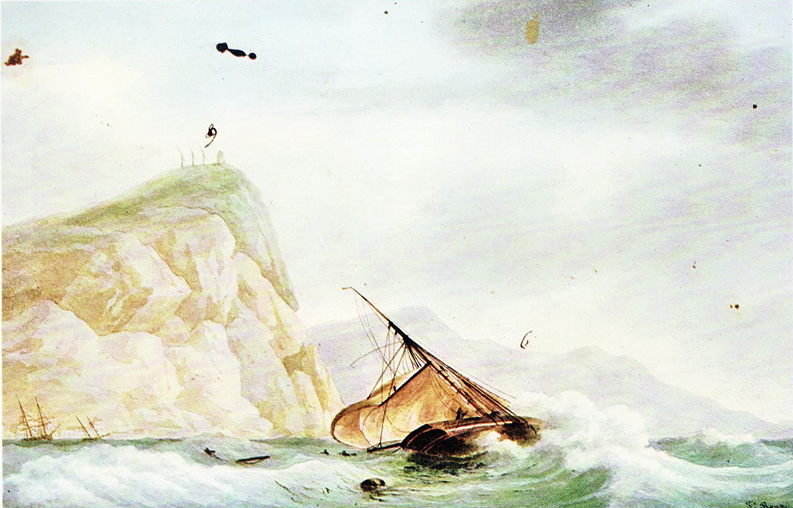
fluyt Louise

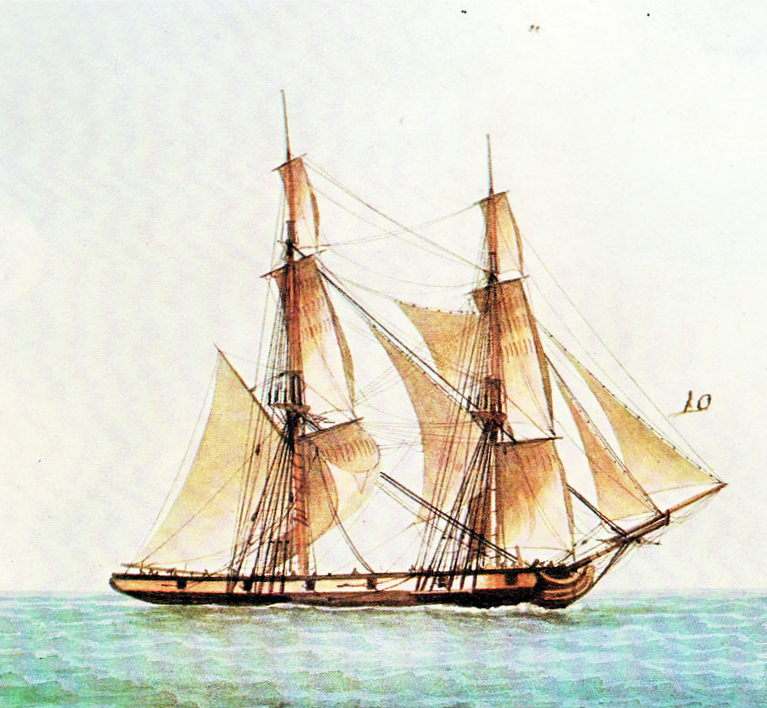
aviso Les Amis

=== Service on Amazone ===
Arrived at Lorient, and finding no ship in need for his services, Willaumez went to Brest, where he was quickly enlisted as aid-pilot on the 90-gun Ville de Paris, which in late 1780 was being overhauled. Weary of his inactivity during the work on Ville de Paris, Willaumez requested a transfer on a departing ship, and was appointed as a pilot to the frigate Amazone, under La Pérouse, in January 1781.

Cruising in the Bay of Biscay, Amazone captured the twelve-gun privateer lugger Pitt; Willaumez was given command of a prize crew and sailed her to Lorient. He then rejoined Amazone, which was escorting a convoy to America.

Upon her arrival, Amazone was attached to the fleet of Admiral de Grasse, and took part in the Battle of the Saintes in April 1782. On 29 July, while sailing at the entrance of Chesapeake Bay, Amazone, then under Lieutenant de Moniguyot, met the British frigate HMS Santa Margarita; in the ensuing battle, Amazon lost her main mast, her foremast, struck her colours with half her crew dead or wounded. On the next day, the French squadron under Vaudreuil appeared and recaptured Amazon. Having stayed alone on the quarterdeck of Amazon, and twice seriously wounded, Willaumez was praised by the Admiral and promoted to first pilot.

Portraits of relevants ships, by François Roux
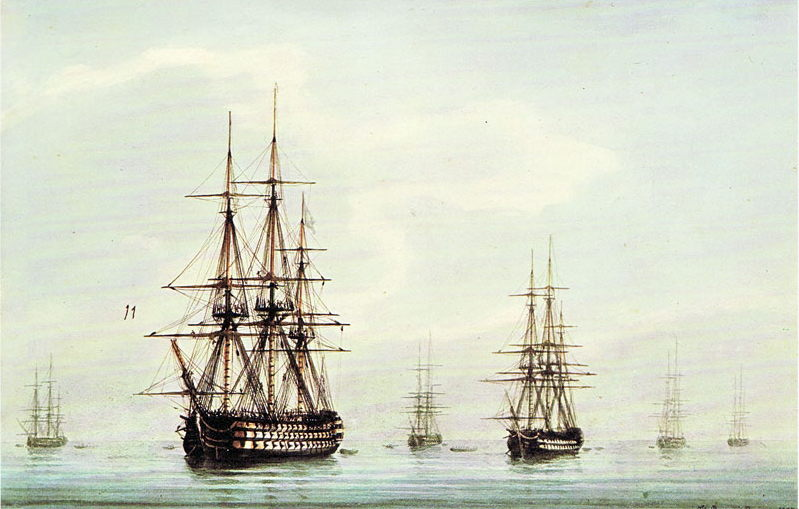
90-gun Ville de Paris

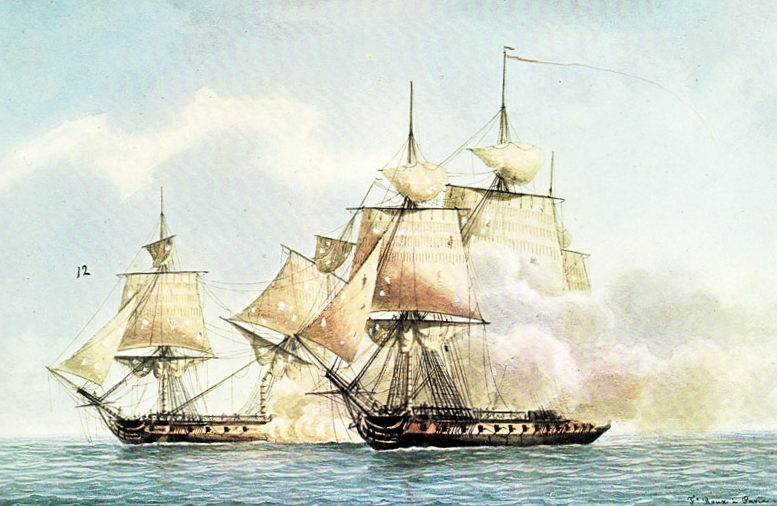
Amazone in battle against HMS Santa Margarita

=== Service on Astrée ===
In 1784, returned to France, Willaumez enlisted as first officer on the 700-ton merchantman Tharon, on which he made two trips to Saint Domingue. On the second time, he saved his ship, which was in danger of being wrecked at the entrance of the Loire. The year after, he returned to the French Royal Navy and embarked as first pilot on the aviso Sylphe; there again, he saved his ship when she sprang a leak after sailing off harbour, and sailed her to Rochefort.

In Rochefort, Willaumez transferred on the fluyt Lionne, which sailed to the Caribbean. In 1786, he enlisted on the Forte, and transferred on the frigate Astrée, bound for the Indies.

In this period, Willaumez took upon himself to study navigation and astronomy, for which he displayed such passion that the chief of the station, Saint-Riveuil, offered him a sextant and a chronometer. Willaumez also received a Reflecting circle from Louis XVI inscribed "Donné par le roi à M. Willaumez, premier pilote".

Astrée was called back to France, ferrying Antoine Bruni d'Entrecasteaux, governor of Mauritius. When, upon his arrival, Entrecasteaux was appointed to command the Patriote, he took Willaumez with him.

Portraits of relevants ships, by François Roux
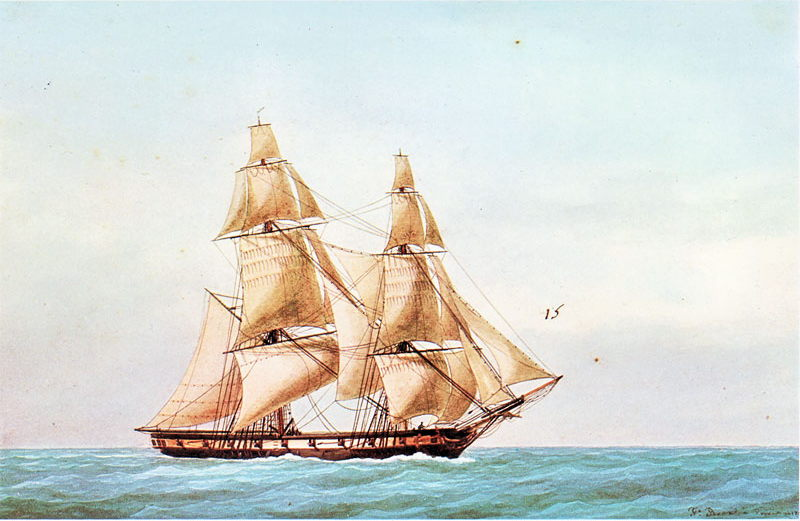
aviso Sylphe

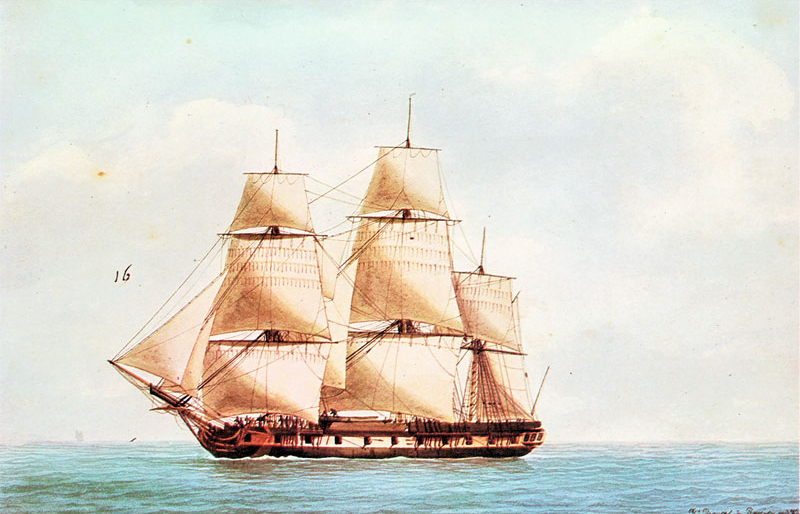
fluyt Lionne

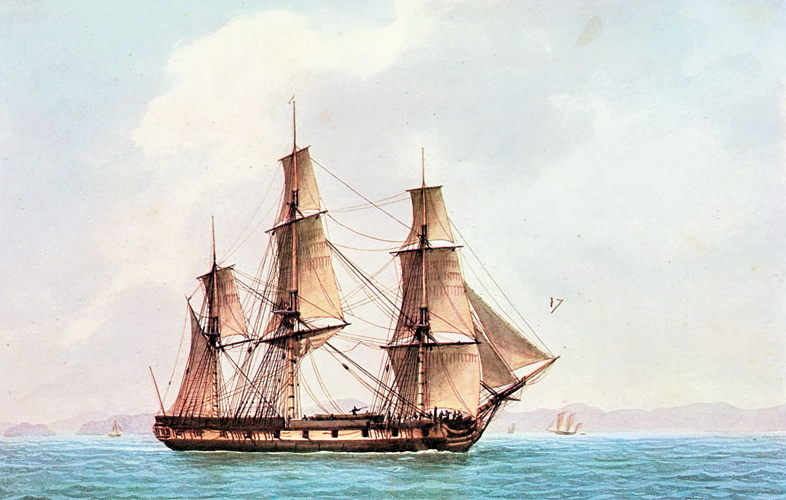
fluyt Forte

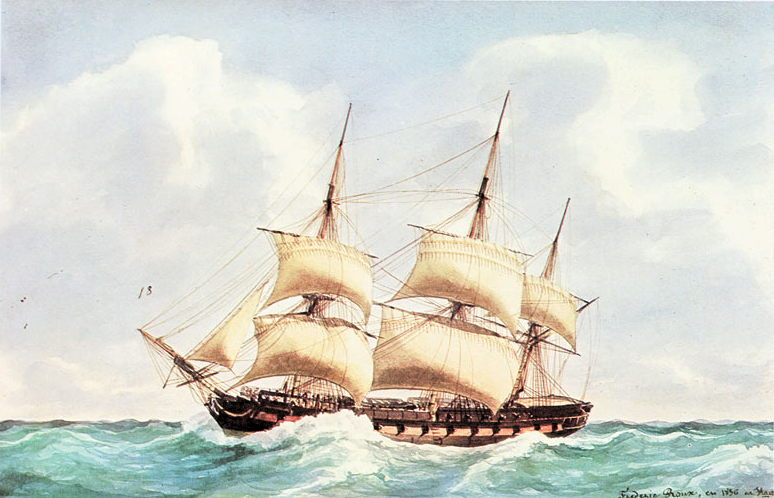
frigate Astrée

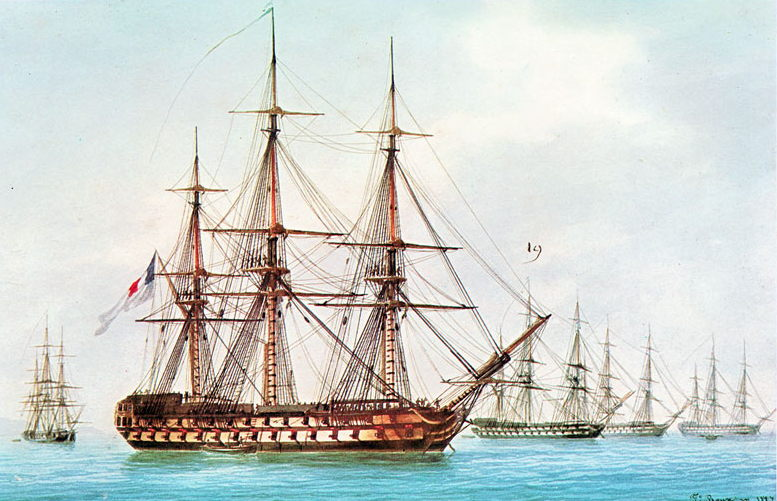
Patriote

=== Service on Recherche in D'Entrecasteaux' expedition ===
When D'Entrecasteaux was tasked to investigate the fate of Lapérouse's expedition and given command of the Recherche, Willaumez, promoted to Ensign in 1791, followed him, and was tasked with navigation and chronometers. During the campaign, D'Entrecasteaux promoted him to Lieutenant, and appointed Knight of the Order of Saint Louis. In the course of the exploration, he also named the Willaumez Peninsula after him.

D'Entrecasteaux died of scurvy on 21 July 1793 and his ships sailed to Java, where they were interned by the Dutch, who were then at war with France. Willaumez was detained for some time before he was able to sail to Mauritius, where he enlisted on the frigate Prudente, under Jean-Marie Renaud. On Prudente, he took part in the Battle of Île Ronde, where he commanded the battery of the frigate and received a hand wound. In recognition of his conduct, the governor of Mauritius granted Willaumez command of the corvette Légère and tasked him to carry the documents of D'Entrecasteaux' expedition to France. Légère anchored in Brest two months later.

Portraits of relevants ships, by François Roux
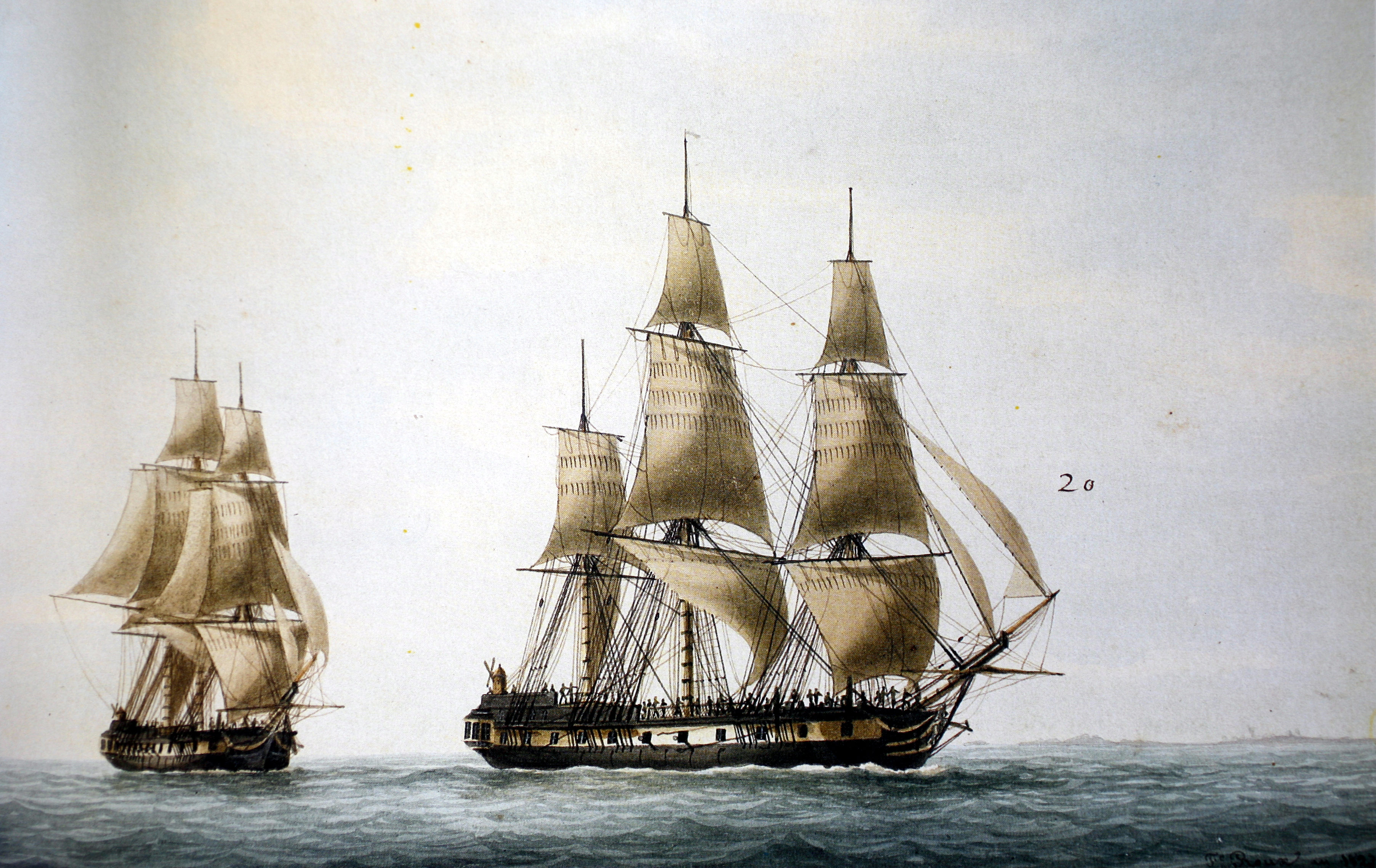
The frigates Recherche and Espérance

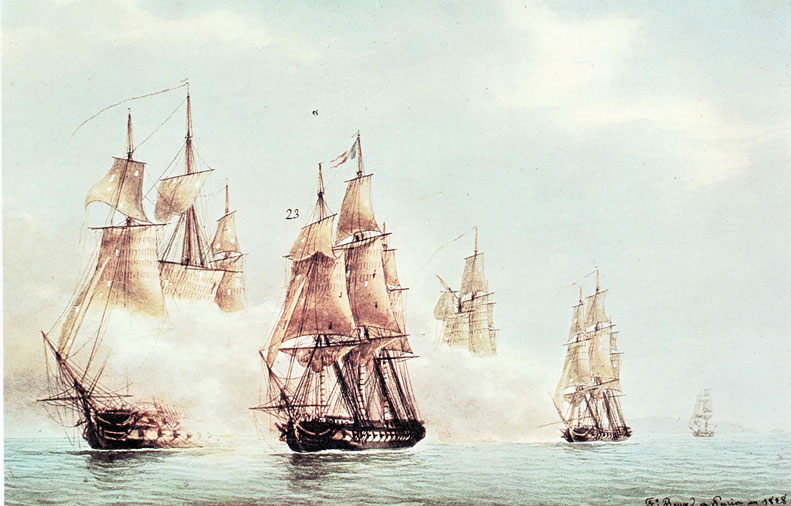
frigate Prudente

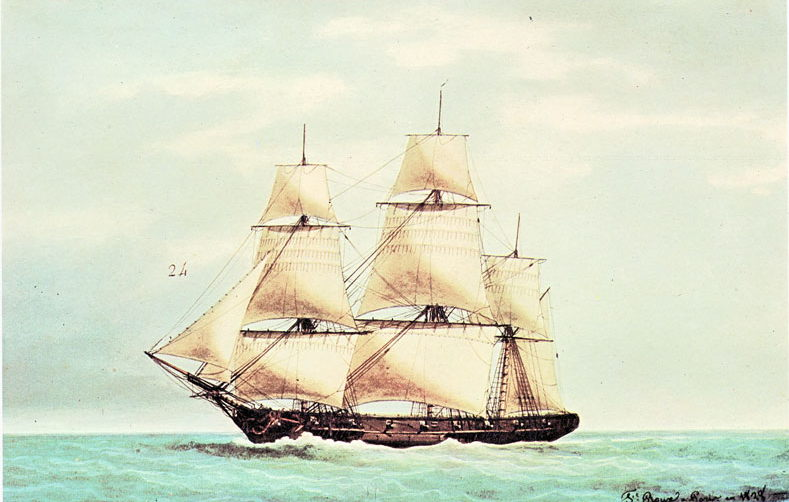
corvette Légère

=== Command of Régénérée in Sercey's squadron ===
In March 1795, Willaumez was promoted to captain; in May, he was appointed to arm the 74-gun Pluton, on which he perfected techniques of rigging and cargo arrangement. He then ferried the corvette Bergère from Brest to Rochefort, in spite of the British blockade, and took command of the 40-gun frigate Régénérée.

Régénérée was part of a two-corvette and four-frigate naval division under Counter-Admiral Sercey, tasked to sail to Mauritius and prey on British merchantmen in the Indian Ocean. During the campaign, she captured nineteen of the 23 prizes captured by the squadron and took part in the action of 8 September 1796, where she suffered two killed and six wounded.

With dwindling support from the colony of Mauritius, Sercey had to send Régénérée and Vertu, under Captain Magon, back to France. The frigates departed the Indian Ocean theatre in September sailing from Mauritius to Rochefort and escorting two merchantmen of the Spanish Royal Company of the Philippines to Europe.

En route, the two frigates and two merchantmen stopped at Îles de Los to effect repair and gather water; they anchored at Tamara, Vertu disassembling her masts and yards to restore her rigging, while Régénérée sailed to the nearby island of Factori. On 24 April, the 32-gun HMS Pearl, under Captain James Ballard, attacked Vertu; one hour into the battle, Régénérée, attracted by the cannonade, intervened and forced Pearl to flee. Régénérée chased Pearl for 36 hours before abandoning the pursuit.

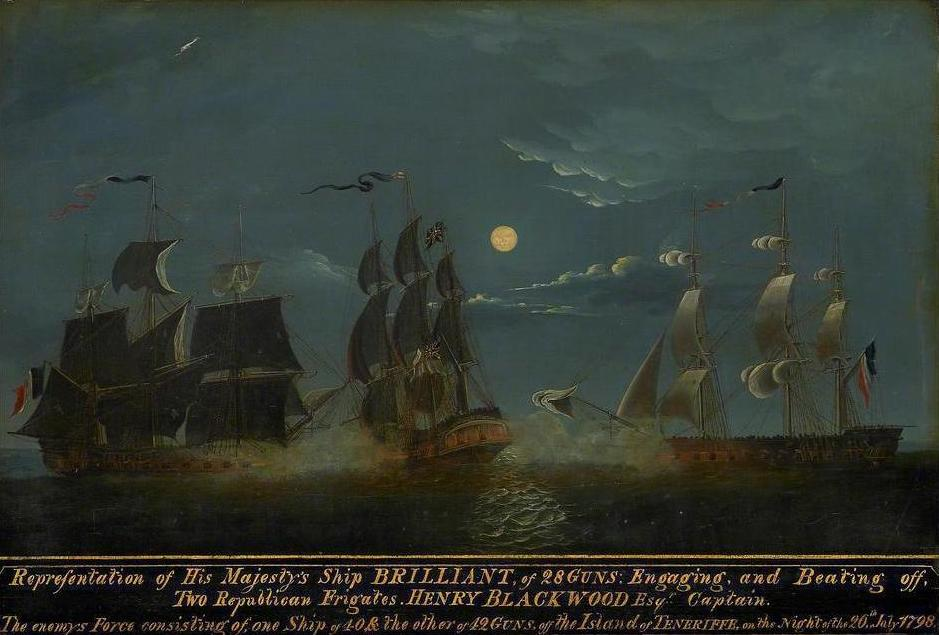
Chase between HMS Brilliant and Vertu and Régénérée.

On 10 May 1798, the ships departed for Europe. Arrived at Tenerife, the merchantmen were put under the care of the governor, as they considerably retarded the travel of the frigates. On 27 July, as the frigates prepared to pursue their journey, they were observed by the 28-gun HMS Brilliant, under Henry Blackwood. At 6, the French frigates put to sail and started firing on Brilliant; Régénérée was closing in to her opponent when Vertu, which had sailed large, touched the wind; Régénérée imitated her manoeuver, but lost her mizzen and bowsprit, allowing Brilliant to flee. Vertu gave chase, but could not overhaul her opponent and returned to Tenerife. There, Régénérée replaced her rigging, and both frigates eventually arrived in Rochefort on 5 September.

Portraits of relevants ships, by François Roux
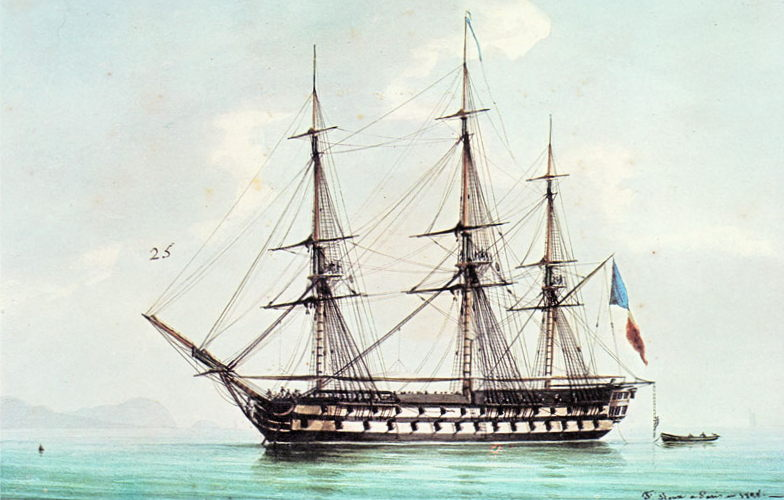
74-gun Pluton

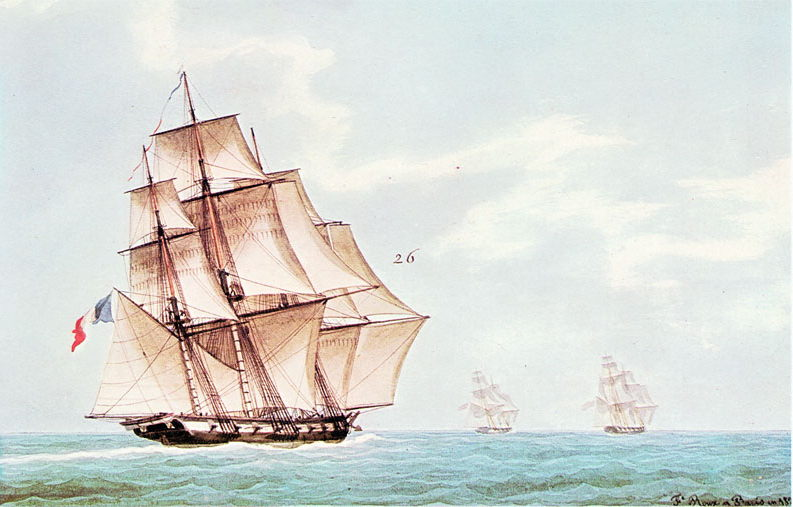
corvette Bergère

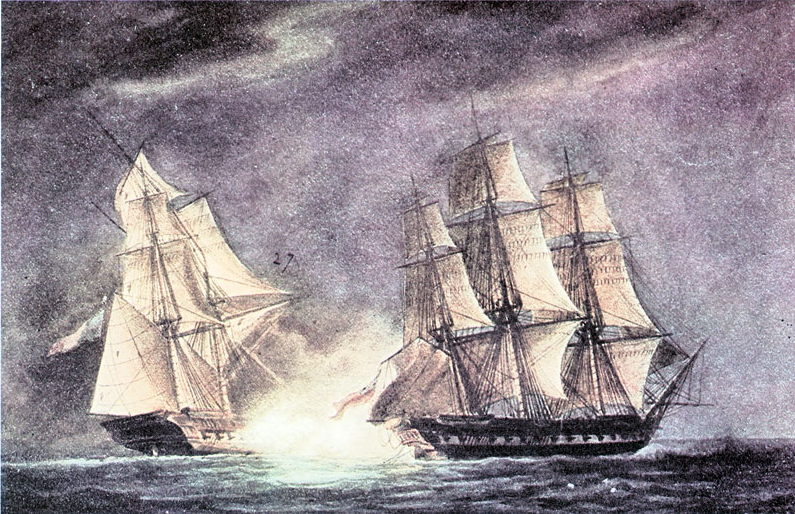
frigate Régénérée in battle against HMS Pearl

=== Service in Saint-Domingue on Poursuivante ===
Promoted to Chef de Division in January 1799, Willaumez was ordered to Saint-Malo to lead a campaign of his own design with a three-frigate and one-corvette division. However, the expedition could not depart and Willaumez returned to Paris, where, along with Fleurieu, he documented D'Entrecasteaux' expedition.

In 1801, at the Peace of Amiens, Willaumez was appointed to command the 74-gun Duguay-Trouin, part of a squadron under Counter-Admiral Latouche-Tréville in Villaret de Joyeuse's fleet bound for Saint-Domingue; the squadron counted six ships of the line, six frigates and two corvettes, and was to ferry 3000 soldiers.

Willaumez was given command of the Southern station of Saint-Domingue, and although he had no troops at his disposal there, he managed to maintain order. He also gained the trust of the black population, to the extent that General Laplume entrusted him two millions francs to carry to Port-au-Prince. In November 1802, after Donatien de Rochambeau replaced the deceased Charles Leclerc as commander-in-chief of all French forces in Saint-Domingue, he began ordering Blacks to be executed by drowning. Rochambeau had the entire garrison of Fort Dauphin, all of whom were Black soldiers, transferred to Swiftsure and thrown overboard by her crew. Rochambeau then ordered all French warships to carry out such executions; only Willaumez refused, stating that "The officers of the French Navy are not executioners. I will not obey!" (Note: Les officiers de la Marine française ne sont pas des bourreaux. Je n'obéirai pas!)

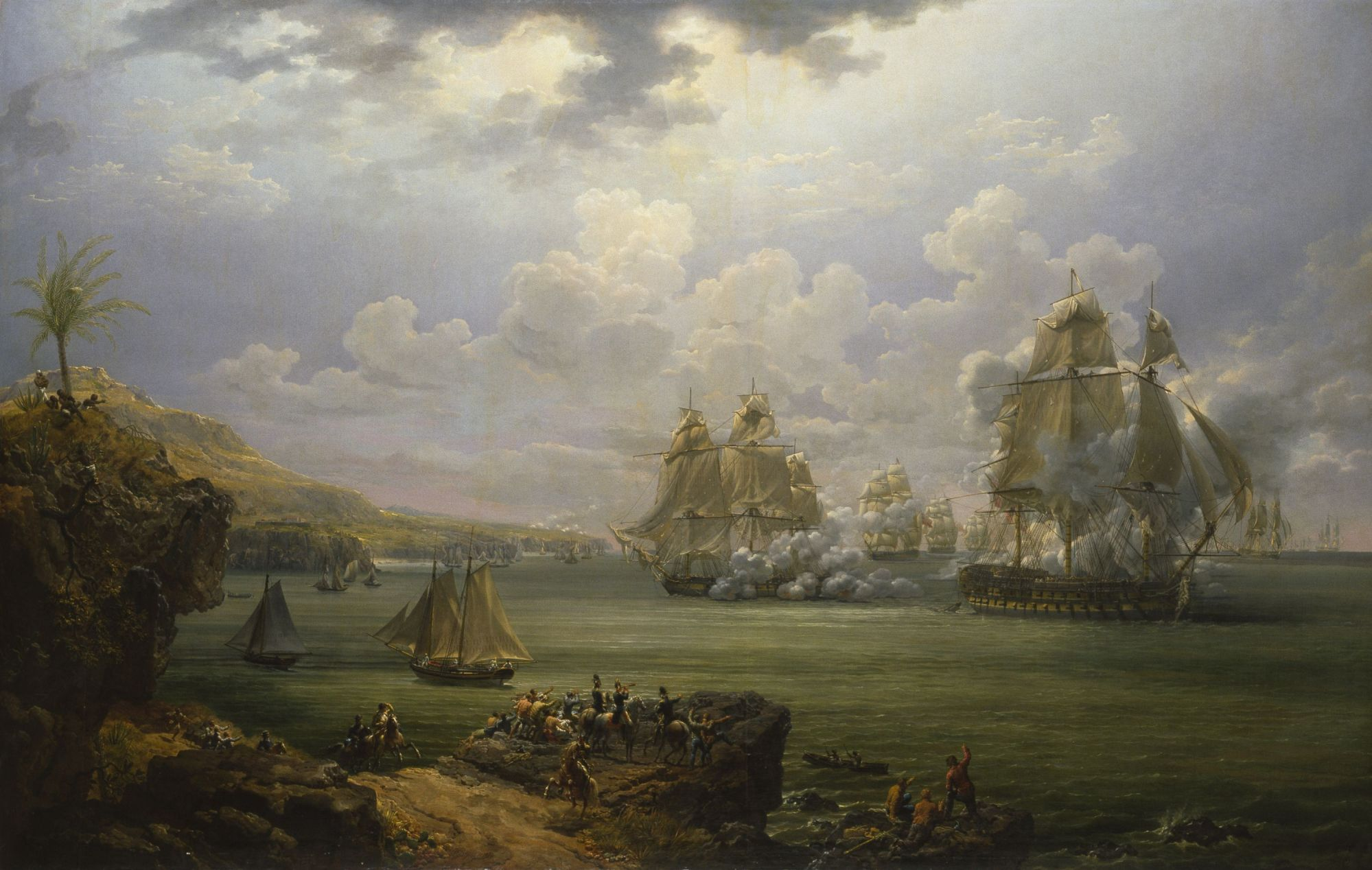
Fight of the Poursuivante against HMS Hercules, by Louis-Philippe Crépin.

After 18 months, Willaumez transferred his flag on the frigate Poursuivante, on which he served successively at the Western and Southern stations, and carried out a number of raids against the rebel Indigenous Army. On 27 June 1803, Poursuivante departed Les Cayes, bound for Cap‑Français, in the company of the sixteen-gun corvette Mignonne, under Jean Pierre Bargeau.

In the early morning of 28 June 1803, Poursuivante spotted a large convoy of about fifty ships, with three ships of the line for escort; they were the 74-gun HMS Hercules, Cumberland and Goliath, which detached and set a course to intercept. At eight, the 74-gun HMS Hercules came in range, hoisted the British flag, prompting Poursuivante to hoist the French colours, and opened fire at nine.

After two hours of mutual cannonade, the ships were close to shore and at eleven, the wind fell, favouring the shallower and more manoeuvrable frigate, which quickly came in position to rake Hercule and delivered a devastating broadside at her stern. Hercule, in order to avoid running aground, disengaged, allowing Poursuivante to reach the safety of Môle-Saint-Nicolas.

Goliath captured Mignonne after a brief chase and the exchange of a few token shots. Poursuivante had ten men killed and fifteen wounded. Her hull had sustained several shots and her rigging was much damaged. As Cap‑Français lacked the resources to repair the frigate, Willaumez was authorised to sail her back to France. He then left harbour and sailed around the South of Cuba. A few days later, he spotted a British privateer, which he captured and had to scuttle by fire because his lack of food did not allow him to sail her to Charlestown.

A gust of wind having dismasted Poursuivante, Willaumez was forced to make a port call in Baltimore and overhaul his frigate. When ready, he departed the Chesapeake, avoided the British blockade and crossed the Atlantic, reaching Rochefort on 28 May 1804. There, he was intercepted by a British ship of the line, which he battled for thirty minutes before breaking off and finding shelter at Île-d'Aix.

Willaumez had been made a Knight of the Order of the Legion of Honour in February. He was promoted to Officer in June, and congratulated by Navy minister Decrès.

Portraits of relevants ships, by François Roux
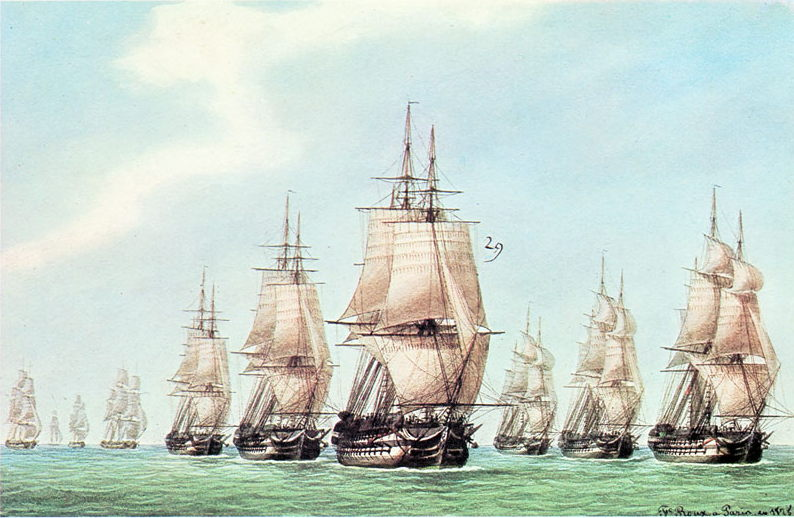
74-gun Duguay-Trouin

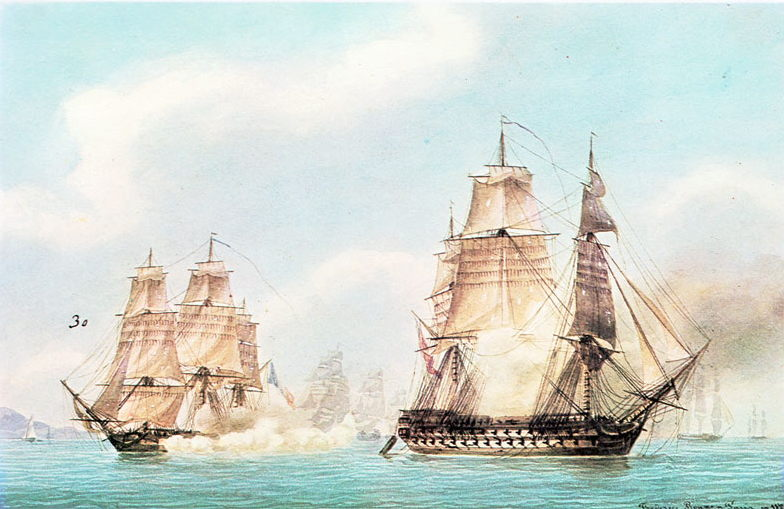
frigate Poursuivante

=== Willaumez' raid in the Atlantic ===
In August 1804, Willaumez was appointed to command the 74-gun Algésiras. Departing from Lorient in December bound for Rochefort, Algésiras suffered a gust of wind that broke her tops. Willaumez nevertheless pursued and safely reached Rochefort, despite a British division blockading Quiberon and another anchored at Basque Roads.

In March 1805, Willaumez had been promoted to counter admiral, and he took command of the light squadron of the Naval Army in Brest, under Vice-Admiral Ganteaume. Willaumez set is flag on the 74-gun Alexandre. During one sortie of the French fleet, Alexandre had a duel with the 110-gun HMS Hibernia.

In late 1805, eleven ships were readied to set sail in two squadrons, one under Counter-Admiral Leissègues, and the other under Willaumez; the squadrons departed on 13 December and separated on 15. Willaumez' comprised the 80-gun flagship Foudroyant, the 74-gun Vétéran, Cassard, Impétueux, Éole and Patriote, and the 40-gun frigates Valeureuse and Volontaire. Its mission was to sail to the Cape of Good Hope, replenish its water and provisions, harass British interests wherever opportune, and return no later than 15 months after.

In the first days of the cruise, the division captured a number of prizes, before making a two-day port call at the Canary Islands to replenish its food. Willaumez detached Volontaire to ferry his prisoners to Santa Cruz de Tenerife.

Arrived at the Cape of Good Hope, Willaumez learnt from the captain of a captured ship that Cape Town had been seized by the British in the Battle of Blaauwberg, in January 1806. With food supplies now unavailable and many of his men suffering from scurvy, Willaumez set sail for Brazil, where he arrived in early April 1806.

After a 17-day port call in São Salvador da Bahia, Willaumez set sail for Cayenne. There, he divided his squadron into three divisions, which he dispersed from Cayenne to the 9th parallel south; however, this tactic yielded disappointing results, and Willaumez regrouped his ships. He then decided to raid Barbados, and adverse winds and storms forced him to renounce and shelter in Martinique, where he arrived on 20 June. He replenished his water and food, and raided Montserrat. On 3 July his squadron captured a British schooner that the French took into service as Villaret.

Three days later, on 6 July, off Saint Thomas, Willaumez spotted a British squadron comprising five ships of the line and seven frigates and corvettes, which sailed away with the advantage of the wind. He was then informed of the arrival of a squadron under Admiral John Borlase Warren, and another under Admiral Richard Strachan; without marines to attack the British West Indies and reckoning that no convoy would depart for Europe as long as he would be known to lurk in the area, Willaumez decided to position his forces to intercept the convoy from Jamaica.

However, in the night of 1 August, the 74-gun Vétéran, under Prince Jérôme Bonaparte, disappeared. Willaumez fruitlessly searched the missing ship in several directions until he became certain that she was en route for France, and returned to his station; the convoy, however, had already passed.

Willaumez lingered a while in the hope that the convoy might still be yet to come, but in the night of 19 to 20 August, his fleet sustained a hurricane that damaged most of the ships. Foudroyant, having lost both her rudder and her masts, managed to limp back to Havana on jury rigging, but was intercepted and attacked by HMS Anson; as she had retained her full firepower, Foudroyant drove her opponent away within half an hour despite her lack of manoeuvrability, and entered harbour.

After a four-month stay in Havana, Willaumez departed for Chesapeake Bay to rejoin Patriote, Éole and Valeureuse, which had taken refuge there after the hurricane. Adverse weather prevented him, and Willaumez instead sailed back to France, arriving in Brest in February 1807. The division had returned dispersed and lost several ships: Impétueux had managed to build a jury rudder, but had been intercepted by a British squadron and forced to beach herself to avoid capture; Éole and Valeureuse had been sold for scrap in Annapolis; Vétéran had found an unlikely shelter in Concarneau, normally far too shallow to harbour a ship of the line, where she was blockaded; Patriote later reached Brest, and Cassard, Lorient. The damage to British shipping was evaluated to 12 to 15 million francs.

Portraits of relevants ships, by François Roux
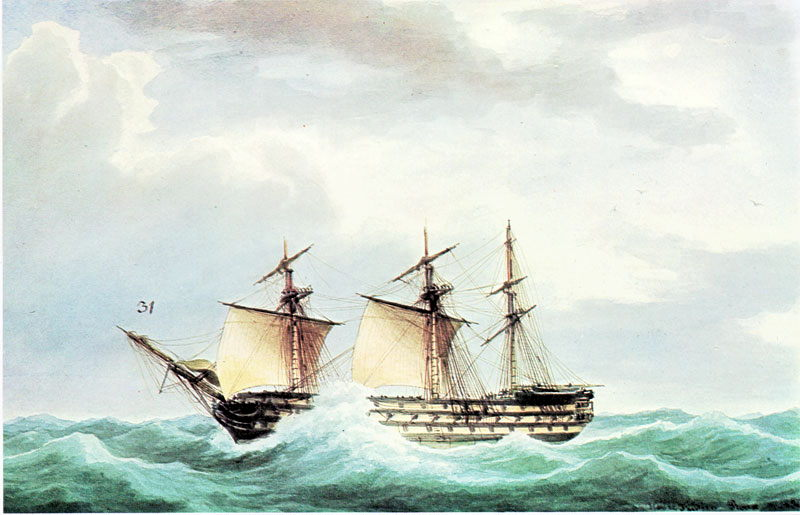
74-gun Algésiras (bizarely depicted as a three-decker)

=== Attempt at uniting the Brest, Lorient and Rochefort squadrons ===
In May 1808, Willaumez was appointed to command a nine-ship, three-frigate and three-corvette squadron. It departed on 21 February 1809, with orders to make its junction with the division of Lorient that was blockaded in its harbour, attach these ships, attack the British squadron blockading Rochefort, attach the Rochefort squadron under Admiral Jacques Bergeret and, by then totaling 18 ships, sail to the Caribbean to rescue Martinique and Guadeloupe.

Willaumez led his division to Lorient and Rochefort as instructed, but none of the squadrons joined forces with his: The Lorient squadron was becalmed and could not depart until after Willaumez had left, leading to the Battle of Les Sables-d'Olonne; and the Rochefort squadron was too affected by sickness to sail.

Displeased with Willaumez' performance, Napoléon removed him from command of the fleet and kept him in subordinate roles from then on. The arrival of a large British squadron blockaded Willaumez himself in Rochefort, where the concentration of French ships constituted a tempting target for the British. They eventually attacked with fireships at the Battle of the Basque Roads.

=== Later life ===
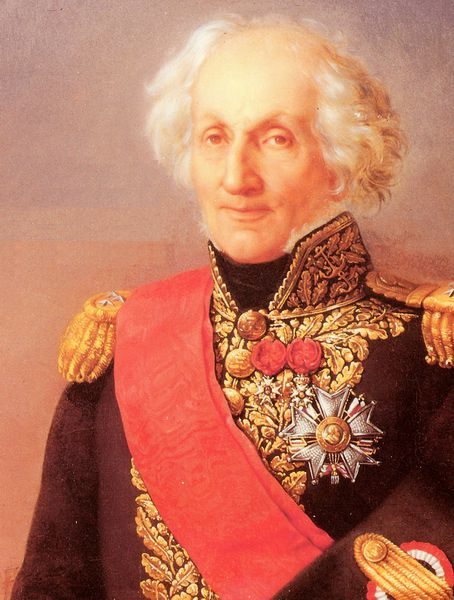
Willaumez in 1840, wearing the badge and silver star of Grand Officier on the Legion of Honour. Portrait by Pierre-Victorien Lottin.

In 1811, Willaumez was ordered to Holland to command a division in the fleet under Admiral Jan Willem de Winter. However, his declining health forced him to request his transfer back to France after one year.

In 1819, after the Bourbon Restoration, Willaumez was promoted to vice admiral. In 1825, he published a dictionary of naval terms, and later presided over the Council of Constructions of the Navy. He also commissioned a collection of ship models. He was promoted Grand-Officier of the Order of the Legion of Honour in 1828.

In January 1834, Willaumez became the president of the Council of Constructions. In 1836, he led an enquiry, along with Baron Rolland, into the destruction by fire of the 120-gun ship Trocadéro.

In 1837, he was made a pair de France, and retired. In 1844, Louis-Phillipe made him a Count, a title that Willaumez transmitted to then Captain Bouët, who from then on assumed the name of Bouët-Willaumez.

== Honours ==
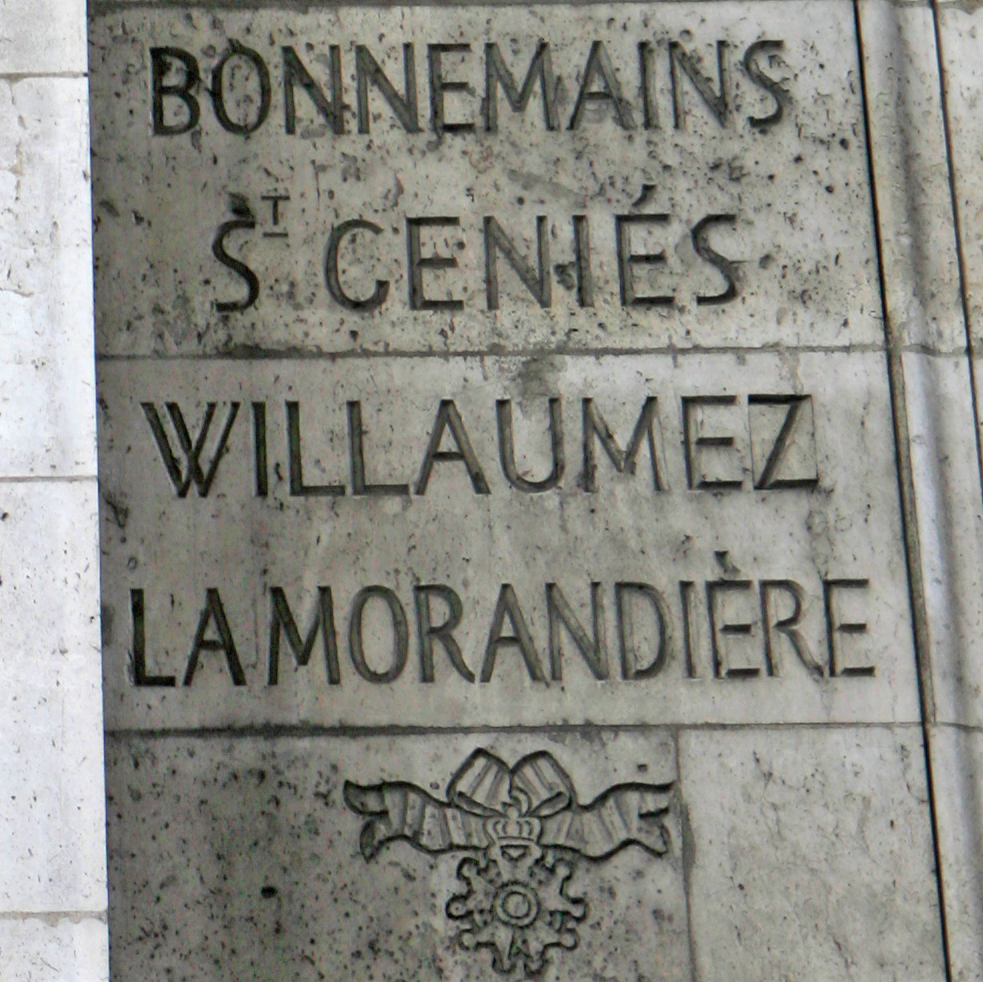
Willaumez' name on the Arc de Triomphe in Paris.

- pair de France in 1837
- His name is inscribed on the 22nd column of the Southern pillar of the Arc de Triomphe in Paris.

== Legacy ==
During the Empire, Willaumez advocated the construction of strong, sixty-gun frigates, capable of carrying food for ten months and water for four, mounting the new 30-pounder long gun rather than the 36- and 24-pounders that dated from before the French Revolution. In 1822, the project was adopted by Jean Tupinier, resulting in the Surveillante-class frigates and similar developments during the Bourbon Restoration.

In his Dictionnaire de marine, Willaumez thus defined the term Marine:

Sublime art, masterpiece of the courage of mankind, too complex to be entirely submitted to calculation, and that was ever only enriched, and shall ever only be enriched, with the help of the experience and observations of seamen of good judgement. (Note: MARINE, s.f. Art sublime, chef-d'œuvre de la hardiesse des hommes, trop compliqué pour être entièrement soumis au calcul, et qui ne s'est enrichi et ne s'enrichira jamais qu'avec le secours de l'expérience, et des observations des hommes de mer doués d'un bon jugement. Dictionnaire de marine, p.395)

== Works ==
- Willaumez, Jean-Baptiste-Philibert (1820). Dictionnaire de marine : suivi d'un appendice sur un modèle de frégate de premier rang, dont la construction est ordonnée a Brest. Paris: Bachelier. OCLC 561133198.
- Willaumez, Jean-Baptiste-Philibert (1825). Dictionnaire de marine, nouvelle éd., revue, corrigée et considérablement augmentée Avec sept planches. Paris: Bachelier. OCLC 719418489.
- Willaumez, Jean-Baptiste-Philibert (1831). Dictionnaire de marine. Nouvelle édition. Paris: Bachelier. OCLC 459033992.
- Willaumez, Jean-Baptiste-Philibert (1998) [1831]. Dictionnaire de marine : avec huit planches. Douarnenez: Chasse-marée/ArMen. OCLC 56903147.

== Notes and references ==
=== References ===
- Hennequin, Joseph François Gabriel (1835). Biographie maritime ou notices historiques sur la vie et les campagnes des marins célèbres français et étrangers (in French). Vol. 1. Paris: Regnault éditeur.
- Herpin, Eugène (1913). Mémoires du Chevalier de Fréminville (1787-1848) (in French). Paris: Librairie ancienne H. Champion.
- James, William (2002) [1827]. The Naval History of Great Britain, Volume 3, 1800–1805. London: Conway Maritime Press. ISBN 0-85177-907-7.
- Levot, Prosper (1866). Les gloires maritimes de la France: notices biographiques sur les plus célèbres marins (in French). Bertrand.
- Merrien, Jean (1970). Un certain Chevalier de Fréminville 1787-1848 (in French). Éditions maritimes et d'outre-mer.
- Quintin, Danielle; Quintin, Bernard (2003). Dictionnaire des capitaines de Vaisseau de Napoléon (in French). S.P.M. ISBN 2-901952-42-9.
- Taillemite, Étienne (2010) [1988]. Histoire ignorée de la Marine française (in French). Editions Perrin. ISBN 978-2-262-03242-5.
- Troude, Onésime-Joachim (1867). Batailles navales de la France (in French). Vol. 3. Challamel ainé.
- Fonds Marine. Campagnes (opérations; divisions et stations navales; missions diverses). Inventaire de la sous-série Marine BB4. Tome premier : BB4 1 à 482 (1790–1826)
- Winfield, Rif; Roberts, Stephen S. (2015). French Warships in the Age of Sail 1786–1861: Design Construction, Careers and Fates. Seaforth Publishing. ISBN 978-1-84832-204-2.
