= French ship Patriote (1785) =

Ship of the line of the French Navy

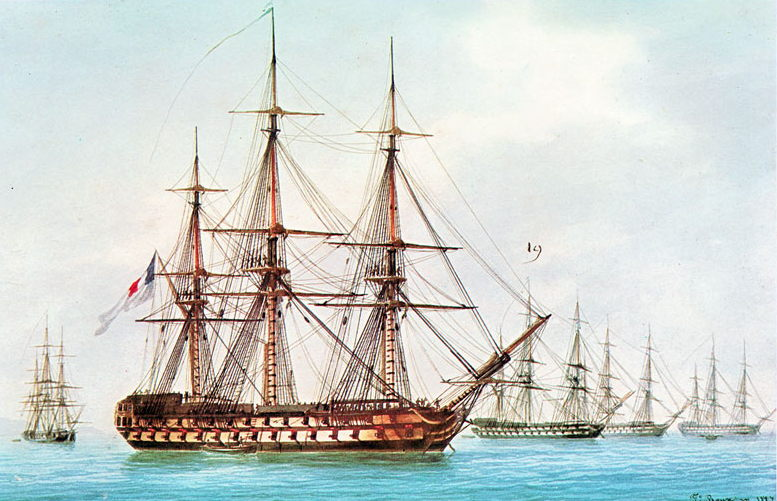
- Watercolour portrait of Patriote, by François Roux, commissioned by Willaumez

History

France
- Name: Patriote
- Namesake: Patriot
- Ordered: 28 January 1786
- Builder: Brest
- Laid down: October 1784
- Launched: 3 October 1785
- Commissioned: April 1786
- Decommissioned: May 1820
- Fate: Broken up 1832-33

General characteristics
- Displacement: 3,069 tonneaux
- Tons burthen: 1,537 port tonneaux
- Length: 55.87 m (183 ft 4 in)
- Beam: 14.46 m (47 ft 5 in)
- Draught: 7.15 m (23.5 ft)
- Depth of hold: 7.15 m (23 ft 5 in)
- Sail plan: Full-rigged ship
- Crew: 705
- Armament: 74 guns: Lower gun deck: 28 × 36-pounder long guns; Upper gun deck: 30 × 18-pounder long guns; Forecastle and Quarterdeck: 12 × 8-pounder long guns, 10 × 36-pounder carronades

Patriote was a 74-gun Téméraire-class ship of the line built for the French Navy during the 1780s. Completed in 1785, she played a minor role in the Napoleonic Wars.

== Description ==
The Téméraire-class ships had a length of 55.87 metres (183 ft 4 in), a beam of 14.46 metres (47 ft 5 in) and a depth of hold of 7.15 metres (23 ft 5 in). The ships displaced 3,069 tonneaux and had a mean draught of 7.15 metres (23 ft 5 in). They had a tonnage of 1,537 port tonneaux. Their crew numbered 705 officers and ratings during wartime. They were fitted with three masts and ship rigged.

The muzzle-loading, smoothbore armament of the Téméraire class consisted of twenty-eight 36-pounder long guns on the lower gun deck, thirty 18-pounder long guns and thirty 18-pounder long guns on the upper gun deck. On the quarterdeck and forecastle were a total of a dozen 8-pounder long guns and ten 36-pounder carronades.

== Construction and career ==
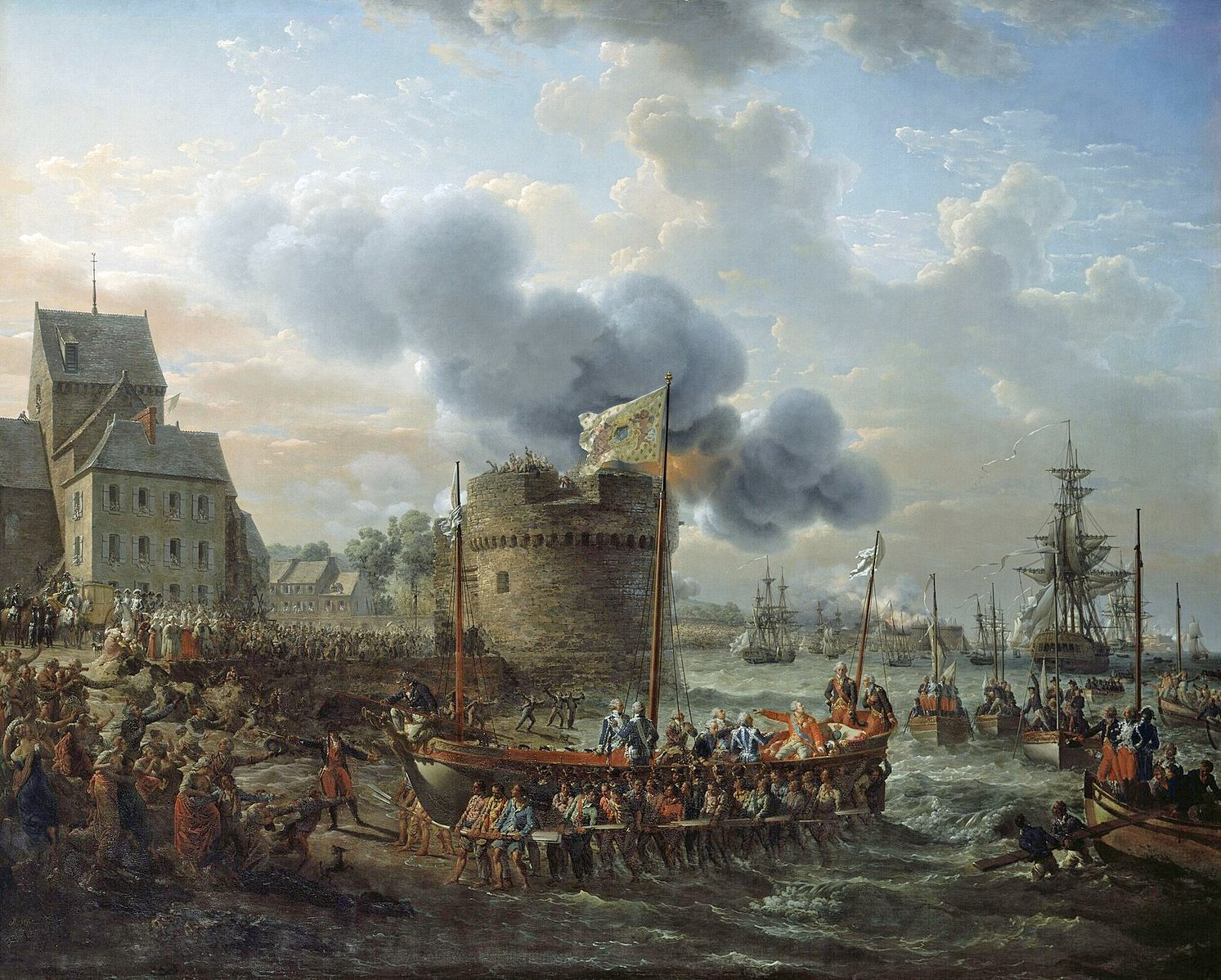
Louis XVI visiting Cherbourg in 1786, by Louis-Philippe Crépin

Patriote was laid down at the Arsenal de Brest in October 1784. The ship was launched on 3 October 1785 and was named on 21 April 1786. She was completed that same month.

In 1786, Patriote was commanded by Captain Renaud d'Aleins, flag captain to Chef d'Escadre Albert de Rions, with Major d'escadre Buor de La Charoulière also aboard. She was the flagship of the Escadre d'évolution that organised a naval review and a simulated naval battle for the visit of Louis XVI to Cherbourg Naval Base.

From 1790 to 1791, Patriote was under Huon de Kermadec, part of the squadron under Bruni d'Entrecasteaux.

In September 1793, during the Siege of Toulon, she was taken by the British, who removed her armament and embarked the French sailors sympathetic to the Republic. Admiral Hood having agreed to transport them to a safe port, she then ferried them to Brest, where she arrived on 16 October. In 1794 she took part in the battle of the Glorious First of June, in the Croisière du Grand Hiver winter campaign in 1794 and 1795, and in the Expédition d'Irlande in December 1796. In 1806 she was damaged in a hurricane in the Caribbean and went to Chesapeake Bay for shelter where she was blockaded by the British and laid off Annapolis, Maryland, for repairs until returning to France. From 1821, she was used as a hulk.
