= French frigate Poursuivante =

Two frigates of the French Navy have borne the name French frigate Poursuivante, after the French spelling of pursuer:

- French frigate Poursuivante (1796), a Romaine-class frigate
- French frigate Poursuivante (1844)
