= Alexandre de Thy =

French Navy officer of the War of American Independence

Alexandre de Thy (Note: Also written "d'Ethy".) was a French Navy officer. He served in the War of American Independence.

== Biography ==
Thy was born to an aristocratic family. He was cousin to Nicolas-Christiern de Thy de Milly.

Thy joined the Navy as a Garde-Marine on 8 January 1751. He was promoted to ensign in 1755, and Lieutenant on 1 October 1764. He spent most of his career in the Eastern Mediterranean.

In 1733, he was made a Knight in the Order of Saint Louis.

On 13 March 1779, he was promoted to captain. He commanded the 74-gun Citoyen in the Squadron under De Grasse, and took part in the Battle of the Saintes, where he was wounded. He was acquitted in the subsequent inquiry into the battle.

On 1 May 1786, he was promoted to Chef de Division. The year after, De Thy expressed strong reservations about Buor's treaty of naval tactics.

== Sources and references ==
Notes

Citations

References

- Blondet, Alexandre (2019). Petites et Grandes Révolutions de la Famille de Milly.
- Chevalier, Edouard (1877). Histoire de la marine française pendant la guerre de l'indépendance Américaine précédée d'une étude sur la marine militaire de la France et sur ses institutions depuis le commencement du 17e siècle jusqu'à l'année 1877. Hachette.
- Contenson, Ludovic (1934). La Société des Cincinnati de France et la guerre d'Amérique (1778-1783). Paris: éditions Auguste Picard. OCLC 7842336.
- Lacour-Gayet, Georges (1905). La marine militaire de la France sous le règne de Louis XVI. Paris: Honoré Champion. OCLC 763372623.
