= French ship Orion (1787) =

Ship of the line of the French Navy

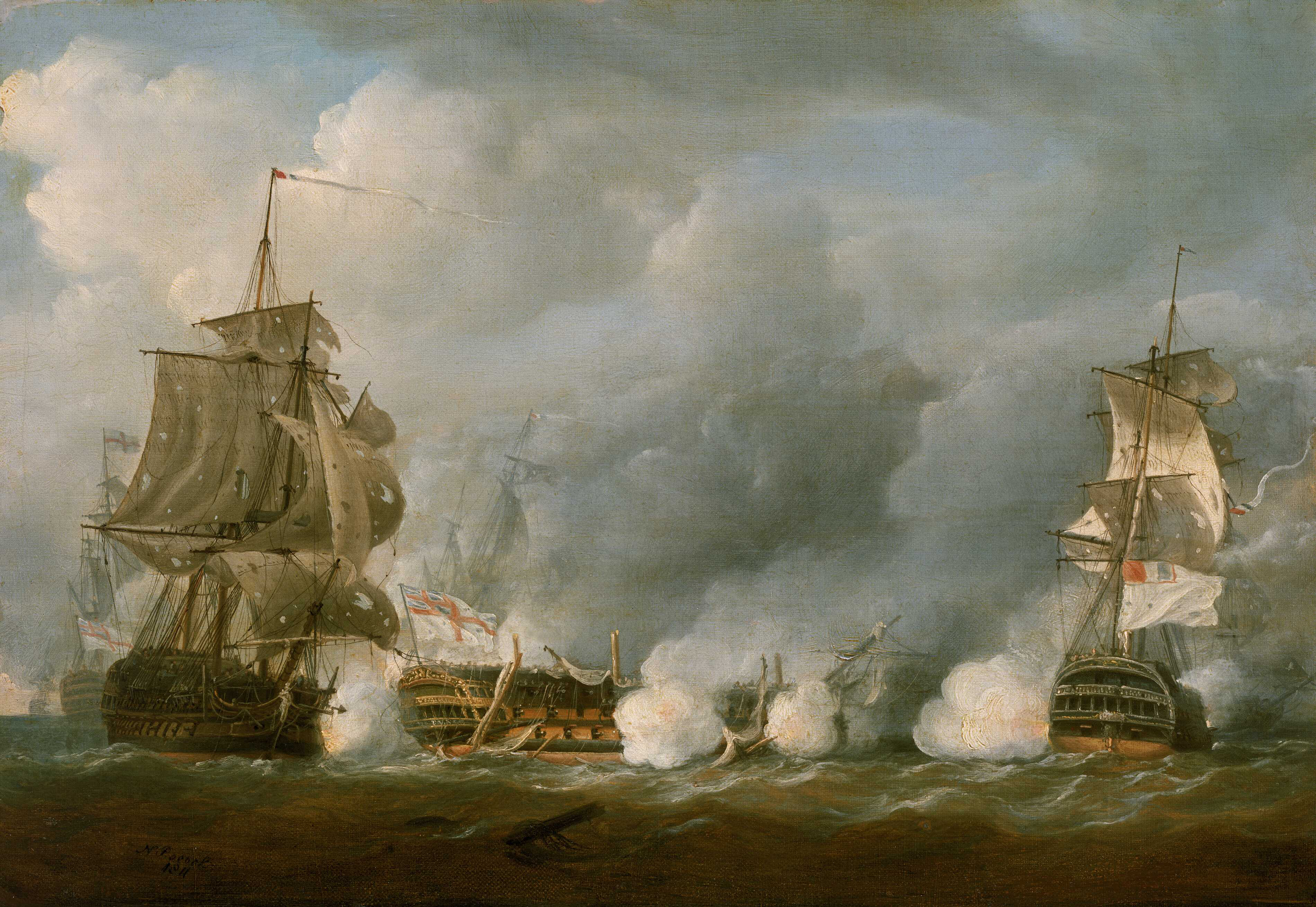
- Mucius (right) at the Glorious First of June

History

France
- Name: Orion
- Namesake: Orion; Gaius Mucius Scævola
- Builder: Rochefort
- Laid down: October 1784
- Launched: 18 April 1787
- Completed: 1788
- Stricken: 23 March 1804
- Fate: Broken up in 1804

General characteristics
- Displacement: 3,069 tonneaux
- Tons burthen: 1,537 port tonneaux
- Length: 55.87 m (183 ft 4 in)
- Beam: 14.46 m (47 ft 5 in)
- Draught: 7.15 m (23.5 ft)
- Depth of hold: 7.15 m (23 ft 5 in)
- Sail plan: Full-rigged ship
- Crew: 705
- Armament: 74 guns: Lower gun deck: 28 × 36 pdr guns; Upper gun deck: 30 × 18 pdr guns; Forecastle and Quarterdeck: 12 × 8 pdr guns, 10 × 36 pdr carronades

Orion was a 74-gun Téméraire-class ship of the line built for the French Navy during the 1780s. Completed in 1788, she played a minor role in the French Revolutionary Wars.

== Description ==
The Téméraire-class ships had a length of 55.87 metres (183 ft 4 in), a beam of 14.46 metres (47 ft 5 in) and a depth of hold of 7.15 metres (23 ft 5 in). The ships displaced 3,069 tonneaux and had a mean draught of 7.15 metres (23 ft 5 in). They had a tonnage of 1,537 port tonneaux. Their crew numbered 705 officers and ratings during wartime. They were fitted with three masts and ship rigged.

The muzzle-loading, smoothbore armament of the Téméraire class consisted of twenty-eight 36-pounder long guns on the lower gun deck, thirty 18-pounder long guns and thirty 18-pounder long guns on the upper gun deck. On the quarterdeck and forecastle were a total of a dozen 8-pounder long guns and ten 36-pounder carronades.

== Construction and career ==
Orion was ordered on 15 February 1782 and the ship was named on 1 June. She was laid down at the Arsenal de Rochefort in October 1784 and launched on 17 December 1787. Construction had been delayed by a lack of carpenters. The ship was completed sometime the following year.

In 1790, Orion was under Buor de La Charoulière. She was renamed Mucius Scévola in November 1793 and then Mucius on 30 November. In 1794 she took part in the battle of the Glorious First of June, helping her sister ship Impétueux battling HMS Marlborough, as well as in both the First Battle of Groix and the Battle of Groix in June 1795. In December 1796 she took part in the Expédition d'Irlande, an attempt at landing an army in Ireland, before being struck and broken up in Brest. The ship was condemned on 13 October 1803 and her demolition was completed on 8 April 1804.
