= Juno (1797 ship) =

History

Great Britain
- Name: Juno
- Namesake: Juno (mythology)
- Owner: 1797:Hausman; 1804:Davies, Dale & Co.
- Builder: Lancaster
- Launched: 1797
- Captured: 14 August 1804 and burnt

General characteristics
- Tons burthen: 259 (bm)
- Complement: 1798:20; 1804:44
- Armament: 1797:12 × 9-pounder guns + 2 × 18-pounder carronades; 1798:20 × 4&9&18-pounder cannons; 1804:18 × 6-pounder guns

Juno was an English merchantman launched in 1797 at Lancaster. A French frigate captured her in a notable single-ship action in 1804 off the American coast and later burnt her.

== Career ==
Juno appeared in Lloyd's Register for 1797 with Postlethwaite, master, Hausman, owner, and trade Lancaster–Martinique. The entry in 1798 shows her master changing to Collins. Captain John Collins acquired a letter of marque on 14 April. 1798.

In 1803, Juno's master changed from "Hwthnthw" to L.Affleck, her owner from Worfwick to Dale & Co., (Note: Messrs. Davies, Dale & Co.) and her trade from Liverpool–Barbados to Liverpool−Madeira.

Lloyd's Register for 1804 showed Juno with L. Affleck, master, and Dale & Co., owner, and trade Liverpool−Madeira.

== Fate ==
On 14 August 1804, Juno encountered the French frigate Poursuivante some 70 leagues from Wilmington. Juno was greatly out-gunned and her crew outnumbered but Captain Lutwidge Affleck decided to resist. After two hours he struck; Juno had lost two men killed and her mate wounded. Her hull, masts, sails, and rigging were also heavily damaged. The French commander returned Affleck's sword to him in recognition of his courageous resistance. (Note: The entry for Juno in the 1804 Lloyd's Register has the annotation "captured" by her name.)

Juno was too damaged to sail back to France so Poursuivante attempted to bring her into Charleston, but the Americans refused her entry. The French then stripped Juno of her cargo and burnt her.

Juno's underwriters in London presented Captain Affleck with a bowl inscribed with the major facts of the engagement. The Liverpool Committee of Underwriters presented him with a bill of exchange drawn on London for £120 for the purchase of piece of plate.
