= Action of 28 June 1803 =

- Part of the blockade of Saint-Domingue
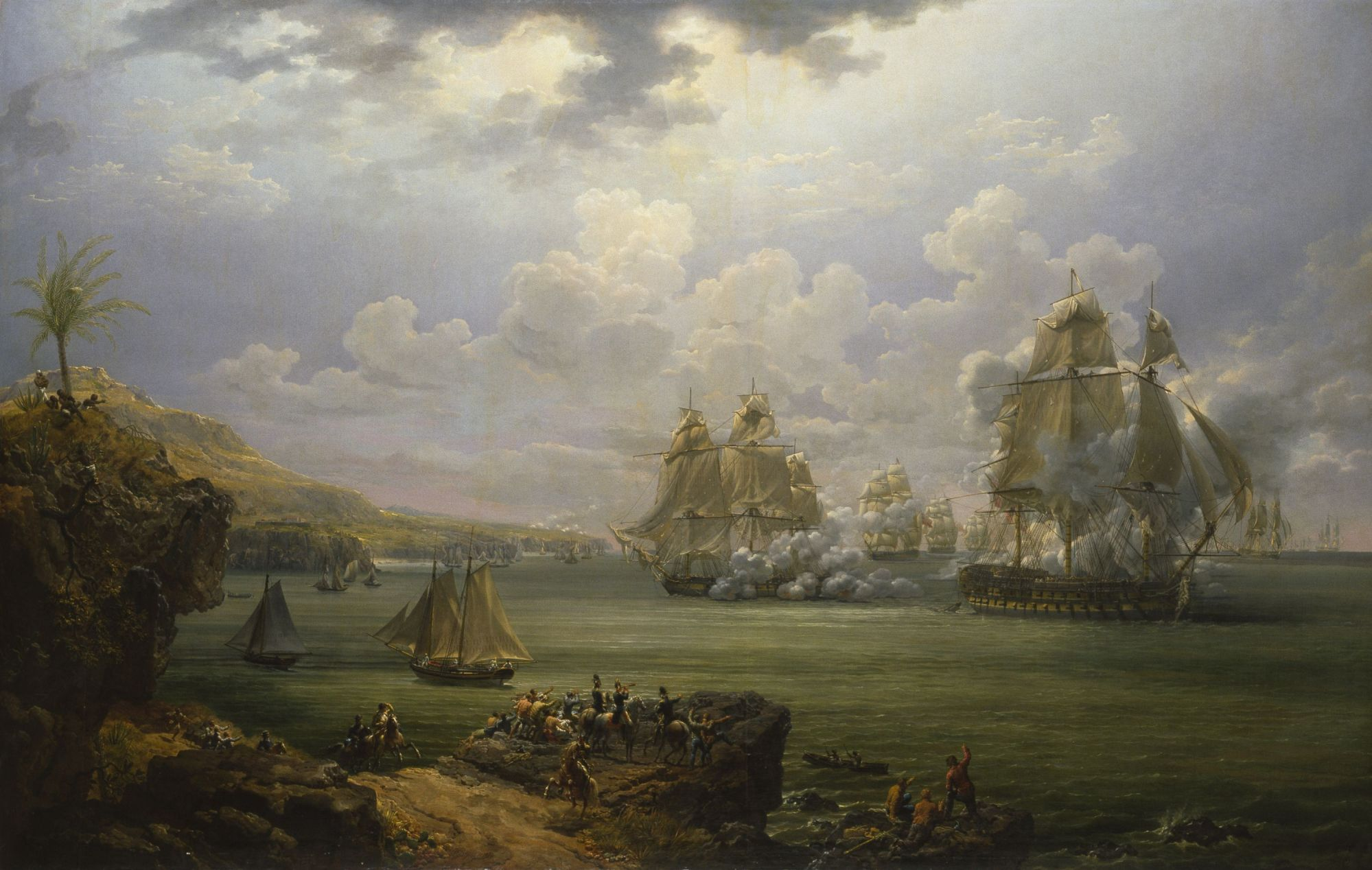
- 1819 painting of the battle
Date	28 June 1803
Location	Off Môle-Saint-Nicolas, Caribbean Sea
Result	Inconclusive

Belligerents
France	Great Britain

Commanders and leaders
Jean-Baptiste Willaumez; Jean-Pierre Bargeau	Henry William Bayntun; Charles Brisbane; John Hills

Strength
1 frigate 1 corvette	3 ships of the line

Casualties and losses
10 killed 15 wounded 1 corvette captured	Unknown

The action of 28 June 1803 was the opening engagement of the blockade of Saint-Domingue after the collapse of the Treaty of Amiens and the British declaration of war on France on 18 May 1803 as part of the War of the Third Coalition.

The French frigate Poursuivante and corvette Mignonne, both partially armed en flûte and unaware of the recently outbreak of war, met three British 74-gun ships of the line. Mignonne was overhauled and captured, but Poursuivante, sailing close to shore, managed to outmanoeuvre HMS Hercule and deliver a raking broadside before escaping into Môle-Saint-Nicolas.

The feat of a frigate managing to escape a ship of the line yielded high praise for Jean-Baptiste Philibert Willaumez, who had commanded Poursuivante. A large painting by Louis-Philippe Crépin was commissioned in 1819 to commemorate the event.

== Background ==
France had been at peace with Britain since the 1802 Treaty of Amiens, allowing First Consul Napoleon to consolidate France's grasp on the French colonial empire. Such efforts were concentrated on the colony of Saint-Domingue, where the Haitian Revolution had raged since 1791. Napoleon sent the Saint-Domingue expedition under General Charles Leclerc to restore direct French rule in the colony. Meanwhile, the Treaty of Amiens proved to be an unsuitable settlement of Anglo-French differences; its application by both parties became erratic and tensions grew. On 18 May 1803, Britain declared war on France, setting the War of the Third Coalition into motion. In late June, this news had yet to reach French forces in Saint-Domingue. On 27 June 1803, the 40-gun frigate Poursuivante, under Jean-Baptiste Philibert Willaumez, departed Les Cayes bound for Cap‑Français, in the company of the 16-gun corvette Mignonne, under Commander Jean-Pierre Bargeau.

Neither of the ships was fully armed or manned: Poursuivante, pierced to mount twenty-four 24-pounder long guns on her battery and sixteen 8-pounders on her castles, carried only 22 and 12 respectively and, more critically, had only 25 shots for each gun and a crew of only 150 men; Mignonne, nominally carrying sixteen 18-pounder long guns, was equipped only with twelve 12-pounders and an 80-man complement. A 50-ship British convoy was sailing off Môle-Saint-Nicolas under escort of three 74-gun ships of the line: they were the 74-gun HMS Hercule, HMS Cumberland and HMS Goliath, under Captain Henry William Bayntun, Captain Charles Brisbane and acting captain John Hills respectively. In the early morning of 28 June 1803, the two formations came in view of one another.

== Battle ==
Spotting two strange sails in-shore, the British escort detached to investigate and Willaumez soon identified the three 74s as British. Unaware of the outbreak of the war but suspicious of the intentions of the British, Willaumez prepared a defence in case of attack. At eight, the 74-gun HMS Hercule came in range; after signaling the other ships in her division, she hoisted the British flag, prompting Poursuivante to hoist the French colours. Meanwhile, Goliath chased Mignonne and taking advantage of the sea wind whereas the corvette was becalmed, quickly overhauled her; after a few token shots, Mignonne struck her colours to her overwhelming opponent.

At nine, Hercule fired a ball shot at Poursuivante, initiating the battle. As Hercule closed to the shore to engage, she had less and less water under her keel and came into lighter and erratic winds; although these advantaged the shallower and more maneuverable frigate, Poursuivante lacked the ammunition to energetically answer Hercule's fire, and her diminished crew could not simultaneously man her batteries and handle her sails. On the other hand, because she had to ration her fire, Poursuivante aimed careful shots that soon caused significant damage to Hercule's rigging.

After two hours of mutual cannonade, at eleven, the wind fell and both ships almost came to a sudden halt, their main sailing resource now the gusts of wind from the shore. Taking advantage of this change in the weather, Willaumez ordered his gunners to cease fire and help manoeuver his frigate, quickly coming in position to rake Hercule, only then firing a devastating broadside at her stern. Hercule, in order to avoid running aground, disengaged, allowing Poursuivante to reach the safety of Môle-Saint-Nicolas, cheered by the crowd and saluted by the artillery of the forts.

== Aftermath ==
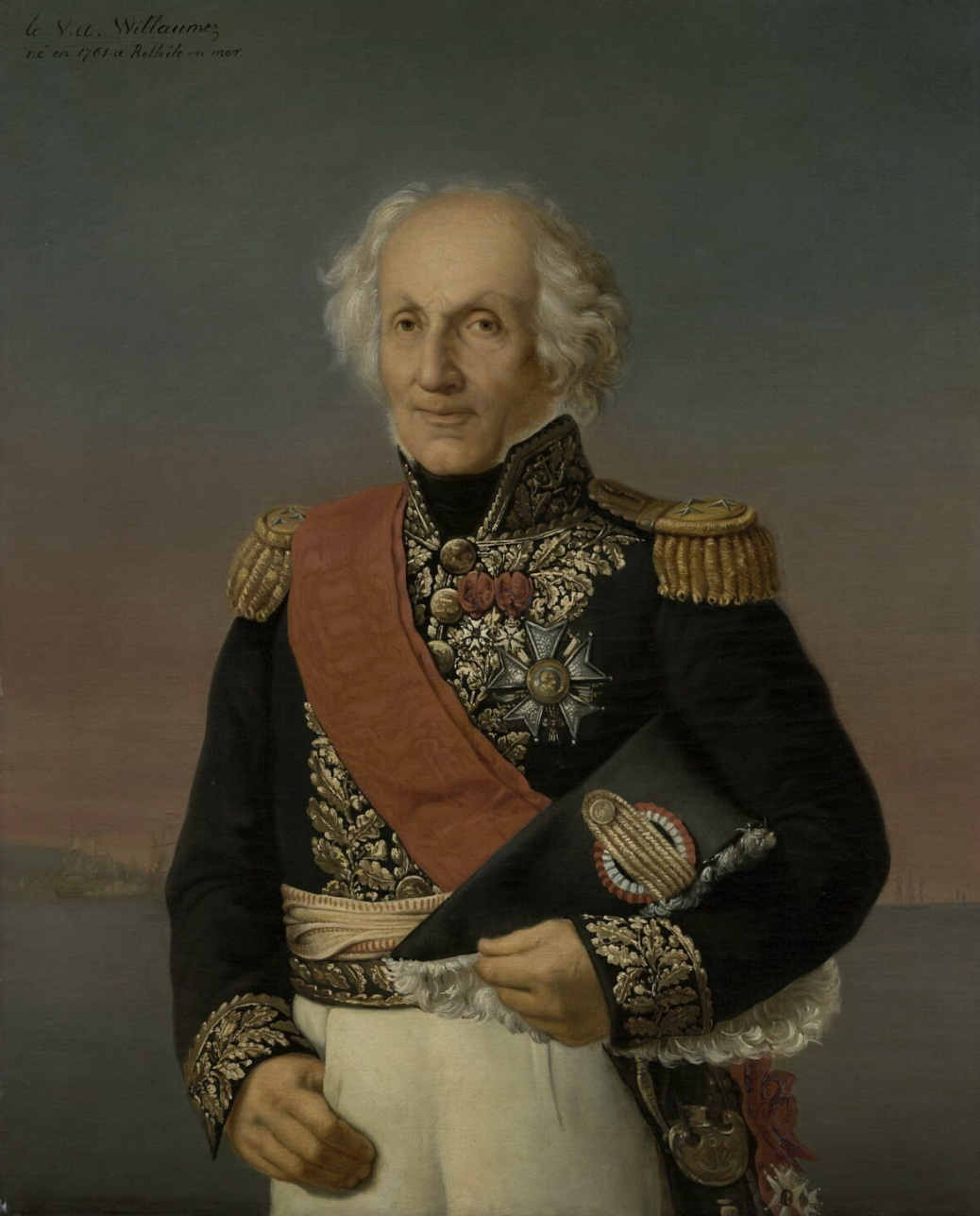
Portrait of Willaumez later in his career

Hercule's rigging had suffered considerably, but she only had a few wounded. Hills was forced to retire with his ship to Jamaica for repairs; HMS Vanguard replaced Hercule in Bayntun's squadron. Though Mignonne served briefly in the Royal Navy, there is no record of her actually being commissioned; she grounded and was condemned in 1804. Poursuivante had ten men killed and fifteen wounded, her hull had sustained several shots and her rigging was much damaged. As Cap‑Français lacked the resources to repair the frigate, Willaumez had to sail her back to France.

After Willaumez departed and sailed around the south of Cuba, a violent gust of wind dismasted Poursuivante, forcing Willaumez to make a port call in Baltimore to repair his frigate. When ready, he departed the Chesapeake, avoided the British blockade of Saint-Domingue and crossed the Atlantic, reaching Rochefort on 28 May 1804. There, he was intercepted by a British ship of the line, which he battled for 30 minutes before breaking off and finding shelter at Île-d'Aix. Poursuivante hardly sailed again, and became a hulk in June 1806. Willaumez had been made a Knight in the Order of the Legion of Honour in February. He was promoted to Officer in June, and congratulated by Navy minister Decrès. A large painting by Louis-Philippe Crépin was commissioned in 1819 to commemorate the event; it long decorated the office of the Minister of the Navy, and is now in display at the Musée national de la Marine in Paris.
