= Pierre-Louis François Buor de La Charoulière =

French Navy officer

- Born: 15 January 1735; Vairé, France
- Died: 2 April 1803 (aged 68) Les Sables-d'Olonne, France
- Branch: French Navy
- Rank: Contre-amiral
- Conflicts: Battle of Martinique; Action of 15 May 1780; Action of 19 May 1780
- Other work: Traité de tactique navale

Pierre-Louis François Buor de La Charoulière (Vairé, 15 January 1735 — Les Sables-d'Olonne, 2 April 1803) was a French Navy officer. He notably served as major d'escadre of Guichen's squadron during the War of American Independence.

== Biography ==
Buor was born to the family of Marie-Françoise Marchand de la Mulnière, and of François-André Buor de La Charoulière.

Buor joined the Navy as a Garde-Marine on 6 August 1756. He served on Duc de Bourgogne in 1756, on Zéphyr in 1757, and later on Éveillé, on which he took part in the Battle of Quiberon Bay on 20 November 1759. In October 1764, he was promoted to Ensign and appointed to Utile, in which he took part in the Larache expedition.

In 1776, Buor served on Protée with a training cruise with the Escadre d'évolution. He was promoted to Lieutenant on 4 April 1777.

Buor captained the 80-gun Couronne, as flag captain to Guichen. He took part in the Battle of Martinique on 17 April 1780, as well as in the actions of 15 May and 19 May 1780.

Buor returned to France in October 1780. On 9 May 1781, he was promoted to captain and appointed to the command of the 80-gun Triomphant. In June, he transferred to the 110-gun Bretagne as Major d'escadre.

In 1783, he married Marie-Marguerite-Charlotte Cairon de Merville.

In 1786, Buor served as major d'escadre for the 12-ship Escadre d'évolution, on the 74-gun Patriote, under Chef d'Escadre Albert de Rions. He was at Cherbourg when a naval review and a simulated naval battle took place as Louis XVI visited the harbour. That same year, Navy Minister Castries tasked Buor to write a treaty about naval tactics. Traité de tactique navale was published in 1787, drawing stiff criticism from De Thy.

In 1790, Buor was given command of the 75-gun Orion. He retired with the rank of Contre-amiral on 1 January 1792. General Bonaparte requested his help to organise the French campaign in Egypt and Syria in 1798, but Buor's failing health prevented him from taking command. He died in poverty in Olonne on 2 April 1803.

== Sources and references ==
Notes

Citations

References

- Lacour-Gayet, Georges (1905). La marine militaire de la France sous le règne de Louis XVI. Paris: Honoré Champion. OCLC 763372623.
- La Monneraye, Pierre-Bruno-Jean (1998). Bonnichon, Philippe (ed.). Souvenirs de 1760 à 1791. Librairie Droz. ISBN 978-2-7453-0079-9. OCLC 165892922.
- Taillemite, Étienne (1982). Dictionnaire des Marins français. Paris: Éditions maritimes et d'Outre-Mer. ISBN 9782707000316. OCLC 239744936.
- Troude, Onésime-Joachim (1867). Batailles navales de la France (in French). Vol. 2. Challamel ainé. OCLC 836362484.
