= HMS Cumberland (1774) =

Elizabeth-class ship of the line of the Royal Navy

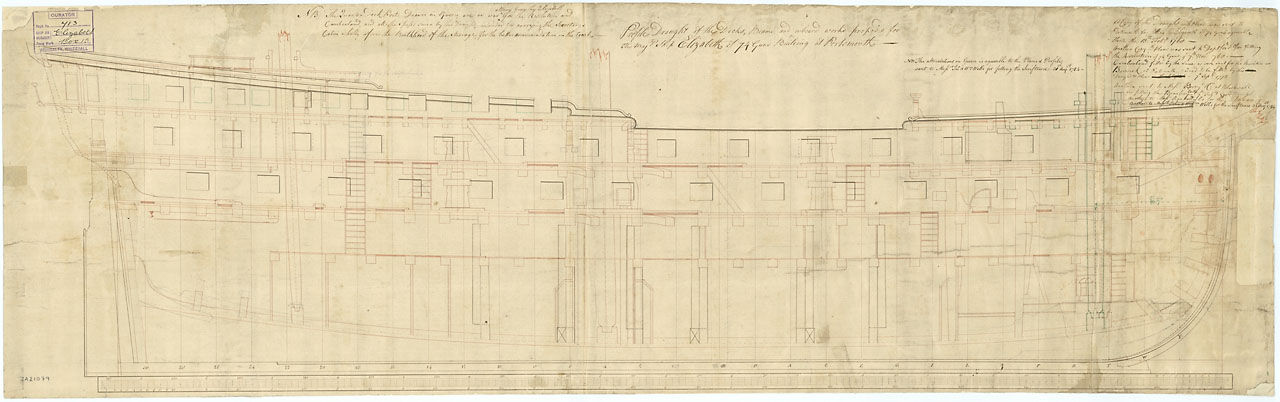
- Cumberland

History

Great Britain
- Name: HMS Cumberland
- Ordered: 8 June 1768
- Builder: Deptford Dockyard
- Laid down: 7 January 1769
- Launched: 29 March 1774
- Fate: Broken up, 1804
- Notes: Participated in: Battle of Cape St Vincent; Battle of Cuddalore

General characteristics
- Class & type: 74-gun third-rate Elizabeth-class ship of the line
- Tons burthen: 1647 (bm)
- Length: 168 ft 6 in (51.36 m) (gundeck)
- Beam: 46 ft (14 m)
- Depth of hold: 19 ft 9 in (6.02 m)
- Propulsion: Sails
- Sail plan: Full-rigged ship
- Armament: Gundeck: 28 × 32-pounder guns; Upper gundeck: 28 × 18-pounder guns; QD: 14 × 9-pounder guns; Fc: 4 × 9-pounder guns

HMS Cumberland was a 74-gun third rate ship of the line of the Royal Navy, launched on 29 March 1774 at Deptford Dockyard.

She participated in actions against the French Navy both prior to and during the Napoleonic Wars. She was broken up in 1804.

== Pre-Napoleonic Wars ==
She participated in the Battle of Cape St Vincent in 1780. She captured the French 18-gun privateer ship-sloop Duc de Chartres in c. February 1781. The Royal Navy took the privateer into service as HMS Duc de Chartres.

Cumberland then sailed to the East Indies, where she participated in the Battle of Cuddalore in 1783.

== Napoleonic Wars ==
On 11 May 1801 she, in company with HMS Carnatic and HMS Sans Pareil, made contact with USS Ganges in the West Indies, Lat 22.01 N. Cumberland took an incidental part in the action of 28 June 1803, during the Blockade of Saint-Domingue. Two days later, Cumberland and her squadron were between Jean-Rabel and St. Nichola Mole in the West Indies, having just parted with a convoy when they spotted a sail of what appeared to be a large French warship. Cumberland and Vanguard approached her and after a few shots from Vanguard the French vessel surrendered, having suffered two men badly wounded, and being greatly outgunned. She proved to be the frigate Créole, of 44 guns, primarily 18-pounders, under the command of Citizen Le Ballard. She had been sailing from Cape François to Port au Prince with General Morgan (the second in command of San Domingo), his staff, and 530 soldiers on board, in addition to her crew of 150 men. The Royal Navy took her into service as HMS Creole.

While the British were taking possession of Creole, a small French navy schooner, under the command of a lieutenant, and sailing the same trajectory as Creole, sailed into the squadron and she too was seized. She had on board 100 bloodhounds from Cuba, which were "intended to accompany the Army serving against the Blacks."

== Fate ==
Cumberland was broken up in 1804.
