= French frigate Poursuivante (1796) =

Romaine class frigate in the French Navy

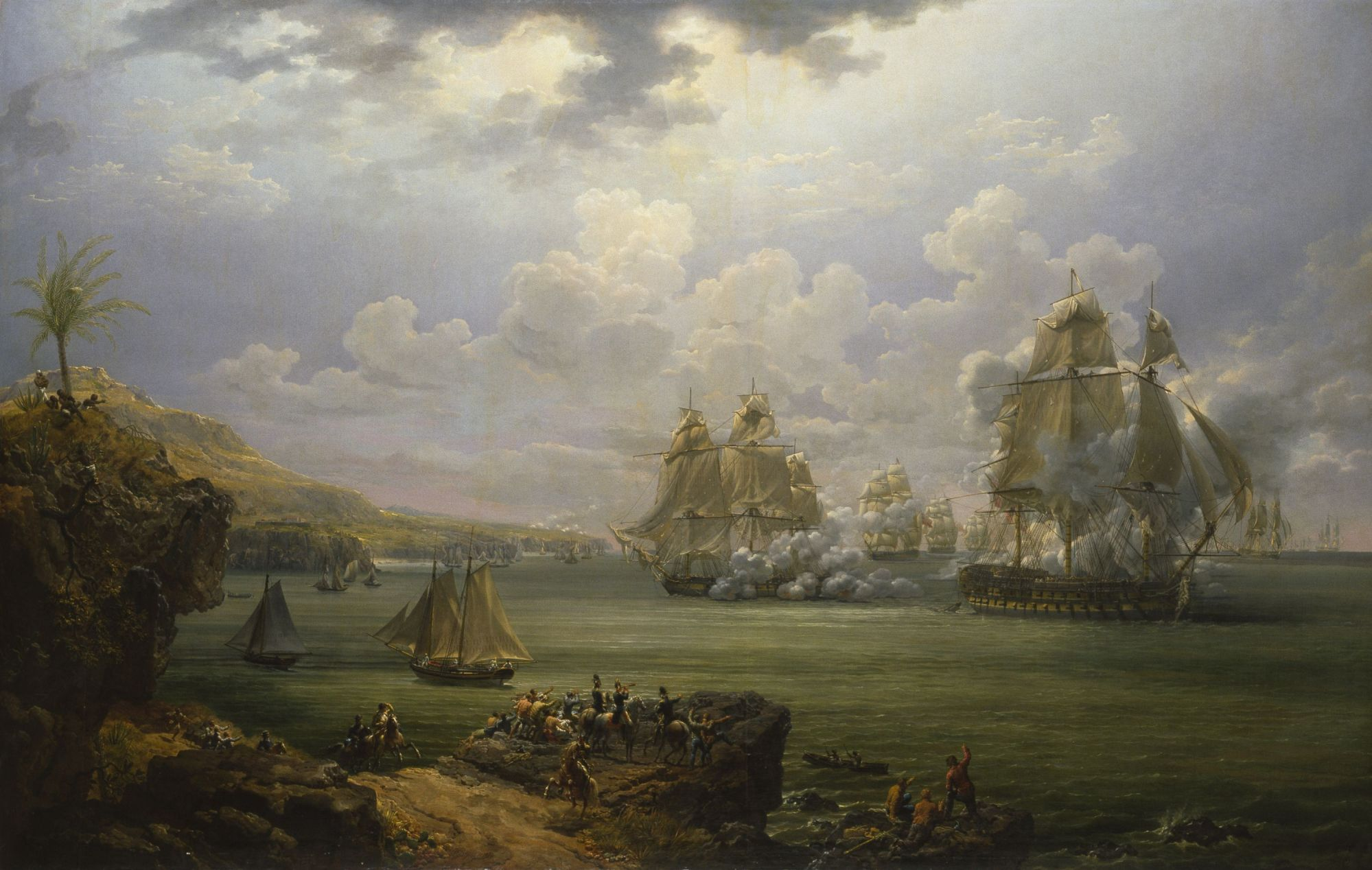
- Poursuivante (centre-right) at the action of 28 June 1803

History

France
- Name: Poursuivante
- Namesake: “Chaser”
- Builder: Dunkirk shipyard. Design by Pierre-Alexandre Forfait.
- Laid down: 20 February 1794
- Launched: 23 May 1796
- Commissioned: May 1798
- Stricken: 1 September 1805
- Homeport: Bordeaux
- Fate: Broken up

General characteristics
- Class & type: Romaine-class frigate
- Displacement: 700 tonnes
- Length: 45.5 m (149 ft 3 in)
- Beam: 11.8 m (38 ft 9 in)
- Draught: 5 m (16 ft 5 in)
- Propulsion: Sail
- Armament: 40 guns: 24 × 24-pounders; 16 × 8-pounders
- Armour: Timber

Poursuivante ("chaser") was a Romaine-class frigate of the French Navy.

== Career ==
In June 1800, Poursuivante took part in the battle of Dunkirk under commander Oreille. In 1802, she departed Flushing to ferry troops to Saint-Domingue, under capitaine de vaisseau Jean-Baptiste Philibert Willaumez. She arrived as the Haitian Revolution raged. The ships Duguay-Trouin, Annibal and Swiftsure, as well as frigate Précieuse, Infatigable were also in Haiti.

On 18 May 1803, after the Treaty of Amiens was cancelled and war broke out between France and Great Britain. En route for Saint-Domingue with the 16-gun corvette Mignonne, she encountered a British convoy, was chased by HMS Hercule, and took part in the fights of the Blockade of Saint-Domingue. Largely outgunned, Poursuivante managed to manoeuvre behind Hercule and in the action of 28 June 1803, managed to rake her, disturbing her operations enough to be able to reach harbour. Mignonne was captured by HMS Goliath.

In October, Poursuivante reffited in Baltimore, from where she departed in March 1804. On 14 August 1804, Poursuivante captured Juno in a notable single-ship action off the American coast and later burnt her. During her journey back to France, Poursuivante met and evaded another British ship.

== Fate ==
Poursuivante was converted to a hulk in Rochefort in June 1806.
