= French ship Impétueux (1787) =

Ship of the line of the French Navy

- Scale model of Achille, sister ship of French ship Impétueux (1787), on display at the Musée national de la Marine in Paris.

History

France
- Name: Impétueux
- Namesake: Impetuous
- Builder: Rochefort
- Laid down: 1786
- Launched: 25 August 1787
- Commissioned: 1788
- Captured: 1 June 1794

Great Britain
- Name: Impétueux
- Acquired: 1 June 1794
- Fate: Destroyed by fire on 24 August 1794

General characteristics
- Class & type: Téméraire-class ship of the line
- Displacement: 3,069 tonneaux
- Tons burthen: 1,537 port tonneaux
- Length: 55.87 m (183 ft 4 in)
- Beam: 14.46 m (47 ft 5 in)
- Draught: 7.15 m (23.5 ft)
- Depth of hold: 7.15 m (23 ft 5 in)
- Sail plan: Full-rigged ship
- Crew: 705
- Armament: 74 guns: Lower gun deck: 28 × 36 pdr guns; Upper gun deck: 30 × 18 pdr guns; Forecastle and Quarterdeck: 16 × 8 pdr guns

Impétueux was a 74-gun Téméraire-class ship of the line built for the French Navy during the 1780s. Completed in 1785, she played a minor role in the French Revolutionary Wars.

== Description ==
The Téméraire-class ships had a length of 55.87 metres (183 ft 4 in), a beam of 14.46 metres (47 ft 5 in) and a depth of hold of 7.15 metres (23 ft 5 in). The ships displaced 3,069 tonneaux and had a mean draught of 7.15 metres (23 ft 5 in). They had a tonnage of 1,537 port tonneaux. Their crew numbered 705 officers and ratings during wartime. They were fitted with three masts and ship rigged.

The muzzle-loading, smoothbore armament of the Téméraire class consisted of twenty-eight 36-pounder long guns on the lower gun deck, thirty 18-pounder long guns and thirty 18-pounder long guns on the upper gun deck. On the quarterdeck and forecastle were a total of sixteen 8-pounder long guns. Beginning with the ships completed after 1787, the armament of the Téméraires began to change with the addition of four 36-pounder obusiers on the poop deck (dunette). Some ships had instead twenty 8-pounders.

== Construction and career ==
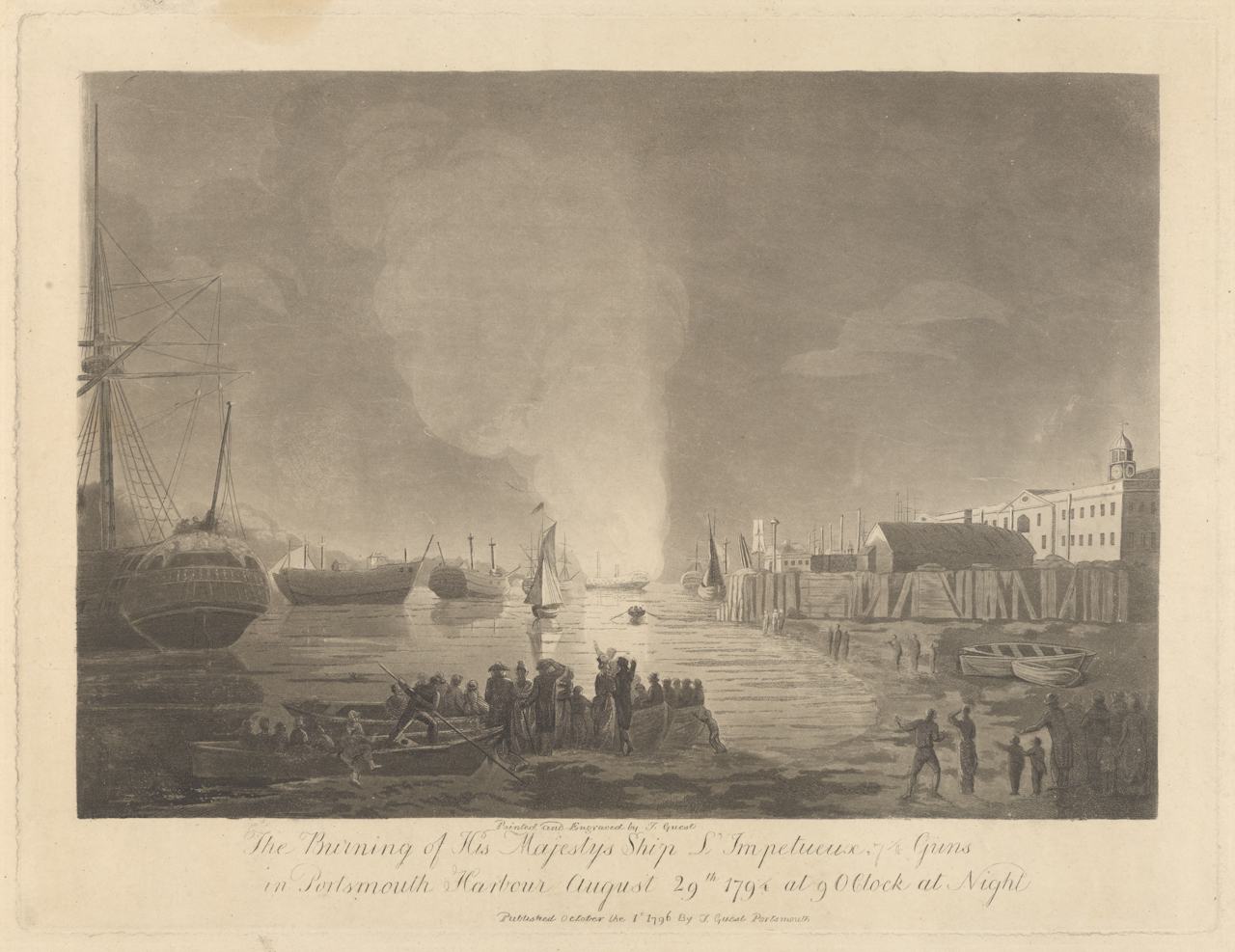
The Burning of His Majesty's Ship L'Impetueux, 71 Guns in Portsmouth Harbour 29 August 1794 at 9 o'Clock at Night

Impétueux was laid down at the Arsenal de Rochefort in 1786 and named on 29 July. The ship was launched on 25 October 1787 and completed in 1788.

She took part in the Glorious First of June in 1794. During the battle, HMS Marlborough became tangled with Impétueux. Badly damaged and on the verge of surrender, Impétueux received a brief reprieve when Mucius appeared through the smoke and collided with both ships. The three entangled ships continued exchanging fire, all suffering heavy casualties with Marlborough and Impétueux losing all three of their masts. This combat continued for several hours. Captain Berkeley of Marlborough had to retire below with serious wounds, and command fell to Lieutenant John Monkton, who signalled for help from the frigates in reserve. Robert Stopford responded in HMS Aquilon (1786), which had the assignment of repeating signals, and towed Marlborough out of the line as Mucius freed herself and made for the regrouped French fleet to the north. Impétueux was in too damaged a state to move at all and sailors from HMS Russell soon seized her.

The Royal Navy intended to take the ship into service as HMS Impetueux, but she was destroyed in an accidental fire at Portsmouth on 24 August 1794 and so was never commissioned. During the Battle of The Glorious First of June, the Royal Navy had also captured her sister ship America, which it renamed HMS Impetueux in 1795.

== Bibliography ==
- Roche, Jean-Michel (2005). Dictionnaire des bâtiments de la flotte de guerre française de Colbert à nos jours [Dictionary of French Warships from Colbert to Today]. Vol. 1: 1671-1870. Roche. ISBN 978-2-9525917-0-6. OCLC 165892922.
- Winfield, Rif and Roberts, Stephen S. (2015) French Warships in the Age of Sail 1786-1861: Design, Construction, Careers and Fates. Seaforth Publishing. ISBN 978-1-84832-204-2
