= Pierre Rolland (military officer) =

French military officer (1772–1848)

Pierre Rolland (8 June 1772 in Montpellier – 27 December 1848 in Paris) was a French military officer. After distinguishing himself in 1809 at the Battle of Wagram as a major in the 2e Régiment de Cuirassiers, he was named a Baron of the First French Empire. His successful command of two legions of cuirassiers during the Battle of Borodino in the French invasion of Russia in 1812 led to his being appointed an Officer of the Legion of Honor on 11 October 1812. In September 1813, he was promoted to the rank of commander after a successful campaign in Dresden. He was promoted to brigadier general the following November after having lost his left leg a month earlier during a battle in Leipzig. He was later awarded the Cross of St. Louis. He left the army in 1816 and died in Paris in 1848.

== Sources ==
- Charles Mullié. Biographie des célébrités militaires des armées de terre et de mer de 1789 à 1850, 1852
