= Louis-Philippe Crépin =

French painter (1772–1851)

Louis-Philippe Crépin (1772 – 26 November 1851) was a French painter who specialised in marine art. Together with Théodore Gudin, he was appointed as one of France's first two Peintres de la Marine in 1830.

== Biography ==
He studied marine painting with Joseph Vernet and landscapes with Hubert Robert. Before that, he had been a sailor with four years of experience as a helmsman and gabier (a seaman in charge of the sails). He had his first exhibit at the Paris in 1796 with "La sortie du port de Brest". He would hold showings there intermittently until 1835.

As early as 1817, he received a letter from the "Ministre de la Marine et des Colonies", Laurent de Gouvion Saint-Cyr, giving him a twenty-year commission to create marine paintings for the government; especially the Ministère de la Marine, where he set up a workshop. This was, however, tempered by a disappointment; the position of painter to the Admiral of France (Louis Antoine, Duke of Angoulême) had gone to Louis Garneray.

At the age of fifty-eight, in part due to a bit of self-promotion, he was appointed as one of the first two official marine painters of the French government. That same year, together with the much younger painters Eugène Isabey and Léon Morel-Fatio, he took part in the Invasion of Algiers. His new position eventually became somewhat ceremonial, as he ceased to exhibit in 1836.

His best known painting is "Combat de la frégate française La Bayonnaise contre la frégate anglaise l’Embuscade 14 décembre 1798", which was commissioned by Napoleon for display at the Tuileries. It was shown at the Salon in 1801. Until 1834, it was hung in the former residence of the Empress at the Château de Saint-Cloud, then was transferred to Versailles by King Louis Philippe I. Since 1935, it has been at the Musée national de la Marine. He also was one of the fourteen artists who contributed to Episodes maritimes, along with Garneray, Gudin, Isabey, Biard and others, who have largely been forgotten.

== Gallery ==
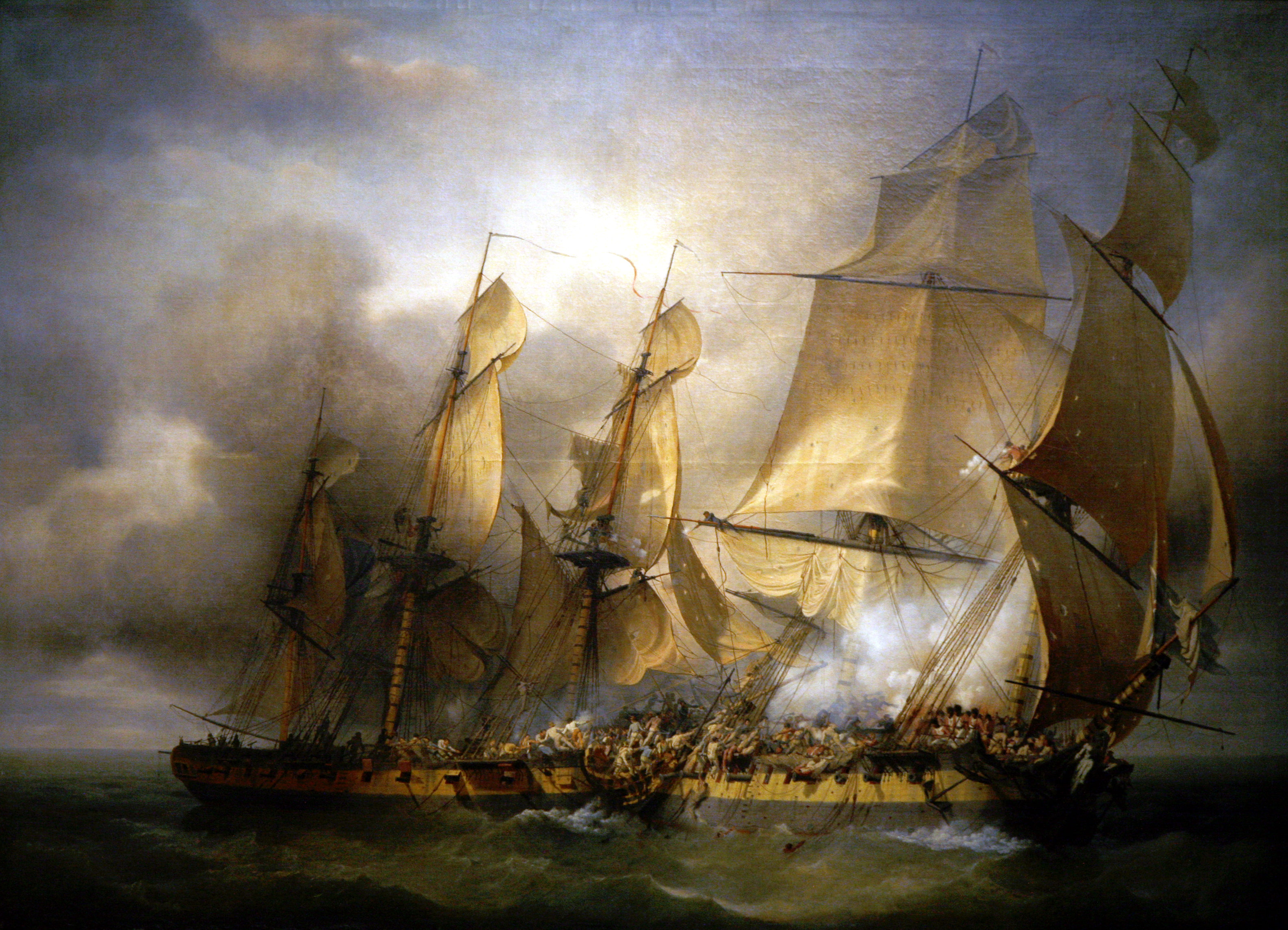
Fight of the Bayonnaise against the Embuscade, 1798 (1801)

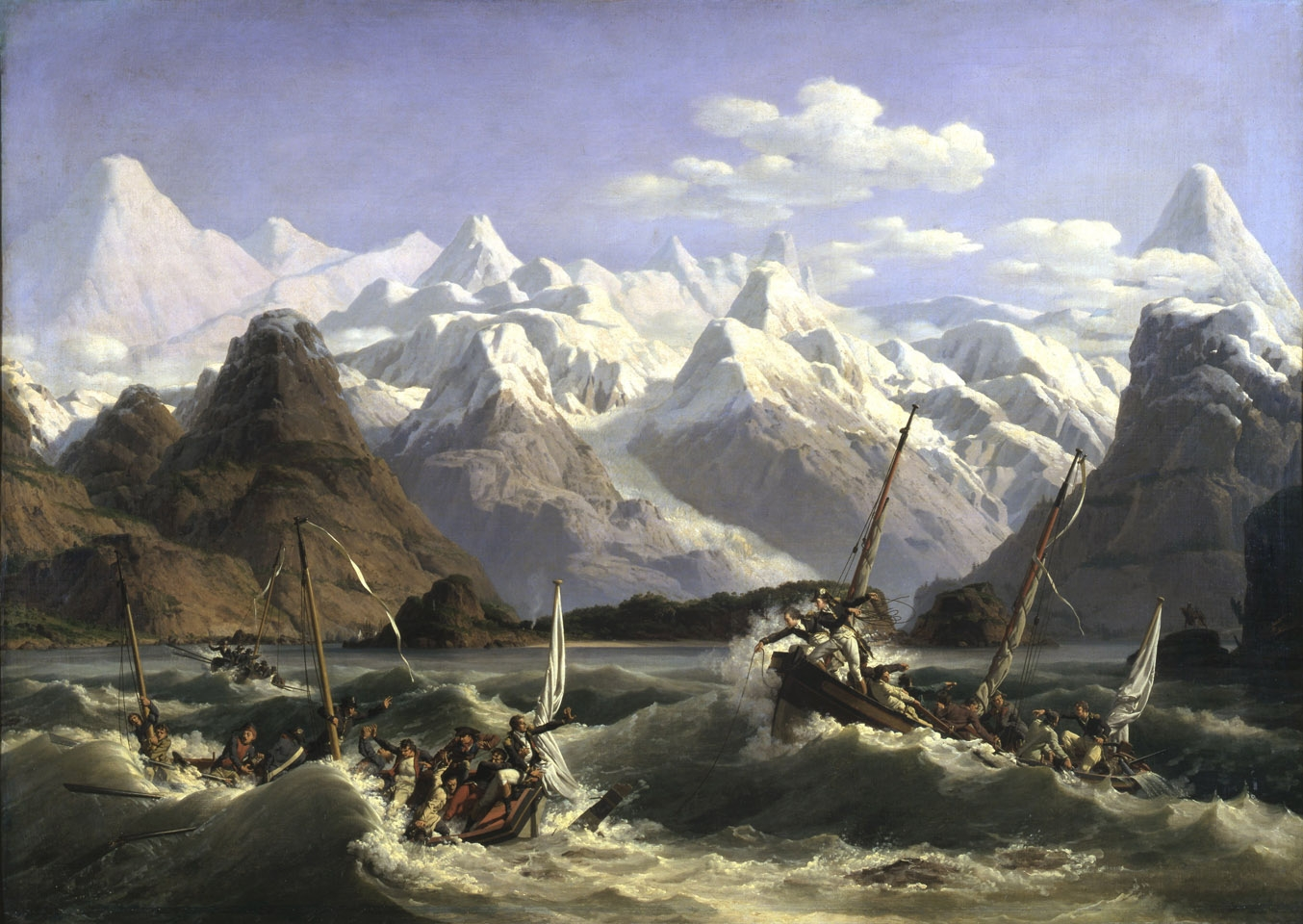
Shipwreck Off the Coast of Alaska (1806)

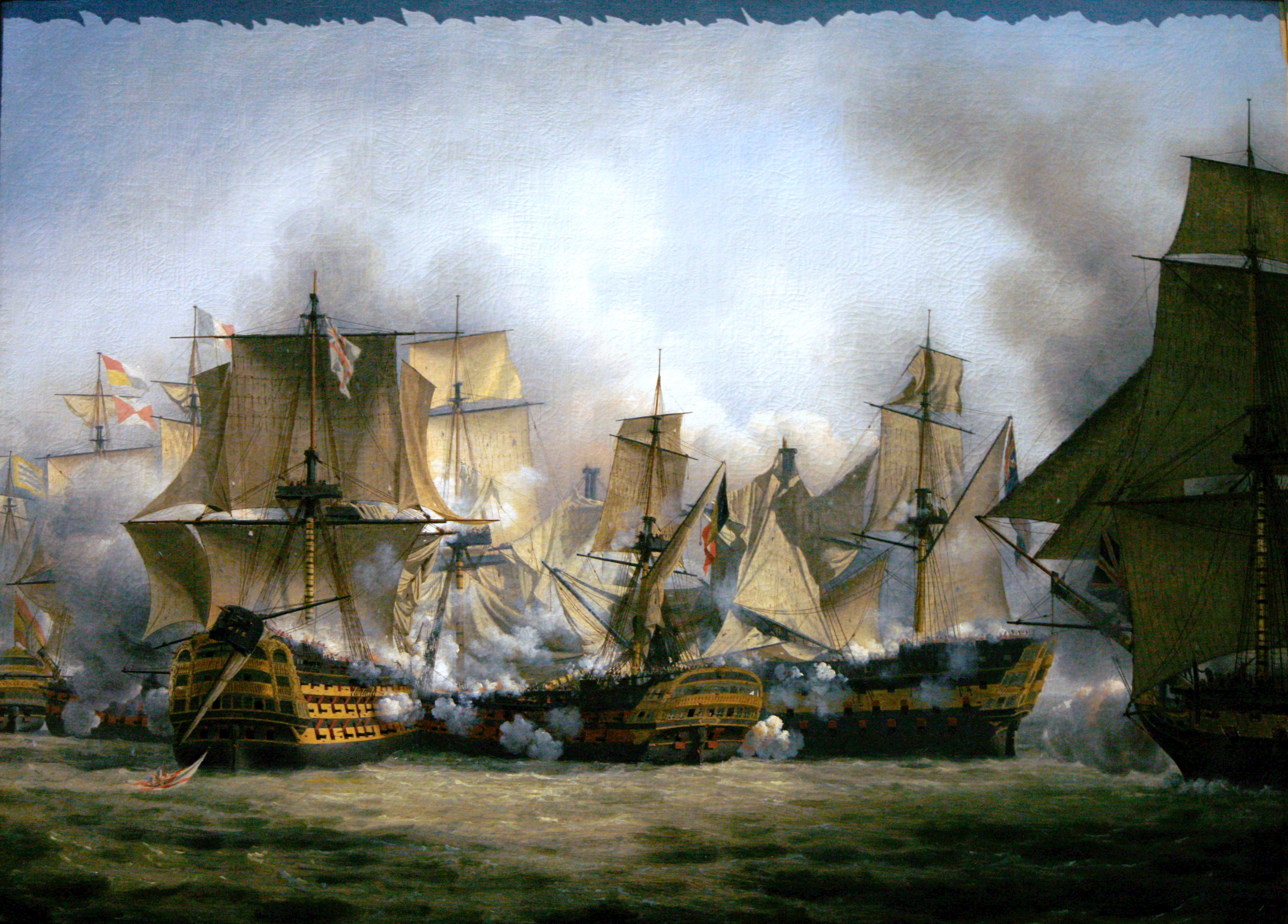
The Redoutable At Trafalgar (1806)

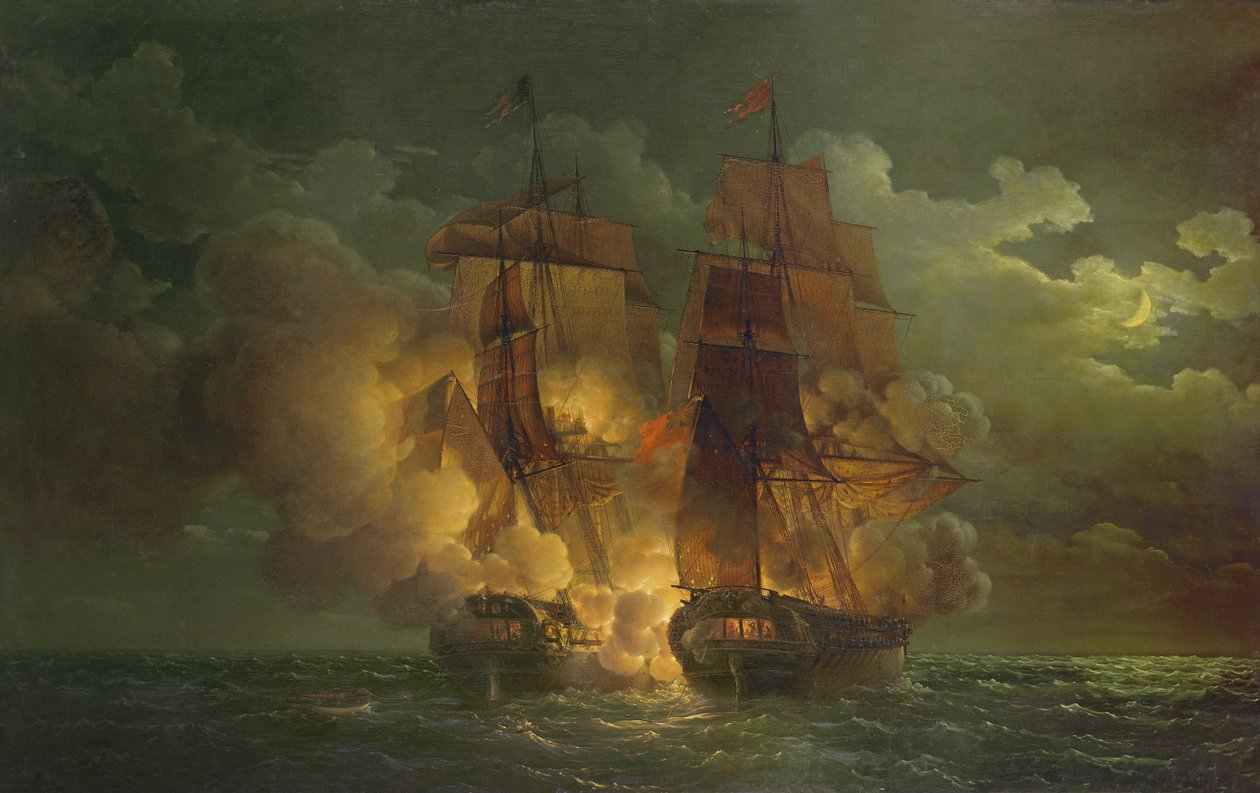
Battle Between the French Frigate 'Arethuse' and the English Frigate 'Amelia' in View of the Islands of Loz, 7 February 1813 (Date unknown)

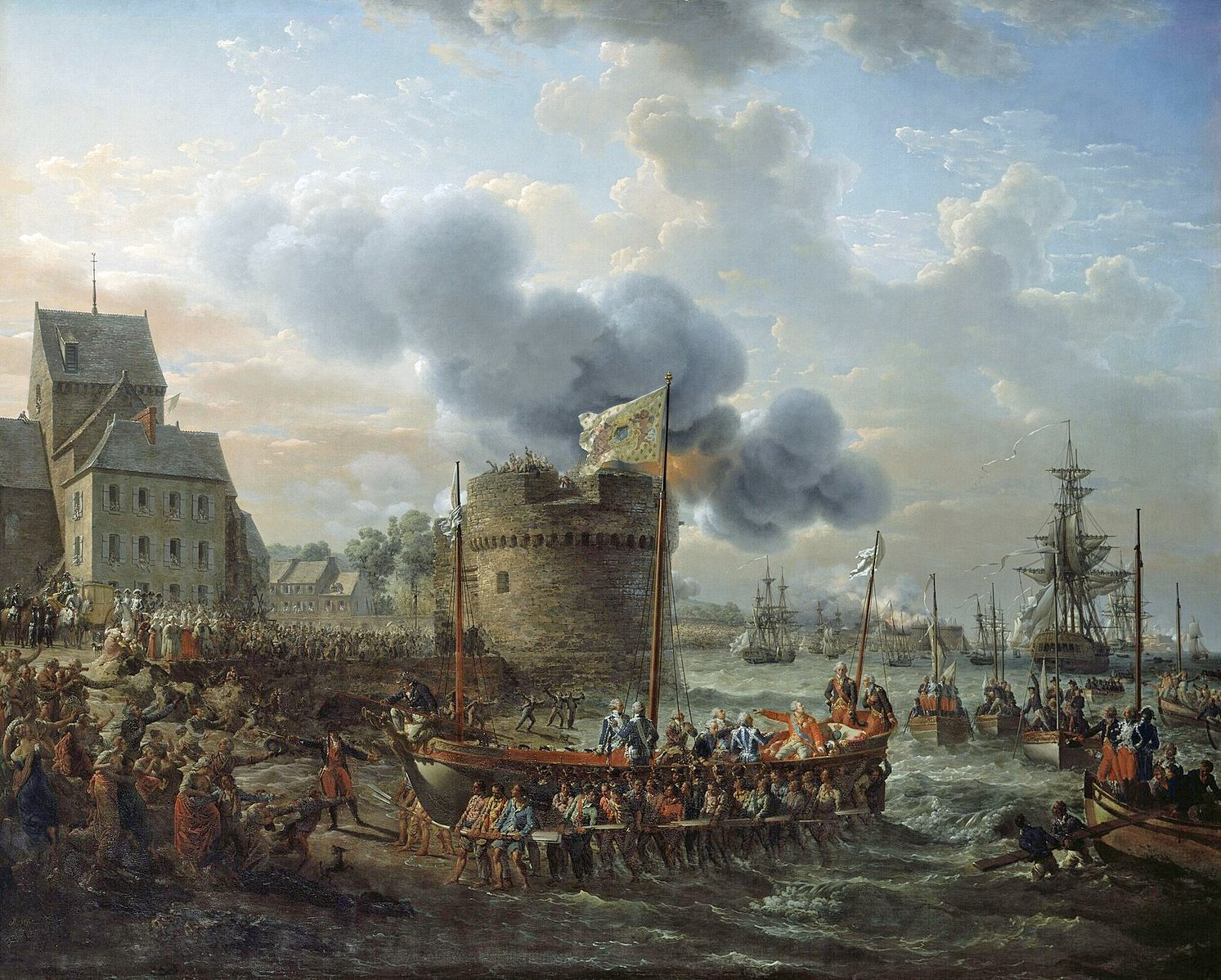
Louis XVI visiting the port of Cherbourg, 23 June 1786 (1817)

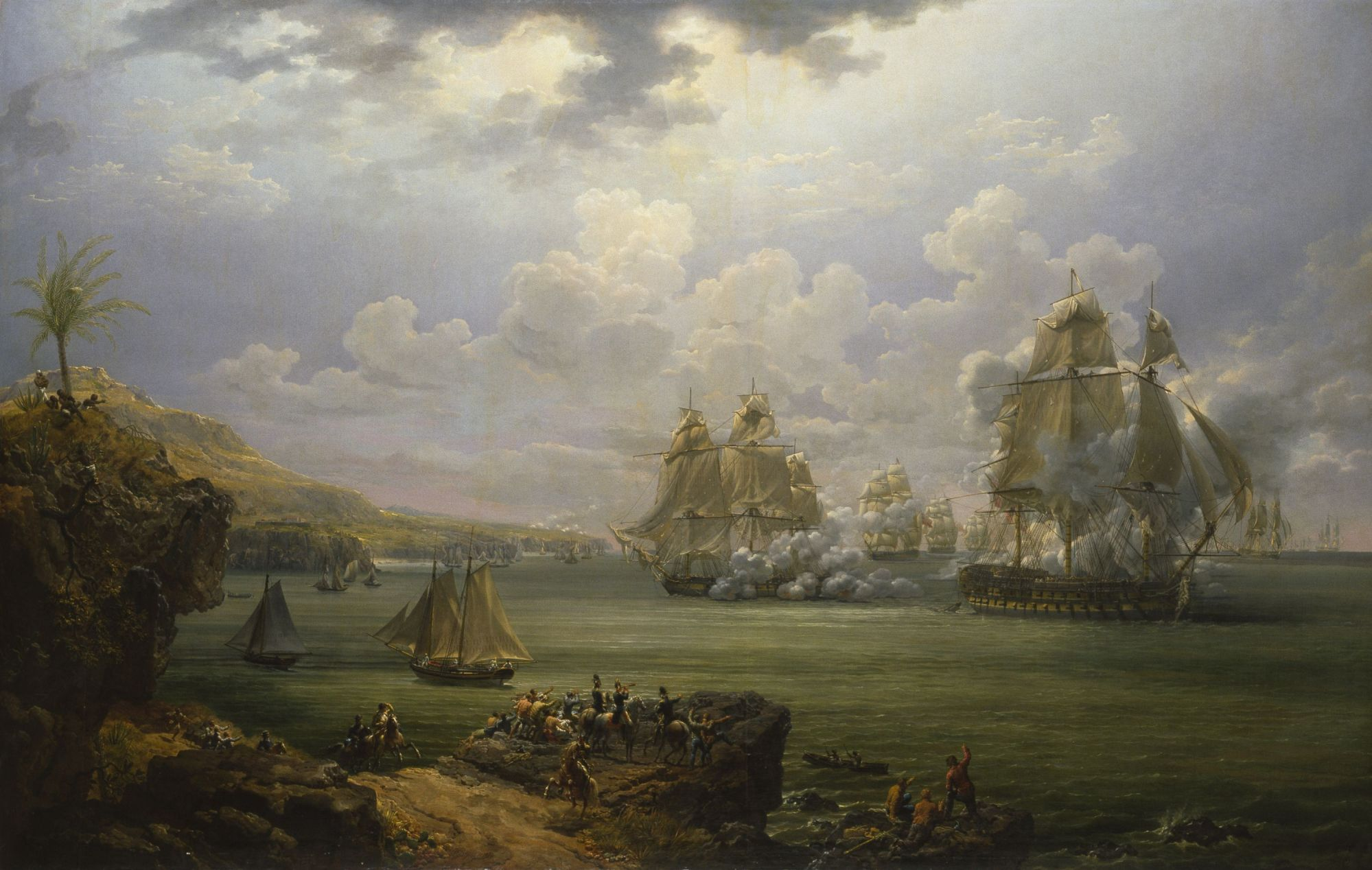
Fight of the Poursuivante against the English ship Hercules, 28 June 1803 (1819)

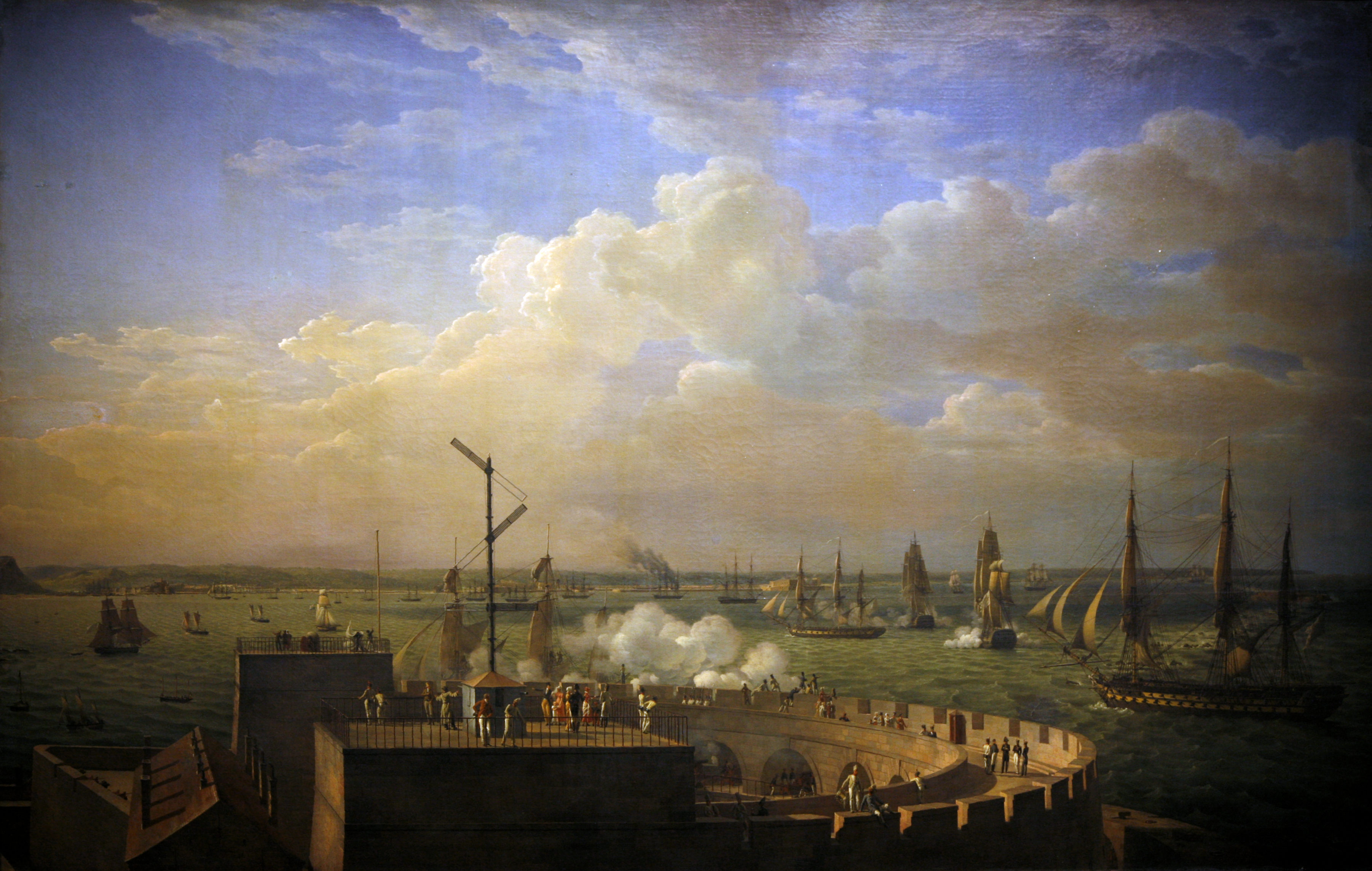
The harbour of Cherbourg (1822)
