= George M'Kinley =

Royal Navy officer, born 1766

Vice-Admiral George M'Kinley
- Born: 1766; Devonport, Plymouth
- Died: 1852 (aged 85–86); Alverstoke, Gosport
- Military career
- Allegiance: Kingdom of Great Britain; United Kingdom
- Branch: Royal Navy
- Rank: Vice-Admiral of the White
- Conflicts: American Revolutionary War; Battle of Fort Royal; Battle of the Chesapeake; Battle of the Saintes; Battle of the Mona Passage; French Revolutionary Wars; Siege of Saint-Florent; Invasion of Corsica; Anglo-Russian Invasion of Holland; Battle of Copenhagen

George M'Kinley (1766–1852) was a Royal Navy officer who served during the American Revolutionary, French Revolutionary and Napoleonic Wars. He joined the navy in 1773 but did not go to sea until 1777. In December 1778, the vessel he was serving on, HMS Ceres, was captured and M'Kinley was a prisoner of war until his exchange the following January. In 1781, M'Kinley was aboard Belliqueux, fighting at the Battle of Fort Royal on 29 April and the Battle of the Capes on 5 September. In January 1782, he was rated lieutenant aboard Barfleur and in April took part in the Battle of the Saintes and the Battle of the Mona Passage.

When war with France resumed in 1793, M'Kinley was sent to the Mediterranean, where, as first lieutenant under Robert Linzee, he took part in operations against Corsica. As a lieutenant, M'Kinley was given command of the 14-gun cutter Liberty in March 1795. Serving in the English Channel, he joined Sir Sidney Smith for an attack on a French squadron near Cap Fréhel and was mentioned in dispatches for his efforts. Promoted to Master and Commander of the 14-gun brig-sloop, Otter on 16 May 1798, M'Kinley was in the task force sent to invade Holland the following year. While serving in the Baltic in 1801, M'Kinley's Otter had a minor role in the Battle of Copenhagen; part of a light division, attached to Lord Nelson's squadron. Soon after, on 20 October, M'Kinley made Post-Captain and on the same day, set sail for the West Indies in his new command HMS Pelican. He remained in American waters until July 1802, serving aboard HMS Abergavenny then HMS Ganges, in which he returned home.

Following the short-lived peace of Amiens, M'Kinley was appointed to HMS Roebuck, a guardship at Leith. It was on board, during a gun drill, where he was temporarily blinded in an explosion and had to be excused from duties for several weeks. In 1807, M'Kinley was operating off Lisbon in HMS Lively and rescued British merchant vessels from the Tagus when French troops threatened the capital. M'Kinley commanded a small squadron off Galicia in 1809, co-operating with the local resistance and aiding in the recapture of Santiago de Compostela. The following year, M'Kinley's ship was wrecked off the coast of Malta but he was cleared of blame by a court martial and returned to duty. Apart from a single trip to the South Atlantic, M'Kinley remained in home waters until the end of his sea service, finally coming ashore in 1817. He rose through the ranks to become Vice Admiral of the White in 1841 and died in 1852.

== Early life and career ==
George M'Kinley was born in Devonport, Plymouth, in 1766. His father and both his brothers were Royal Navy officers who all died during the American Revolutionary War: His father, a lieutenant, when M'Kinley was eleven and his brothers; Samuel in 1780, while in command of HMS Comet on the American Station, and John in 1782, off Hispaniola.

M'Kinley received the patronage of Samuel Barrington and John Leveson Gower and on 5 August 1773, was entered on the books of Gower's ship, HMS Albion, at Portsmouth. In 1777 he joined the 18-gun sloop, HMS Ceres, under James Dacres and was quickly rated able seaman and then midshipman. He was still aboard Ceres when she was captured off St Lucia by the French frigate, Iphigénie on 17 December 1778 and consequently was a prisoner of war until exchanged at the beginning of the 1779.

Following his release, M'Kinley returned to the West Indies where he served on HMS Surprise, HMS Alcmene then Belliqueux in which he fought at the Battle of Fort Royal on 29 April 1781 and the Battle of the Capes on 5 September.

He later joined Barfleur, where it came to the attention of Rear-Admiral Samuel Hood, whose flag she was flying at the time. On 14 January 1782, M'Kinley was made lieutenant of the sloop Stormont, a position he was unable to take up due to the vessel's capture. He therefore remained on Barfleur and was at the Battle of the Saintes, at the beginning of April. While in the Mona Passage, on 19 April, Hood's fleet captured the French ships Jason, Caton, Aimable and recaptured the sloop, Ceres. After the battle, M'Kinley transferred to the 24-gun HMS Champion under Captain Alexander Hood and, in July 1783, sailed for home aboard Aimable.

M'Kinley remained in active service after the war, first on the New Foundland Station in the 14-gun sloop, HMS Thorn and then aboard HMS Edgar, a guardship at Portsmouth. In 1787, M'Kinley was in the 16-gun HMS Trimmer, engaged in the suppression of smuggling along the English coast. He was very nearly given up for dead when, having taken off after a smuggler in the sloop's jolly boat, he was caught in a violent storm and went missing for 30 hours. In 1789, M'Kinley was reunited with Gower, first in HMS Illustrious and later in HMS Formidable.

On 1 December 1792, M'Kinley boarded HMS Alcide as first lieutenant. In February 1793 Britain joined the First Coalition in the French Revolutionary War and in September, Alcide, under Commodore Robert Linzee, took part in operations preceding the Invasion of Corsica.

M'Kinley followed Linzee into the 98-gun HMS Windsor Castle before joining HMS Fortitude, under Captain William Young. On 8 February 1794 as part of the siege of Saint-Florent, Fortitude and Juno, made an unsuccessful attack on the tower at Mortella Point.

== Command ==
As a lieutenant, M'Kinley received his first command, the 14-gun cutter, HMS Liberty, in March 1795, operating in the waters around the Channel Islands. In 1796, M'Kinley came to the attention of Sir Sidney Smith when he offered the services of Liberty and her crew, for an attack on a French squadron that had been chased into the port of Herqui, near Cap Fréhel.

At 12:00 on 18 March, Smith's ship, HMS Diamond, Liberty and a hired lugger named Aristocrat, entered the narrow entrance of the harbour. A party of marines and seamen were put ashore to silence one of the gun batteries while the British vessels engaged the French Corvette, four brigs, two sloops and a lugger, within. Liberty, having a shallower draught than Diamond was able to maintain a close action with the 16-gun corvette. At 22:00, with all the enemy's ships ablaze but the guns ashore still firing, the British withdrew. M'Kinley was mentioned in dispatches for his, "Gallant and judicious manner" in this action.

M'Kinley was promoted to Master and Commander of the 14-gun brig-sloop, Otter on 16 May 1798, taking part in the invasion of Holland the following year. In August, Otter was present at, although she took no active part in, the Vlieter incident; the surrender of a Dutch squadron near Texel. He later commanded a detachment of marines in operations ashore; holding the town of Enkhuizen until the evacuation.

At the Battle of Copenhagen in 1801, M'Kinley's Otter was part of a light division, attached to Lord Nelson's squadron. Immediately after the battle, M'Kinley was placed in temporary command of HMS Bellona, her previous captain, Sir Thomas Boulden Thompson, being incapacitated through the loss of a leg. M'Kinley had just finished refitting the ship when he was appointed another, HMS Ardent; aboard which, he returned to England.

M'Kinley was confirmed Post-Captain on 20 October and, on the same day, sailed for the West Indies aboard HMS Pelican. On arrival, he took up his new position on HMS Abergavenny. In March 1802, Britain signed the Treaty of Amiens and on 23 July, M'Kinley transferred to HMS Ganges, sailing her first to Halifax, Nova Scotia, before heading home.

War resumed in the May following and on 11 July 1803, M'Kinley was appointed to HMS Roebuck, a guardship at Leith. While stationed there, M'Kinley was temporarily blinded by an exploding powder horn during a gun drill. He returned to duty some weeks later, when Roebuck took up her new position in the Yarmouth Roads.

On 23 January 1806, M'Kinley took command of HMS Quebec off the Dutch coast. He transferred to HMS Lively 20 May. In 1807, when Lisbon came under threat from French troops under Jean-Andoche Junot, Lively was tasked with the evacuation of a British factory and the removal of British merchant vessels, moored in the river Tagus. In 1809, with a small squadron under his command, M'Kinley operated off the coast of Galicia, where he supported local guerrilla groups. Such alliances resulted in the surrender of French forces first at Marin and later in Vigo on 27 March, and the recapture of the city of Santiago de Compostela on 3 July.

Admiralty-Ofiice, March 28, 1809

Extrac of a Letter from Captain Mc Kinley, of His Majesty Ship Livety Shiply, to the Hon. W.W. Pole dated Villa García March 15, 1809

...

'The inlets to Villa Garcia and Marin'. Surveyed by P W [Peter Wright] Gawthorp, Master of HMS Lively, by order of George M'Kinley, April 1809

On the 9th a Party of Eighty Infantry and Four Cavalry, under the Command of Three Officer from Pontevedra, entered Marin, but a Fire being opened on them from this Ship, and the Plover, and the Carronade from the Launch, they made a most precipitate Retreat; the Commanding Officer on a good Horse, and the Four Cavalry benefiting by their being mounted, left their Cormnpauions, who outrunning their Officers, a Captain and Lieutenant fell into the Hands of the Spaniards, who delivered them to me. It is with the most heartfelt. Satisfaction, that I can with Confidence afford their Lordships that the Spirit of the Galicians is arounded to the most enthusiastic Ardour, governed by a cool determined Courage, which the Feelings of Loyalty and Patriotism naturally inspire, and they confidently look for Aid to the Generosity of the British Government speedily to succour them with Aims and Ammunition to enable them to succeed in the glorious and just Cause which they have undertaken, to expel the perfidious Invaders of their Country.

Lively was wrecked off Malta in 1810, M'Kinley and his crew having worked for 8 weeks to try to salvage her. A court martial acquitted M'Kinley of blame and commended him for his efforts.

On 19 April 1811, M'Kinley took the position of flag captain to Sir Charles Cotton, aboard HMS San Josef. Following the retirement of Lord Gambier, Cotton was given command of the Channel Fleet and San Josef and M'Kinley went with him.

M'Kinley was appointed to HMS Bellona on 5 May 1812, initially cruising off the mouth of the Scheldt before being sent to St Helena. On his return, he served in the Channel, where he saw out the remainder of the war. M'Kinley came ashore in 1817, having spent an almost unbroken period of 33 years at sea; twenty-two in command.

== Later career and death ==
On 16 January 1818, M'Kinley took up a position at the Royal Greenwich Hospital. On its amalgamation with the Royal Naval Asylum in April 1821, he was nominated Superintendent and rewarded for his services with a special pay increase in 1828. M'Kinley was promoted Rear-Admiral of the Blue on 13 October 1830 and Vice Admiral of the White on 23 November 1841. He died in Alverstoke in 1852.
