= Kersaint =

Kersaint may refer to:

- The family Coëtnempren de Kersaint, among whom:
  - Guy François Coëtnempren de Kersaint (1703—1759), French Navy officer and admiral
  - Joseph Coëtnempren de Kersaint (1746—1797), French Navy officer, son of Guy François de Kersaint
  - Armand de Kersaint (1742–1793), French Navy officer and politician, son of Guy François de Kersaint
  - Guy Pierre Kersaint (1747–1822), French Navy officer, son of Guy François de Kersaint
- Kersaint-Plabennec, a commune in the Finistère department of Brittany in northwestern France
- French ship Kersaint, several French warships
