= Orénoque =

1780s ship

Orénoque by one account was a French privateer sloop commissioned in French Guiana in 1781. Another account has her as a Dutch merchant vessel purchased into service. If so, she may have been one of the vessels that some British privateers captured during the raid on Essquinbo and Demerara in late February 1781. The French captured her in 1782 when they captured Demerara; they disposed of her in 1784 or so.

== Career ==
The British took her into service as HMS Oronoque, and commissioned her under Commander William Tahourdin. (Note: The National Maritime Museum's database spells her name as Ornonoque.) By one report, Orénoque had been a Dutch merchant vessel, and at the time of commissioning had only five men aboard, of whom three were prisoners - a murderer, a thief of naval stores, and a Dutchman.

About one year later, in January–February 1782, French captain Armand de Kersaint led a flotilla in Iphigénie that included two more frigates, four brigs, and a large cutter to recapture Demerara and Essequibo. Tahourdin commanded a small squadron that also included two small sloops, HMS Barbuda and Sylph, and two small brig-sloops, Rodney and Stormont. The French were sighted on 30 January and Tarhoudin moved his squadron downriver. However, the French landed troops and as these moved towards Demerara, the British forces facing them retreated, forcing Tahourdin to pull back his vessels also. On 1 February the British asked for terms of capitulation, with the actual capitulation taking place on 3 February. In capturing the colonies de Kersaint also captured Tahourdin's squadron, of which Oronoque was the largest, but most feeble vessel. At the time of her surrender Oronoque was armed with ten 9-pounder guns on her lower deck, and eleven 2 and 3-pounder guns, for which there was no ammunition. Even the 9-pounders were short of ordnance stores. She also only had a crew of 20 men aboard.

Tahourdin as commander of the British squadron was a co-signer of the capitulation with Robert Kingston, the Lieutenant-Governor of the colony. Despite the capitulation, Tahourdin was promoted to post captain on 23 January 1783.

== Fate ==
The French then took Oronoque into naval service as Vicomte de Damas. Vicomte de Damas, of 18 guns and four swivel guns, was put up for sale at Honfleur in April 1784. In October she was at Havre, not yet sold.
