= HMS Barbuda (1780) =

Sloop of the Royal Navy

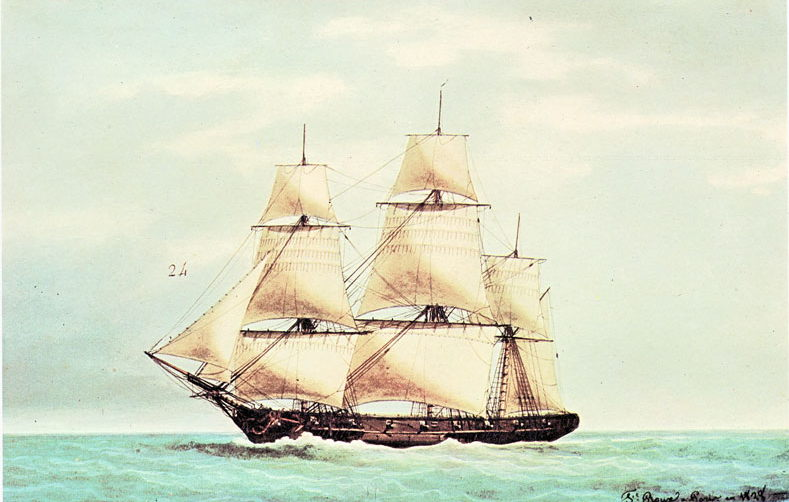
- Watercolour portrait of Légère, by François Roux, commissioned by Willaumez.

History

Massachusetts
- Name: Charming Sally
- Captured: c.1779

Great Britain
- Name: HMS Barbuda
- Namesake: Barbuda
- Acquired: 1780 by purchase of a prize
- Commissioned: 11 December 1780
- Captured: February 1782

France
- Name: Barboude
- Operator: French Navy
- Acquired: 1782 by capture
- Fate: Sold 1786

France
- Name: Inabordable
- Operator: Private parties
- Acquired: 1786 by purchase
- Fate: Sold May 1793

France
- Name: Légère
- Operator: French Navy
- Acquired: 1793 by purchase
- Captured: June 1796

Great Britain
- Name: Legere
- Acquired: June 1796 by capture and subsequent purchase
- Commissioned: November 1797
- Fate: Wrecked 2 February 1801

General characteristics
- Displacement: 600 tons (French; Légère)
- Tons burthen: HMS Barbuda:319 (bm); HMS Legere: 453 17/94 (bm)
- Length: 116 ft 2 1/2 in (35.4 m) (gundeck); 94 ft 8 in (28.9 m) (keel)
- Beam: 30 ft 0 in (9.1 m)
- Depth of hold: 9 ft 7 1/2 in (2.9 m)
- Sail plan: Sloop
- Complement: Légère; Originally: 236; At capture: 168; HMS Legere:121
- Armament: HMS Barbuda:4 × 9-pounder + 12 × 12-pounder guns; Barboude: 20 × 9-pounder (French) + 6 × 6-pounder (French); Inabordable: 16 × 6-pounder + 4 × 4-pounder guns; Légère; At capture: 22 × 9-pounder guns; HMS Legere; Upper deck (UD): 16 × 6-pounder guns; QD: 6 × 12-pounder carronades; Fc: 2 × 12-pounder carronades; Later; UD: 16 × 18-pounder carronades; QD: 6 × 18-pounder carronades; Fc: 2 × 6-pounder chase guns + 2 × 18-pounder carronades
- Notes: The discrepancy in burthen between HMS Barbuda on the one hand, and HMS Legere on the other is large, and unexplained. French records for the burthen equivalent for Barboude and Légère are consistent with the burthen for Barbuda. However, the burthen for HMS Legere are consistent with those calculated from her stated dimensions (c.470).

HMS Barbuda was commissioned into the Royal Navy in 1780 after having briefly served as an American privateer. Barbuda was one of the two sloops that captured Demerara and Essequibo in 1781, but the French Navy captured her there in 1782 and took her into service as Barboude. The French Navy sold her to private owners in 1786, and she served briefly as a privateer in early 1793 before the French Navy purchased her again and named her Légère. She served them until mid-1796 when the Royal Navy captured her and took her into service as HMS Legere. She was wrecked off the coast of Colombia, without loss of life, in February 1801.

== Charming Sally ==
British records state that HMS Barbuda was the Massachusetts vessel Charming Sally. HMS Boreas sent Charming Sally into English Harbour, Antigua in November 1780. Charming Sally does not appear to have belonged to the Massachusetts Naval Militia. Nor was she the Massachusetts privateer Charming Sally that participated in the disastrous, for the Americans, Penobscot Expedition and whose crew had to scuttle her on 14 August 1779 to prevent the British capturing her. The name Barbuda suggests that the vessel was captured in the West Indies. It is also suggestive of a name other than Charming Sally, one that was either that of an existing British warship, or one honouring an American leader or battle victory.

== HMS Barbuda ==
The Royal Navy commissioned Barbuda on 11 December 1780 under Commander Francis Pender.

On 27 February 1781 Barbuda and HMS Surprize, which Admiral Lord Rodney had sent from St Eustatius, appeared at Demerara. In March, the sloops accepted the surrender of "Colony of Demarary and the River Essequebo". Shortly before they arrived, six British privateers had raided Essequibo and Demerara, captured sixteen Dutch ships, and forced the de facto surrender of the colonies. When Barbuda and Surprize arrived there were still four vessels (two Dutch and two American) at Demerara, and 11 vessels (Dutch and Spanish) at Essequibo.

On 3 February 1782 a squadron of five French ships led by the frigate Iphigénie captured Demerara and Essequibo. The French were sighted on 30 January and Commander William Tarhoudin, the senior naval officer, moved his squadron downriver. However, the French landed troops and as these moved towards Demerara, the British forces facing them retreated, forcing Tarhoudin to pull back his vessels also. On 1 February the British asked for terms of capitulation, with the actual capitulation taking place on 3 February. The French seized six vessels of the Royal Navy: the 20-gun Orinoque (Commander William Tahourdin), 16-gun Barbuda, 18-gun Sylph (Commander Lawrence Graeme), 16-gun Stormont (Commander Christmas Paul), and 16-gun brig Rodney (Lieutenant John Douglas Brisbane).

Rodney was furious that six British "frigates" and a fort had surrendered to five French ships. The subsequent court martial of the captains exonerated all, and Tahourdin, Pender, and Paul went on to achieve post rank. (Note: Tahourdin's promotion is dated 20 January 1783, Pender's is dated 1 December 1787, and Paul's is dated 11 November 1794. All three went on to become admirals. Brisbane drowned in September 1782 when the newly-captured Ville de Paris foundered in a storm. Another account has Graeme as a passenger on Ville de Paris, returning home from Jamaica, and drowning on 30 April, which date is incorrect.)

== French peacetime service ==
The French Navy took Barbuda into service as Barboude. The Navy then sold her in 1786 at Brest, where she became the merchantman Inabordable; at the start of the French Revolutionary Wars she served for a few months as a privateer. In May 1793 the Navy re-acquired her at Havre and in June named her Légère.

== French corvette ==
Between 22 September and 8 January 1794 she was under the command of lieutenant de vaisseau Carpentier jr. She sailed between Hougue roads and Cherbourg, Brest and Cherbourg, and escorted a convoy from Cherbourg to Saint Malo. apparently, in December 1793 she was caught in a storm off Cherbourg and grounded on the Contentin peninsula in Normandy. (Note: Some records indicate that she was wrecked.) Still, clearly the French Navy refloated her.

Between 13 January 1794 and 18 November, Carpentier remained in command and between 14 January and 20 August Légère escorted convoys between Barfleur and Brest.

Between 29 December and 29 May 1795 Légère was initially at Brest. She then participated in the Croisière du Grand Hiver. She returned to Brest, and then cruised off Cap Ortegal. Carpentier then sailed her to Groix, and back to Brest.

Légère left Brest on 4 June 1796 in company with three frigates. During her cruise she had captured six prizes. She was still under Carpentier's command.

On 23 June, HMS Apollo and HMS Doris captured Légère, of twenty-two 9-pounder guns and 168 men. The two British frigates encountered her at 48°30′N 8°28′W. After a 10-hour chase the British frigates finally caught up with her; a few shots were exchanged and then Légère, outnumbered and outgunned, struck. The Navy took into her service as HMS Legere.

== HMS Legere ==
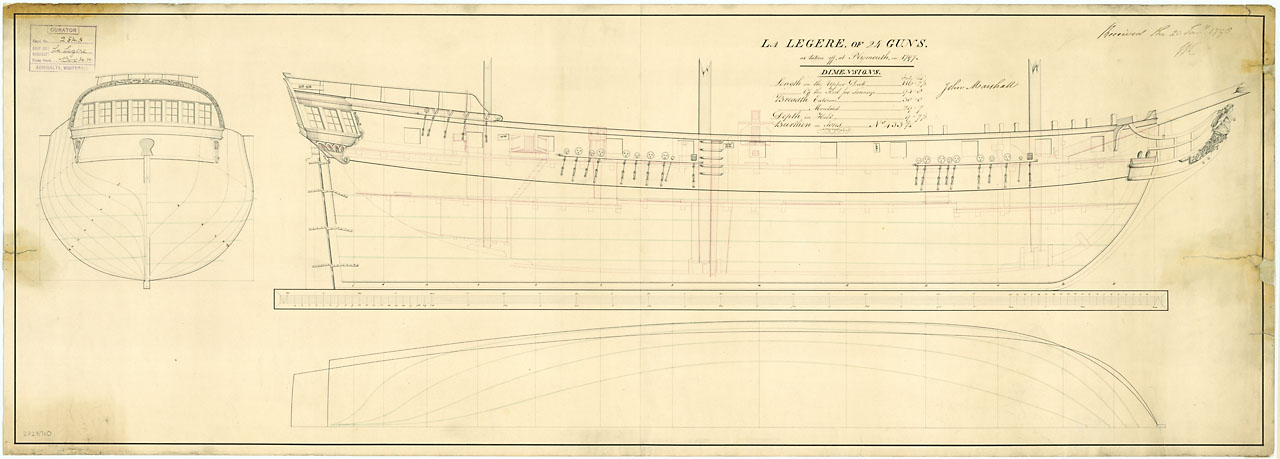
Legere as drawn in 1796

The Royal Navy commissioned Legere in November 1797 under Commander Joshua Watson. Commander Cornelius Quinton replaced Watson in March 1798 and next month sailed for Jamaica.

On 18 November 1799 USS Constitution made contact with an unidentified American merchant schooner that had been captured by a French privateer at (26°20′N 70°00′W) and then recaptured by Legere at (20°20′N 67°40′W), (dates unknown), she was being sent to Jamaica for adjudication.

On 13 December 1799 Legere recaptured the brig Mercury.

In January or February 1800, Legere captured the 2-gun privateer Petite Victoire. She had a crew of 52 men and was sailing in ballast. Legere shared the proceeds of the capture with Pelican. She also shared in the proceeds of Pelican's capture of the privateer Actif.

Between 1 March 1800 and 19 May, Legere captured three vessels:

- a Spanish schooner, which was sailing from Maracaibo to Curacoa with a cargo of fustic;
- a Dutch schooner sailing from "Acquin" to Curacoa with coffee; and,
- a Spanish felucca carrying cocoa.

Legere captured two more schooners after that. On 20 May she captured the Aurora. Then on 19 August Leger captured a schooner of unknown name.

== Fate ==
Legere was wrecked near Cartagena, Colombia, on 2 February 1801. She had been cruising off the coast when the weather worsened and the waves broke over her. Her pumps kept up until about 2a.m. when a wave loosened a plank and she started to fill with water. Quinton sailed towards land as the crew threw guns, stores, and an anchor overboard to lighten her. At 3p.m. she anchored in "Samba Bay" (or "Jamba Bay"), east of Cartagena. (Note: One source suggests that the wrecking took place on Palmarita Shoal, some 12 leagues east of Cartagena at 10°51.45′N 76°16.25′W. However there are two difficulties with this information. First, the court martial records make clear she flooded from storm damage, not grounding. Second, the admittedly rough coordinates are west of Cartagena, and some distance out.) She was clearly sinking so her crew set fire to her and took to her boats. After six days the boats reached Cartagena. There the British became prisoners of war.

On 8 July 1801 at Jamaica the customary court martial acquitted Captain Quinton, his officers, and crew of the loss of Legere.
