= HMS Stormont (1781) =

Sloop of the Royal Navy

History

Great Britain
- Name: HMS Stormont
- Acquired: February 1781 by purchase of a prize

History

France
- Name: Stormont
- Acquired: February 1782 by capture
- Fate: Broken up c.1786

General characteristics
- Tons burthen: 175 (bm)
- Length: Overall:80 ft 0 in (24.4 m); Keel:50 ft 2 in (15.3 m)
- Beam: 23 ft 7 in (7.2 m)
- Depth of hold: 10 ft 0 in (3.0 m)
- Sail plan: Brig-sloop
- Complement: 100
- Armament: RN: 14 × 4-pounder guns; French Navy" 16 × 4 or 6-pounder guns

HMS Stormont was the highly successful American privateer General Pickering, which Admiral Rodney's British fleet captured on 3 February 1781 at the capture of Sint Eustatius. She was one of nine captured American vessels that the British sent to Antigua a few days later to be assessed for possible purchase. The Royal Navy purchased General Pickering on 14 February and Commander Nicholas Charrington commissioned her in the Leeward Islands for service as HM Sloop Stormont. Commander Christmas Paul replaced Charrington.

Lieutenant George M'Kinley was made lieutenant into Stormont on 14 January 1782, but the French captured her before he could join her.

In January–February 1782, French captain Armand de Kersaint led a flotilla in Iphigénie that included two more frigates, four brigs, and a large cutter to recapture Demerara and Essequibo. The small British squadron there consisted of Stormont, HMS Barbuda, Sylph, and Rodney, the squadron being under the command of Commander William Tahourdin in Oronoque. The French were sighted on 30 January and Tarhoudin moved his squadron downriver. However, the French landed troops and as these moved towards Demerara, the British forces facing them retreated, forcing Tahourdin to pull back his vessels also. On 1 February the British asked for terms of capitulation, with the actual capitulation taking place on 3 February. In capturing the colonies de Kersaint also captured Tahourdin's squadron.

The French took Stormont into service under her existing name. A key source reports that she was broken up at Rochefort in 1786, and another that she was struck from the lists in that year. However, an article in The Times (of London) dated November 1787 showed her still in service at Rochfort.
