= List of wars involving Guyana =

This is a list of wars and conflicts involving Guyana from the Colonial era to the Modern era.

- Cassard expedition (1712)
- Berbice slave uprising (1763–1764)
- Fourth Anglo-Dutch War (1780)
- Capture of Demerara and Essequibo – 1782 – American Revolutionary War
- Demerara rebellion of 1823
- World War II (1939–1945)
- Rupununi Uprising (1969)

== Sources ==
- Hartsinck, Jan Jacob (1770). Beschryving van Guiana, of de wilde kust in Zuid-America [Description of Guiana, or the wild coast of South America] (in Dutch). p. 299 – via Digital Library for Dutch Literature.
