= HMS Pitt (1805) =

History

United Kingdom
- Name: HMS Pitt
- Acquired: by purchase 1805
- Renamed: HMS Sandwich in 1806
- Fate: Broken up September 1809

General characteristics
- Type: Schooner
- Propulsion: Sails
- Sail plan: Schooner
- Complement: 45
- Armament: Initially: 12 × 12-pounder carronades; Later: 10 × 18-pounder carronades + 2 × 6-pounder chase guns

HMS Pitt was the mercantile schooner William and Mary, which the Admiralty bought in 1805. Pitt served briefly on the Jamaica station during the Napoleonic Wars. She participated in one notable single-ship action in which she prevailed, and captured several other vessels. The Admiralty renamed her Sandwich before having her broken up in 1809.

== Service ==
When the Admiralty purchased William and Mary, it apparently was on the understanding that Lieutenant Michael Fitton, formerly of Abergavenny, would command her. He contributed £437 to her purchase from his own pocket, her price being above what the Admiralty had allocated.

The Admiralty commissioned Pitt in 1806 under Fitton’s command. She was registered on 15 August 1806 and named Sandwich, but remained known as Pitt on the Jamaica station.

On 6 June 1806 Pitt captured George.

On 23 October Pitt was anchored in Môle-Saint-Nicolas at the north-west end of the island of Haiti. Towards evening a lookout sighted two sails, with it looking like one was pursuing the other. Because the weather was calm, they were moving slowly. Fitton weighed anchor and with his crew at the sweeps set out in pursuit. In the morning he spotted three schooners, the largest of which appeared to be a privateer. As Pitt approached the privateer fired her 6-pounders but without effect because of the distance. The three schooners continued to make their way towards the port of Baracoa, Cuba, some 70 miles west. Pitt's crew manned their sweeps throughout the night though at dawn a breeze gave them a respite. They caught up with the privateer outside Baracoa. She had sent her two prizes into the port and was awaiting the British.

Fitton was able to maneuver Pitt so that she was between the privateer and the port, thereby cutting the privateer off from her refuge. At four in the afternoon Pitt was close enough to the privateer to commence an action that lasted a little over half an hour before the privateer sailed away towards Ochoa. The night was still and Pitt's crew effected repairs and returned to the sweeps. In all, they spent some 50 hours at the sweeps.

Late next morning, on 26 October, Pitt caught up with the privateer. Unable to escape, the privateer’s captain ran her ashore. Some four to five hours earlier, Drake, under the command of Robert Nicholas, had come in sight and maneuvered to block the privateer's escape, but did not herself enter into the combat. The privateer lowered her boats and her captain and all but the mortally wounded among her crew were able to get to shore. Drake then assisted Pitt in hauling off the privateer.

The privateer turned out to be Superbe. Superbe was armed with 14 guns, two 9 (or 8)-pounders and twelve 6-pounders, and had a crew of 94 men under the command of M. Dominique Houx. (Note: Subsequent accounts such as James's, give the French captain’s name as Dominique Diron.) Houx (or Diron), was a highly successful privateer captain. A list on Superbe showed that she had captured vessels whose value amounted to £147,000.

Pitt suffered two men seriously and six men lightly wounded. On Superbe the boarding party from Pitt found four men dead and three mortally wounded. Reports suggest that the French suffered 14 dead in all and many wounded, who had escaped. Nicholas suggested that Fitton write his official letter describing the action. Fitton had been on deck for 67 hours and declined, saying he was too exhausted and asking Nicholas to write it in his stead. Fitton received a sword valued at £50 from the Lloyd's Patriotic Fund, and his share of the prize-money. (Note: A first-class share of the head money for Superbe was worth £138 9s 1½d; a fifth-class share, that of a seaman, was worth £1 9s 9¼d. Prize money would have been additional but does not appear in the London Gazette.) Earlier that same month Superbe had encountered and tried to board Peterel off Charleston in an inconclusive skirmish with casualties on both sides.

On 13 April 1807, Pitt captured the Spanish armed schooner Abeja, which was carrying a cargo of cocoa. Then one week later, she captured the French privateer Fou Fou. Fou Fou was armed with one gun and had a crew of 43 men. She was four days out of San Domingo and had made no captures.

Diron, who had been captain of Superbe, equipped a brig that he named Revanche de la Superbe, and sent an invitation to Fitton to meet him at a place named; but before the message arrived the 40-year-old Fitton had been superseded as captain by the 17-year-old Thomas John Cochrane, son of Admiral Sir Alexander Cochrane, who was then commanding officer of the Leeward Islands station. (Note: Despite his notable victory over Superbe, and his earlier notable career, Lieutenant Fitton did not receive a promotion. Not only did he lack a powerful patron but there is some suggestion that he may, by injudicious conduct early in his naval career, have made a powerful enemy.)

On 11 May 1807 Lieutenant Edward Bust took command of Sandwich. His replacement on 1 April 1808 was Lieutenant-Commander Edward Henry A'Court. On 10 June 1808 he was confirmed in command of the receiving ship Shark, which was a hulk in Port Royal harbor.

By late 1808 command of Sandwich had passed to Lieutenant W.J. Foley. In December Foley and Sandwich were involved in a minor diplomatic incident in Savannah, Georgia. Foley and a midshipman had come ashore to deliver dispatches to the British consul in the port. While they were at dinner, a Captain Armstrong of the U.S. Artillery arrived, took them into custody, escorted them back to Sandwich, and ordered Foley to take Sandwich back out to sea.

The reason for the expulsion was that they had violated President Thomas Jefferson's proclamation prohibiting foreign armed vessels from entering American ports. English newspapers pointed out that the President's proclamation specifically exempted vessels bearing dispatches. (Note: President Jefferson’s proclamation may have been in response to the Leander affair in 1806, or the Chesapeake-Leopard Affair in 1807.)

== Fate ==
Sandwich was repaired in July and August 1809 but then sold for breaking up in September.
