= HMS Gipsy (1799) =

British naval schooner 1799–1804

History

Great Britain
- Name: HMS Gipsy
- Acquired: 1799
- Fate: Disposed of in 1804

General characteristics
- Sail plan: Schooner
- Complement: 42
- Armament: 10 × 4-pounder guns

HMS Gipsy (or Gipsey) was a schooner in service as a ship's tender to several flagships in the Caribbean between 1799 and 1804. In that service she captured several French privateers.

Although there is information on her service history, there is no information extant on her origins, fate, burthen, or other dimensions.

== Career ==
On 22 April 1800, the tender Gipsey, Lieutenant Tippett, commanding, captured the French privateer schooner Innocent, of two guns and 37 men. Innocent, of Guadaloupe, had left Pointe Pitre on a privateering cruise.

On 7 June, Gipsey, captured the French privateer schooner Volante, of one gun, small arms, and ten men. Volante, of Guadaloupe, had left Guadaloupe on a privateering cruise.

On 30 June the tenders Gipsy and Pickle captured the French privateer schooner Fidelle (probably Fidèle), which was armed with four guns and had a crew of 61 men. She was from Guadeloupe and on a privateering cruise when the two British vessels captured her.

On 7 October Gipsey was serving as a tender to Leviathan, and was under the command of Lieutenant Corydon Boger. Admiral J.T.Duckworth, Commander-in-Chief at Barbados and the Leeward Islands Station, had ordered Gipsey to convoy the merchant ship Charlotte northward of "the islands". As Gipsey was passing Guadaloupe she encountered a French sloop. A single ship action ensued that persisted for several hours before the sloop struck. She proved to be Quid pro Quo, of eight 6 & 9-pounder guns and 98 men, 80 of whom were chasseurs and cannoneers from Guadeloupe. In the action, Gipsey had one man killed and 11 wounded, including Boger. Two or five of the wounded died later of their wounds. The French had four men killed including Captain Tourpié, formerly a capitaine de fregate in the French navy, and 11 wounded. Charlotte assisted Gipsey with the casualties and the prisoners. Boger put into St John's to get the wounded into hospital and to effect repairs, both Gipsey and Quiproquo having sustained damage to their rigging. (Note: Quiproquo (meaning "misunderstanding"), was a privateer sloop or small corvette commissioned at Calais circa 1799 and in Guadeloupe in 1800 under a Captain Comeux, with 98 men and eight 8-pounder and 4-pounder guns. She made a second cruise under Captain C.F. Toupie, with 98 men and eight guns (same as before).)

On 24 December Gipsey detained the American schooner Polly, which was sailing from Baltimore to Santiago de Cuba with a cargo of naval stores. The master, when hailed, stated that Polly was bound to Saint Bartholomew, but her papers and clearance were for Cuba.

On 27 December Gipsey detained the Hamburg ship Aurora, which was carrying a cargo of sugar, cotton, and indigo. The evidence showed that Aurora was bound to Bordeaux, even though the master had destroyed her papers.

On 5 January 1801 Gipsey captured the Swedish schooner Courtenny, which was carrying a cargo of sugar, coffee, and indigo. She had come from Point Petre and Gipsey chased her until Courtenny upset off Saint Bartholomew.

On 2 February Tamar, Gipsey, and Cayenne recaptured the American brig Industry. Industry was carrying a cargo of cattle and mules.

On 19 October 1803 Gipsey was under the command of Lieutenant E.K. Foley, of HMS Hercule. She was about six or eight leagues south of Cape Maize when she encountered a French privateer schooner of two long 18-pounder guns and a large crew. After a running fight of two hours and forty minutes, Gipsey drove the privateer on shore. Although Foley claimed to have completely destroyed the French schooner, he had to abandon any attempt to get her off because the night was dark and the wind was rising.

Late in 1803, Michael Fitton was appointed to Gipsy, then tender to HMS Abergavenny. At the attack on Curaçao in 1804, Fitton was the only officer in the squadron who was acquainted with the island. The therefore piloted the ships in and had virtually the direction of the landing. On the failure of the expedition Gipsy carried the despatches to the admiral, and Fitton, in accordance with the senior officer's recommendation, received a promotion to lieutenant.
