= Battle of the Mona Passage =

1782 battle of the American Revolutionary War

- Part of the American Revolutionary War
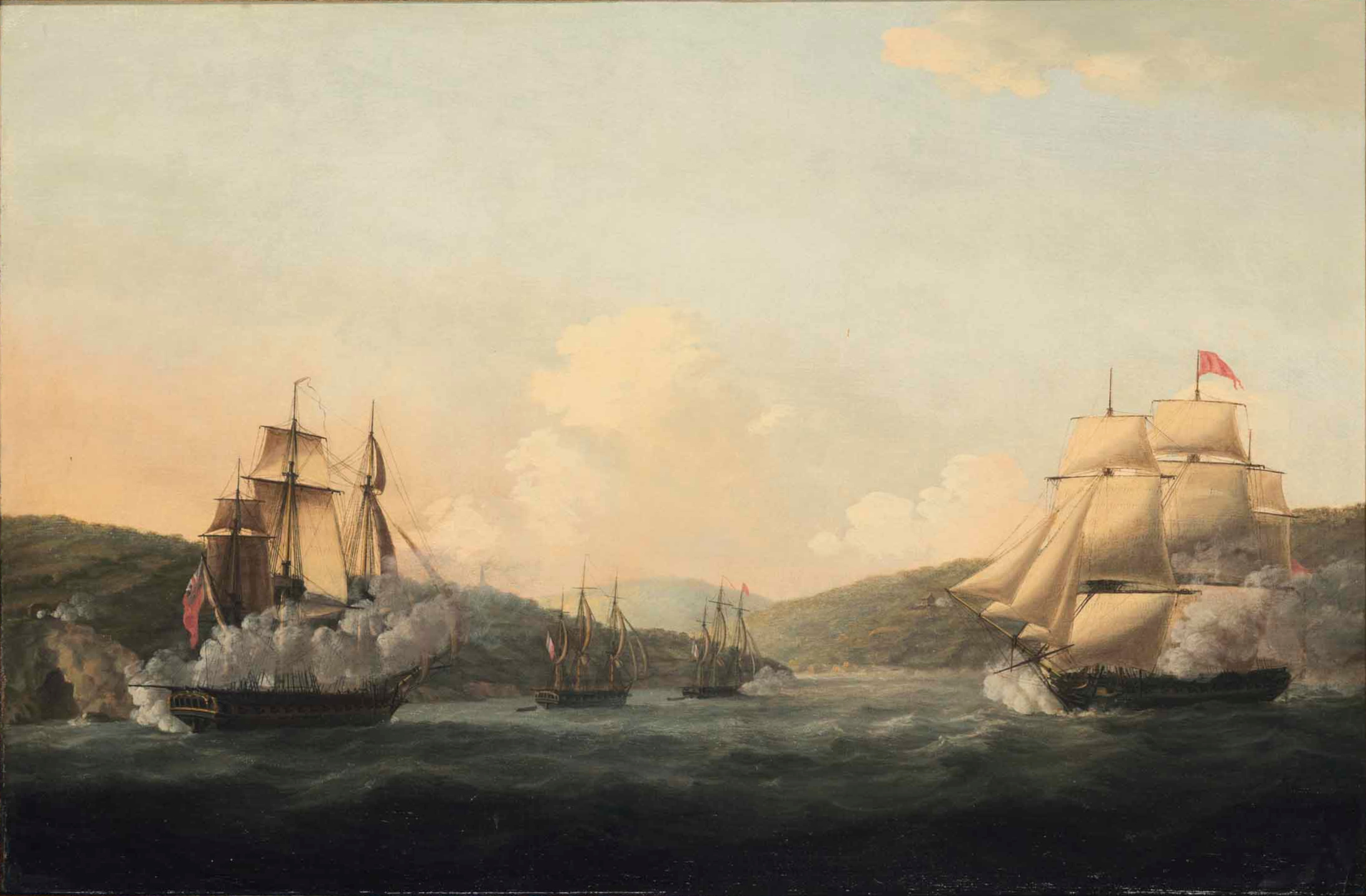
- Painting of the battle
Date	19 April 1782
Location	Mona Passage, Caribbean Sea 18°30′N 68°0′W
Result	British victory

Belligerents
Great Britain	France

Commanders and leaders
Sir Samuel Hood	Georges-François de Framond

Strength
10 ships of the line 1 frigate 1 fire ship	2 ships of the line 2 frigates 1 corvette

Casualties and losses
10 killed 14 wounded	Unknown killed or wounded 1,300 captured 2 ships of the line captured 1 frigate captured 1 corvette captured

The Battle of the Mona Passage was fought on 19 April 1782 between the British and French navies during the American Revolutionary War. A British fleet under Rear-Admiral of the Blue Sir Samuel Hood engaged a French squadron under Georges-François de Framond which had escaped the Battle of the Saintes a week earlier. The two forces met and engaged at the Mona Passage where Hood's fleet overtook and captured four French warships, completing the British victory at the Saintes.

== Background ==
Between 9 and 12 April 1782 a British fleet under Admiral of the White Sir George Rodney engaged and defeated a French fleet under François Joseph Paul de Grasse at the Battle of the Saintes, foiling French plans for an invasion of Jamaica. The victorious British fleet made its way to Jamaica, from where Rodney ordered Rear-Admiral of the Blue Sir Samuel Hood's squadron to seek out any disabled or damaged French ships that had escaped the battle. On 17 April Hood's squadron of 10 ships of the line, one frigate and one fire ship set out toward the French colony of Saint-Domingue.

== Battle ==
Both of these ships were in the Mona Passage, the strait separating Hispaniola and Puerto Rico and were making sail for Cap-Français along with several smaller ships, when Hood's squadron spotted the French. These were under the command of Georges-François de Framond and the ships were in a poor state; the French 64-gun ship of the line Caton under Georges-François de Framond had been damaged in the initial encounter at the battle of the Saintes on 9 April, and the Jason, also 64 guns, had been damaged the following day when it collided with the heavily-damaged Zélé. Hood chased down the French ships, the faster copper-sheathed British ships outpacing the damaged French ships. HMS Valiant captured both Jason and Caton at the cost of four men killed and six wounded, whilst HMS Magnificent captured the frigate Aimable at the cost of four killed and eight wounded. Champion captured the frigate Astrée, but the latter managed to escape with minimal damage.

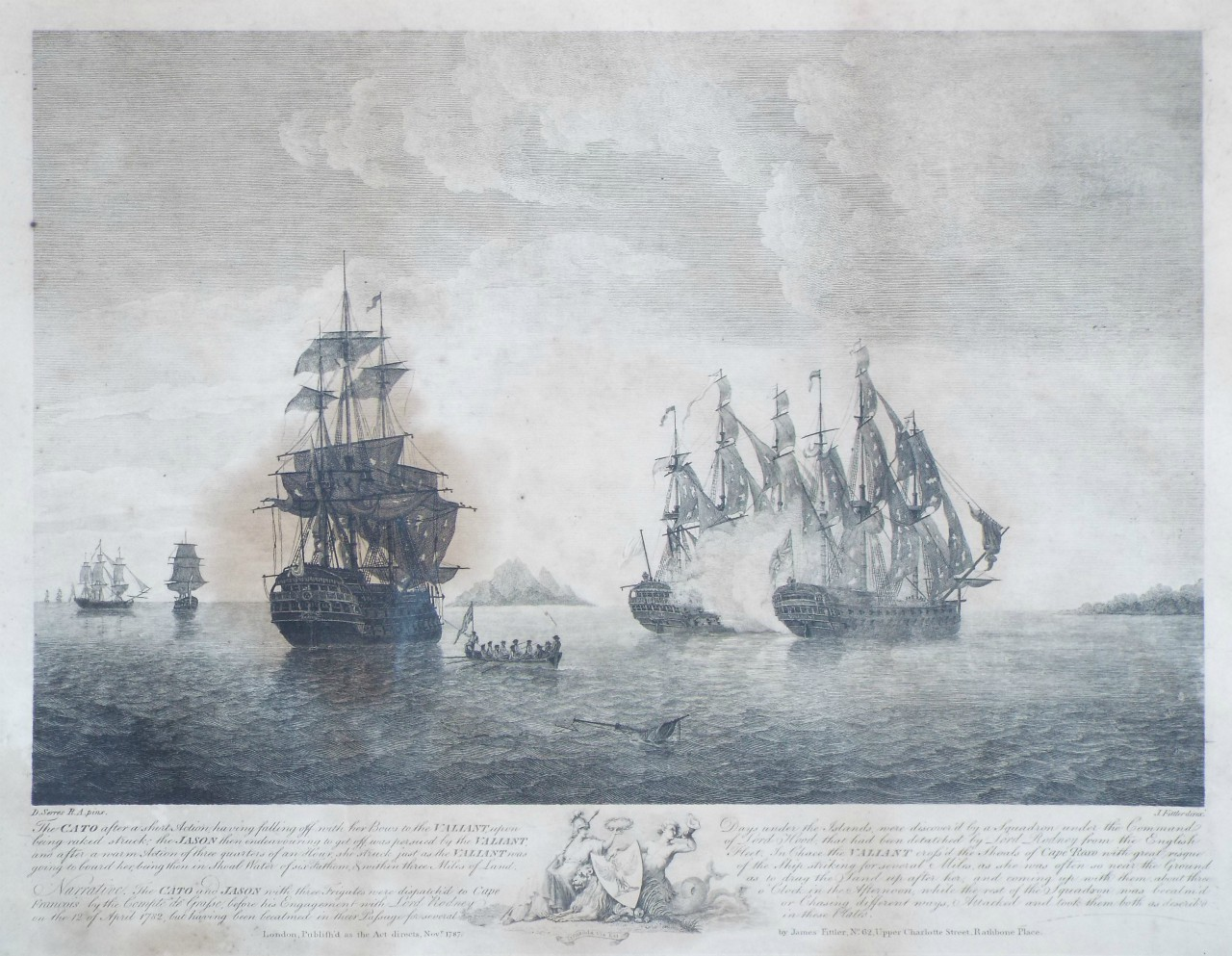
Lithograph of the battle by Dominic Serres

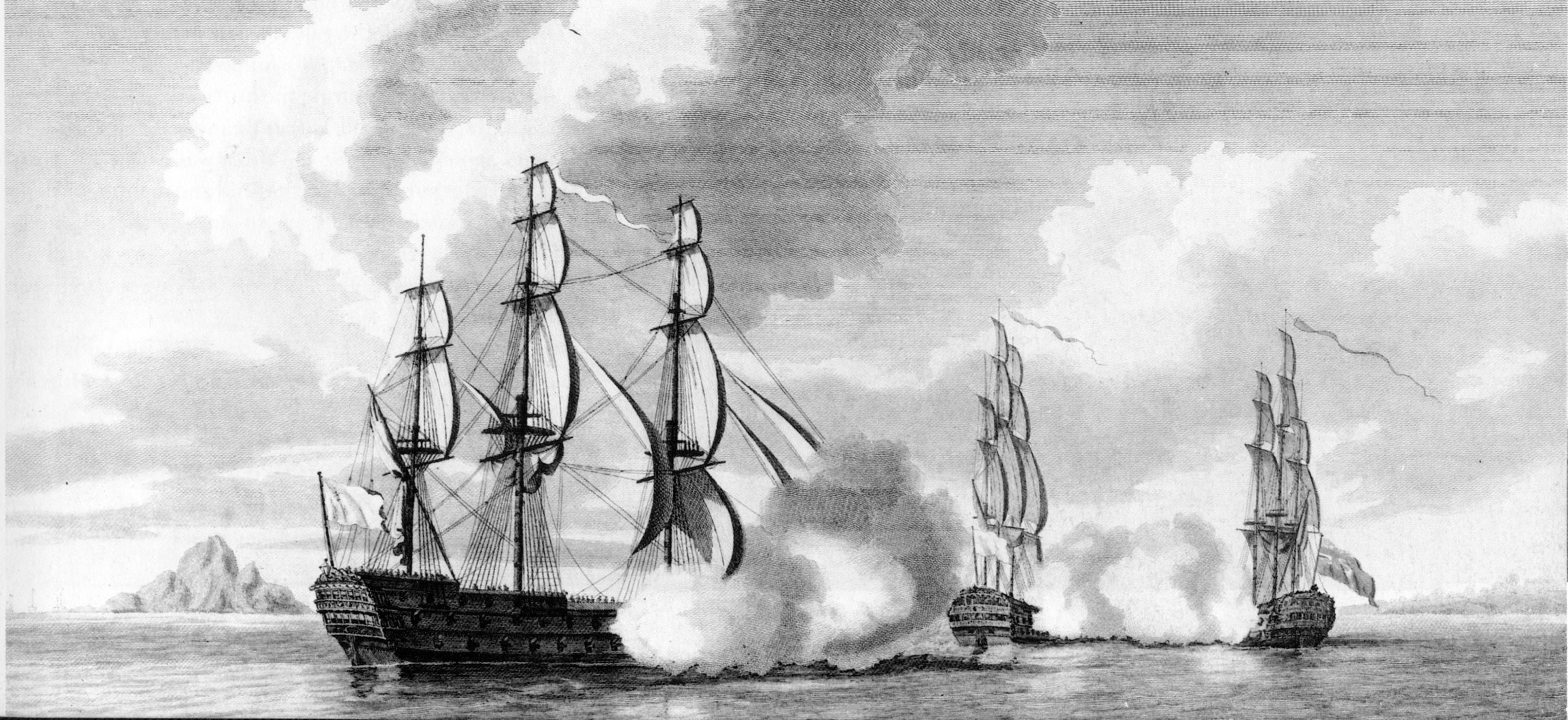
Caton and Jason engaging Valiant during the battle

== Aftermath ==
Following this victory Hood rendezvoused with Rodney at Port Royal on 29 April. As a result of the damage the fleet had sustained in both battles, repairs took nine weeks.

The captured French ships were taken back to England for further use. Jason was renamed HMS Argonaut, while Caton was used as a prisoner of war hospital ship and moored off Saltash in Cornwall. She continued in this role well into the Napoleonic Wars. Aimable was renamed HMS Aimable and served in the Royal Navy until 1811. Cérès, a former British sloop by the same name, became HMS Raven; the French recaptured her in January 1783 and sold her in 1791.

Framond was court-martialed on 27 February 1783 and found guilty and was expelled from the Navy.

== Order of battle ==
=== Britain ===
Barfleur (98) - Flagship of Sir Samuel Hood, Capt. John Knight
Alfred (74) - Capt. Thomas Dumaresq
Belliqueux (64) - Capt. Andrew Sutherland
Magnificent (74) - Capt. Robert Linzee
Monarch (74) - Capt. Francis Reynolds
Montagu (74) - Capt. George Bowen
Prince William (64) - Capt. George Wilkinson
Valiant (74) - Capt. Samuel Goodall
Warrior (74) - Capt. James Wallace
Yarmouth (60) - Capt. Anthony Parrey
Champion (24) - Capt. Thomas West
Alecto (12) - Fire ship

=== France ===
Caton (64) - Capt. de Framond - Captured
Jason (64) - Capt. de la Marthonie - Captured
Astrée (32) - Escaped
Aimable (32) - Cmdt. de Suzannet - Captured
Ceres (18) - Cmdt. de Paroy - Captured
