= Joseph Coëtnempren de Kersaint =

French Navy officer (1746–1797)

- Born: 29 November 1746
- Died: 1797 (aged 50–51); Isle de France (now Mauritius)
- Relatives: Guy François Coëtnempren de Kersaint (father); Armand de Kersaint (brother); Guy Pierre Kersaint (brother)
- Military career
- Allegiance: France
- Branch: French Navy
- Service years: 1762–1782
- Rank: Lieutenant
- Commands: Duc de Chartes

Joseph Coëtnempren de Kersaint (29 November 1746 – 1797) was a French Navy officer.

== Early life ==
Joseph Coëtnempren de Kersaint was born to Guy François Coëtnempren de Kersaint, a French Navy officer. His two brothers, Armand de Kersaint (1742–1793) and Guy Pierre Kersaint (1747–1822), also served in the Navy.

== Military career ==
Kersaint joined the Navy at a Garde-Marine on 25 July 1762. He was promoted to Ensign on 15 September 1771 and to Lieutenant on 5 February 1786.

He served on Heure du Berger from November 1767 to January 1769.

In 1776, he served on the 40-gun frigate Consolante. In June 1778, he transferred to the 64-gun Brillant.

In June 1782, Kersaint, by then retired from the Navy, departed Brest, captaining the corvette Duc de Chartes. He arrived at Achem on 24 November.

== Personal life ==
Kersaint married at Isle de France on 3 April 1780.

== Death ==
He died in 1797 in the Isle de France.

== Notes, citations, and references ==
Notes

Citations

References

- Cunat, Charles (1852). Histoire du Bailli de Suffren. Rennes: A. Marteville et Lefas. p. 447.
- Lacour-Gayet, Georges (1910). La marine militaire de la France sous le règne de Louis XVI. Paris: Honoré Champion.
- Roussel, Claude-Youenn; Forrer, Claude (2019). Tromelin et Suffren, un conflit entre marins. Kronos. ISBN 978-2-917232-88-0.
