= Michael Fitton =

Michael Fitton (1766–1852) was an English lieutenant in the Royal Navy. During his career he made some 30 to 40 captures of enemy, chiefly French, vessels. Despite his notable victory over the French privateer Superbe in 1806, for which he received various honours, including a medal, and his earlier successes, Fitton never received a promotion beyond the rank of lieutenant. Not only did he lack a powerful patron but there is some suggestion that he may, by injudicious conduct early in his naval career, have made a powerful enemy. He died in 1852.

== Origins ==
Fitton was born at Gawsworth in Cheshire, the ancient seat of his family.

== Naval career ==
He entered the navy in June 1780, on board HMS Vestal, with Captain George Keppel.

On 10 September Vestal gave chase to and captured the Mercury packet, having on board Henry Laurens, previously president of Congress, on his way to the Netherlands as ambassador of the revolted American colonies. During the chase young Fitton, being on the foretop-gallant yard, hailed the deck to say that there was a man overboard from the enemy. When Vestal sent a boat to pick him up, the man turned out to be a bag of papers, which being insufficiently weighted, was recovered. These papers compromised the Dutch government and led Britain to declare war against the Netherlands a few months afterwards. Fitton continued with Captain Keppel during the war in different ships, and as midshipman on HMS Fortitude was present at the relief of Gibraltar in 1782.

=== French Revolutionary Wars ===
In 1793 Fitton was again with Captain Keppel as a master's mate in the 74-gun third rate HMS Defiance. In 1796 he was appointed purser of the sloop HMS Stork in the West Indies, and in 1799 was acting lieutenant of the 54-gun fourth rate HMS Abergavenny on the Jamaica station, from which he was detached in command of one or another of her tenders.

In 1800 Fitton commanded the 8-gun schooner Active. She assisted Nereide at the capitulation of Curaçao on 13 September 1800.

As captain of the schooner Ferret he cruised the Mona Passage, in company with the cutter Sparrow, commanded by Mr. Whylie. The two accidentally separated for a few days. On rejoining, Fitton invited Whylie by signal to come to breakfast, and while waiting caught a large shark that was under the stern. In its stomach was found a packet of papers relating to an American brig Nancy. When Whylie came on board, he mentioned that he had detained an American brig called Nancy. Fitton then said that he had her papers. 'Papers?' answered Whylie; 'why, I sealed up her papers and sent them in with her.' 'Just so,' replied Fitton; 'those were her false papers; here are her real ones.' And so it proved. The papers were lodged in the Admiralty Court at Port Royal, and by them the brig was condemned. The shark's jaws were set up on shore, with the inscription, 'Lieut. Fitton recommends these jaws for a collar for neutrals to swear through.' The papers were preserved in the museum of the Royal United Service Institution.

Fitton's whole service during the three years in which he commanded the Abergavenny's tenders was marked by daring and good fortune. Several privateers of superior force he captured or beat off. One, which he drove ashore, he boarded by swimming, himself and the greater part of his men plunging into the sea with their swords in their mouths.

=== Napoleonic Wars ===
When war with France resumed in 1803, Fitton was again sent out to Abergavenny and appointed to command her tender, the schooner HMS Gipsy. At the attack on Curaçao in 1804, Fitton was the only officer in the squadron who was acquainted with the island. He therefore piloted the ships in and had virtually the direction of the landing. On the failure of the expedition Gipsy carried the despatches to the admiral, and Fitton, in accordance with the senior officer's recommendation, received a promotion to lieutenant. In Gipsy and afterwards in HMS Pitt, a similar schooner, he continued to pursue French privateers.

On 6 June 1806, Fitton and Pitt captured George. Later that year, on 26 October, after a weary chase of sixty-seven hours, Pitt engaged the French privateer schooner Superbe. HMS Drake came on the scene shortly before the denouement of the action, with the result that the French commander drove his vessel on shore at Ocoa Bay (now in the Dominican Republic), enabling him and his surviving crew to flee before the British retrieved their quarry. Superbe was armed with two 9-pounder and twelve 6-pounder guns, and had a crew of 94 men under the command of M. Dominique Houx. In the engagement the French lost at least four dead and 10 wounded (three of whom were so badly wounded they remained on Superbe), while the British suffered eight wounded. Houx had on board a list of captures that showed a value of £147,000. (Note: Head money was paid in 1823. A first-class share was worth £138 9s 1½d; a fifth-class share, that of a seaman, was worth £1 9s 9¼d.)

Houx afterwards equipped a brig, which he named Revanche de la Superbe, and sent an invitation to Fitton to meet him at a place named; however, before the message arrived Fitton had been superseded as captain by the 17-year-old Thomas John Cochrane, son of admiral Sir Alexander Cochrane, who was then commanding officer of the Leeward Islands station. Fitton had the thanks of the Admiralty, a sword valued at £50 from the Lloyd's Patriotic Fund, and his share of the prize-money, but no command.

Fitton remained unemployed till 1811, when he was appointed to command the gunbrig HMS Archer for the Channel. In Archer, Fitton captured the Danish schooner Thisted.

In February 1812 he took command of the gunbrig HMS Cracker for service in the North Sea and Baltic. In Cracker, Fitton captured the American ship America on 1 August. Then on 26 August, Fitton captured the American ship Dido, and shared the prize money, by agreement, with HMS Gallant. (Note: A first-class share of the prize money was worth £418 3s 9d; a sixth-class share, that of an ordinary seaman, was worth £24 13s 7d.)

Cracker was sold for breaking up in November 1815.

== Post-war ==
In 1831 Fitton was appointed a lieutenant of the ordinary at Plymouth, and in 1835 was admitted to Greenwich Hospital. He stayed there until his death, which took place at Peckham on 31 December 1852.

== Fictional appearance ==
The real-life Fitton was featured as the principal character in a series of eleven novels by the Welsh author Showell Styles, portraying actual events in the life of this naval officer.

== See also ==
- O'Byrne, William Richard (1849). "Fitton, Michael" . A Naval Biographical Dictionary . John Murray – via Wikisource.
