= Bunker Hill (1778 ship) =

History

Massachusetts
- Name: Bunker Hill
- Namesake: Battle of Bunker Hill
- Owner: Bartholomew Putnam and Jacob Ashton
- Commissioned: May 1778
- Home port: Salem, Massachusetts
- Captured: December 1778

Kingdom of Great Britain
- Name: HMS Surprize
- Acquired: October 1778 by capture
- Fate: Sold 1783

General characteristics
- Tons burthen: 222 63/94 (bm)
- Length: 96 ft 9 in (29.5 m) (gundeck); 80 ft 5 3/8 in (24.5 m) (keel)
- Beam: 22 ft 10 in (7.0 m)
- Depth of hold: 16 ft 10 in (5.1 m)
- Sail plan: Sloop
- Complement: Bunker Hill: 100; HMS Surprize: 125
- Armament: Bunker Hill: 18-20 × 6-pounder guns; HMS Surprize: 18 × 6-pounder guns + 8 × 1/2-pounder swivel guns

Bunker Hill was a Massachusetts privateer sloop, first commissioned in 1778. She made two cruises, capturing three prizes, but during her second cruise the Royal Navy captured her at Saint Lucia. The Royal Navy took her into service as HMS Surprize. She served in the Caribbean, and was one of the two sloops that captured Essequibo and Demerara in March 1781. She sailed to Britain in late 1782 where the Navy sold her in 1783. The French Navy may have purchased her. If so, they sold her in 1789.

== Bunker Hill ==
Bunker Hill, under the command of Edward Rolland, departed on her first cruise in mid-June 1778. She returned on 26 September, having captured one vessel, which was possibly the 50-ton (bm) brig Mary, Thomas Mallowney, master.

Commander Nicholas Ogelbe commissioned Bunker Hill on 27 October. On 2 December he sailed her from Salem, intending to cruise off Barbados. Two days out of port Bunker Hill captured the 100-ton (bm) schooner Delaware, Thomas Butler, master. She was sailing from Quebec to New York with a cargo of flour. Ogelbe sent her into Salem. Later, Bunker Hill captured a second vessel.

On 22 December Bunker Hill sailed into Grand Cul De Sac Bay, Saint Lucia at night. She had made an error in navigation and thought she was joining up with the French fleet under Count d'Estaing, which was anchored about a league away from the British fleet under Admiral Barrington that had captured St Lucia. In the morning she discovered that she was anchored within cannon-shot of the British. Bunker Hill struck and the boats of Barrington's fleet took possession of her before any French vessel could intervene. Barrington decided to take her into service as she was a fast sailer and he had just been informed that the French had captured Ceres.

== HMS Surprize ==
Admiral Barrington renamed Bunker Hill Surprize in recognition of the manner of her capture. The Royal Navy commissioned Surprize on 25 December 1778 with Barrington promoting Lieutenant James Brine, first lieutenant of Prince of Wales into her as master and commander. Barrington paid £1017 7s 1 3/4d for Bunker Hill on 6 January 1779. He manned Surprize with 125 men. He also arranged an exchange of prisoners, the crew of Bunker Hill for the crew of Ceres.

On 3 April 1779 Surprize captured the Elizabeth.

In December 1779, Commander George Day replaced Brine. He sailed her to the Leeward Islands on 25 December.

On 27 February 1781 Surprize and HMS Barbuda (Commander Francis Pender), which Admiral Lord Rodney had sent from St Eustatius, appeared at Demerara. In March, the sloops accepted the surrender of "Colony of Demarary and the River Essequebo". Shortly before they arrived, six British privateers had raided Essequibo and Demerara, captured sixteen Dutch ships, and forced the de facto surrender of the colonies.

Around April 1782 Commander William Miller replaced Day. In August Surprize was at Antigua being coppered.

== Fate ==
The Navy paid off Surprize in November 1782. It then sold her on 16 January 1783 for £550.

The French may have purchased her with her becoming the Surprise, which was broken up at Rochefort in 1789.
