= Showell Styles =

English writer and mountaineer

Frank Showell Styles (14 March 1908 – 19 February 2005) was an English writer and mountaineer.

== Life and career ==
Showell Styles was born in Four Oaks, a suburb of Sutton Coldfield then in Warwickshire. He was educated at the town's Bishop Vesey's Grammar School. His father Alfred Thomas Styles was also born in Four Oaks, in 1882. Known to his friends as 'Pip', Showell Styles' childhood was spent in the hills of North Wales where he became an avid mountaineer and explorer. During the Second World War, Styles joined the Royal Navy and was posted in the Mediterranean, but even there he walked and climbed as much as he could. As reported in his obituary by the daily post, in the early 1950s Showell Styles led several expeditions in the Himalayas and Arctic. He also climbed in the Pyrenees and Alps.

An aspiring writer, Styles already had articles published in Punch, before setting out to make his living as an author. His first novel, Traitor's Mountain, was a murder mystery set on and around Tryfan in Wales. He became a prolific writer with over 160 books published for children as well as adults. In addition to historic naval adventure fiction such as the Midshipman Quinn and Lieutenant Michael Fitton series set during the Napoleonic Wars, and non-fiction works on mountains and such as The Mountaineer's Weekend Book, he wrote detective fiction under the pseudonym of Glyn Carr, and humorous pieces as C.L. Inker.

== Works ==
Children's books

- First Up Everest (1969), illustrated by Raymond Briggs, LCCN 69-10377
- Marty's Mountain (1973), illus. Malcolm Hargreaves
- Welsh Tales for Children (1974), retold by Styles, illus. Bernadette Watts

Anthologies edited

- Men and Mountaineering: An Anthology of Writings by Climbers (1968), LCCN 78-369018

=== Fiction ===
Midshipman Septimus Quinn

- Midshipman Quinn (1956)
- Quinn of the Fury (1958)
- Midshipman Quinn and Denise the Spy (1961)
- Midshipman Quinn Wins Through (1961)
- Quinn at Trafalgar (1965)
- The Midshipman Quinn Collection (omnibus) (2000)

Lieutenant Michael Fitton Adventures

- A Sword for Mr. Fitton (1975)
- Mr. Fitton's Commission (1977)
- The Baltic Convoy (1979)
- Gun Brig Captain (1987)
- A Ship for Mr. Fitton (1991)
- Mr. Fitton's Prize (1993)
- Mr. Fitton and the Black Legion (1994)
- Mr. Fitton in Command (1995)
- The 12-Gun Cutter (1996)
- Lieutenant Fitton (1997)
- Mr. Fitton at the Helm (1998)
- The Martinique Mission 1999)
- Mr. Fitton's Hurricane (2000)

Tiger Patrol

- Tiger Patrol (1957)
- The Tiger Patrol Wins Through (1958)
- The Tiger Patrol at Sea (1958)
- The Tiger Patrol Presses On (1961)

Wolf Cubs

- Red for Adventure (1965)
- Wolf Cub Island (1966)
- The Sea Cub (1967)
- Cubs of the Castle (1969)
- Cubs on the Job (19720

Simon & Mag Hughes

- The Shop in the Mountain (1961)
- The Ladder of Snow (1962)
- A Necklace of Glaciers (1963)
- The Pass of Morning (1966)

Abercrombie Lewker

- Traitor's Mountain (1946)
- Kidnap Castle (1947)
- Hammer Island (1948)
  - Subsequent Lewker novels were written under the pseudonym Glyn Carr
- Murder on the Matterhorn (1951)
- Death on Milestone Buttress (1951)
- The Youth Hostel Murders (1952)
- The Corpse in the Crevasse (1952)
- Death Under Snowdon (1954)
- A Corpse at Camp Two (1955)
- Murder of an Owl (1956)
- The Ice Axe Murders (1958)
- Swing Away Climber (1959)
- Holiday With Murder (1960)
- Death Finds a Foothold (1961)
- Lewker in Norway (1963)
- Death of a Weirdy (1965)
- Lewker in Tyrol (1967)
- Fat Man's Agony (1969)

Other novels

Sir Devil (1949)
Path to Glory (1951)
Dark Hazard (1952)
Land from the Sea (1952)
Mr. Nelson's Ladies (1953)
The Frigate Captain (1954)
His Was Fire (1956)
The Lost Glacier (1956)
The Sea Lord (1956)
Kami the Sherpa (US Title: Sherpa Adventure) (1957)
Admiral's Fancy (1958)
Wolfe Commands You (1959)
Shadow Buttress (1959)
The Battle of Cotton: Revolution in Britain (1960)
Greencoats Against Napoleon (1960)
The Flying Ensign: Greencoats Against Napoleon (1960)
The Battle of Steam: Revolution in Britain (1961)
The Lost Pothole (1961)
The Sea Officer (1961)
Byrd of the 95th (1962)
Gentleman Johnny (1962)
Thunder Over Spain (1962)
H.M.S. Diamond Rock (1963)
The Camp in the Hills (1964)
Greenhorn's Cruise (1964)
Mr Fiddle (1965)
Number Two-Ninety (1966)
Confederate Raider (1967)
Mr Fiddle's Band (1967)
Indestructible Jones (1967)
Journey with a Secret (1968) (aka Mystery of the Fleeing Girl)]
Sea Road to Camperdown (1968)
Journey with a Success (1969)
Jones' Private Navy (1969)
Case for Mister Fiddle (1969)
The Snowdon Rangers (1970)
Forbidden Frontiers (1970)
A Tent on Top (1971)
Vincey Joe at Quiberon (1971)
Admiral of England (1973)
Kiss for Captain Hardy (1979)
Centurion Comes Home (1980)
Quarterdeck Ladder (1982)
Seven Gun Broadside (1982)
Stella And The Fireships (1983)
The Malta Frigate (1983)
Mutiny in the Caribbean (1984)
The Lee Shore (1986)
H. M. S. Cracker (1988)
Nelson Made Me (1989)
Nelson's Midshipman (1991)
The Independent Cruise (1992)

=== Non-fiction ===
A Climber in Wales (1949)
Walks and Climbs in Malta (1949)
The Mountaineer's Week-End Book (1950)
Introduction to Mountaineering (1954)
Mountains of the Midnight Sun (1954)
The Moated Mountain (1955)
The Camper's and Tramper's Week-End Book (1957)
Introduction to Caravanning (1957)
Getting to Know Mountains (1958)
How Mountains Are Climbed (1958)
How Underground Britain Is Explored (1959)
Look At Mountains (1962)
Modern Mountaineering (1964)
Blue Remembered Hills (1965)
The Foundations of Climbing (1966)
Climbing (1967)
On Top of the World (1967)
The Arrow Book of Climbing (1967)
Rock and Rope (1967)
Mallory of Everest (1967)
The Climber's Bedside Book (1968)
First on the Summits (1970)
Welsh Walks and Legends (1972)
What to See in Beddgelert and How to See It (1973)
Snowdon Range: Snowdonia District Guide Books (1973)
Mountains of North Wales (1973)

Glyder Range: Snowdonia District Guide Books (1974)
Exploring Gwynedd from Porthmadog (1974)
Souvenir Guide: Chwarel Hên Llanfair, Old Llanfair Quarry, Slate Caverns (1974)
Backpacking in Alps and Pyrenees (1976)
Backpacking: A Comprehensive Guide (1976)
Backpacking in Wales (1977)
Welsh walks & legends, South Wales (1977)
Llanberis Area Guide (1978)
Walks in Gwynedd (1980)
Public Footpath Walks from the Cambrian Coast (1980)
Walks from the Festiniog Railway (1980)
Snowdonia National Park: National Parks Guide (1987)
Welsh Walks and Legends: North Wales (1996)
North Wales Walks and Legends (2002)

Short non-fiction

- "Women are Climbing", Coventry Herald (14 January 1939)
- "Personalities of the Crumb Board", SMT Magazine & Scottish Country Life (March 1939)
- "The Battle of Camp Hill", Warwickshire Evening Despatch (6 April 1939)
- "Hands off the Park", Birmingham Mail (22 June 1939)
- "What's All the Fuss about?", Warwickshire Evening Despatch (5 July 1939)
- "Cheapest Way of Seeing the World", Midland Daily Telegraph (12 September 1939)
