= French ship Caton =

Ship of the line of the French Navy

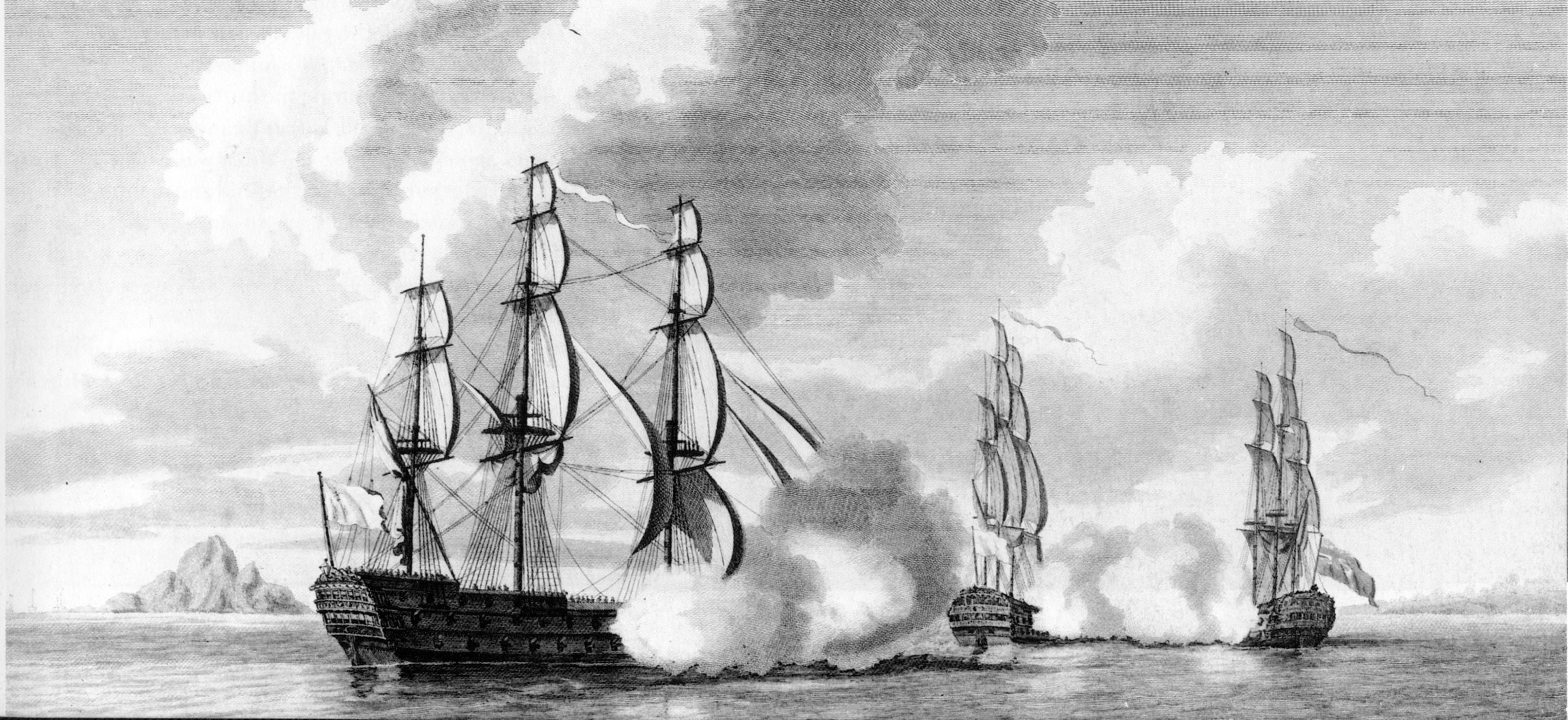
- Caton (first from left) at the Battle of the Mona Passage

History

France
- Name: Caton
- Builder: Toulon
- Laid down: April 1770
- Launched: 5 July 1777
- Completed: May 1778
- Captured: 19 April 1782, by Royal Navy

Great Britain
- Name: Caton
- Acquired: 19 April 1782
- In service: Registered on 29 January 1783
- Reclassified: Hospital ship from August 1790
- Fate: Sold on 9 February 1815

General characteristics
- Class & type: 64-gun third rate ship of the line
- Tons burthen: 1,407 23/94 (bm)
- Length: 166 ft (51 m) (gundeck); 136 ft 4.75 in (41.5735 m) (keel)
- Beam: 44 ft 0.5 in (13.424 m)
- Depth of hold: 19 ft 4 in (5.89 m)
- Sail plan: Full-rigged ship
- Complement: 500 (491 from 1794)
- Armament: Lower deck: 26 × 24-pounders; Upper deck: 26 × 18-pounders; Quarterdeck: 10 × 9-pounders; Forecastle: 2 × 9-pounders

Caton was a 64-gun ship of the line of the French Navy, launched in 1777.

== French career ==
In 1780, Caton was part of the squadron under Guichen, captained by Georges-François de Framond. Caton was later attached to the squadron commanded by De Grasse. She took part in the Battle of Martinique on 17 April 1780, as well as in the two smaller engagements of 15 and 19 May 1780.

At the Battle of Fort Royal, on 29 April 1781, Caton was one of the four ships to come reinforce the squadron under De Grasse, along with Victoire, Réfléchi and Solitaire. She took part in the Battle of the Chesapeake on 5 September 1781.

On 10 April 1782, in the run-up to the Battle of the Saintes, Caton found herself becalmed and Framond asked for assistance. Despite having been sent a frigate, Framond decided to anchor at Basse-Terre without authorisation from his hierarchy. He thus failed to take part in the Battle of the Saintes, and a few days after, on 19 April 1782, Caton was captured at the Battle of the Mona Passage.

== British career ==
Caton was captured by the Royal Navy at the Battle of the Mona Passage on 19 April 1782, and commissioned as the third rate HMS Caton. She sailed with the fleet for England on 25 July 1782 but was said to have been lost later that year in a hurricane storm off Newfoundland on 16–17 September, along with the other captured French prize ships Ville de Paris, and Hector. In fact, she struggled to reach Halifax NS.

On 26 January 1783, a small British convoy of eight military transports sailed out of Halifax for England; accompanied by Caton, and escorted by the 36-gun frigate HMS Pallas.

Later she became a prison hospital ship at Plymouth and was placed on harbour service in 1798, and sold out of the service in 1815.
