= HMS Abergavenny =

British ship of the line (1795–1807)

History

East India Company
- Name: Earl of Abergavenny
- Namesake: Earl of Abergavenny
- Owner: William Dent (principal managing owner)
- Ordered: 5 December 1787
- Builder: Joseph Graham, Harwich
- Laid down: 8 March 1788
- Launched: 24 August 1789
- Fate: Sold to the Royal Navy in 1795

Great Britain
- Name: HMS Abergavenny
- Namesake: Abergavenny in Monmouthshire
- Builder: Thomas Pitched, Northfleet
- Acquired: 1795
- Commissioned: April 1795
- Fate: Sold 1807

General characteristics
- Class & type: 1) Indiaman; 2) fourth rate
- Tons burthen: 118293/94 (bm)
- Length: 160 ft 6 1/2 in (48.9 m) (overall); 131 ft 6 in (40.1 m) (keel)
- Beam: 41 ft 1 1/2 in (12.5 m)
- Depth of hold: 17 ft 0 in (5.2 m)
- Sail plan: Full-rigged ship
- Complement: Indiaman: 99 men Fourth rate: 324 men
- Armament: Indiaman: 26 × 12 & 9-pounder guns; Fourth rate: Gun deck: 28 × 18-pounder guns; Upper deck: 26 × 32-pounder carronades; Fc: 2 × 18-pounder carronades

HMS Abergavenny was originally Earl of Abergavenny, an East Indiaman sailing for the British East India Company (EIC). As an East Indiaman she made two trips to China between 1790 and 1794. The Royal Navy bought her in 1795, converted her to a 56-gun fourth-rate ship of the line, and renamed her. One year later the East India Company built a new and much larger ship which was also named the Earl of Abergavenny and which sank off Weymouth Bay in 1805. HMS Abergavenny was sold for breaking in 1807.

== East India Company ==
Captain John Wordsworth completed two return voyages to China and back between January 1790 and September 1794.

On her first voyage Earl of Abergavenny departed the Downs on 30 January 1790, arriving Bombay, India on 5 June 1790. She left there on 8 August and arrived in Penang on 25 August. She reached Whampoa on 3 October. For her return she crossed the Second Bar on 4 February 1791 and reached St Helena on 17 August. She arrived back at the Downs on 17 August.

On her second voyage, Wordsworth sailed with a letter of marque dated 23 April 1793. This authorized her to take prizes should the opportunity arise.

She left Portsmouth on 22 May 1793. She was part of a convoy that also included the East Indiamen Prince William, Lord Thurlow, William Pitt, Barwell, Earl of Oxford, Osterley, Fort William, London, Glatton, Houghton, Marquis of Landsdown, Hillsborough, Ceres, and Pigot, amongst numerous other vessels, merchant and military, most of the non-Indiamen travelling to the Mediterranean.

Earl of Abergavenny reached Manila on 11 November. From there she sailed to China, reaching Whampoa on 20 December. At Whampoa that December were several East Indiamen that on their return to Britain the Admiralty would purchase: Royal Charlotte, The British Government had chartered Hindostan to take Lord Macartney to China in an unsuccessful attempt to open diplomatic and commercial relations with the Chinese empire.

For her return Earl of Abergavenny crossed the Second Bar on 1 February 1794 and reached St Helena on 18 June. She then arrived at the Downs on 7 September.

== Naval service ==
Abergavenny was commissioned in April 1795 under Captain Edward Tyrell Smith. In June 1795 she was sent to Cork to transport troops for the Santo Domingo part of Admiral Christian’s expedition. Smith then sailed her to Jamaica on 24 February 1796.

She operated from 1796 until 1807 as a guard ship and flagship at Port Royal in Jamaica under a number of commanders. From December 1796 to June 1798 she was under the command of Captain John Cochet (or Couchet). He was present at the British defense of Port-au-Prince in mid-April 1797 when he sailed Abergavenny and some other ships to Léogâne to carry out a diversion. She then was instrumental in the evacuation of Port-au-Prince in mid-May 1798, the terms of the withdrawal having been signed on her on 30 April between representatives of General Toussaint L'Overture for the army of the French Republic, and of General Thomas Maitland for the British forces.

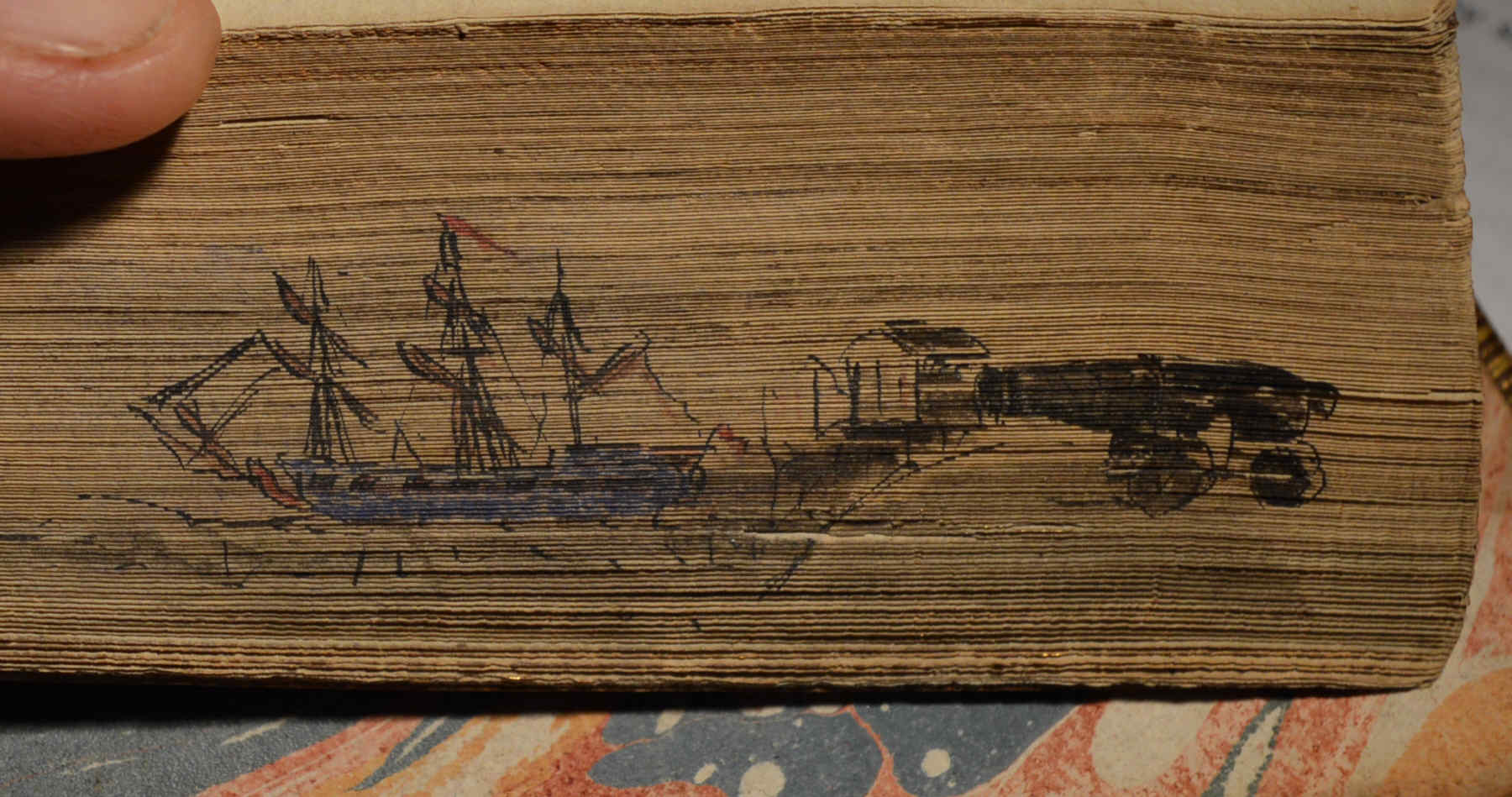
Fore-edge painting of HMS Abergavenny, from a book printed in 1780 from the ship's library (see below) during its time in naval service. Diameter of painting 72mm. Purchased in London in 1993.

Couchet's replacement was Captain Samuel Forster. Between November 1798 and July 1799, Abergavenny's tender and boats captured 13 merchant vessels.

- San Joseph, of Genoa, in ballast, taken off Portland-Point, Jamaica on 18 November;
- Louisa, merchant schooner carrying staves and heading, sailing under Danish colours but carrying French property, taken at Cow Bay, Jamaica on 14 February 1799;
- Candelacia, Spanish schooner carrying dollars, taken west of Cow Bay on 9 March;
- Rosetta, Spanish sloop carrying mules, taken in Cow Bay on 18 March;
- Polly, sloop carrying mules and flying Swedish colours but Dutch property, taken off White Horse on 28 March;
- Mid Bergen, merchant ship in ballast, flying Swedish colours but Dutch property, taken off Helshire Point on 22 May;
- San Josef, Spanish schooner carrying sugar, taken off Trinidad, Cuba on 6 June;
- Fortunee, French schooner-rigged boat carrying 24,000 dollars, taken off Santiago de Cuba on 25 June;
- Spanish sloop, name unknown and carrying mahogany and fustick, taken off Point Abaco, St. Domingo on 22 July;
- French armed schooner of unknown name and with a crew of 50, taken of the Isle of Ash on 22 July;
- Hebe, schooner carrying dry goods and provisions, flying Danish colours, taken off Point Abaco on 23 July;
- Olive, schooner carrying dry goods and provisions, flying Danish colours, taken off Point Abaco on 24 July;
- Del Nordische Lew, ship carrying sail cloth, dry goods and provisions, flying Danish colours, taken off the Isle of Ash on 27 July.

Abergavenney apparently had several tenders seriatim. The tender Ferret and the cutter Sparrow were involved in a curious incident in which Ferret's captain, Acting Lieutenant Michael Fitton, served a shark to Lieutenant Hugh Wilie, captain of Sparrow and then surprised him with some papers. Earlier, in preparing the shark, the crew had discovered that the shark's stomach held true papers for that brig Nancy that Sparrow had captured on 28 August 1799 and that Nancy's captain had thrown overboard to hide the fact that she was American, not English.

On 5 October, Fitton and Ferret engaged a large Spanish privateer that escaped into Santiago de Cuba. Ferret was a schooner of six 3-pounder guns and 45 men. Later interrogation of prisoners that had belonged to the Spanish privateer revealed that she carried fourteen 6-pounder guns and a crew of 100. Ferret had no casualties; the privateer reportedly had suffered 11 men killed and 20 wounded.

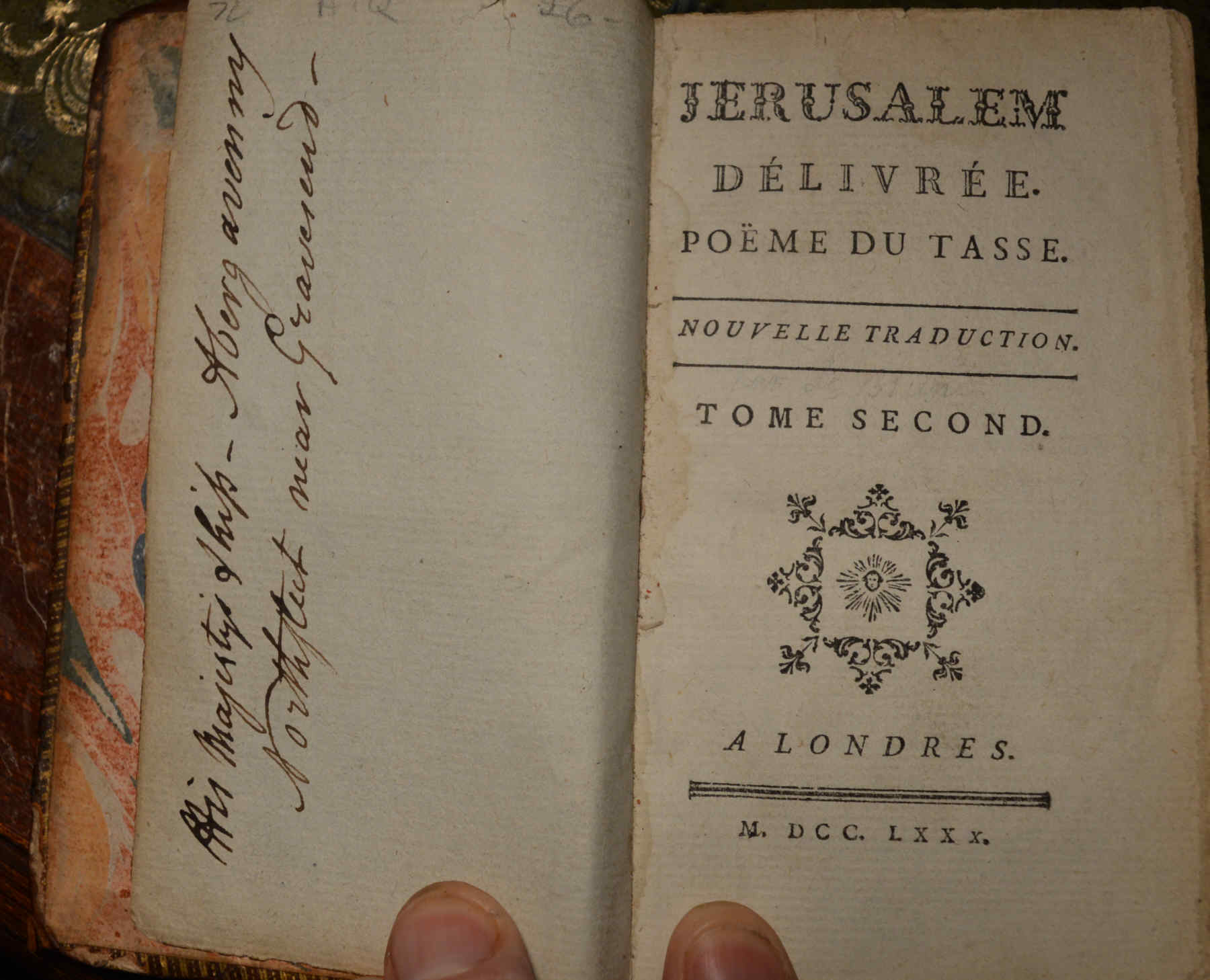
Inscription in the book printed in 1780 from the ship's library (see above), reading 'His Majesty's Ship Abergavenny. Northfleet near Gravesend', thus confirming the ship to have been moored there at some point during its naval service of 1795–1807.

Between 28 February 1800 and 20 May, Abergavenny's tender took several more vessels.

- Schooner, name unknown;
- Spanish schooner of unknown name carrying coffee, and a Spanish vessel of unknown name. Both were cut out of a creek by the tender and a boat from Stork

Between 20 May and 3 August the tender captured three Dutch prizes and one French one.

In March 1800 Captain Christopher Laroche assumed command only to be replaced in July by Captain Robert Mends, who in turn was replaced in November by Captain Charles Grant. Captain James Carthew assumed command in August 1801, only to hand over in November to Captain Henry Vansittart. However, during Vansittart's tenure she was temporarily under the command of Commander John Wentworth Loring (May), and Lieutenant (acting) Thomas New (June). Then in February 1802 Lieutenant George Cumyns took command. Stability returned in July when Captain George M'Kinley assumed command.

== Disposal ==
Abergavenny was sold in 1807 on condition that she be broken up.

== In fiction ==
- The novel A Sword for Mr Fitton by Showell Styles is set aboard Abergavenny in 1799. ISBN 978-0-571-24338-9.

== See also ==
- Robert Mends – captain
