= Raid on Essequibo and Demerara (1781) =

British raid during the Fourth Anglo-Dutch War

- Part of the Fourth Anglo-Dutch War
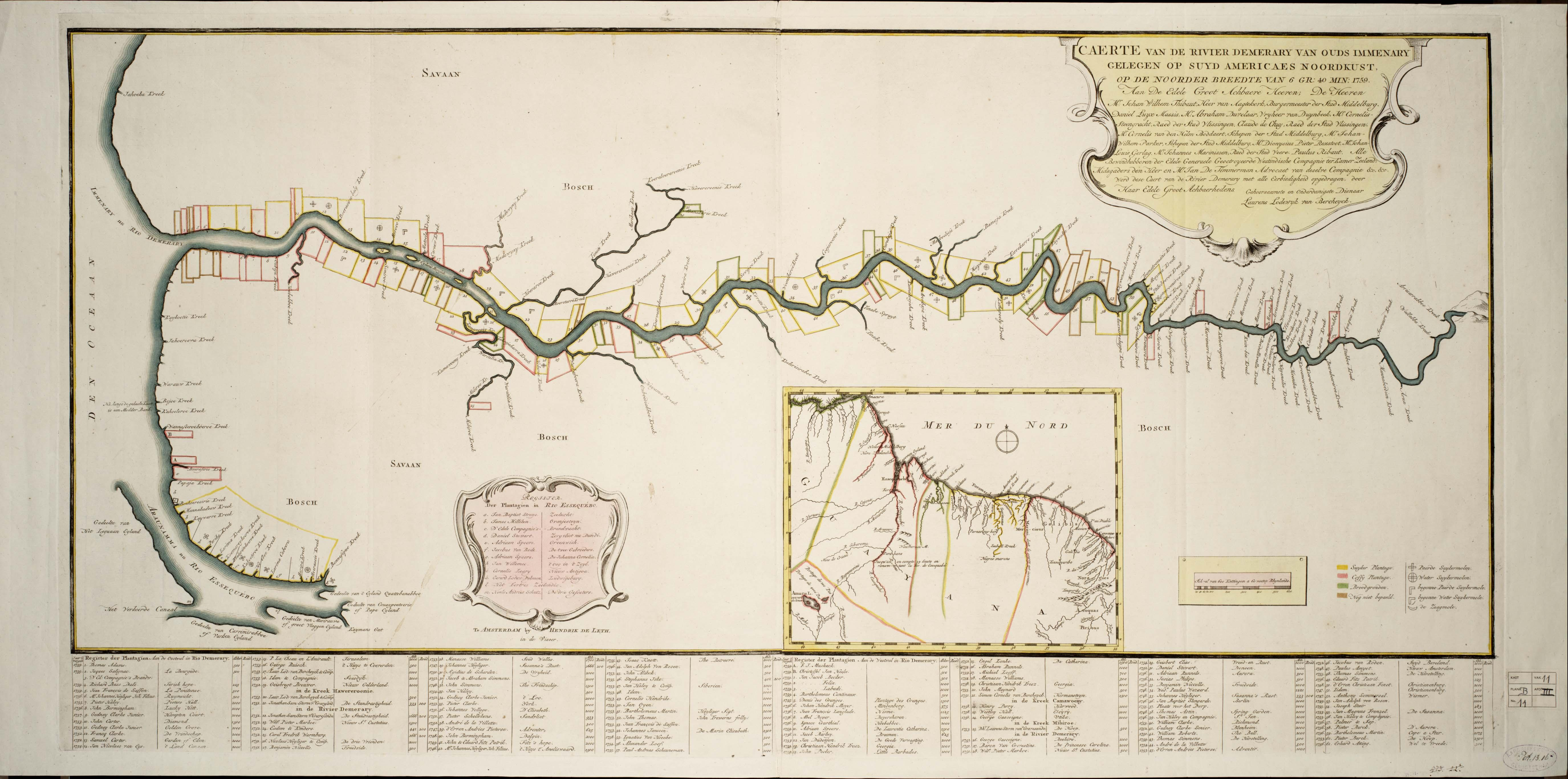
- 1759 map of Demerara
| Date | 24–27 February 1781 |
| Location | Essequibo and Demerara |
| Result | British victory |

Belligerents
| Great Britain | Dutch Republic |

Commanders and leaders
| Unknown | Unknown |

Strength
| 6 privateers | Unknown |

Casualties and losses
| None | 14–15 merchant ships captured |

The raid on Demerara and Essequibo took place between 24 and 27 February 1781 in the context of the Fourth Anglo-Dutch War (1780–1784). Six British privateers entered the rivers and captured 15 Dutch merchant ships before withdrawing.

== Background ==
The Fourth Anglo-Dutch War was a conflict between the Kingdom of Great Britain and the Dutch Republic. The war, contemporaneously related to the American Revolutionary War, broke out over British and Dutch disagreements on the legality and conduct of Dutch trade with Britain's enemies in that war. In 1781 France induced the Dutch to side with them and the Americans.

== Raid ==
The privateers had heard of the outbreak of war between Britain and the Dutch Republic and decided to take advantage of the situation. They did not have letters of marque authorizing offensive action and so had they failed in their attack the Dutch would have been within their rights to hang any captives as pirates. Britain too could have hanged them for piracy, but the privateers "trusted to the Honour of the Government, that no advantage would be taken of that defect, while they only did what appeared to them to be good service to their country as well as to themselves; and what in their judgement would greatly distress the enemy."

The privateers Bellona, Mercury, and Porcupine arrived at Demerara on 21 February. Hornet joined them the next day. Two privateer schooners from Barbados, the Halton and the Polly, also joined the raid. British reports state they succeeded in bringing out from under the guns of shore batteries 15 prizes of a total tonnage of 4,098 tons (bm), and mounting 124 guns between them. (The privateers between them mounted some 118 guns and mustered a tonnage of about 800 tons (bm).) The largest vessel they brought out was the Boreas, 600 tons (bm) of Amsterdam. Privateers and prizes then left on 27 February.

They left behind four vessels, two of them American. As of 3 March there were also nine merchant vessels in the river at Essequibo.

Dutch reports agree on the losses but point out that the sole defensive structure at Essequibo, Fort Zeelandia, was in no state to be of any use and that the Council at Essequibo had given the commander, Captain Severyn, instructions to put up no more than a token resistance.

== Aftermath ==
On 27 February 1781 two sloops, HMS Barbuda (Commander Francis Pender), and HMS Surprize (Captain George Day), that Admiral Lord Rodney had sent appeared at Demerara. In March, the sloops accepted the surrender of "Colony of Demarary and the River Essequebo".

The vessels the privateers had captured became droits to the Admiralty as the privateers had had no commission to seize them.

From 2 February 1782 to February 1783 the French occupied the colony after compelling Governor Robert Kingston to surrender. At that time the French captured Barbuda and five other small British warships. The peace of Paris in 1783 restored the territories to the Dutch.

== Privateers ==
| Name | Master | Tons (bm) | Armament | Complement | Home port |
| Bellona | Patrick Driscoll | 150 | 26 × 12 & 6-pounder guns + 6 × swivel guns | | Bristol |
| Mercury | Robert Craggs | 200 | 24 guns, or 10 × 4-pounder guns + 8 × swivel guns | 100 | Bristol |
| Porcupine | J. Jackson | 90 | 18 guns, or 14 × 4-pounder guns + 6 swivel guns | 70 | Bristol |
| Hornet (built Bordeaux c.1777) | John Kimber | 350 | 22 × 24-pounder carronades (main deck) + 10 × 12-pounder guns (Fc) | 180 | Bristol, or Liverpool |
| Halton | Oden Whitehouse | | 8 guns | | Barbados |
| Polly | Newbold | | 4 guns | | Barbados |

The first Dutch report of the privateers stated that the squadron consisted of two 3-masted ships, a brig, and two schooners. A letter from the privateers calling for the surrender of the colony bears the names of four captains, with the names being at variance to those in the table above: "Wm. Maclure, Robert Boreal, Fil. Hardy, and Benj. Wenbold". The names of the masters in the table and most of the ship details are consistent with those in the Remembrancer.

== Captured vessels ==
The table below lists 14 vessels that the privateers captured at the mouth of the Demerara River. This list appears to be missing a vessel of 200 tons and 12 guns, given the discrepancy between the numbers in the table and the total tons and armament that Damer Powell reported.

| Name | Master | Tons (bm) | Armament | Complement | Cargo | Home port |
| Guidl. Vreight | Christ. Catnea | 200 | 12 guns | 32 | Coffee, sugar, & cotton | Flushing |
| Eansesindgheyd | Andrew Chris. Denta | 400 | 10 guns | 26 | Flour & lumber | Middleburg |
| Vreede | John Deweades | 120 | 4 guns | 26 | Coffee & sugar | Amsterdam |
| de Vrouguer, An. Colyns and Ana Maria | Mart. Sclossen | 206 | 8 guns | 18 | Coffee, cotton, & sugar | Amsterdam |
| Young Aaron | J.A. Ruge | 152 | 6 guns | 14 | | Amsterdam |
| De Boreas | Jean Ricart | 600 | 10 guns | 26 | Provisions, iron, & lumber | Amsterdam |
| Yofrowd Ana Louisa | Tunis Sweeris | 400 | 12 guns | 20 | Planks and bricks | Amsterdam |
| Zeelente Poost | Cornelius Keifer | 180 | 6 guns | 12 | Coffee and sugar | Amsterdam |
| Haast U. Lang Seam Jonge Juff. Margarete | Cornelius Van Kakum | 250 | 12 guns | 37 | Sugar, coffee, and cotton | Middleburg |
| Middleburg Hope | Hans Zuidella | 400 | 12 guns | 24 | Sugar, coffee, & cotton | Middleburg |
| ship | Barnes | 350 | 8 guns | 20 | Coffee, cotton, & sugar | Amsterdam |
| De Vreheyd | Petterse | 350 | 8 | 32 | Sugar, coffee, cotton | Middleburg |
| snow | Oudman, Zwartje | 200 | 4 guns | 16 | Provisions and planks | Rotterdam |
| schooner | | 90 | | 8 | Timber | St Eustatius |
