= Armand de Kersaint =

French Navy officer and politician (1742–1793)

Armand-Guy-Simon de Coetnempren comte de Kersaint
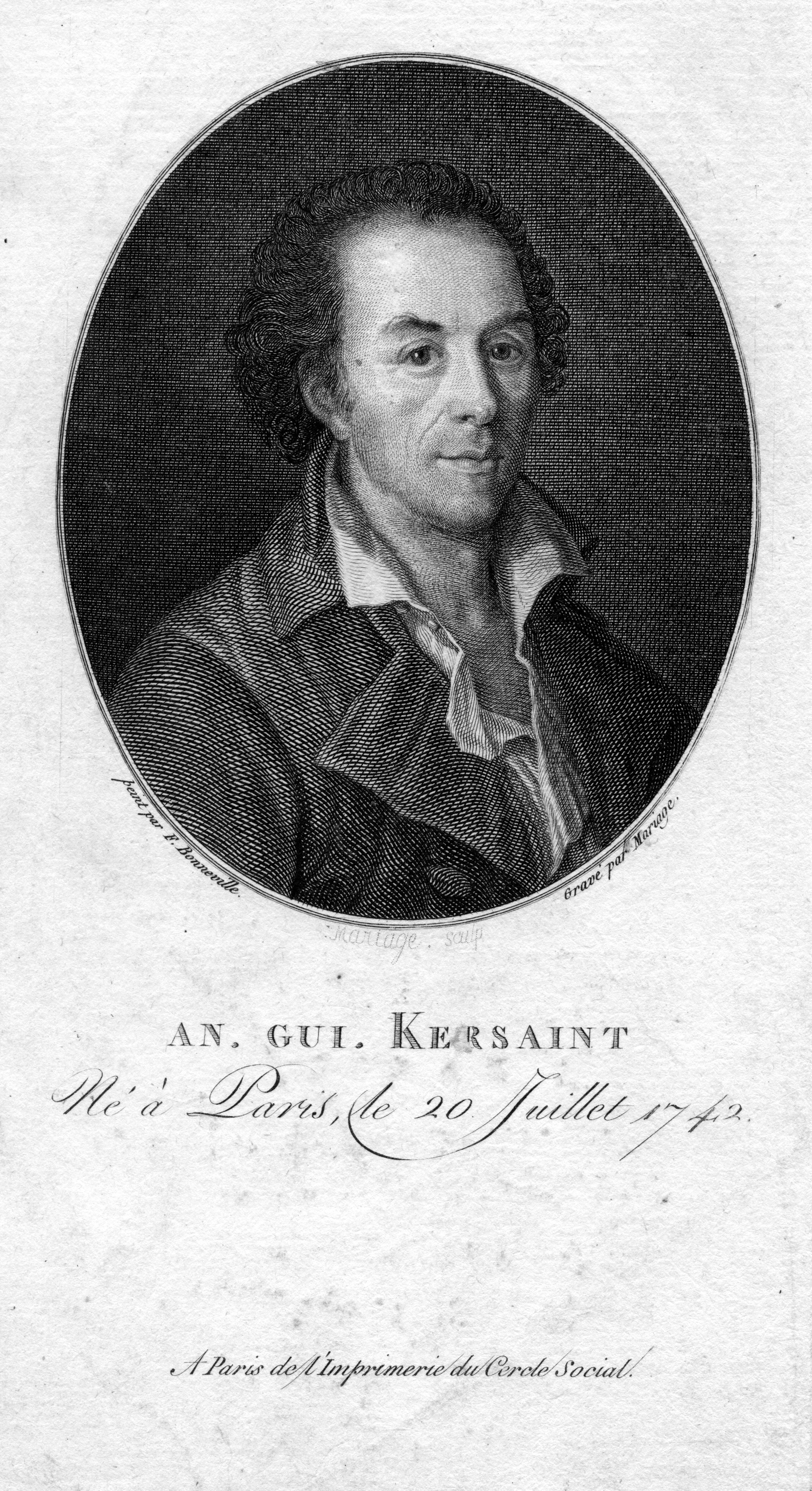
- Armand-Guy-Simon de Coetnempren, comte de Kersaint

Deputy to the National Convention
- In office September 1792 – 20 January 1793
- Constituency: Seine-et-Oise

Member of the Legislative Assembly
- Constituency: Seine

Administrator of the département of the Seine
- In office 4 January 1791 – ?

Personal details
- Born: 29 July 1742 Paris, Kingdom of France
- Died: 4 December 1793 (aged 51)
- Party: Girondins

Military service
- Allegiance: Kingdom of France
- Branch/service: French Navy
- Years of service: 1755–1791
- Rank: Vice admiral
- Battles/wars: American Revolutionary War

Vice-Admiral Armand-Guy-Simon de Coetnempren, comte de Kersaint (29 July 1742 – 4 December 1793) was a French Navy officer and politician who served in the American Revolutionary War. During the French Revolution, he aligned himself with the Girondins and was executed by guillotine during the Reign of Terror.

== Early life and military career ==
Born in Paris, Kersaint came from a noble family; his father, Guy François de Coetnempren, comte de Kersaint, was a distinguished naval officer. Kersaint's brothers, Guy-Pierre (1747–1822) and Joseph Coëtnempren de Kersaint (1746–1797), also served in the French Navy and took part in the American Revolutionary War.

Armand de Kersaint joined the French Navy as a Garde-Marine on 5 September 1755. In 1757, while serving on his father's ship, he was promoted to Ensign for his bravery in action. He was promoted to Lieutenant on 1 February 1770, and to Captain on 13 March 1779.

In July 1778, as captain of the 32-gun Iphigénie, he captured the 20-gun British post-ship HMS Lively. In 1782 Kersaint led an expedition to capture the British-held Dutch colonies of Demerara, Essequibo, and Berbice.

At the outbreak of the Revolution, Kersaint embraced reform. He adopted the new ideas, and in a pamphlet entitled Le Bon Sens (a title inspired by Thomas Paine's Common Sense) attacked traditional privileges; he also submitted to the National Constituent Assembly a scheme for the reorganisation of the navy, but it was not accepted.

== Political career ==
=== Legislative Assembly ===
On 4 January 1791 Kersaint was appointed administrator of the département of the Seine by the electoral assembly of Paris. He was also elected as a deputé suppléant to the Legislative Assembly, and was called upon to sit in it in place of a deputy who had resigned.

His main objective became the realisation of the navy scheme which he had previously submitted to the Constituent Assembly. He understood this to be made possible only through a general reform of all institutions, and subsequently gave his support to the policies of The Mountain, denouncing the conduct of King Louis XVI, and, on 10 August 1792 (after the storming of the Tuileries Palace), voting in favour of his deposition.

Shortly after, he was sent on a mission to the French Revolutionary Army's Army of the Centre, inspecting Soissons, Reims, Sedan and the Ardennes. While on assignment, Kersaint was arrested by the municipality of Sedan, but was set free after a few days' detention. Back in Paris, he took an active part in one of the last debates of the Legislative Assembly, in which it was decided to publish a Bulletin officiel, a report continued by the National Convention, and known by the name of the Bulletin de la Convention Nationale.

=== National Convention ===
Kersaint was sent as a deputy to the convention by the département of Seine-et-Oise in September 1792, and, on 1 January 1793, was appointed Vice admiral. He continued to devote himself to questions concerning the navy and national defense, prepared a report on the British political system and the navy, and caused a decree to be passed for the formation of a committee of general defense, which after many modifications was to become the Committee of Public Safety. In January 1793, he had also had a decree passed concerning the navy. He had, however, entered the ranks of the Girondins, and had voted in the trial of the Louis XVI against the death penalty and in favor of the appeal to the people. He resigned his seat in the convention on 20 January.

== Arrest and execution ==
After the death of the king, his opposition became more marked; he denounced the September Massacres, but, when called upon to justify his attitude, confined himself to attacking Jean-Paul Marat, who had risen to immense popularity. Kersaint's friends attempted to obtain his appointment as Minister of the Marine, but he failed to obtain even a position as an officer in the French Navy.

He was arrested on 23 September at Ville d'Avray, near Paris, and taken before the Revolutionary Tribunal, where he was accused of having conspired for the restoration of the Bourbon Monarchy, and of having insulted national representation by resigning his position in the convention. Kersaint was arrested on 2 October 1793, sentenced to death on 4 December, and guillotined that very day.
