= HMS Ceres (1777) =

Sloop of the Royal Navy

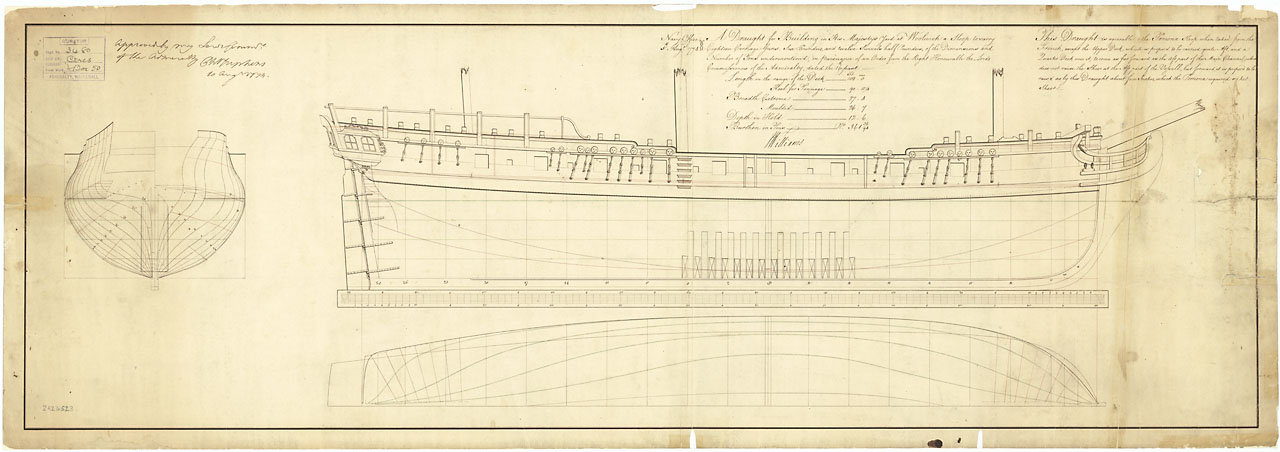
- HMS Ceres

History

Kingdom of Great Britain
- Name: HMS Ceres
- Namesake: Ceres of Roman mythology
- Ordered: 16 July 1774
- Builder: Nicholas Phillips, Woolwich Dockyard
- Laid down: 27 May 1776
- Launched: 25 March 1777
- Captured: December 1778

France
- Name: Cérès
- Acquired: December 1778 by capture
- Captured: April 1782

Kingdom of Great Britain
- Name: HMS Raven
- Namesake: Birds of the genus Corvus, particularly the common raven
- Acquired: April 1782 by capture
- Captured: January 1783

/France
- Name: Cérès
- Acquired: January 1783
- Fate: Sold 1791

General characteristics
- Displacement: 450 tons (French)
- Tons burthen: 361 26/94(bm)
- Length: 108 ft 0 in (32.9 m) (gundeck); 90 ft 11 1/4 in (27.7 m) (keel)
- Beam: 27 ft 4 in (8.3 m)
- Depth of hold: 12 ft 5 in (3.8 m)
- Sail plan: Sloop
- Complement: HMS Ceres:125; Cérès: HMS Raven:125; Cérès: 150
- Armament: HMS Ceres; Gundeck: 18 × 6-pounder guns; QD: 8 × ½-pounder swivel guns; Fc:4 × ½-pounder swivel guns; Cérès: 18 guns; HMS Raven; Gundeck: 14 × 6-pounder guns; QD: 8 × ½-pounder swivel guns; Fc:4 × ½-pounder swivel guns; Cérès: 18 × 6-pounder guns

HMS Ceres was an 18-gun sloop launched in 1777 for the British Royal Navy that the French captured in December 1778 off Saint Lucia. The French Navy took her into service as Cérès. The British recaptured her in 1782 and renamed her HMS Raven, only to have the French recapture her again early in 1783. The French returned her name to Cérès, and she then served in the French Navy until sold at Brest in 1791.

== HMS Ceres ==
Ceres was the only ship-sloop of her design. The British Admiralty ordered her in 1774 with the requirement that her design follow that of HMS Pomona, the 18-gun French sloop-of-war Cheveret, which the Royal Navy had captured on 30 January 1761 and that had disappeared, presumed foundered, during a hurricane in 1776.

Commander Samuel Warren commissioned Ceres in March 1777. In September, Commander James Dacres replaced Warren. Dacres sailed to the West Indies, arriving in December.

On 4 February 1778 she captured schooner "Betsy" 3-4 leagues off St. Eustasia. On 6 February she captured letter of marque sloop "Sally" off St. Bartholomew Island. On 25 February she captured sloop "Three Friends" in the Anegada Passage.

On 9 March, near Barbados, Ariadne and Ceres encountered two vessels belonging to the Continental Navy, Raleigh and Alfred. When the American ships attempted to flee, Alfred fell behind her faster consort. Shortly after noon the British men-of-war caught up with Alfred and forced her to surrender after a half an hour's battle. Her captors described Alfred as being of 300 tons and 180 men, and under the command of Elisha Hinsman.

On 24 March west of Barbados, Ariadne and Ceres captured the brig Fair Trade.

On 18 October 1778, Ceres captured the French privateer Tigre.

A little over a month later, on 17 December 1778, the French captured Ceres off St Lucia. Ceres was escorting a convoy of transports at the time, and Dacres acted to decoy the French 50-gun ship of the line Sagittaire and frigate Iphigénie away from the convoy, which Dacres sent on to Saint Lucia. After a chase of 48 hours, Dacres was forced to strike to Iphigénie as Sagittaire was only three miles (5 kilometres) astern and closing.

The British fleet under Admiral Barrington that had captured St Lucia, captured the American privateer Bunker Hill on 22 December 1778. Barrington decided to take her into service as HMS Surprize as she was a fast sailer and he had just been informed that the French had captured Ceres. Barrington also arranged an exchange of prisoners with the French, the crew of Bunker Hill for the crew of Ceres. Dacres subsequently returned to England.

== Cérès ==
The French Navy coppered Cérès after they captured her. She came to be known as Petite Cérès to distinguish her from the French 32-gun frigate Cérès launched in 1779 (and broken up in 1797).

In 1779, Cérès was under the Marquis de Traversay. Under his command she seized numerous British transports. In October, Ceres participated in the attempt by French and Continental Army to retake Savannah. Despite the assistance of a French naval squadron commanded by Comte d'Estaing, the effort was a spectacular failure,

In 1780, Cérès was part of the fleet under Admiral the comte de Guichen. She participated in the battle of Martinique on 17 April, and in two subsequent fleet engagements on 15 and 19 May.

In September, Cérès arrived at Cadiz as a member of a squadron under Guichen that escorted 95 merchant vessels back from the West Indies. On 7 November, Admiral the Comte d'Estaing sortied from Cadiz with the Franco-Spanish fleet there. Cérès, under the command of Traversay, was in the Van Division. The fleet soon returned to port, not having accomplished anything.

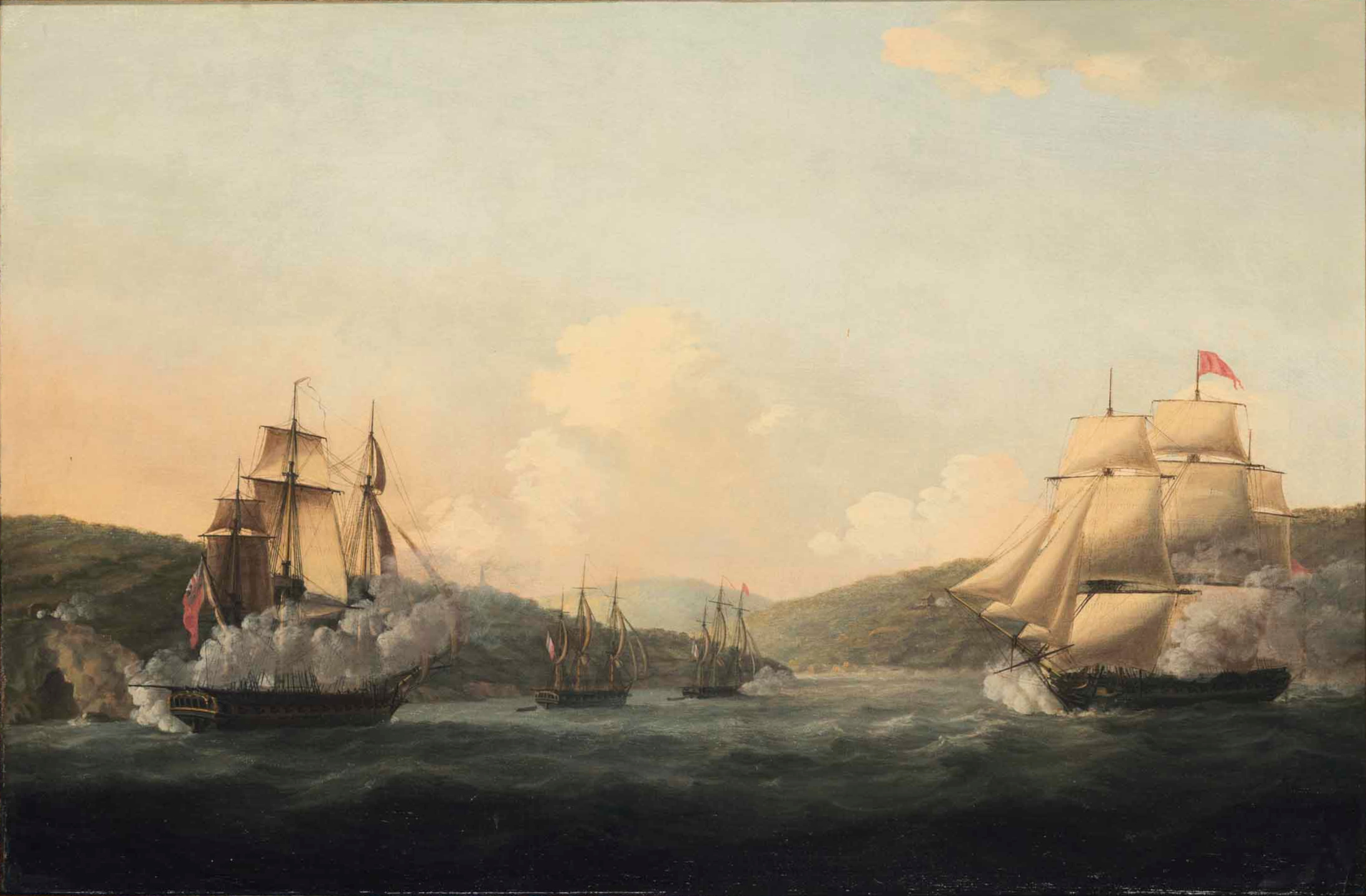
The capture of the 32-gun French frigate Amiable and the corvette Ceres after their encounter with Sir Samuel Hood in the Barfleur, with the Valiant and the Magnificent, in the Mona Passage, 19 April 1782

In the wake of the battle of the Saintes (took place 9–12 April 1782), Admiral Rodney detached HMS Champion, under the command of Captain Alexander Hood. Champion, became part of a squadron under Alexander Hood's brother, Sir Samuel Hood.

Cérès, under the command of Baron de Peroy, departed Guadeloupe on 15 April 1782. On 19 April the British squadron sighted five small French warships and gave chase to them, capturing four, including Cérès. (Peroy became friends with his captor, Alexander Hood. After the war Hood visited Peroy in France.)

Because the Royal Navy had a new HMS Ceres, a 32-gun fifth rate launched in 1781, the Royal Navy renamed their capture HMS Raven.

== HMS Raven ==
Between June and September 1782, Raven was at Plymouth, undergoing fitting. This included coppering.

In July 1782, Commander William Domett commissioned Raven. On 9 September Commander John Wells replaced Domett. At some point Wells sailed Raven to the West Indies.

On 5 January 1783, Raven was in company with the 74-gun Hercules off Montserrat when they sighted a strange sail. Raven sailed to investigate, but the strange vessel turned out to be a British merchantman, as did another. By this time Raven was well out of sight of Hercules.

That evening and the next day there was no wind. At about 10a.m. on the morning of 7 January, Raven sighted two frigates sailing towards her from the direction of Guadeloupe. Raven initially sailed towards them until she realized that they were not British. They were in fact the French frigates Nymphe and Concorde.

An all-day chase ensued until about 9 p.m. when one of the frigates got within pistol-shot and fired a broadside that shot away Raven's main topgallant-mast. The chase continued until about 10:30 p.m. when one of the frigates was again in range, with the other coming up rapidly. At this point Raven, which was under the command of Commander John Wells, struck. The French Navy took Raven into service under the name Cérès. Wells and his crew remained prisoners of war until the end of the war a few months later.

== Cérès ==
The French Navy returned Raven to her earlier name, Cérès.

== Fate ==
The French Navy sold Cérès at Brest in 1791.
