= Guy-Pierre de Kersaint =

Prefect of the département of Meurthe
- In office 1815–1816

Personal details
- Born: 26 November 1747 Brest, France
- Died: 24 August 1822 (aged 74) Suresnes, France
- Parent: Guy François Coëtnempren de Kersaint (father)
- Relatives: Armand-Guy-Simon de Coetnempren, comte de Kersaint

Military service
- Branch/service: French Navy
- Rank: contre-amiral
- Battles/wars: American Revolutionary War

Guy Pierre de Coëtnempren, comte de Kersaint (26 November 1747 – 24 August 1822) was a French Navy officer, brother of Navy officer and politician Armand-Guy-Simon de Coetnempren, comte de Kersaint. He took part in the American War of Independence.

== Biography ==
He did not accept the principles of the French Revolution, so he emigrated. He was restored to his rank in the French Navy in 1803, and died in 1822, after having been prefect maritime of Antwerp, and prefect of the département of Meurthe.

== Notes, citations, and references ==
Notes

Citations

References

- Levot, Prosper (1852). Biographie bretonne: recueil de notices sur tous les Bretons qui se sont fait un nom (in French). Vol. 2. Caudran.
