= Kersaint-Plabennec =

Kersaint-Plabennec Kersent-Plabenneg
- Commune
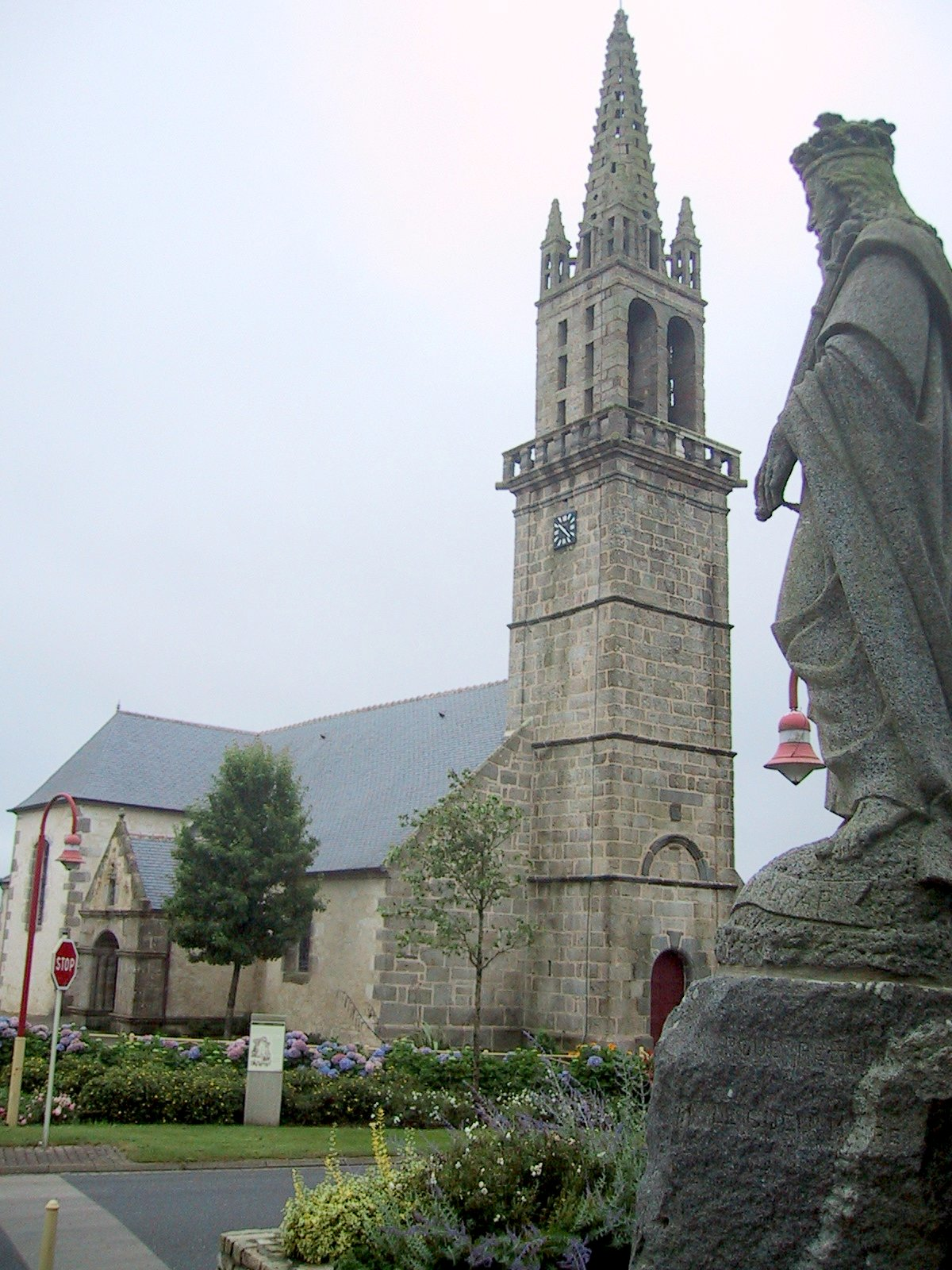
- The church in Kersaint-Plabennec
- Location of Kersaint-Plabennec
- Location within France Location within Brittany
- Coordinates: 48°28′24″N 4°22′23″W
- Country: France
- Region: Brittany
- Department: Finistère
- Arrondissement: Brest
- Canton: Plabennec
- Intercommunality: Pays des Abers

Government
  - Mayor (2020–2026): Patrice Boucher
- Area^{1}: 12 km^{2} (4.6 sq mi)
- Highest elevation: 121 m (397 ft)
- Lowest elevation: 48 m (157 ft)
- Population (2023): 1,571
  - Density: 130/km^{2} (340/sq mi)
- Time zone: UTC+01:00 (CET)
  - Summer (DST): UTC+02:00 (CEST)
- INSEE/Postal code: 29095 /29860
- ^{1} French Land Register data, which excludes lakes, ponds, glaciers > 1 km^{2} (0.386 sq mi or 247 acres) and river estuaries.

Kersaint-Plabennec (French pronunciation: [kɛʁsɛ̃ plabɛnɛk]; Breton: Kersent-Plabenneg) is a commune in the Finistère department of Brittany in northwestern France.

== Population ==
Inhabitants of Kersaint-Plabennec are called in French Kersaintais.

Historical population
| Year | Pop. | ±% p.a. |
|---|---|---|
| 1968 | 564 | — |
| 1975 | 550 | −0.36% |
| 1982 | 831 | +6.07% |
| 1990 | 1,001 | +2.35% |
| 1999 | 1,106 | +1.11% |
| 2007 | 1,252 | +1.56% |
| 2012 | 1,344 | +1.43% |
| 2017 | 1,447 | +1.49% |
| 2023 | 1,571 | +1.38% |
Source: INSEE

== See also ==
- Communes of the Finistère department
