= French frigate Iphigénie (1777) =

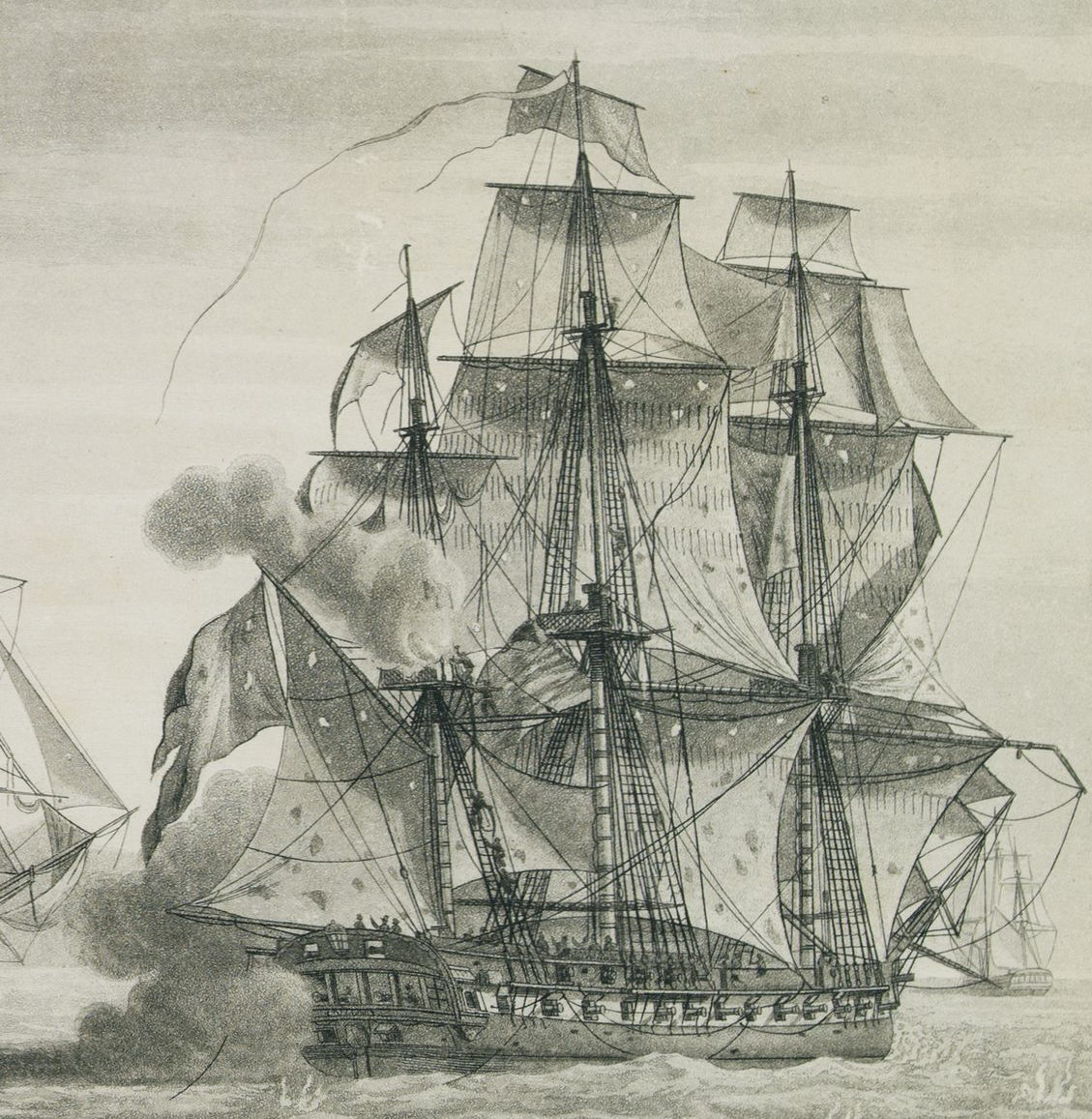
- Bellone, Iphigénie's sister ship

History

France
- Name: Iphigénie
- Namesake: Iphigenia
- Builder: Gilles Cambry, Lorient Dockyard, on the basis of plans by Léon-Michel Guignace
- Laid down: February 1777
- Launched: 16 October 1777
- Completed: March 1778
- Captured: By the British in August 1793

Great Britain
- Acquired: August 1793 by capture
- Captured: December 1793

France
- Name: Iphigénie
- Acquired: December 1793 by capture
- Captured: February 1795

Spain
- Name: Ifigenia
- Acquired: February 1795 by capture
- Out of service: 1818
- Fate: Wrecked

General characteristics
- Class & type: Iphigénie-class frigate
- Displacement: 1,150 tonneaux
- Tons burthen: 620 port tonneaux; 620 (bm)
- Length: 134 ft 0 in (40.8 m)
- Beam: 34 ft 6 in (10.5 m)
- Draught: 17 ft 6 in (5.3 m)
- Sail plan: Full-rigged ship
- Complement: 270-290
- Armament: 1778-92: 26 × 12-pounder long guns + 6 × 6-pounder long guns; 1792:As above + 1 or 2 mortars; 1794-5:As above, but with 2 × 36-pounder howitzers instead of the mortar(s)

Iphigénie was a 32-gun Iphigénie-class frigate of the French Navy, and the lead ship of her class. She was briefly in British hands after the Anglo-Spanish capture of Toulon in August 1793 but the French recaptured her December. The Spanish Navy captured her on 14 February 1795 at the Battle of the Gulf of Roses and subsequently commissioned her as Ifigenia. She continued to serve in the Spanish navy until being wrecked in 1818.

== Career ==
On 10 July 1777 Iphigénie, Captain Kersaint de Coëtnempren was part of the French fleet, under Louis Guillouet, comte d'Orvilliers. The fleet was in a fog and when the fog lifted, the French realised that a British vessel was among them. The French cutter Curieuse, of 10 guns and under the command of Captain Trolong du Rumain, chased HMS Lively and ordered her to lie to, which order Biggs declined. However, Iphigénie came up and ordered Biggs to sail Lively to the French admiral. Biggs was still arguing when Iphigénie fired a broadside. The broadside killed 12 British sailors; thereupon, Biggs struck. The French took Lively into service.

Between June and July 1778, Iphigénie was at Brest, being coppered. In December, Iphigénie captured the 18-gun sloop HMS Ceres off Saint Lucia. One year later Iphigénie took part in the Battle of Grenada.

On 26 April 1780 Iphigénie and Gentille captured HMS Fortune off Barbuda. The frigates belonged to Guichen's squadron.

In January–February 1782, French captain Armand de Kersaint led a squadron in Iphigénie that included two more frigates, four brigs, and a large cutter to recapture Demerara and Essequibo. The naval opposition consisted of a British squadron of three sloops and two brig sloops under the command of Commander William Tarhoudin in HMS Oronoque. The French were sighted on 30 January and Tarhoudin moved his squadron downriver. However, the French landed troops and as these moved towards Demerara, the British forces facing them retreated, forcing Tarhoudin to pull back his vessels also. On 1 February the British asked for terms of capitulation, with the actual capitulation taking place on 3 February.

Between November 1783 and January 1784, Iphigénie underwent repair and refitting at Martinique.

In August 1793 the British captured her at Toulon. In September they added mortars to her armament. When they left Toulon she was in the harbour awaiting repairs. They set fire to her, or at least believed that they had. However, the French returned her to service. Between January 1794 and May she underwent refitting and repair.

== Fate ==
On 14 February 1795, she was captured at the Battle of the Gulf of Roses by the Spanish ship of the line Reina María Luisa. The Spanish sailed her to Cartagena and commissioned her into the Spanish Navy as Ifigenia. She continued to serve in the Spanish navy until being wrecked in 1818.
