= Capture of Demerara and Essequibo =

Coordinates: 6°48′N 58°10′W

- Part of the American Revolutionary War and the Anglo-French War (1778–1783)
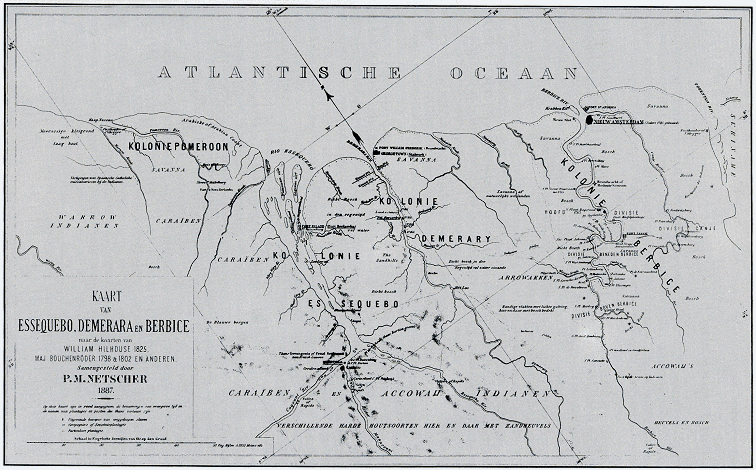
- Period map showing Dutch colonies in South America
Date	22 January 1782
Location	Demerara and Essequibo, South America
Result	French victory, French occupation of Demerara, Essequibo and Berbice until the Treaty of Paris (1783)

Belligerents
France	Great Britain

Commanders and leaders
Armand of Kersaint; Comte de Bouillé	Gov. Robert Kingston (surrendered)

Strength
Frigate Iphigénie; 4 Sloops; 355 men from the Régiment d'Armagnac and 1ére Legion (Volontaires Étranger de la Marine)	28th Regiment of Foot

Casualties and losses
Unknown, Minimum	3 sloops captured 2 brigs captured, 1 sunk 28th Rgt. surrendered

The capture of Demerara and Essequibo was a French military expedition carried out in January 1782 as part of the American Revolutionary War. In 1781 Admiral Lord Rodney sent two sloops from his fleet at Sint Eustatius to take possession of the Dutch colonies of Essequibo and Demerara. In 1782 the French successfully took possession of these settlements, compelling British Governor Robert Kingston to surrender. The Treaty of Paris in 1783 restored these territories to the Dutch.

== Background ==
In December 1780 Great Britain declared war on the Dutch Republic, bringing it formally into the 4th Anglo-Dutch War. In early 1781 a large British fleet under Admiral Lord Rodney was sent to the West Indies. After making seizures in the Caribbean islands, Rodney sent two sloops to take possession of the colonies of Essequibo and Demerara with little difficulty. The colonies had already de facto surrendered to six British privateer ships by the time the two naval vessels arrived. The governor, Van Schuilenburg, was not satisfied with Dutch protection and surrendered to the British, who found a rich booty in the colonies from the vast quantity of produce that had accumulated due to a lack of shipping.

== French capture ==
French naval captain Armand de Kersaint, with his 32-gun flagship Iphigénie, the 26-gun Aimable, and three lesser ships, arrived at Demerara with little opposition. A French force of 335 men from the Régiment d'Armagnac and the 1st Legion Volontaires étranger de la Marine launched an assault on the British garrison and compelled Gov. Robert Kingston and his detachment from the 28th Regiment of Foot to surrender. As a result, Essequibo and Berbice also surrendered to the French on 1 and 5 February.

The French seized five Royal Navy vessels: the 20-gun Orinoque (Commander William Tahourdin), 16-gun Barbuda (Commander Francis Pender), 18-gun Sylph (Commander Lawrence Graeme), 16-gun Stormont (Commander Christmas Paul), and 16-gun brig Rodney (Lieutenant John Douglas Brisbane).

== Aftermath ==
The Comte de Kersaint became governor of the three rivers and their settlements and inhabitants. To guarantee their conquest, the French began to construct forts at the mouth of the Demerara River, one on each eastern and western bank, and for that purpose, they compelled the planters to furnish slave labor. They also doubled the capitation tax, which burden was felt severely by the colonists. In 1783 the Treaty of Paris restored these territories to the Dutch. When Demerara surrendered to the French, the British naval commander in place signed the capitulation. Gov. Kingston's proposals for terms contained the following rather singular proposition:

"The Lieut.-Gov. for himself requires, that not having troops with him, he may be considered in a civil capacity, and at liberty to join and do duty with his Britannic Majesty's 28th Regt., of which he has the honor to be Lieutenant-Col."

To this the following answer was returned:

"Lt.-Gov. Kingston having retired himself to his Britannic Majesty's squadron, from whence he has made his particular proposals which were rejected, I cannot but consider him in a military capacity, jointly with the commander of the squadron."
