= Richard Rundle Burges =

British naval captain

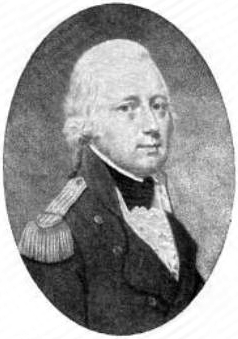
- Born: 10 September 1754
- Died: 11 October 1797 (aged 43); North Sea near Camperduin, Holland
- Military career
- Allegiance: United Kingdom
- Branch: Royal Navy
- Service years: 1782 to 1797
- Rank: Captain (Royal Navy)
- Conflicts: American Revolutionary War; Action of 18 October 1782; French Revolutionary War; Glorious First of June; Battle of Camperdown †

Captain Richard Rundle Burges (or Burgess; 10 September 1754 – 11 October 1797) was a Royal Navy officer noted for his actions in the Battle of Camperdown, where he perished while commanding HMS Ardent.

== Career ==
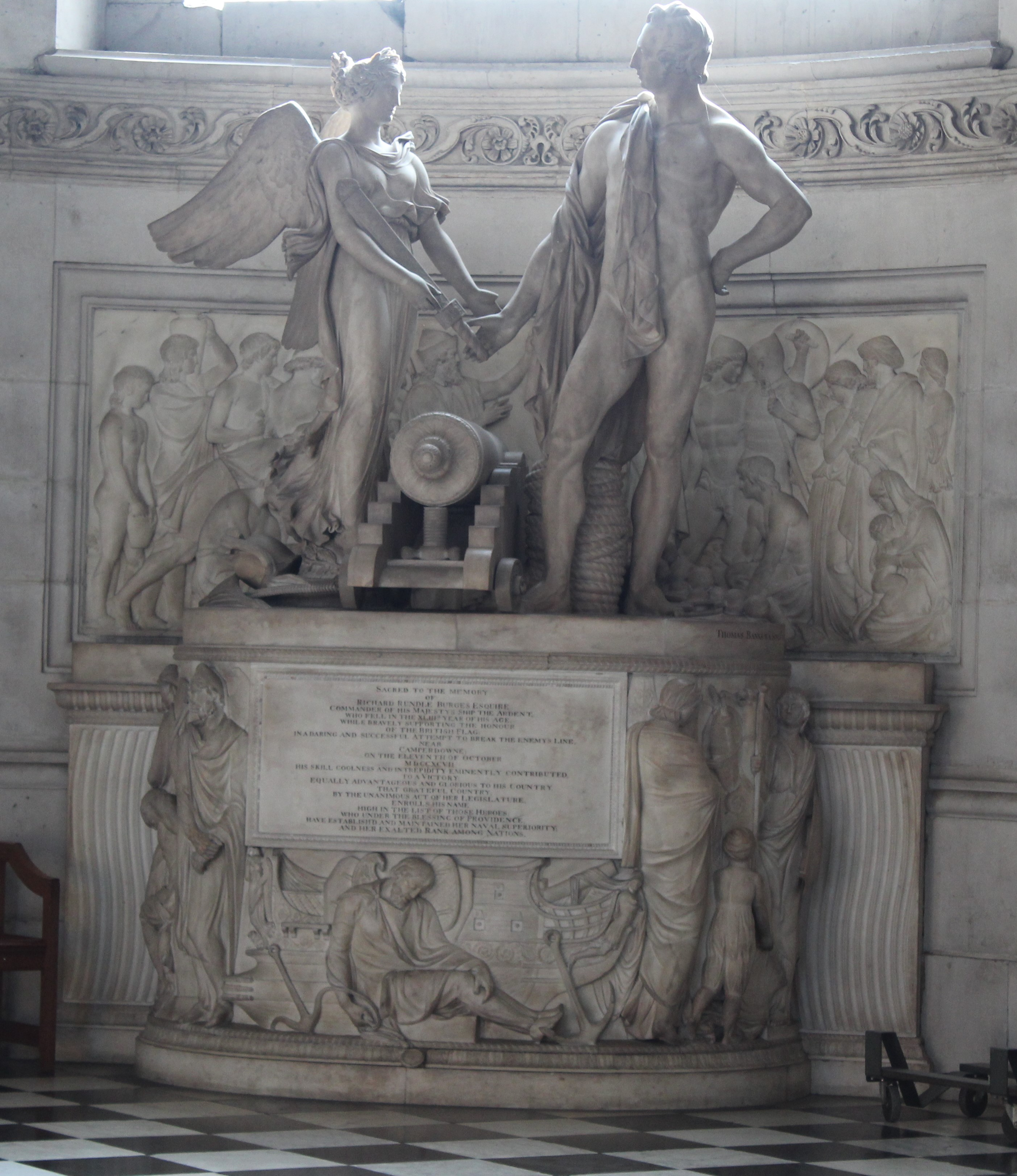
Burges monument, St. Paul's Cathedral

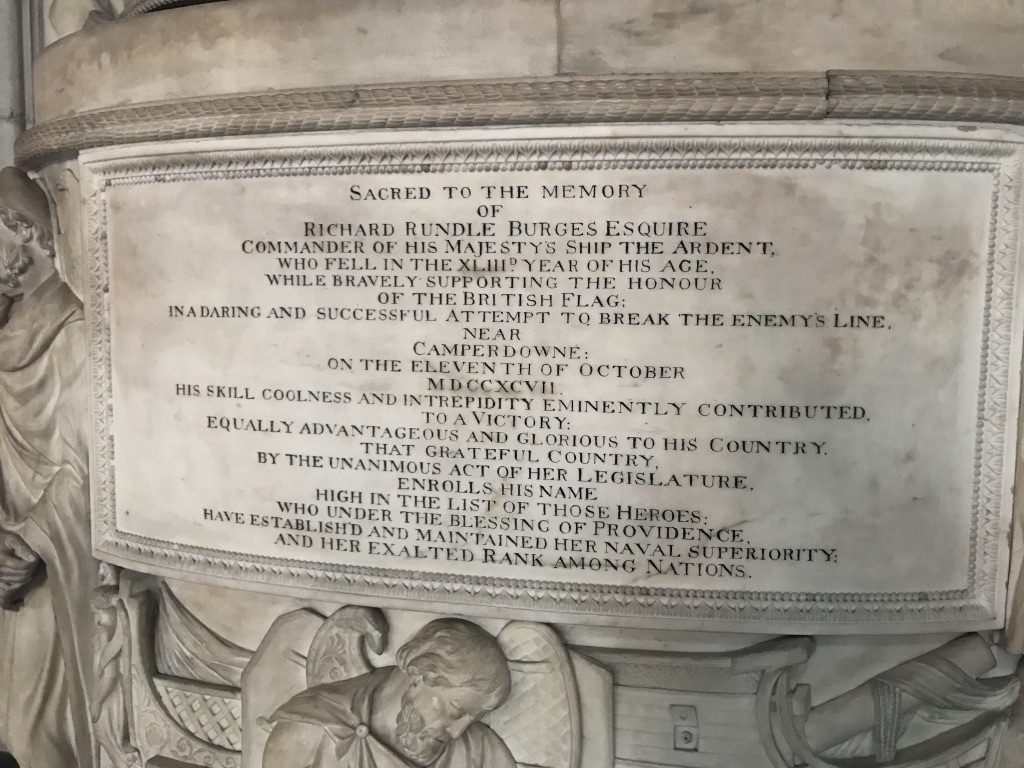
Inscription on monument to Burges in St. Paul's Cathedral

Burges was commissioned as a lieutenant in the Royal Navy on 21 November 1772. While serving on HMS London during the Anglo-French War, he was injured in the action of 18 October 1782 against the French ship Scipion.

=== As commander ===
Burges was posted as commander on 7 December 1782. He commanded a series of ships with this rank:

- HMS Keppel (7–15 December 1782)
- HMS Vaughan (15 December 1782 – 12 May 1783)
- HMS Savage (23 June 1786 – 13 Aug 1790)

=== As captain ===
The Commissioned Sea Officers of the Royal Navy listed Burges as a captain on 21 September 1790, after which he commanded a series of warships:

- HMS Ferret, 13 August – 20 September 1790
- HMS Culloden, 1794
- HMS Argo, 1 August 1794 – 2 January 1795
- HMS Ardent, 1797 – 11 October 1797

As captain of HMS Culloden, a 74-gun ship of the line, Burges participated in the Glorious First of June, where his ship suffered seven casualties (two dead and five wounded).

=== Battle of Camperdown and death ===
On 11 October, he participated in the Battle of Camperdown where he would lose his life. Serving under Admiral Adam Duncan, Burges and Ardent joined the northern of two divisions in the British fleet—including Duncan's flagship Venerable—which aimed for the Dutch flagship Vrijheid. When Venerable diverted south, Ardent attacked the larger Vrijheid alone. There she suffered more than a hundred casualties, including Burges himself, who was cut in two by a chain shot in the first ten minutes of battle. During the fight, Burges' men "fought like maniacs." Ardent suffered the most casualties of any British ship, over 12% of the total British losses in battle. In 1802, Burges was honored with a monument in St. Paul's Cathedral in London, documenting his action in the battle.
