= London-class ship of the line =

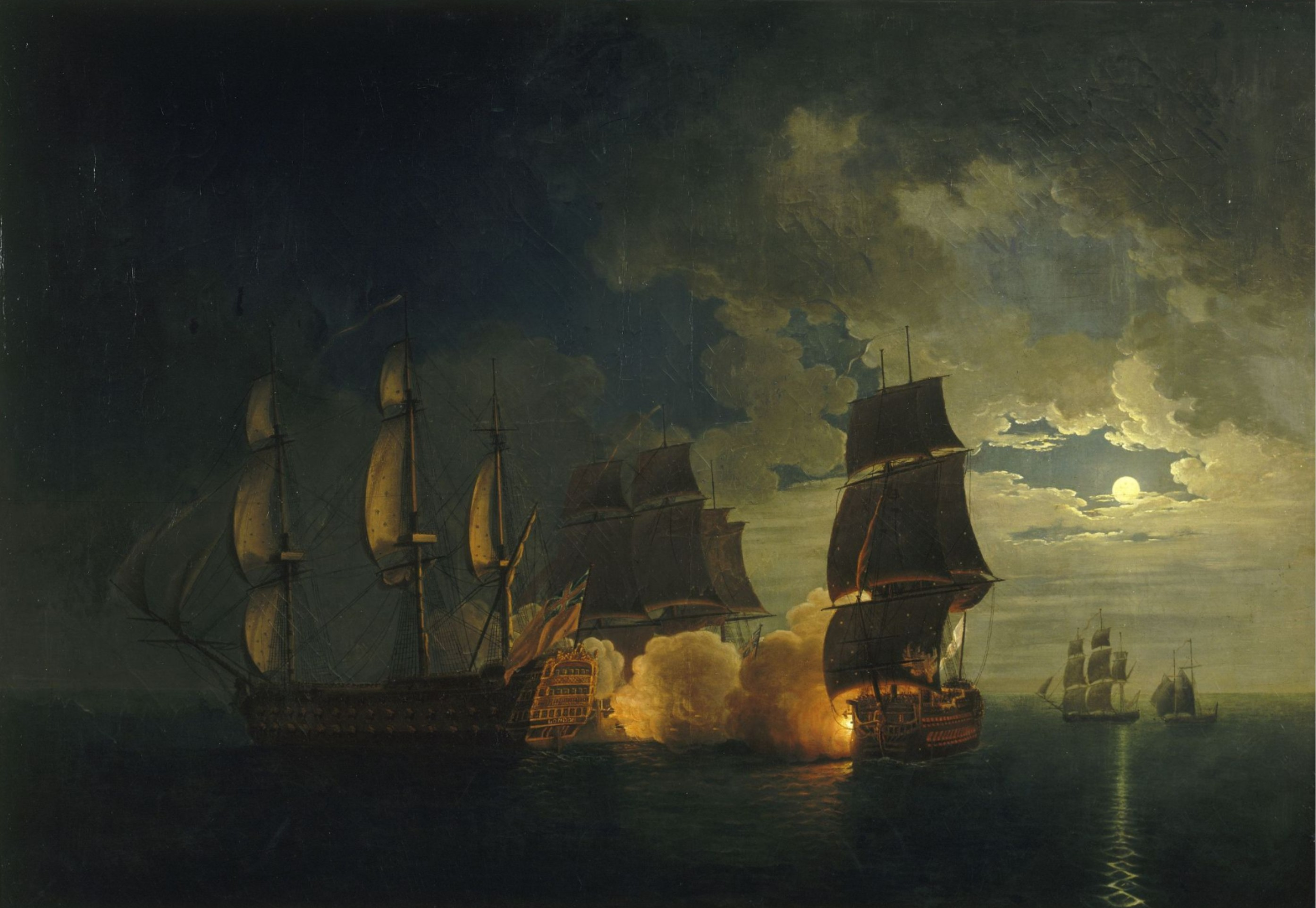
- HMS London (first from left) at the action of 18 October 1782

Class overview
- Name: London
- Operators: Royal Navy
- Preceded by: Sandwich class
- Succeeded by: Barfleur class
- In service: 24 May 1769 – 1839
- Completed: 4
- Lost: 1

General characteristics
- Type: Ship of the line
- Length: 177 ft 6 in (54.10 m) (gundeck); 146 ft 6 in (44.65 m) (keel)
- Beam: 49 ft (15 m)
- Propulsion: Sails
- Armament: 90 guns: Gundeck: 28 × 32 pdrs; Middle gundeck: 30 × 18 pdrs; Upper gundeck: 30 × 12 pdrs; Forecastle: 2 × 9 pdrs; 98 guns: Gundeck: 28 × 32 pdrs; Middle gundeck: 30 × 18 pdrs; Upper gundeck: 30 × 12 pdrs; Quarterdeck: 8 × 12 pdrs; Forecastle: 2 × 12 pdrs

The London-class ships of the line were a class of four second-rate ships of the line designed for the Royal Navy by Sir Thomas Slade.

== Design ==
The first ship of the class, London, was a 90-gun ship. When the second batch of three ships was ordered several years later, they were specified as being 98-gun ships. This was achievable without significant modifications to the design thanks to the earlier practice of not arming the quarterdecks of second rates, thus allowing for the addition of 4 guns per side.

== Ships ==
- HMS London

Builder: Chatham Dockyard
Ordered: 28 September 1759
Launched: 24 May 1766
Fate: Broken up, 1811

- HMS Prince

Builder: Woolwich Dockyard
Ordered: 9 December 1779
Launched: 4 July 1788
Fate: Broken up, 1837

- HMS Impregnable

Builder: Deptford Dockyard
Ordered: 13 September 1780
Launched: 15 April 1786
Fate: Wrecked, 1799

- HMS Windsor Castle

Builder: Deptford Dockyard
Ordered: 10 December 1782
Launched: 3 May 1790
Fate: Broken up, 1839
