= Nicolas Henri de Grimouard =

French Navy officer

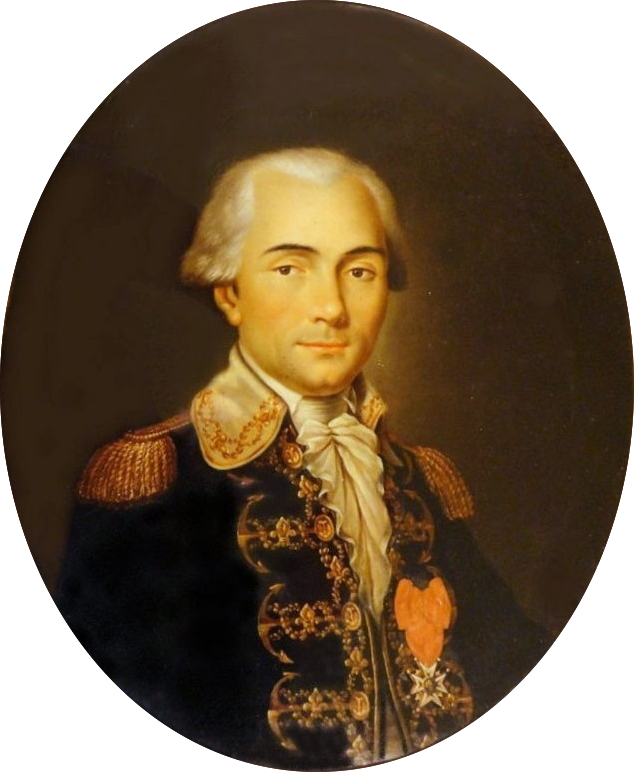
- Born: 25 January 1743; Fontenay-le-Comte, France
- Died: 7 February 1794 (aged 51) Rochefort, France
- Branch: French Navy
- Rank: Vice admiral
- Conflicts: American Revolutionary War; Battle of Grenada; Invasion of Tobago; Capture of Grenada; Battle of the Saintes; Action of 18 October 1782

Vice-Admiral Nicolas Henri René de Grimouard (25 January 1743 – 7 February 1794) was a French Navy officer. He served in the American Revolutionary War, and became a member of the Society of the Cincinnati.

== Career ==
Grimouard joined the French Navy as a Garde-Marine in 1758. He served on Inflexible in 1759 under Hubert de Brienne. In 1770, he was promoted to ensign, and to lieutenant in 1778. He took part in fixe cruises of the escadre d'évolution.

In 1779, Grimouard commanded the frigate Minerve. He captured the British ship Debora, and took part in the Battle of Grenada on 6 July 1779. That same year, he was made a Knight in the Order of Saint Louis.

In the action of 4 January 1781, Minerve was captured by HMS Courageux. Grimouard was wounded and taken prisoner, to be exchanged soon afterwards.

He took part to the invasion of Tobago and the capture of Grenada under François Joseph Paul de Grasse. At the Battle of the Saintes, on 12 April 1782, Grimouard was first officer on Magnifique, under Jean-Baptiste de Macarty Macteigue.

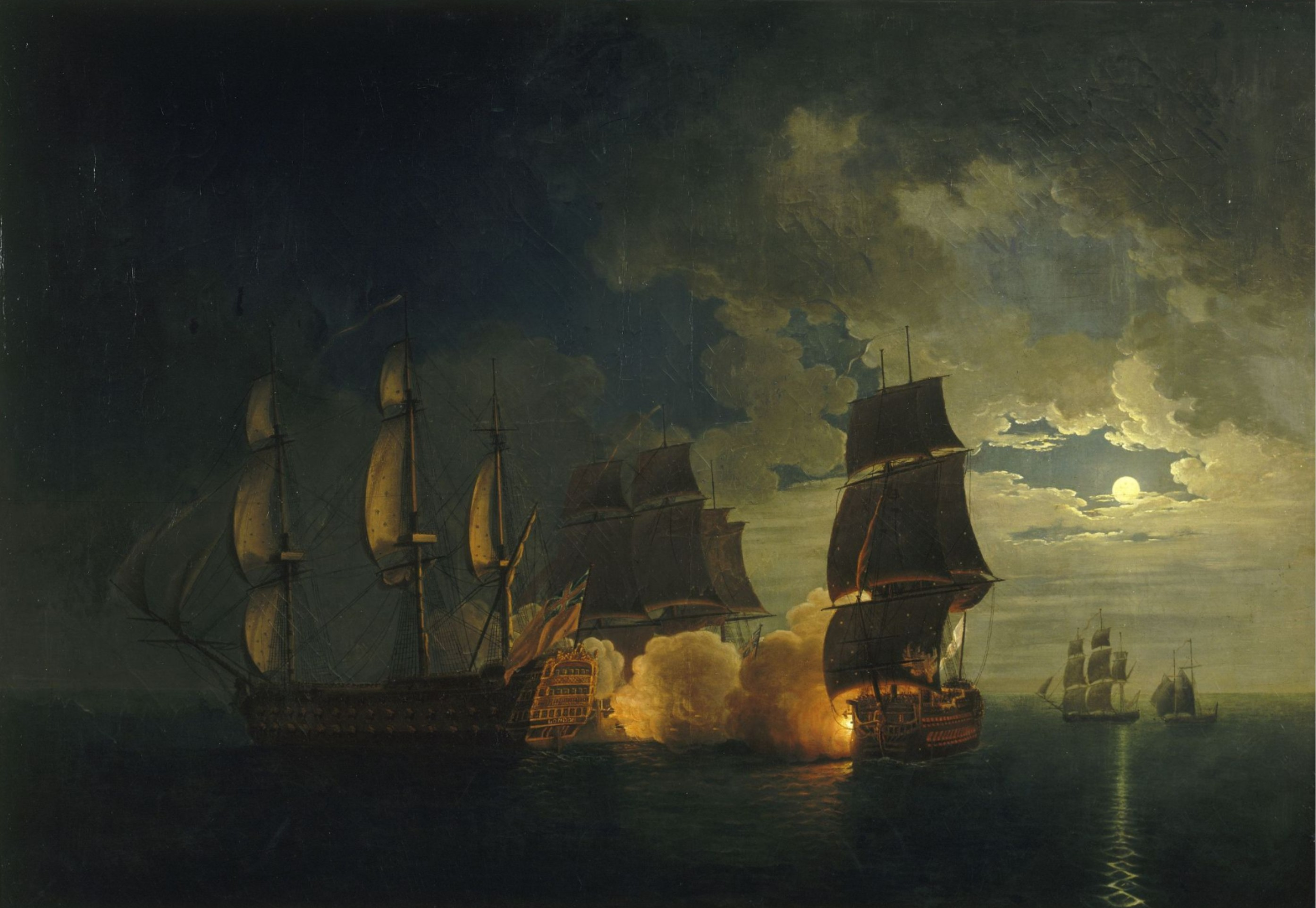
Rossel's depiction of the action of 18 October 1782, where Scipion battled HMS London.

He later took command of the 74-gun Scipion, and fought in the action of 18 October 1782, where he was wounded. Louis XVI made him a count after the battle, and commissioned a painting of the action from Auguste-Louis de Rossel de Cercy.

Grimouard was promoted to counter admiral in July 1792, and was appointed commander of the naval forces in Brest. In January 1793, he was promoted to vice admiral.

During the Reign of Terror in the French Revolution, Grimouard was guillotined in Rochefort on 7 February 1794.
