= HMS Formidable (1777) =

Ship of the line of the Royal Navy

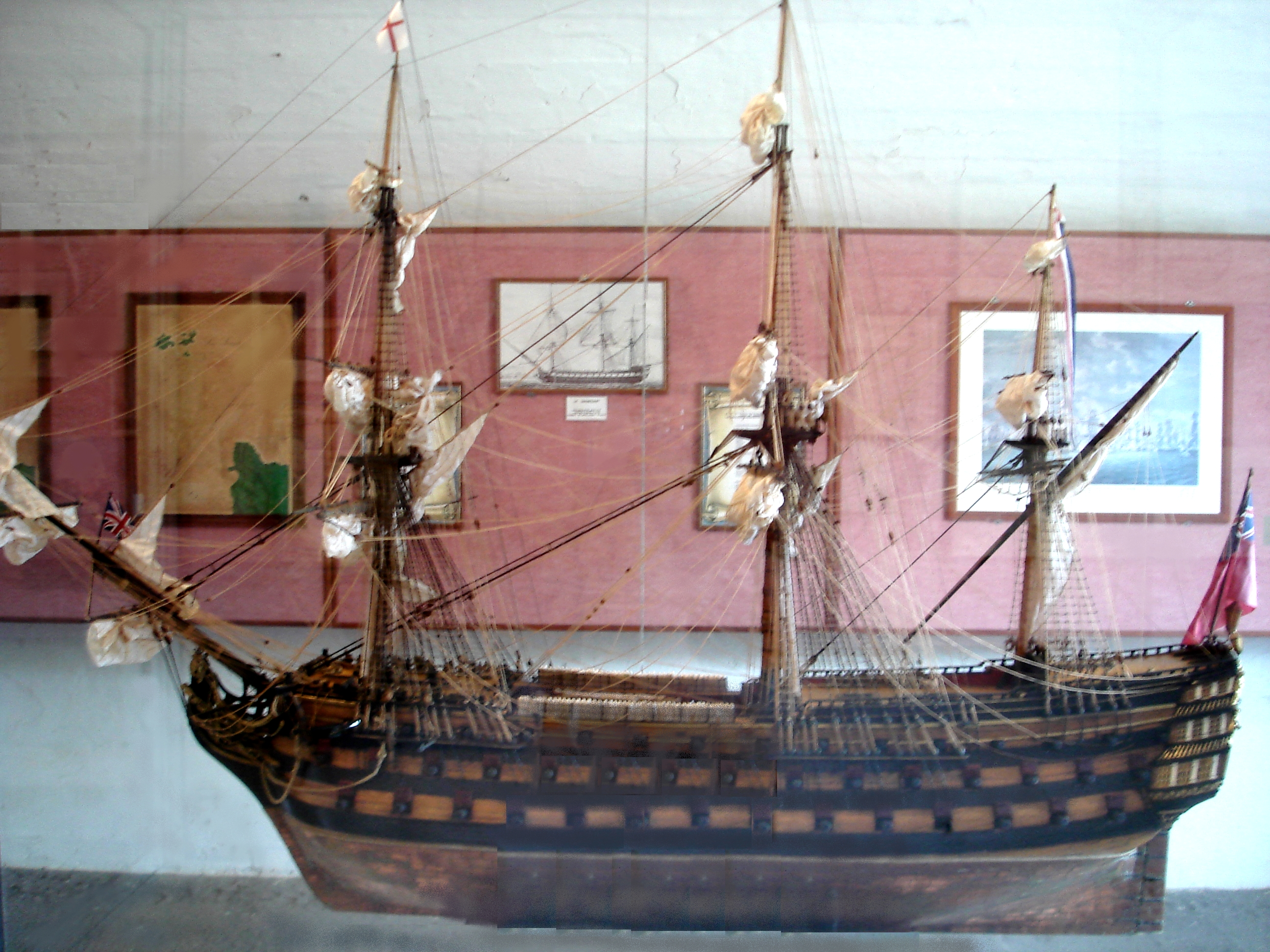
- Model of Formidable at Fort Napoléon des Saintes

History

Great Britain
- Name: HMS Formidable
- Ordered: 17 August 1768
- Builder: Chatham Dockyard
- Laid down: November 1768
- Launched: 20 August 1777
- Fate: Broken up, 1813
- Notes: Participated in: Battle of the Saintes

General characteristics
- Class & type: Barfleur-class ship of the line
- Tons burthen: 1934 (bm)
- Length: 177 ft 6 in (54.10 m) (gundeck)
- Beam: 50 ft 3 in (15.32 m)
- Depth of hold: 21 ft (6.4 m)
- Propulsion: Sails
- Sail plan: Full-rigged ship
- Complement: 750 officers and men
- Armament: 90 guns: Gundeck: 28 × 32-pounder guns; Middle gundeck: 30 × 18-pounder guns; Upper gundeck: 30 × 12-pounder guns; Forecastle: 2 × 9-pounder guns; 98 guns: Gundeck: 28 × 32-pounder guns; Middle gundeck: 30 × 18-pounder guns; Upper gundeck: 30 × 12-pounder guns; Quarter deck: 8 × 12-pounder guns; Forecastle: 2 × 9-pounder guns

HMS Formidable was a 98-gun second rate man-of-war serving the Royal Navy.

She was launched on 20 August 1777 at Chatham Dockyard. She had a fitted weight of 1945 tons. She was named after HMS Formidable captured at Quiberon in 1759 and broken in 1767.

During her career, her armament was increased to 98-guns.

== Battle of the Saintes ==
In March 1782, Formidable was stationed at Gros Islet Bay between the island of St. Lucia in the West Indies and Pigeon Island. It was under the command of Admiral Admiral Rodney, serving as his flagship at the head of 36 ship of the line. Meanwhile, the French admiral, Grasse, headed 34 ship of the line at Fort Royal Bay in Martinique (some thirty miles away). Rodney had been dispatched from Britain with 12 well-fitted ships to rescue the West Indies from a series of attacks from the French which had already resulted in the loss of several islands. They joined 24 ships on St Lucia which had already seen action against the French and were undergoing repairs.

The French had allies in the Spanish, who had 13 ship of the line at Cape Haitien in San Domingo. Together with transport ships the Spanish had a considerable force of 24,000 men. They awaited the arrival of a further 10,000 French troops dispatched from Brest, under escort of five men-of-war, to further boost their strength. The plan was that Grasse's fleet, with at least 5000 further troops, would unite with the Spanish at Cape Haitien, and from there would attack and capture the island of Jamaica with their conjoined armada of some 60 ships and some 40,000 troops. Rodney had been in communication with Grasse during March organising the exchange of prisoners, which were conveyed by HMS Alert under Captain Vashon. The two officers had much mutual respect. Rodney's task was to intercept the French fleet en route to Cape Haitien.

Grasse's vice admiral at the time was Louis-Philippe de Rigaud, Marquis de Vaudreuil. Third in command was Louis Antoine de Bougainville. The French flagship was the huge 104-gun Ville de Paris. The troops were under the command of the Marquis de Bouille. The Formidable was accompanied by three 98-gun ships: HMS Barfleur, HMS Prince George and HMS Duke plus the 90-gun HMS Namur. The remaining 31 ships ranged from 64-gun to 74-gun. In total the British armada had 2620 guns in comparison to the French having 2526, but the French armour was superior. Most of the British fleet was equipped with carronades on the upper decks, which had a major advantage of flexibility, and were a great advantage at close quarters. The Formidable had a crew of 900 of whom only two were declared unfit for service on the day, thanks to the ship's physician, Dr Blane.

Rodney's second in command was Admiral Samuel Hood. Third in command was Admiral Francis Samuel Drake who commanded the vanguard. Frederick Thesiger was Acting Lieutenant on board Formidable. The Formidable took chase on 8 April and located the French fleet during the night. In the morning the Formidable and the bulk of the fleet were becalmed and unable to reach Hood in the Barfleur and seven advance ships who were initially attacked by 15 French ships. A rise in the wind at noon on 9 April allowed the Formidable and around half the fleet to join the melee. During this period the Formidable lost 3 men, including Lt Hill, plus 10 wounded. A further rise in the wind allowed the remainder of the British fleet to approach, causing the French to retreat.

On 12 April Formidable was again involved in the Battle of the Saintes. Its gun decks were under the command of Sir Charles Douglas and Captain Thomas Symonds. Each gun was given 80 priming tubes (made of quills) and a pair of Kentish flints. Dr Gilbert Blane on the Formidable later wrote on the great beauty of the battle scene: stretching from the Soufriere region of Guadeloupe, to the island of Marie Galante and the huge volcanic summit of Diablotin on Dominica. The Formidable flew the White Ensign, Rodney being Admiral of the White. Her most important action was the breaking of the French line in the middle of the battle, and the final pursuit of the "Ville de Paris". In total she fired 80 broadsides during the battle, totalling 35 tons of shot. Her losses were relatively light given both the ferocity of the battle and the huge French losses: 14 killed and 39 wounded. After the battle she headed for Port Royal in Jamaica delivering the news of their salvation on her arrival on 29 April. She was broken up in 1813.

Gallery

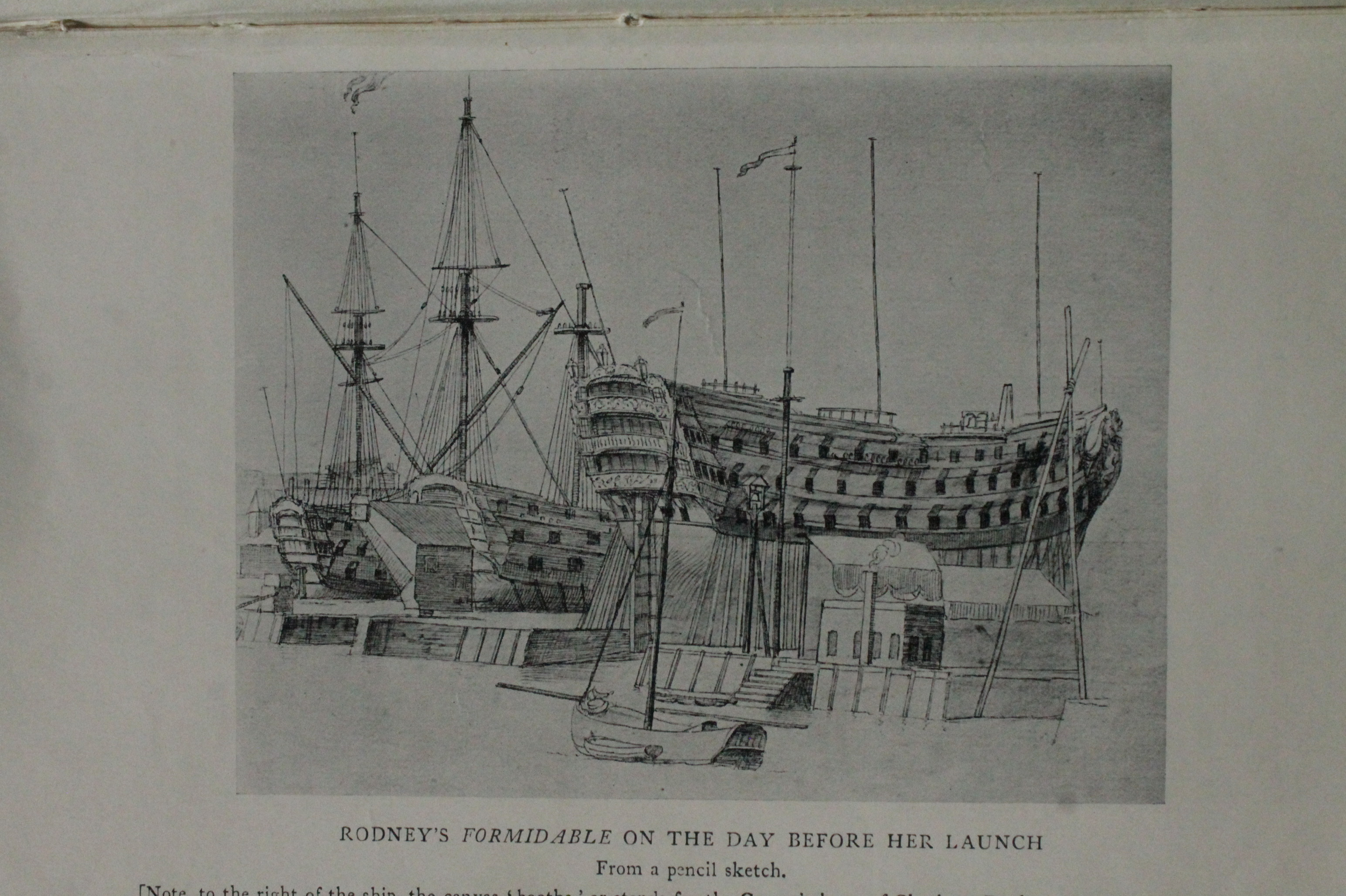
Sketch of HMS Formidable on the day before its launch 19 August 1777

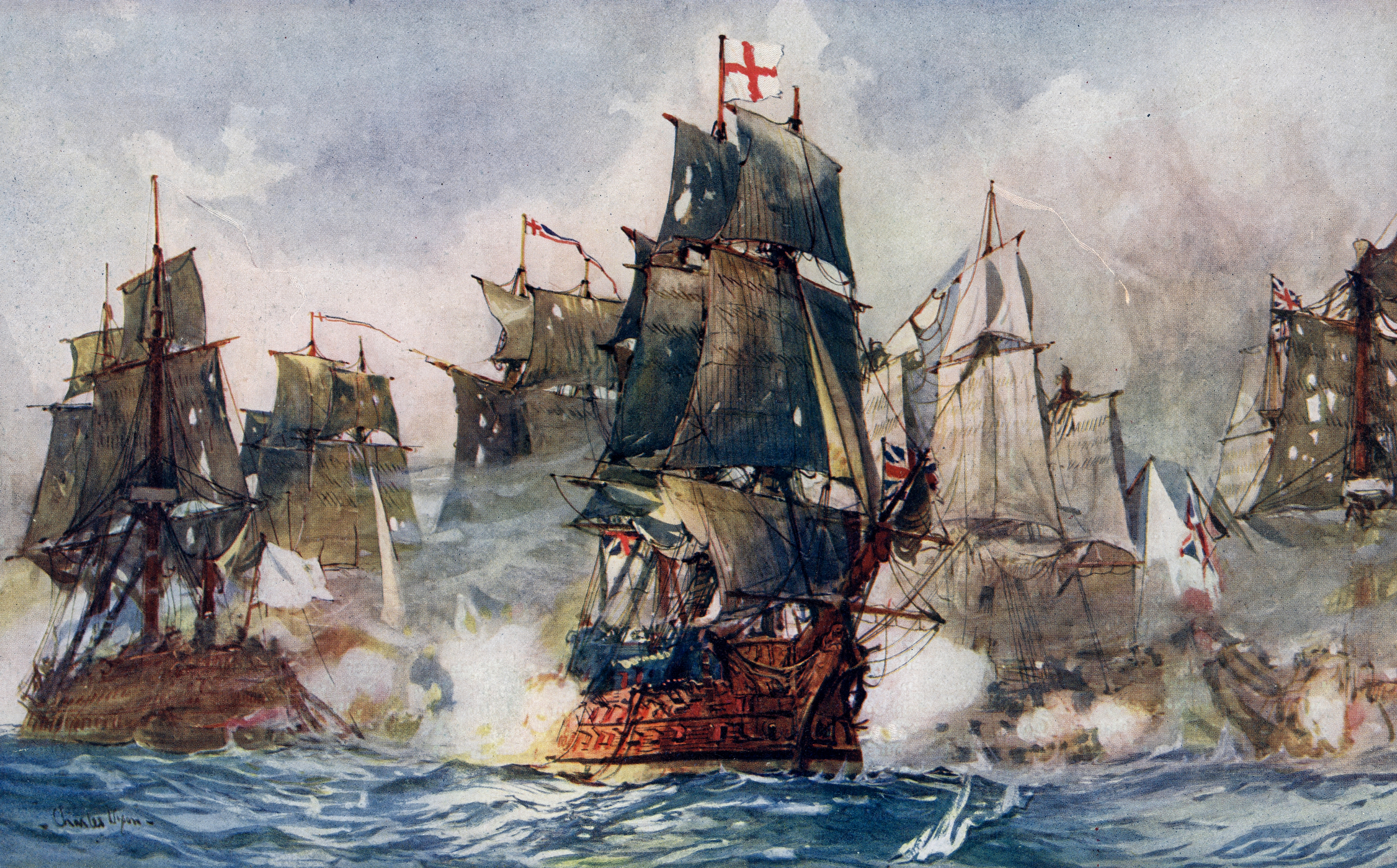
HMS Formidable breaking the line by Charles Edward Dixon

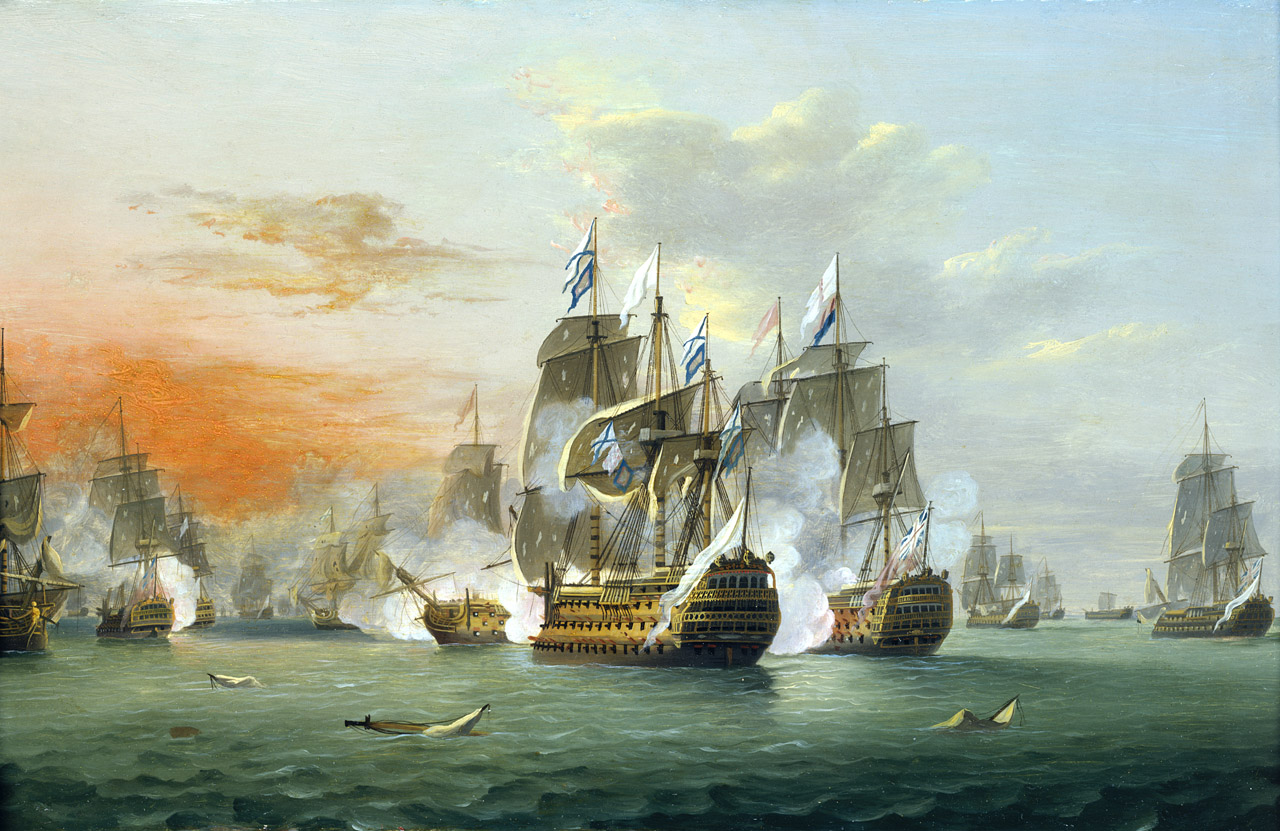
The Battle of the Saints, 12 April 1782, Formidable fires into Ville de Paris, centre of picture by Thomas Luny.
