= HMS Barfleur (1768) =

Ship of the line of the Royal Navy

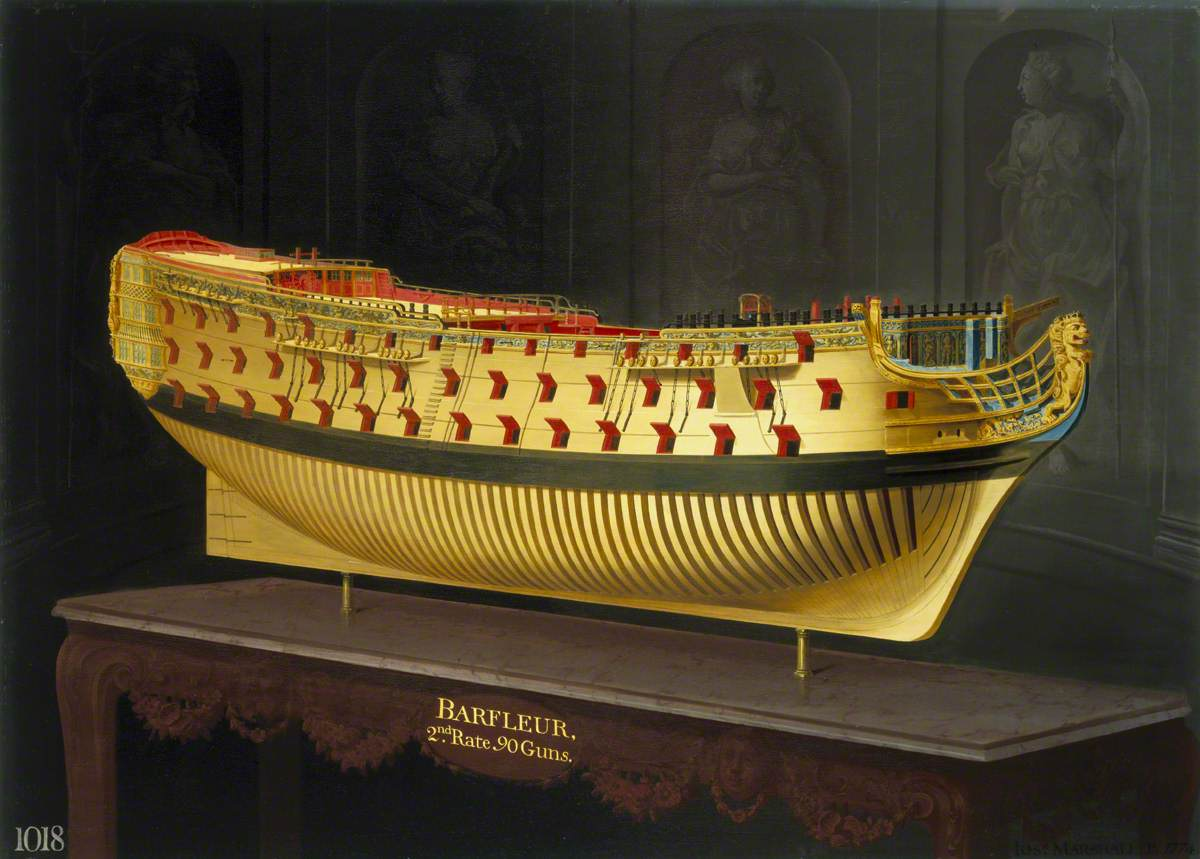
- Painting of a ship model of Barfleur

History

Great Britain
- Name: HMS Barfleur
- Ordered: 1 March 1762
- Builder: Chatham Dockyard
- Launched: 30 July 1768
- Fate: Broken up, 1819
- Notes: Participated in: Battle of the Chesapeake; Battle of St. Kitts; Battle of the Saintes; Battle of the Mona Passage; Glorious First of June; Battle of Groix; Battle of Cape St. Vincent; Battle of Cape Finisterre

General characteristics
- Class & type: Barfleur-class ship of the line
- Tons burthen: 1947
- Length: 177 ft 6 in (54.10 m) (gundeck)
- Beam: 50 ft 3 in (15.32 m)
- Depth of hold: 21 ft (6.4 m)
- Sail plan: Full-rigged ship
- Complement: 750 officers and men
- Armament: 90 guns: Gundeck: 28 × 32-pounders; Middle gundeck: 30 × 18-pounders; Upper gundeck: 30 × 12-pounders; Forecastle: 2 × 9-pounders; 98 guns: Gundeck: 28 × 32-pounders; Middle gundeck: 30 × 18-pounders; Upper gundeck: 30 × 12-pounders; Quarterdeck: 8 × 12-pounders; Forecastle: 2 × 9-pounders

HMS Barfleur was a 90-gun second-rate ship of the line of the Royal Navy, designed by Sir Thomas Slade on the lines of the 100-gun ship Royal William, and launched at Chatham Dockyard on 30 July 1768, at a cost of £49,222. In about 1780, she had another eight guns added to her quarterdeck, making her a 98-gun ship; she possessed a crew of approximately 750. Her design class sisters were the Prince George, Princess Royal, and Formidable. She was a ship of long service and many battles. In June 1773, King George III reviewed the British fleet at Spithead. Barfleur, under Captain Edward Vernon, was on this occasion the flagship of the fleet commander, Vice-Admiral Thomas Pye.

She distinguished herself as the flagship of Rear-Admiral Samuel Hood on the Leeward Islands station during the American War of Independence. Under Captain John Knight, she was flagship at the indecisive action of 28 April 1781 off Martinique against the French fleet of Rear-Admiral Comte de Grasse, at which Barfleur lost five men killed. She next took part in the battles of the Chesapeake, St. Kitts and the Saintes. At the Battle of the Chesapeake on 5 September 1781, under Captain Alexander Hood (later Lord Bridport), she was again the flag of Samuel Hood, second in command to Rear-Admiral of the Red Sir Thomas Graves. The battle was lost against the French under de Grasse, which had a profound effect on the outcome of the American war.

She saw further action in the French Revolutionary and Napoleonic Wars, taking part in Admiral of the Blue Richard Howe, Earl Howe's victory at the Glorious First of June as the flagship of Rear-Admiral (W) George Bowyer, with Captain Cuthbert Collingwood as his flag captain. In the battle she engaged the French Indomptable on 29 May and took a major part in the general action of 1 June, with a total loss of 9 killed and 25 wounded. She later saw action under Lord Bridport at the Battle of Groix. In 1797 she was with Admiral of the Blue Sir John Jervis at the Battle of Cape St. Vincent.

In 1805, under Captain George Martin, she was part of the Channel Fleet. Her final battle was fought in a squadron under Admiral Sir Robert Calder at the Battle of Cape Finisterre on 22 July 1805 in the attack on the combined Franco-Spanish fleet off Ushant. The action was fought in heavy weather, part of the time in thick fog. The master and four others were killed and Lieutenant Peter Fisher and six others were wounded.

In 1807 under Captain Sir Joseph Sydney Yorke she served in the Channel Fleet. In 1808, under Capt. D. M'Cleod, she served as the flagship of Rear-Admiral Charles Tyler and was engaged in the blockade of Lisbon and the escort to Plymouth of the first division of the Russian squadron commanded by Vice-Admiral Dmitry Senyavin. In 1811, under Captain Sir Thomas Hardy, she was engaged in actions in support of the army under Lord Wellington at Lisbon. After the conclusion of the Napoleonic wars, Barfleur spent some years in ordinary at Chatham, and was finally broken up there in January 1819.
