= HMS Neptune (1683) =

Ship of the line of the Royal Navy

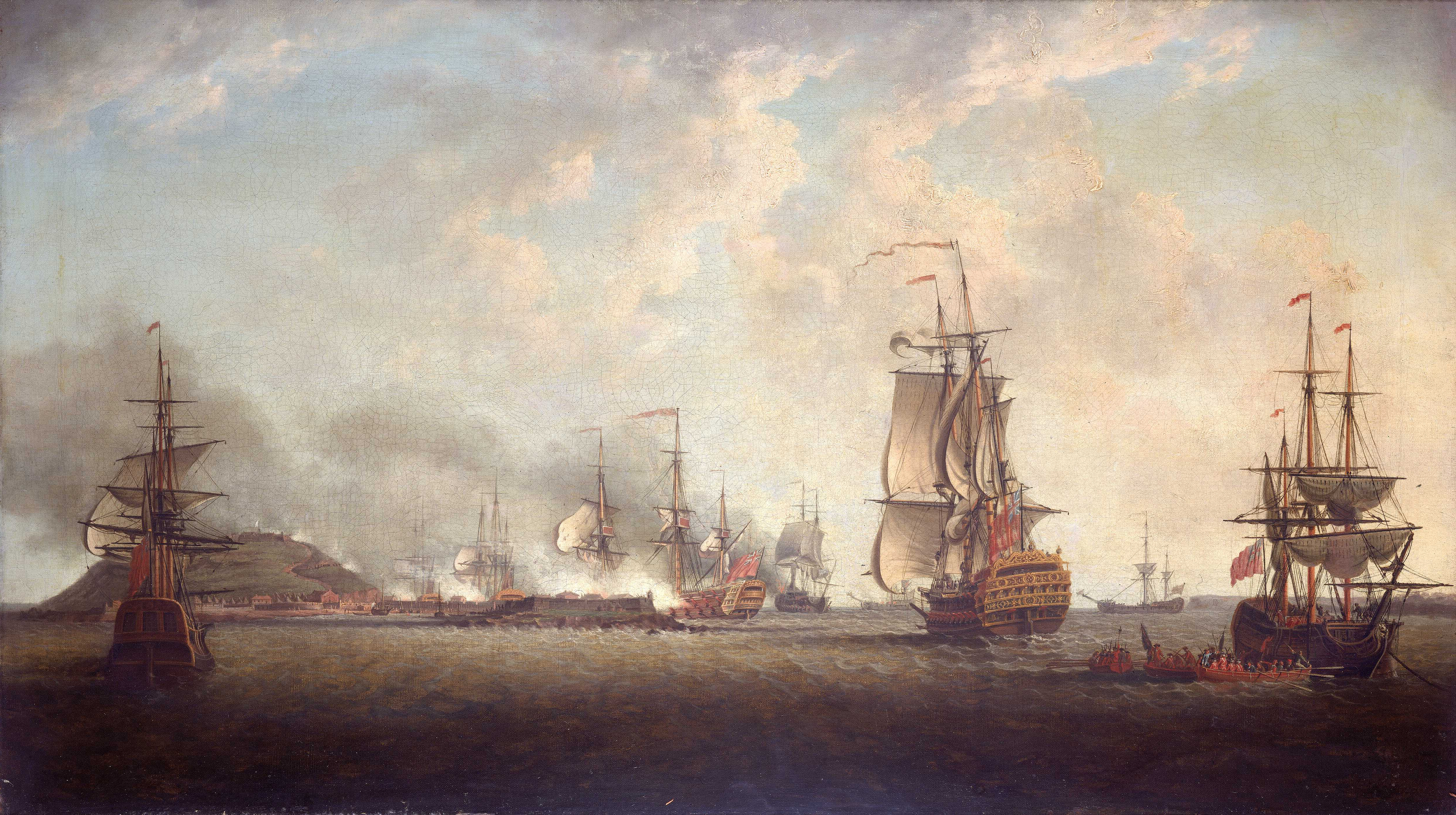
- Attack on Gorée, 29 December 1758. Torbay is at the very centre of the picture bombarding the mole of the fort on her port side

History

Great Britain
- Name: Neptune
- Ordered: 8 September 1678
- Builder: John Shish, Deptford Dockyard
- Launched: 17 April 1683
- Renamed: Torbay, 1750
- Fate: Sold, 1784

General characteristics as built
- Class & type: 90-gun second-rate ship of the line
- Tons burthen: 1,576 46/94 (bm)
- Length: 164 ft 0 in (50.0 m) (gundeck); 132 ft 5 in (40.4 m) (keel)
- Beam: 47 ft 3 in (14.4 m)
- Depth of hold: 18 ft 10 in (5.7 m)
- Sail plan: Full-rigged ship
- Armament: 90 guns of various weights of shot

General characteristics after 1710 rebuild
- Class & type: 1706 Establishment 90-gun second-rate ship of the line
- Tons burthen: 1,576
- Length: 163 ft 1.75 in (49.7 m) (gundeck)
- Beam: 47 ft 3 in (14.4 m)
- Depth of hold: 18 ft 6 in (5.6 m)
- Propulsion: Sails
- Sail plan: Full-rigged ship
- Armament: 90 guns: Gundeck: 26 × 32-pdrs; Middle gundeck: 26 × 18-pdrs; Upper gundeck: 26 × 9-pdrs; Quarterdeck: 10 × 6-pdrs; Forecastle: 2 × 6-pdrs

General characteristics after 1730 rebuild
- Class & type: 1719 Establishment 90-gun second-rate ship of the line
- Tons burthen: 1,572.5
- Length: 164 ft (50.0 m) (gundeck)
- Beam: 47 ft 3 in (14.4 m)
- Depth of hold: 18 ft 10 in (5.7 m)
- Propulsion: Sails
- Sail plan: Full-rigged ship
- Armament: 90 guns: Gundeck: 26 × 32-pdrs; Middle gundeck: 26 × 18-pdrs; Upper gundeck: 26 × 9-pdrs; Quarterdeck: 10 × 6-pdrs; Forecastle: 2 × 6-pdrs

HMS Neptune was a 90-gun second-rate ship of the line of the Royal Navy. She was built under the 1677 "Thirty Great Ships" Programme and launched in 1683 at Deptford Dockyard.

== Naval career ==
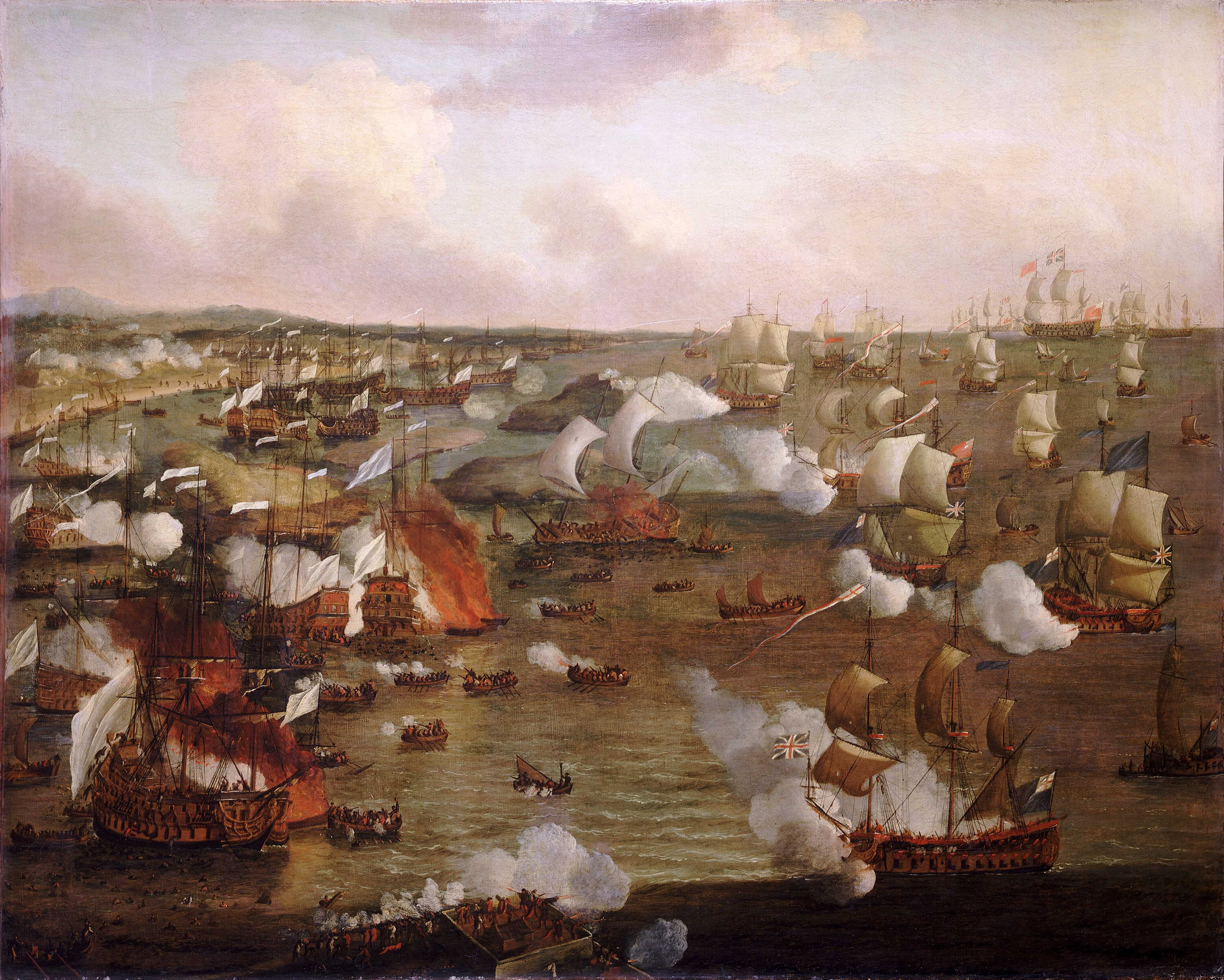
Neptune (far left foreground) attacking French ships at the Battle of La Hogue, 23 May 1692

She was first commissioned in 1690 under Captain Thomas Gardiner, as the flagship of Vice-Admiral George Rooke. In that capacity she took part in the Battle of Barfleur in May 1692.

She underwent her first rebuild at William Johnson's yard at Blackwall Yard, from where she was relaunched on 6 May 1710 as a 90-gun second-rate built to the 1706 Establishment. She was recommissioned on 3 February 1711 under Capt. Francis Wyvell, but paid off into reserve in July of that year and saw no service.

On 18 August 1724 Neptune was ordered to be taken to pieces and rebuilt as a 90-gun second-rate to the 1719 Establishment at Woolwich Dockyard, from where she was relaunched on 15 October 1730. She was cut down to a 74-gun third rate at Chatham Dockyard from 1747 to April 1749, and was renamed HMS Torbay on 23 August 1750, the previous ship bearing this name having been broken up in 1749.

=== Capture of Le Roche ===
On 28 November 1756, Torbay engaged and defeated the 22-gun French privateer La Roche off the southwest coast of Wales. All but two of the French crew were brought aboard the British vessel as prisoners; the remaining two men were left on La Roche with eight of Torbay's crew to help sail her into an English port as a prize. Torbay and La Roche then parted company, with the prize vessel heading for the port city of Milford Haven. On the second night of that voyage the two Frenchmen broke out of their cabin and attacked the British sailors, killing one and wounding the others. The seven surviving British men surrendered and were imprisoned on the steerage deck while the French attempted to turn the vessel back towards the French coast.

By the following morning the British had developed a plan for escape; with some effort a hole was made in the hull and one sailor climbed the outside of the ship, re-entering at the gundeck. Obtaining a musket, he shot dead one of the French; the other leapt overboard but was persuaded to return to the vessel on a promise of being spared. Again in command of the vessel, the Torbay crewmembers then reset course for Milford Haven. On 3 December they fell in with HMS Lyme, whose crew assisted in bringing the captured ship into port ten days later.

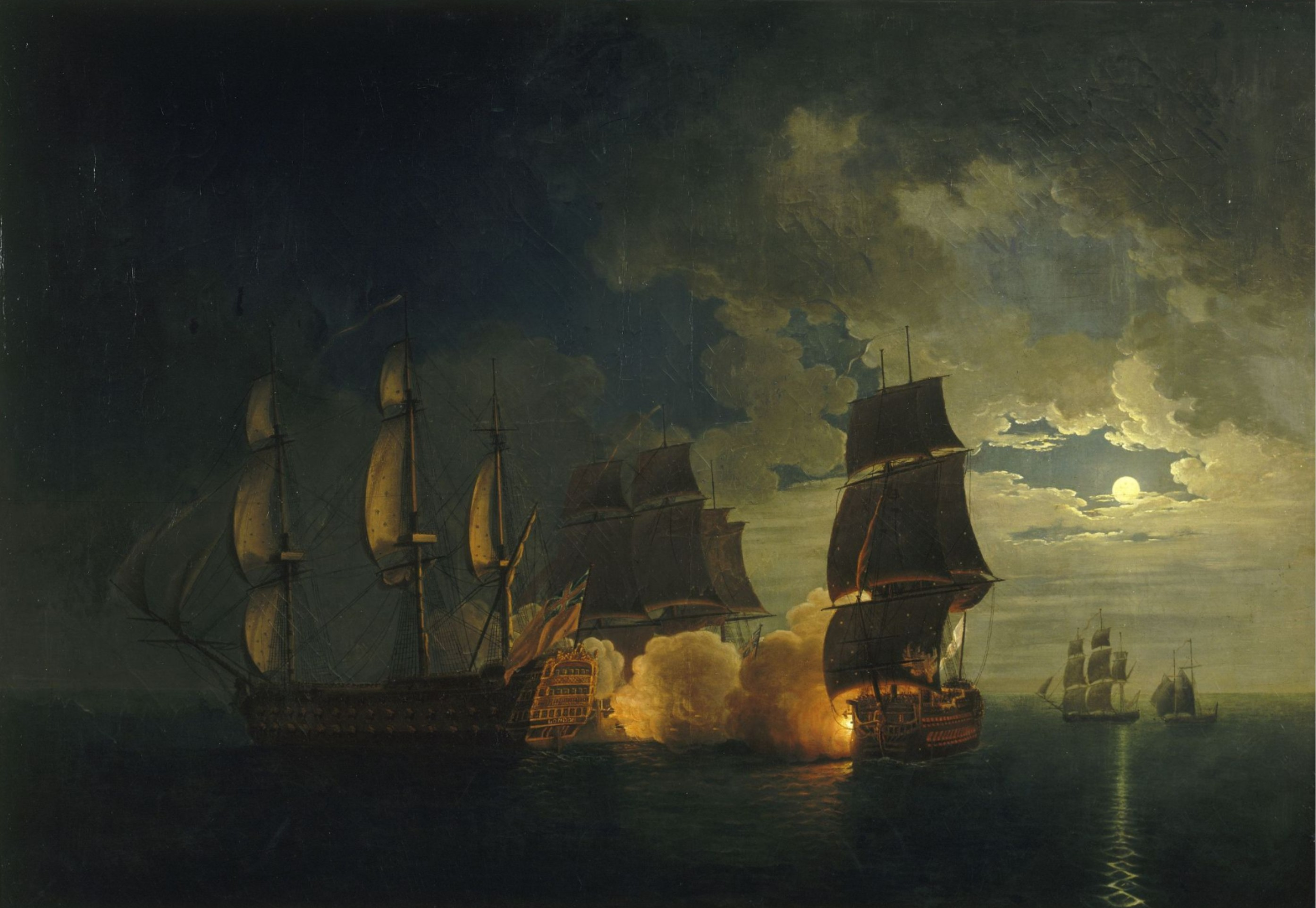
Action of 18 October 1782 between HMS London, Torbay (in the middle behind London), and the 74-gun Scipion

In 1759, under the command of Captain Augustus Keppel, the ship served in the Battle of Quiberon Bay.

== Fate ==
Her last action was as part of the blue squadron at the Battle of the Saintes under Captain Keppel.

Torbay was sold at Portsmouth to be taken to pieces on 17 August 1784.
