= Duke-class ship of the line =

Duke-class ships of the line

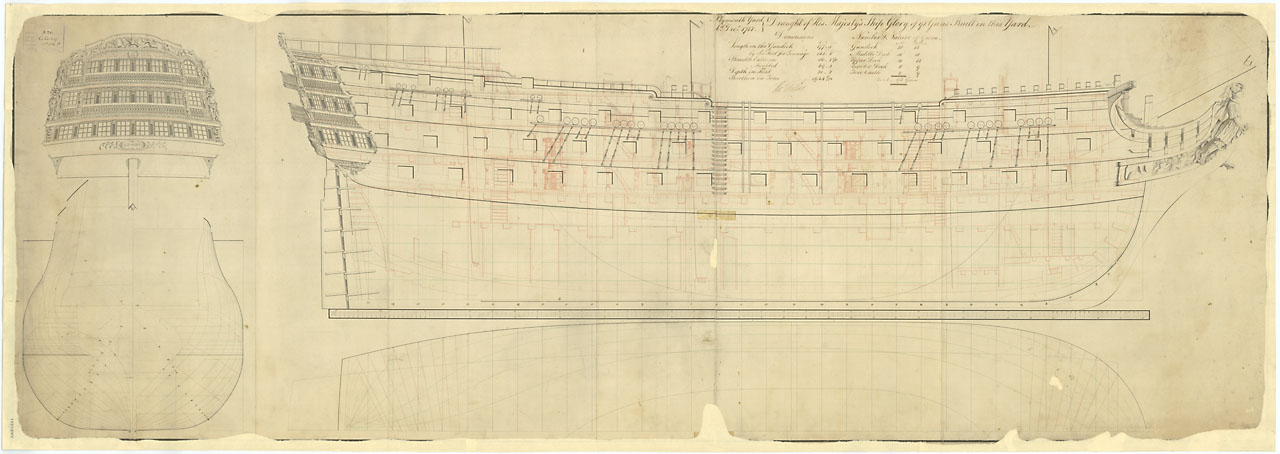
- Ship plan of HMS Glory

Class overview
- Name: Duke
- Operators: Royal Navy
- Preceded by: Barfleur class
- Succeeded by: Boyne class
- In service: 18 October 1777 – 1843
- Completed: 4
- Lost: 1

General characteristics
- Type: Ship of the line
- Length: 177 ft 6 in (54.10 m) (gundeck); 145 ft 3 in (44.27 m) (keel)
- Beam: 50 ft (15 m)
- Propulsion: Sails
- Armament: 98 guns: Gundeck: 28 × 32-pounders; Middle gundeck: 30 × 18-pounders; Upper gundeck: 30 × 12-pounders; Quarterdeck: 8 × 12-pounders; Forecastle: 2 × 12-pounders
- Notes: Ships in class include: Duke, Glory, St George, Atlas

The Duke-class ships of the line were a class of four 98-gun second rates, designed for the Royal Navy by Sir John Williams.

== Ships ==
- HMS Duke

Builder: Plymouth Dockyard
Ordered: 18 June 1771
Launched: 18 October 1777
Fate: Broken up, 1843

- HMS Glory

Builder: Plymouth Dockyard
Ordered: 16 July 1774
Launched: 5 July 1788
Fate: Broken up, 1825

- HMS St George

Builder: Portsmouth Dockyard
Ordered: 16 July 1774
Launched: 14 October 1785
Fate: Wrecked, 1811

- HMS Atlas

Builder: Chatham Dockyard
Ordered: 5 August 1777
Launched: 13 February 1782
Fate: Broken up, 1821
