= Action of 4 January 1781 =

Minor battle of the American War of Independence

- Part of the American Revolutionary War
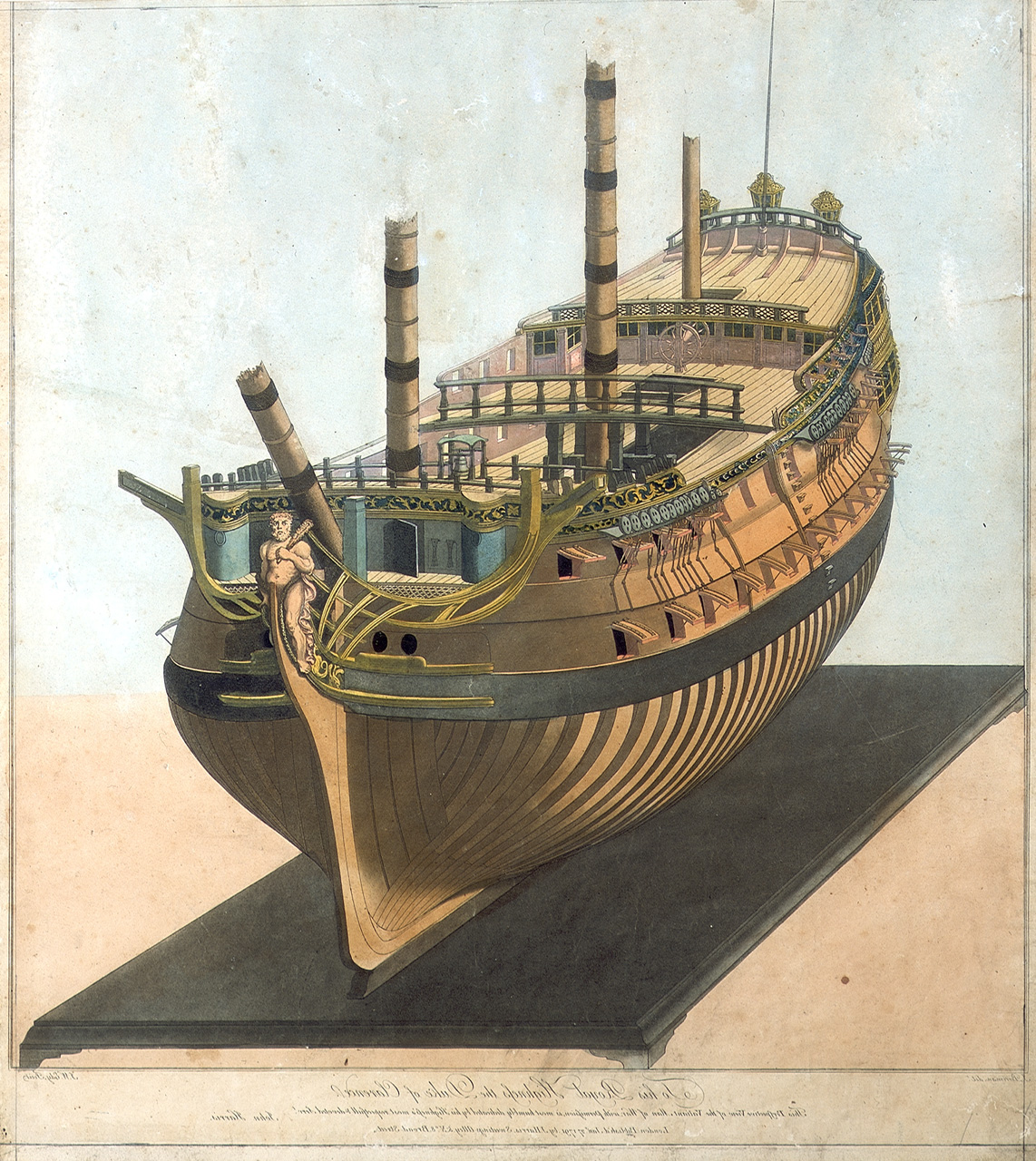
- Model of HMS Valiant
Date	4 January 1781
Location	Off Brest, Atlantic Ocean
Result	British victory

Belligerents
Great Britain	France

Commanders and leaders
Samuel Goodall; Lord Mulgrave	Louis-Marie Tanouarn; Nicolas de Grimouard

Strength
2 ships of the line	4 frigates

Casualties and losses
Unknown	1 frigate captured

The action of 4 January 1781 was a minor battle of the American Revolutionary War. A French frigate division, departing Brest, met two British 74-gun ships of the line. The frigates tried to flee their stronger opponents, which gave chase. One of the frigates sacrificed herself to allow the others to escape.

== Background ==
The War of American Independence had started in 1775, increasing tension between Britain and France. French support for the American insurgents finally triggered the Anglo-French War in 1778. French fleet sailed to America under Orvilliers and Estaing. In 1781, another expedition was preparing under Grasse. Frigates served as reconnaissance screens for the squadrons, but between major movements, they would often cruise independently to engage in commerce raiding.

== Battle ==
On 3 January 1781, a frigate division departed Brest to cruise at the entrance of the English Channel. It comprised the 32-gun frigates Fine under Louis-Marie de la Tanouarn and Minerve under Nicolas Henri de Grimouard, as well as the lighter 26-gun Diligente and Aigrette.

In the morning of 4, in heavy weather, the division detected the British 74-guns HMS Valiant under Captain Samuel Goodall and HMS Courageux under Captain Lord Mulgrave, and the frigate tried to escape. At 1330, Courageux caught up with Minerve and engaged. Grimouard was wounded in the battle, and Lieutenant Villeneuve took over. One hour later, Valiant also engaged Minerve, which then struck her colours. After Minerve surrendered, Valiant chased Fine, which successfully escaped.

== Aftermath ==
Courageux had sustained serious damage to her rigging, and had change her bowsprit, foremast and mizzen to repair.

Fine went on to serve in the Indian Ocean in the squadron under Suffren.
