= HMS Minerva (1759) =

32-gun Southampton-class warship of the Royal Navy

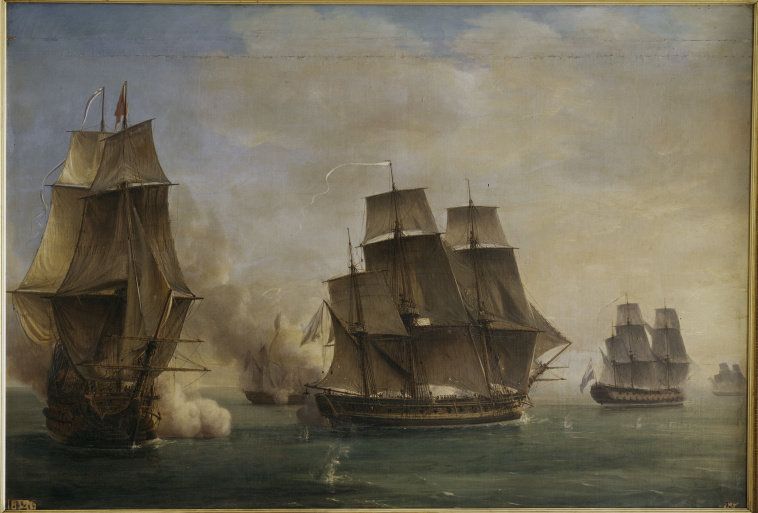
- Minerve on 7 February 1779

History

Great Britain
- Name: HMS Minerva
- Ordered: 25 May 1756
- Builder: John Quallet, Rotherhithe
- Laid down: 1 June 1756
- Launched: 17 January 1759
- Completed: 3 March 1759 at Deptford Dockyard
- Commissioned: January 1759
- Fate: Captured by France, 22 August 1778

France
- Name: Minerve
- Acquired: by capture, 22 August 1778
- Fate: Recaptured by Great Britain, 4 January 1781

Great Britain
- Name: HMS Recovery
- Commissioned: January 1781
- Decommissioned: 1783
- Fate: Sold to break up at Deptford, 30 December 1784

General characteristics
- Class & type: Southampton-class fifth-rate frigate
- Tons burthen: 664 24/94 bm
- Length: 124 ft 4 in (37.90 m) (gundeck); 102 ft 2.25 in (31.1468 m) (keel)
- Beam: 34 ft 11.5 in (10.655 m)
- Depth of hold: 12 ft 0 in (3.66 m)
- Sail plan: Full-rigged ship
- Complement: 210 officers and men
- Armament: 32 guns comprising: Upperdeck: 26 × 12-pounder guns; Quarterdeck: 4 × 6-pounder guns; Forecastle: 2 × 6-pounder guns

HMS Minerva was one of the four 32-gun Southampton-class fifth-rate frigates of the Royal Navy. She was launched in 1759 and served through the Seven Years' War, but was captured in 1778 during the American Revolutionary War and served as the French Minerve until being recaptured in 1781 and renamed HMS Recovery. She was broken up in 1784.

== Service history ==
=== British career ===
The frigate was built at Rotherhithe between 1756 and 1759 and was commissioned into the Royal Navy as HMS Minerva during the Seven Years' War. Under the command of Captain Alexander Hood, she took part in the Battle of Quiberon Bay on 20 November 1759. In mid-1761 prize money was paid to the crews of ships taking part in the battle, and also to the crews of Intrepid and Minerva, for the capture of St. Simon.

At daybreak on 24 January 1761 Minerva, still under the command of Captain Hood, encountered a large two-decker ship about 90 nautical miles (170 km; 100 mi) north-west of Cabo de Peñas in northern Spain. Minerva gave chase and finally caught her at 10.20 a.m. During a brisk engagement lasting no more than 40 minutes the enemy ship lost her main and fore top-mast, while soon after Minerva lost her bowsprit and fore-mast. Both ships were obliged to break off the action to clear the wreckage, but Minerva was ready to resume the fight first and closed with the enemy again at 4 p.m., forcing her to strike her colours after an hour. She proved to be the French ship Warwick (formerly HMS Warwick, captured in 1756), a 60-gun ship, but armed en flûte with only 34 guns, under the command M. le Vegerde Belair. She had sailed from Rochfort on 20 January, bound for the Isle de France (now Mauritius) loaded with provisions, ammunition, and stores, and also transporting a detachment of 74 soldiers and six other passengers. Warwick had 14 killed and 32 wounded, while aboard Minerve 14 were killed, and 34 wounded, three of whom later died.

On 15 February 1762 at the Downs, prize money was paid to the crews of Minerva and Edgar, for the capture of the French privateer Ecureuil and the recapture of the brig Elizabeth. Prize money for Warwick was paid from 19 July 1762 at Portsmouth.

During the American Revolutionary War Minerva was part of the West Indies Squadron under Admiral Peter Parker. On 14 August 1778 she captured the American 50-ton schooner Fanny off Hispaniola, sailing from Connecticut with a cargo of timber.

On 22 August 1778, Minerva, under the command of Captain John Stott, and unaware that France had declared war on Britain met the French 32-gun frigate Concorde, under Capitaine Le Gardeur de Tilly. Stott, mistaking her for a harmless merchantman, approached to speak to her, but Concorde fired two broadsides into her before Minerva could reply. The British were caught off guard, and suffered further misfortune when a powder explosion under the half-deck dismounted three guns, and killed or wounded eighteen men. Captain Stott was also severely wounded in the head and was carried below. After two and a half hours, Minerva surrendered, her mizzen-mast having gone overboard and her other masts tottering, her wheel destroyed, and having lost her Captain and First Lieutenant.

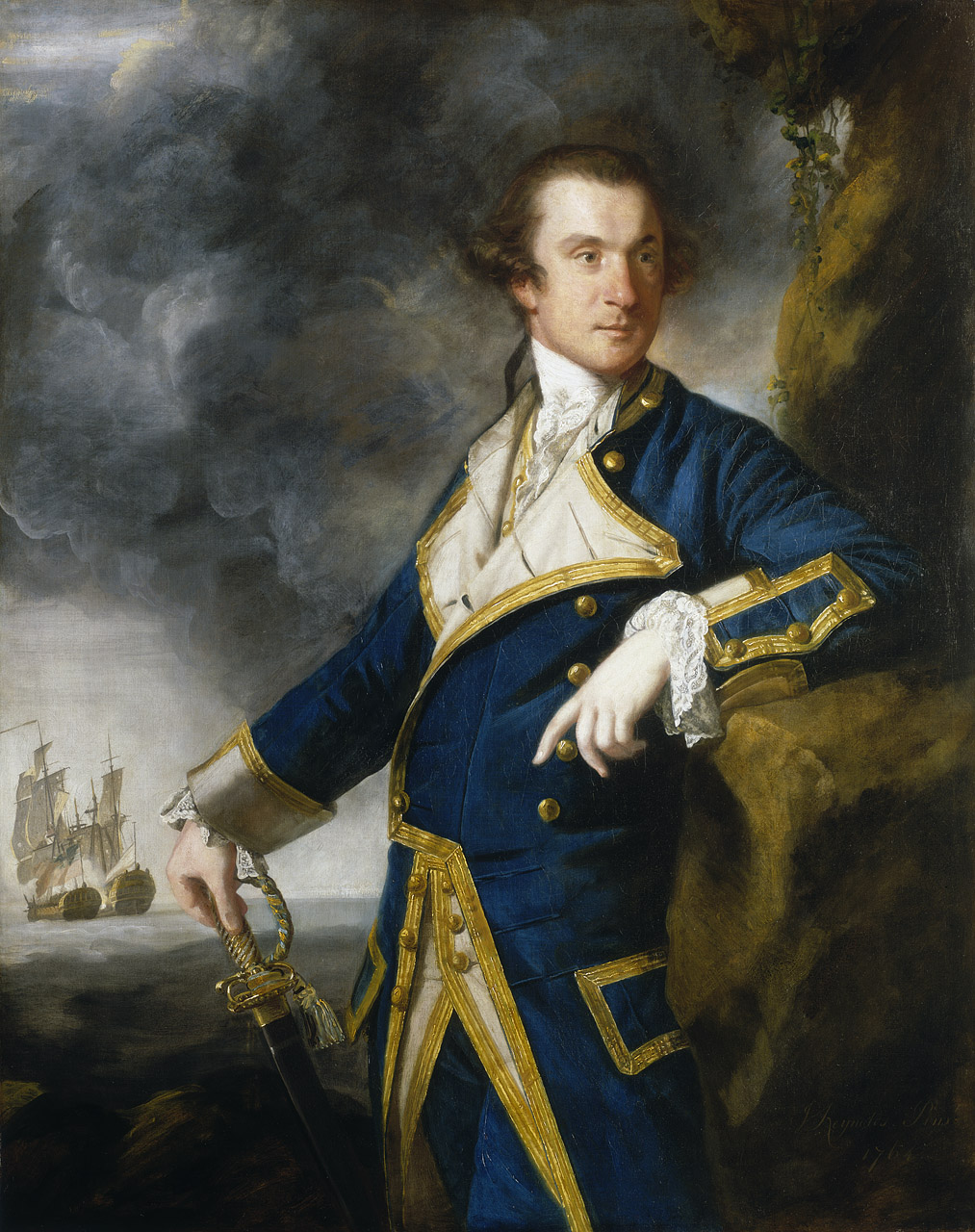
Portrait of Alexander Hood by Joshua Reynolds, 1763. The background features the scene where Hood recaptured Warwick

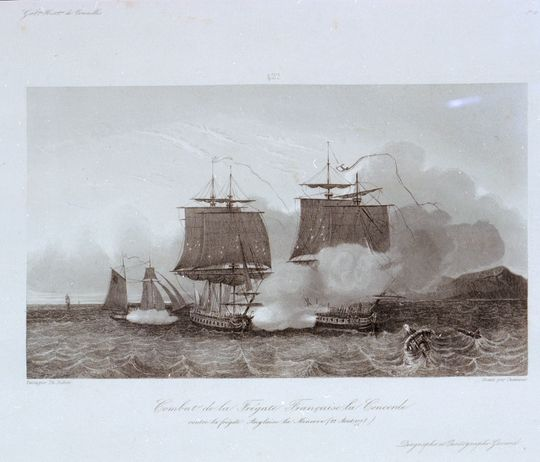
Battle between the french frigate Concorde and the English frigate Minerve 22 August 1778

=== French career ===
She was commissioned into the French Navy as Minerve, and commanded by Nicolas Henri de Grimouard. The 74-gun HMS Courageux and Valiant recaptured her in the action of 4 January 1781.

=== Second British career ===
The Royal Navy recommissioned her under the name HMS Recovery, as another HMS Minerva had been commissioned after she was lost. She was laid up in 1783 and sold the following year.
