= HMS Glory (1788) =

Duke-class ship of the line, 1788

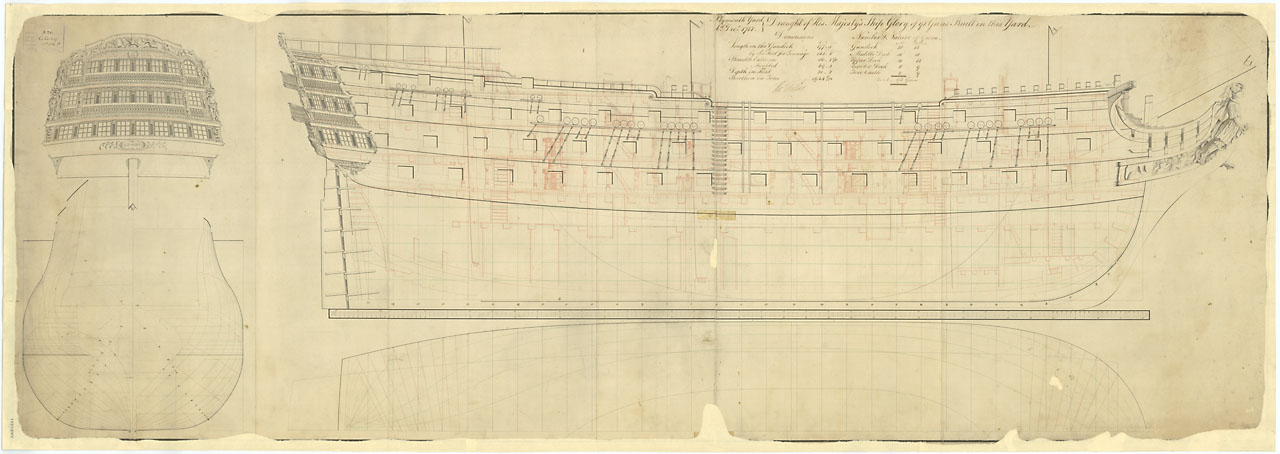
- Ship plan of Glory

History

Great Britain
- Name: HMS Glory
- Ordered: 16 July 1774
- Builder: Plymouth Dockyard
- Laid down: 7 April 1775
- Launched: 5 July 1788
- Honours and awards: Participated in: Battle of Cape Finisterre (1805)
- Fate: Broken up, 1825

General characteristics
- Class & type: Duke-class ship of the line
- Tons burthen: 194417/94 bm
- Length: Overall:177 ft 5 in (54.1 m); Keel:145 ft 5 in (44.3 m)
- Beam: 50 ft 1 3/8 in (15.3 m)
- Depth of hold: 21 ft 2 in (6.45 m)
- Propulsion: Sails
- Sail plan: Full-rigged ship
- Armament: Gundeck: 28 × 32-pounder guns; Middle gundeck: 30 × 18-pounder guns; Upper gundeck: 30 × 12-pounder guns; QD: 8 × 12-pounder guns; Fc: 2 × 12-pounder guns

HMS Glory was a 98-gun second-rate ship of the line of the Royal Navy, launched on 5 July 1788 at Plymouth.

== History ==
In 1798, some of her crew were court-martialed for mutiny.

On 11 March, 1805 Vice Admiral Sir John Orde, 1st Baronet aboard "Glory", off Cadiz, notified the U.S. Consul at Cadiz that Cadiz was under blockade.

Glory served as the flagship of Rear-Admiral Sir Charles Stirling at the Battle of Cape Finisterre in 1805, commanded by Captain Samuel Warren.

Glory was re-rated as a prison ship at Chatham on 27 September 1809. Lieutenant Richard Simmonds commanded her in 1810 and 1811. (Note: In 1812 Simmonds assumed command of the gunbrig HMS Attack.) His replacement was Lieutenant Robert Tyte and Vice Admiral George Murray in 1794.

=== Fate ===
Glory was paid off into ordinary in August 1814. In 1815 the navy used her as a powder hulk. She was ordered to be broken up in 1819; break up was completed at Chatham on 30 July 1825.
