= Barfleur-class ship of the line =

Class of Royal Navy sail-powered warships

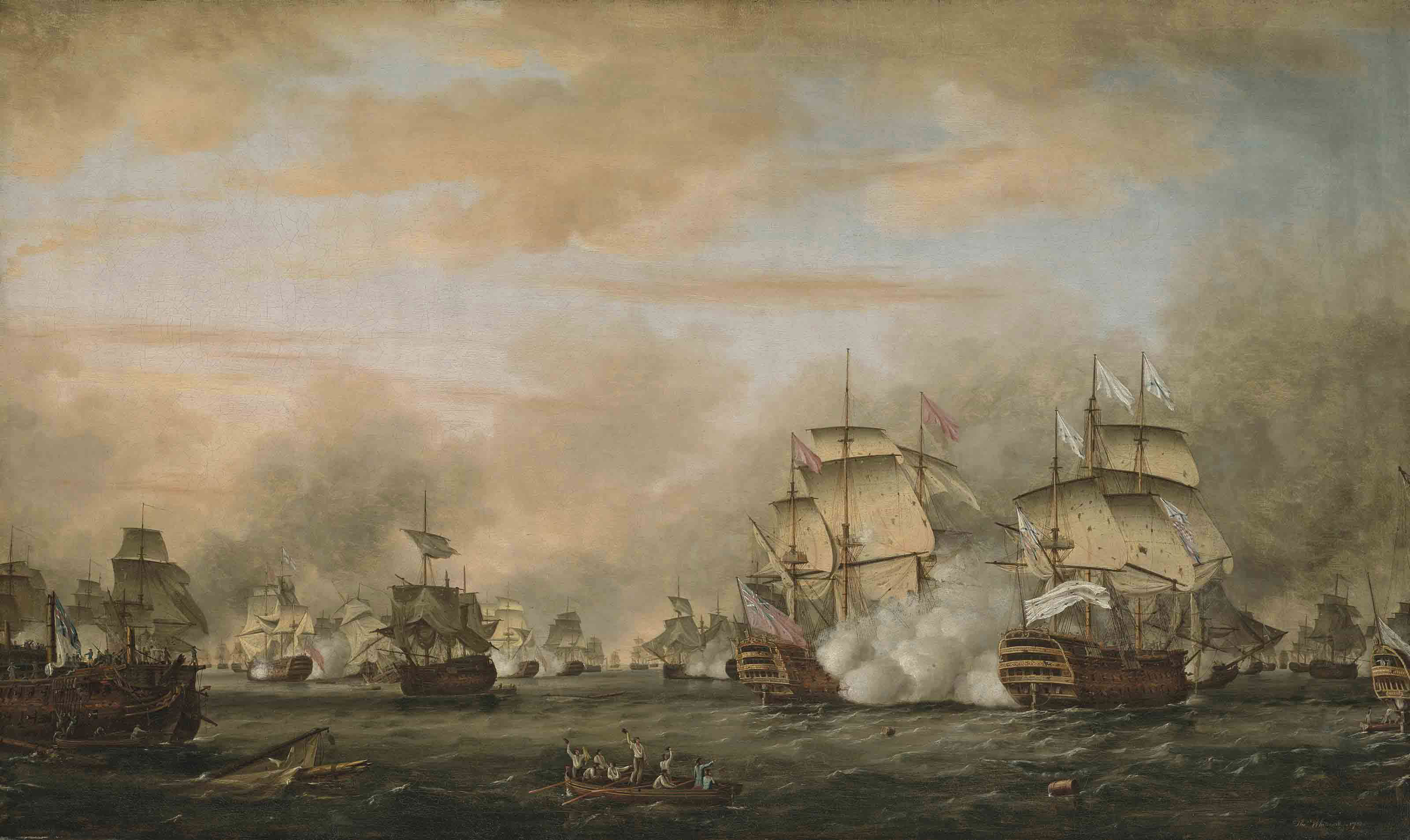
- The Battle of the Saintes, 12 April 1782: surrender of the Ville de Paris by Thomas Whitcombe, painted 1783, shows Hood's Barfleur, centre, attacking the French flagship Ville de Paris, right, at the Battle of the Saintes.

Class overview
- Name: Barfleur
- Operators: Royal Navy
- Preceded by: London class
- Succeeded by: Duke class
- In service: 30 July 1768 – 1839
- Completed: 4

General characteristics
- Type: Ship of the line
- Length: 177 ft 6 in (54.10 m) (gundeck); 144 ft 0.75 in (43.9103 m) (keel)
- Beam: 50 ft 3 in (15.32 m)
- Propulsion: Sails
- Armament: 90 guns: Gundeck: 28 × 32-pounders; Middle gundeck: 30 × 18-pounders; Upper gundeck: 30 × 12-pounders; Forecastle: 2 × 9-pounders
- Notes: Ships in class include: Barfleur, Prince George, Princess Royal, Formidable

The Barfleur-class ships of the line were a class of four 90-gun second rates, designed for the Royal Navy by Sir Thomas Slade.

== Design ==
The design for the Barfleur class was based upon HMS Royal William.

== Ships ==
- HMS Barfleur

Builder: Chatham Dockyard
Ordered: 1 March 1762
Launched: 30 July 1768
Fate: Broken up, 1819

- HMS Prince George

Builder: Chatham Dockyard
Ordered: 11 June 1766
Launched: 31 August 1772
Fate: Broken up, 1839

- HMS Princess Royal

Builder: Portsmouth Dockyard
Ordered: 10 September 1767
Launched: 18 October 1773
Fate: Broken up, 1807

- HMS Formidable

Builder: Chatham Dockyard
Ordered: 17 August 1768
Launched: 20 August 1777
Fate: Broken up, 1813
