= HMS London (1766) =

Ship of the line of the Royal Navy

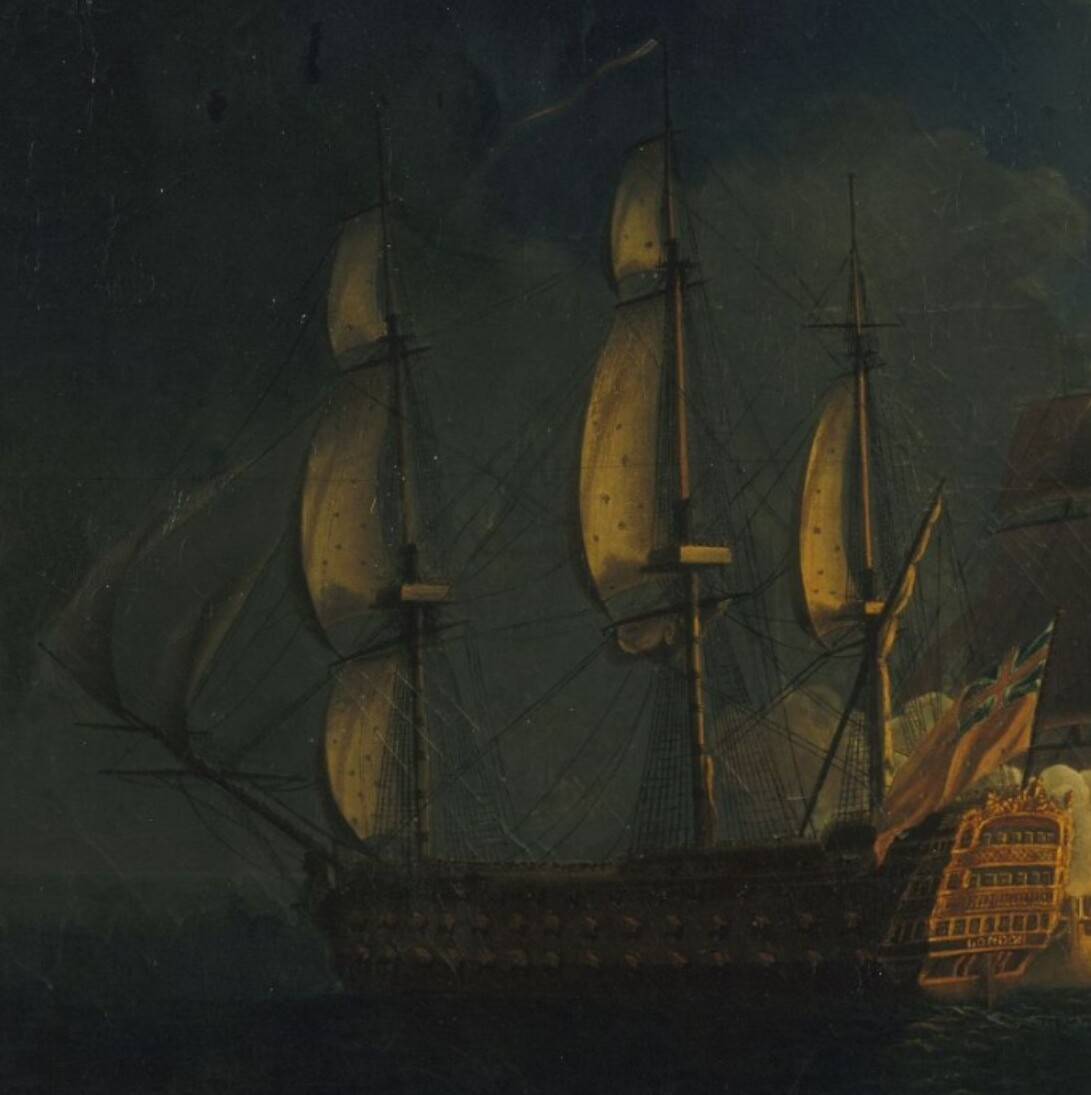
- London at the action of 18 October 1782

History

Great Britain
- Name: HMS London
- Ordered: 28 September 1759
- Builder: Chatham Dockyard
- Launched: 24 May 1766
- Fate: Broken up, 1811
- Notes: Participated in: Battle of the Chesapeake; Battle of Groix; Battle of Copenhagen

General characteristics
- Class & type: London-class ship of the line
- Tons burthen: 1894 (bm)
- Length: 177 ft 6 in (54.10 m) (gundeck)
- Beam: 49 ft (15 m)
- Depth of hold: 21 ft (6.4 m)
- Sail plan: Full-rigged ship
- Armament: 90 guns; Gundeck: 28 × 32-pounder guns; Middle gundeck: 30 × 18-pounder guns; Upper gundeck: 30 × 12-pounder guns; Fc: 2 × 9-pounder guns; 98 guns: Gundeck: 28 × 32-pounder guns; Middle gundeck: 30 × 18-pounder guns; Upper gundeck: 30 × 12-pounder guns; QD: 8 × 12-pounder guns; FC: 2 × 12-pounder guns

HMS London was a 90-gun second-rate ship of the line of the Royal Navy, launched on 24 May 1766 at Chatham Dockyard. London was originally launched as a 90-gun ship, as was standard for second rates at the time, but was later increased to 98 guns when she had eight 12-pounders installed on her quarterdeck. She was Sir Thomas Graves' flagship at the Battle of the Chesapeake in 1781. In the action of 18 October 1782, she was raked by Scipion and had to let her escape.

== French Revolutionary Wars ==
She participated in the Battle of Groix in 1795.

On 19 December 1795, she ran aground on the Owers Sandbank, in the English Channel off the coast of Sussex. She was refloated and taken in t Portsmouth, Hampshire. Next, London participated in an abortive invasion of Ferrol. On 29 August 1800, in Vigo Bay, Admiral Sir Samuel Hood assembled a cutting-out party from the vessels under his command consisting of two boats each from Amethyst, Stag, Amelia, Brilliant and Cynthia, four boats from Courageaux, as well as the boats from Renown, London and Impetueux. The party went in and after a 15-minute fight captured the French privateer Guêpe, of Bordeaux and towed her out. She was of 300 tons burthen and had a flush deck. Pierced for 20 guns, she carried eighteen 9-pounders, and she and her crew of 161 men were under the command of Citizen Dupan. In the attack she lost 25 men killed, including Dupan, and 40 wounded. British casualties amounted to four killed, 23 wounded and one missing. (Note: A first-class share of the prize money was worth £42 19s 6½d; a fifth-class share, that of a seaman, was worth 1s 9½d.) In 1847 the Admiralty awarded the Naval General Service Medal with clasp "29 Aug. Boat Service 1800" to all surviving claimants from the action.

She was present at the Battle of Copenhagen in 1801, as part of Sir Hyde Parker's reserve fleet.

== Napoleonic Wars ==
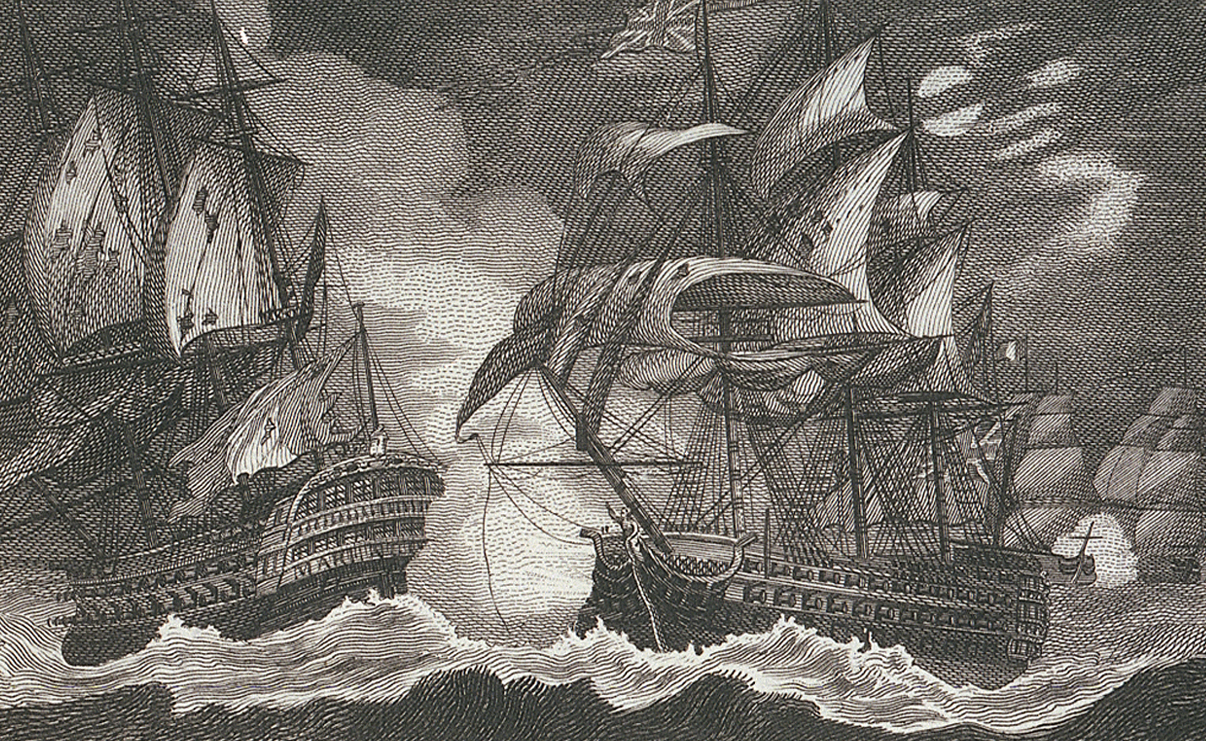
The capture of Marengo by London on 13 March 1806

At the action of 13 March 1806, London captured the French ship of the line Marengo. In 1807, she helped escort the Portuguese royal family in its flight from Portugal to Brazil.

== Fate ==
London was broken up in 1811.
