= French ship Courageux (1753) =

French 74-gun ship of the line

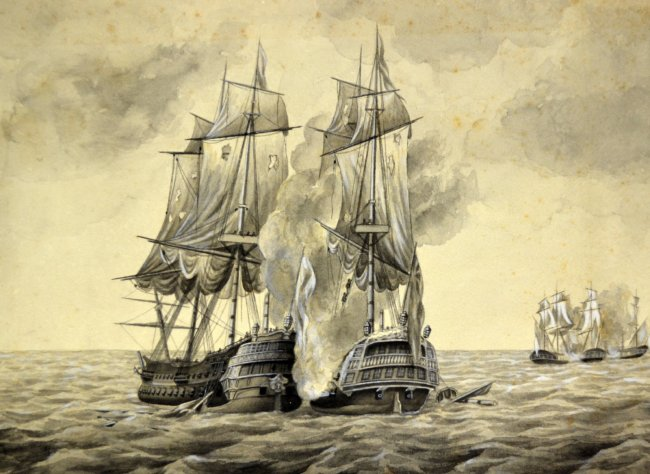
- Courageux (left) at the Battle of Cape Finisterre in 1761

History

France
- Name: Courageux
- Builder: Brest
- Launched: 11 October 1753
- Captured: 13 August 1761, by Royal Navy

Great Britain
- Name: Courageux
- Acquired: 13 August 1761
- Fate: Wrecked off Gibraltar, 18 December 1796

General characteristics
- Class & type: 74-gun third-rate ship of the line
- Displacement: 2800 tonneaux
- Tons burthen: 1500 port tonneaux
- Length: 172 feet 3 inches (52.5 m) (gundeck)
- Beam: 48 ft 3/4 in (14.6 m)
- Depth of hold: 20 ft 10 1/2 in (6.4 m)
- Sail plan: Full-rigged ship
- Armament: French Navy: 74 guns; Gundeck: 28 × 36-pounders; Upper gundeck: 30 × 18-pounders; Quarterdeck: 16 × 8-pounders; Royal Navy: 74 guns; Gundeck: 28 × 32-pounders; Upper gundeck: 28 × 18-pounders; Quarterdeck: 18 × 9-pounders

Courageux was a 74-gun ship of the line of the French Navy, launched in 1753. She was captured by the Royal Navy in 1761 and taken into service as HMS Courageux. In 1778 she joined the Channel Fleet, and she was later part of the squadron commanded by Commodore Charles Fielding that controversially captured a Dutch convoy on 31 December 1779, in what became known as the Affair of Fielding and Bylandt. On 4 January 1781, Courageux recaptured Minerva in a close-range action west of Ushant that lasted more than an hour. That April, Courageux joined the convoy under George Darby which successfully relieved the Great Siege of Gibraltar.

At the start of the French Revolutionary Wars, Courageux took part in the blockade and subsequent occupation of Toulon in 1793. That September, she was sent with a squadron under Robert Linzee to support an insurrection in Corsica and took part in an unsuccessful attack on San Fiorenzo. When Toulon was evacuated, Courageux was in a state of disrepair and was forced to warp out of her mooring without a rudder, but was able to complete repairs while rescuing allied troops from the waterfront. At the Battle of Genoa in March 1795, she was instrumental in the capture of the French ships Ça Ira and Censeur, but at the subsequent Battle of the Hyères Islands, she was so slow getting into the action that, by the time she arrived, the order had been given to disengage.

In December 1796, Courageux was with the Mediterranean Fleet, anchored in the bay of Gibraltar, when a great storm tore her from her mooring and drove her onto the rocks of the Barbary coast. Of the 593 officers and men who were on board, only 129 escaped: five by means of a launch, and the rest by clambering along the fallen mainmast to the shore.

== Design ==
Plans of the Courageux, 1761

Another view of the Courageux, 1761

Courageux was a 74-gun ship of the line of the French Royal Navy. Her keel of 140 feet 1 1/8 inches (42.7 m) was laid down at Brest in April 1751, and her dimensions as built were 172 feet 3 inches (52.5 m) along the gun deck, with a beam of 48 feet 3/4 inch (14.6 m) and a depth in the hold of 20 feet 10 1/2 inches (6.4 m). At 1,721 30/94 tons burthen, her size was typical for French 74s, which were at least 100 tons larger than their British equivalents. When fully manned, she would have carried a complement of 650 men.

While in French service, Courageux carried thirty 36-pounder (16 kg) guns on her lower deck and an equal number of 18-pounder (8.2 kg) guns on her upper deck. Her upper works were furnished with sixteen 8-pounder (3.6 kg) guns. Following her capture, her main guns were reduced both in weight and number. Her lower deck was re-equipped with twenty-eight 32 pounders (15 kg), while the number of 18-pound guns on her upper deck was also reduced to twenty-eight. The armament on her upper works was increased to eighteen 9-pounder (4.1 kg) guns, fourteen on the quarterdeck and four on the forecastle.

With the end of the Seven Years' War came spending cuts which led not only to a drop in the number of Royal Navy ships being ordered, but also the Admiralty favouring existing designs over new. By 1783 the industry was booming once more, and a proposal for the new Carnatic class was approved. The four ships of this series were built to the exact lines of Courageux, and as such were noticeably larger than the other British 74s then in production.

== Service ==
=== Capture ===
In the late evening of 13 August 1761, Courageux was off Vigo in the company of the frigates Malicieuse and Hermione, when the 74-gun British ship HMS Bellona and the frigate Brilliant were seen. Mistaking them for ships of the line, Courageux and her compatriots sought escape into the darkness. The moon was bright, however, and the British were able to pursue.

The next morning, Courageux's captain decided that Bellona was a 50-gun ship and, believing he had the superior force, ordered the frigates to attack Brilliant while he turned to close with Bellona. When the ships were within musket-shot, Courageux opened fire and, within nine minutes, had brought down Bellona's mizzen-mast and cut her rigging so badly that the ship became difficult to handle. Bellona's captain, seeing the danger, ordered a boarding party, but Courageux sheered off. With difficulty, the British ship was able to wear and, coming up on Courageux's starboard quarter, unleashed a series of devastating broadsides. Courageux was greatly damaged and, with about 200 men killed and a further 100 wounded, struck her colours. The two French frigates withdrew.

Courageux was purchased by the Admiralty on 2 February the following year, for £9,797.16.4d, and taken into the Royal Navy as the third-rate HMS Courageux. Another £22,380.11.4d was invested in July, when a large repair was begun at Portsmouth, which took until the middle of June 1764 to complete. A further substantial repair was made between January 1772 and July 1773, the price for which was £16,420.19.10d. In July 1776, Courageux was commissioned under Captain Samuel Hood, and, in November, £10,132.6.2d was spent having her fitted out as a guardship at Portsmouth.

=== The Channel Fleet ===
Courageux was part of Admiral Augustus Keppel's Channel Fleet in 1778 and shared in the capture of the 32-gun French frigate Licorne and the French lugger Coureur on 17 June. The following day, Courageux was despatched with HMS Foudroyant and HMS Robust in pursuit of another French vessel. Other British ships soon joined the chase, which was concluded on 19 June when the prize, the 32-gun Pallas, was brought to. Courageux received a share of the prize money for three more captures in September and five more in October. Between April and May 1779, she underwent another refit, which included the sheathing of her hull with copper, at a cost of £7,468.7.0d. She then returned to the Channel Fleet, by then under the command of Sir Charles Hardy. Hardy's fleet continued to take prizes in the Channel, and Courageux shared in the rewards: in June, HMS Southampton took the Spanish ship Purísima Concepción, Ambuscade recaptured the 14-gun HMS Helena, and an American schooner, Marmy was taken by HMS Milford.

On 31 December 1779, Courageux was part of the squadron commanded by Commodore Charles Fielding that captured a Dutch convoy, prior to a declaration of war. In what later became known as the Affair of Fielding and Bylandt, the British stopped the convoy in the Channel for the purpose of searching for contraband. The request was refused, and an action began which ended with the Dutch surrendering after a token resistance. The British took the captured ships as prizes, and Courageux received her share.

Courageux was in the Western Approaches on 12 March 1780, in the company of another seventy-four, HMS Alexander, when a large frigate was seen to the south-east. Alexander set off in pursuit and after eighteen hours was close enough to engage with her chase guns. After two hours more, as she was overhauling her quarry, Alexander's fore-top mast snapped. Courageux had by this time caught up and continued the chase, eventually forcing the French frigate's surrender. The prize was the Monsieur, a privateer from Granville of 40 guns and a crew of 362.

In 1781, Courageux was under the command of Lord Mulgrave, and in the action of 4 January 1781, she and HMS Valiant recaptured Minerva, approximately 5 miles west of Ushant. Minerve had sailed in company from Brest the previous day for a fortnight's cruise around the Scilly Isles. Courageux exchanged fire at close range for more than an hour, during which time all of Minerve's masts were put out of action and extensive damage done to her hull, while fifty of her crew were killed and a further twenty-three injured. Courageux's mizzen, foremast and bowsprit were damaged, and ten of her crew were killed and seven wounded. Valiant, in the meantime, had gone off in pursuit of another ship. Courageux towed her prize to Spithead, arriving on the morning of 8 January.

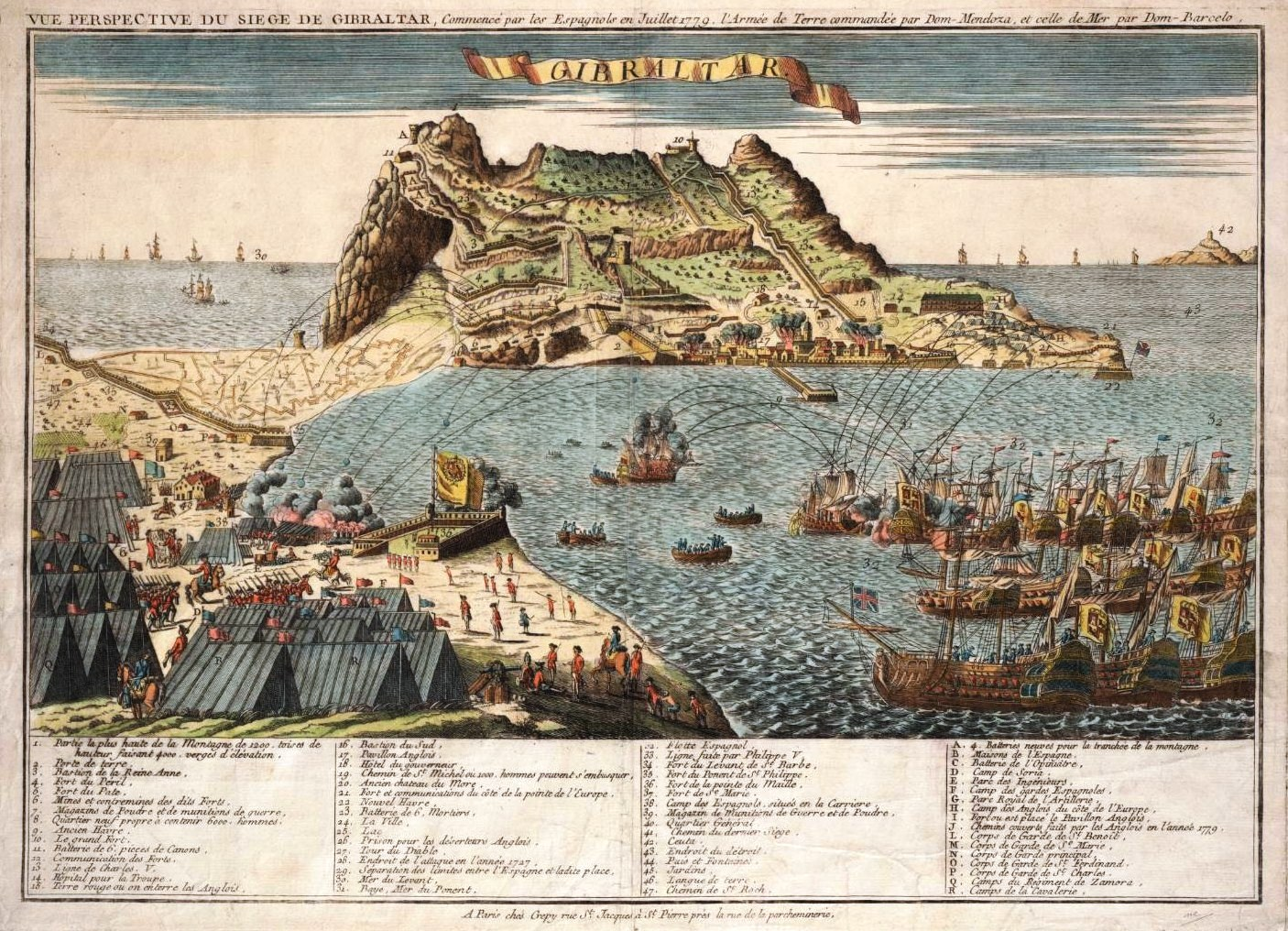
A 1779 depiction of British-controlled Gibraltar, under siege from Franco-Spanish forces.

In April, Courageux was part of the convoy under George Darby sent to relieve the Great Siege of Gibraltar, maintained by French and Spanish forces since June 1779. Courageux shared in the prize money for the French brigs Duc de Chartres and Trois Amis and the Spanish frigate Santa Leucadia captured during the cruise.

An £8,547.17.7d refit was carried out in April 1782. Then, in June 1787 a greater repair was required, costing £30,369.13.4d and taking until July 1789. Following a dispute with Spain over territorial rights along the Nootka Sound, Courageux was commissioned in April 1790 under George Countess for the Spanish Armament. The crisis was largely resolved through a series of agreements signed between October 1790 and January 1794. In February 1791, Alan Gardner was in command when Courageux was recommissioned for the Russian Armament. Again, the matter was settled before she was called into action, and she paid off in September of that year.

=== Toulon and Corsica ===
France declared war on Britain and the Dutch Republic in February 1793, and Courageux, under William Waldegrave, was sent with other British ships to blockade the French fleet in Toulon. By the middle of August, this British force, under Hood in the 100-gun HMS Victory, had grown to twenty-one ships of the line. On 23 August, a deputation of French royalists came aboard Victory to discuss the conditional surrender of the town, and on 27 August 1500 troops were landed to remove the republicans occupying the forts guarding the port. The landings were covered by Courageux, Meleager, Tartar, Egmont and Robust. Once the forts were secure, the remainder of Hood's fleet, accompanied by seventeen Spanish ships of the line which had just arrived, sailed into the harbour.

In September 1793, during the occupation, Courageux joined a squadron under Robert Linzee, which was sent to Corsica to support an insurrection there. General Pasquale Paoli, the leader of the insurgent party, had assured Hood that a small show of strength was all that was needed to force the island's surrender. This turned out not to be the case, however, and Linzee's appeals to the French garrisons there were rejected. His force, of three ships of the line and two frigates, was too small to blockade the island, so an attack on San Fiorenzo was decided upon.

The two frigates, Lowestoffe and Nemesis, were charged with destroying a Martello tower at Forneilli, two miles from the town, which guarded the only secure anchorage in the bay. After taking a few salvos from the ships, the French garrison deserted, and the British landed men to secure the fort. Linzee's squadron entered the bay but was prevented from engaging the batteries of San Fiorenzo by contrary winds. During the night, HMS Ardent was warped into a position where, at 03:30 on 1 October, she was able to attack the batteries and cover the approach of the other British ships. Half an hour later, HMS Alcide tried to take up a station nearby but was blown towards some rocks by a sudden change of wind and had to be towed clear. Courageux in the meantime covered Alcide's stern by coming between it and the gunfire from a redoubt on the shore. Alcide eventually got into a position where she could join in the action, and the three ships bombarded the redoubt until 08:15 when, there being little sign of damage, Linzee gave the order to withdraw. Courageux bore the brunt of the action, having been exposed to a raking fire from the town, and caught on fire four times after being hit by heated shot.

During the same month, French troops laid siege to the city of Toulon, and in December, the allied force within was driven out. When the order to withdraw was given, Courageux was being repaired and was without a rudder, but she was able to warp out of the harbour and assist in the evacuation of allied troops from the waterfront. A replacement rudder was brought out, suspended between two ship's boats, and fitted later.

=== Battle of Genoa ===
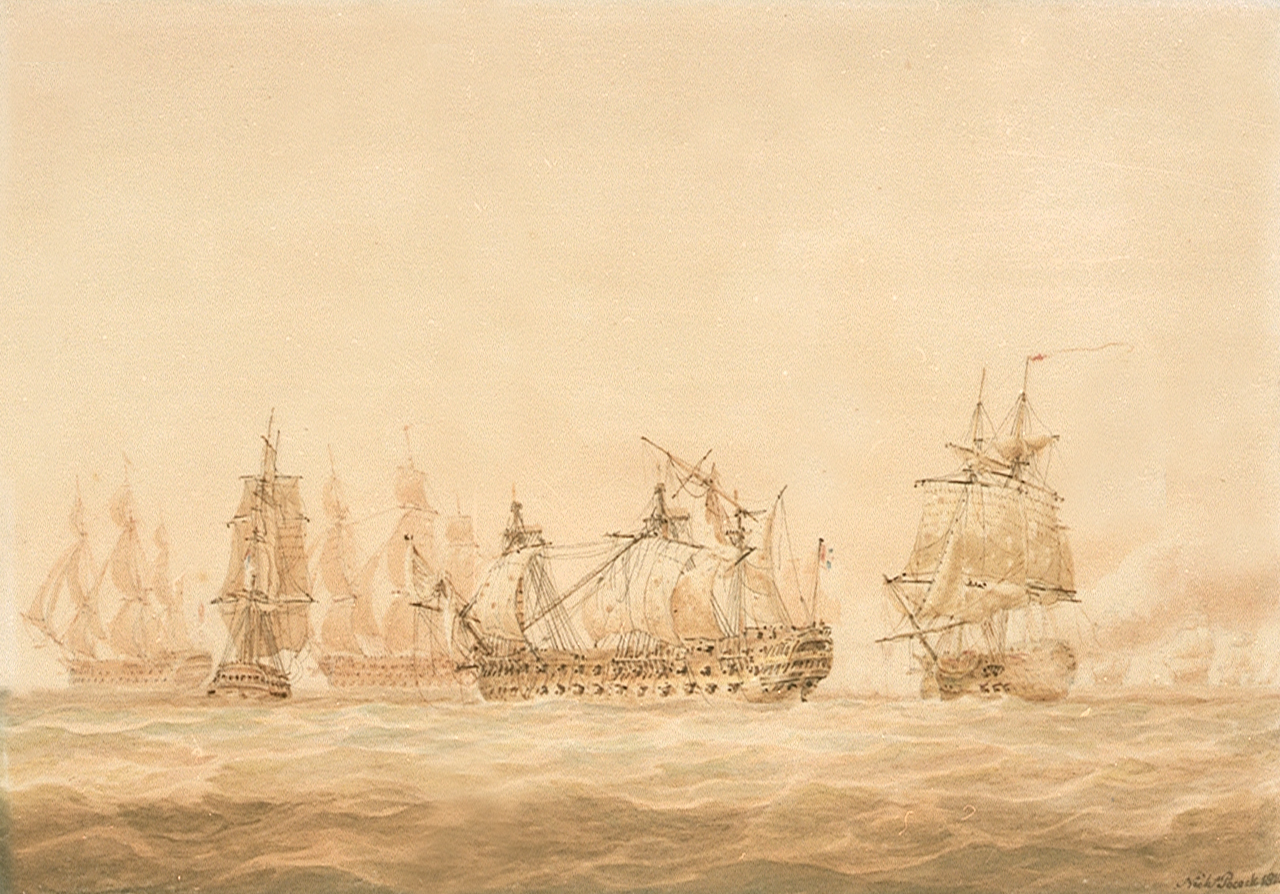
Nicholas Pocock's portrayal of the attack on Ça Ira by HMS Agamemnon. In fact, the French ship was under tow at this point, and Agamemnon was firing from a distance.

Courageux was one of thirteen ships of the line, which, together with seven frigates, two sloops and a cutter, were anchored in the roads of Livorno on 8 March 1795. The following day, a British scout, the 24-gun sloop Moselle, brought news that a French fleet of fifteen ships of the line, six frigates and two brigs, had been seen off the islands of Sainte-Marguerite. Vice-Admiral William Hotham immediately set off in pursuit, and on 10 March the advanced British frigates spotted the French fleet at some distance, making its way back to Toulon against the wind. Two days later, on the night of 12 March, a storm developed which badly damaged two French ships of the line. These ships were escorted to Gourjean Bay by two French frigates, leaving the opposing fleets roughly equal in strength and number.

The next morning, Hotham attempted to get his ships into a form line but, seeing no response from the French fleet, changed his orders to general chase. At 08:00 the 80-gun Ça Ira at the rear collided with Victoire, and her fore and main topmasts collapsed overboard. The leading British ship was the 36-gun frigate HMS Inconstant under Captain Thomas Fremantle, which reached the damaged Ça Ira within an hour of the collision and opened fire at close range, causing further destruction. Seeing the danger, the French frigate Vestale fired upon Inconstant from a distance before taking the limping Ça Ira in tow. Shortly after, HMS Agamemnon under Captain Horatio Nelson joined the action, until several of the French ships bearing down forced her to drop back into her station in the line.

Throughout the day and the following night, the British van sporadically engaged the French rearguard, with Ça Ira dropping further behind the main body of the French force. In order to better protect the damaged ship, the French admiral, Pierre Martin, ordered the ship of the line Censeur to replace Vestale as the towing ship. By morning the fleets were 21 nautical miles (39 km) south-west of Genoa, with the British rapidly gaining ground. Ça Ira and Censeur had fallen further behind, and Hotham sent his two fastest ships after them. Captain and Bedford did not arrive simultaneously and both were repulsed, although further damage was inflicted on the French stragglers in the process. Martin ordered his line to wear in succession and get between the British fleet and the badly damaged Ça Ira and Censeur, which in the meantime had come under a new threat from the recently arrived Courageux and HMS Illustrious. A sudden drop in wind made manoeuvres difficult, and the leading French ship, Duquesne under Captain Zacharie Allemand, found itself sailing down the opposite side of the British vanguard.

At 08:00, Duquesne was in a position to engage Illustrious and Courageux, which, in their efforts to reach Ça Ira and Censeur, were now far ahead and to leeward of their line. Two other French ships, Victoire and Tonnant, joined the action, and, for an hour, the French and British vanguards exchanged heavy fire. Both British ships were badly mauled: Illustrious had drifted out of the battle, having lost her main and mizzen masts over the side, while Courageux also had two masts down and her hull much holed by French shot. The Duquesne, Victoire, and Tonnant then exchanged passing shots with the British ships coming up, before turning away and leaving Ça Ira and Censeur to their fate. Hotham, considering the condition of his van ships, and content with his prizes, did not pursue.

=== Action off Hyeres ===
The fleet was re-victualling in San Fiorenzo bay on 8 July 1795, when a small squadron under Commodore Horatio Nelson approached, pursued by the French Fleet from Toulon. The British fleet was not able to put to sea immediately, due to contrary winds, but was spotted by the French, who abandoned their chase. Hotham finished refitting and supplying his ships, and finally managed to set off after his quarry at 21:00, almost twelve hours later. On the night of 12 July, the British ships were hit by a storm, and they were still carrying out repairs the following morning when the French fleet was sighted again. At 03:45 Hotham gave the order to make all possible sail in pursuit of their enemy, which by then was 5 nautical miles (9.3 km) away, bearing towards Fréjus.

By 08:00, the French had formed a tight line of battle, but the British ships were strung out over an 8 nmi (15 km) distance. The leading British ships, Victory, Culloden, and Cumberland, at 3/4 nmi (1.4 km), were within range and opened fire. After six hours, as more ships were arriving, one of the rearmost French ships, Alcide struck. Before the British could take possession of her she caught fire and exploded. Courageux, under the command of Benjamin Hallowell, and some way back, was unable to get into the action before Hotham, believing the fleet to be running out of sea room, signalled to disengage.

== Fate ==
In December 1796, Courageux was with St Vincent's fleet, anchored in the bay of Gibraltar, when a great storm tore her from her mooring and drove her onto the rocks. Sources differ as to which day this occurred and the number of lives lost. William James records that on 10 December a French squadron under Admiral Villeneuve left the Mediterranean, but the British were unable to pursue due to a strong lee-shore wind. The weather took a turn for the worse, and that night several ships cut or had their cables snapped, including HMS Culloden and HMS Gibraltar.

When Courageux parted from her anchor, Captain Benjamin Hallowell was ashore at Gibraltar, serving on a court martial, and Lieutenant John Burrows was in command. The ship drifted across the bay and almost under the guns of the Spanish batteries, after which she was blown towards the Barbary coast under close-reefed topsails; Burrows was reluctant to run through the Straits for fear of meeting with Villeneuve's ships. Towards evening, the wind and rain increased to hurricane force, and soon after 20:00, the crew, who had been exhausted from trying to sail the ship out of trouble, were sent to dinner; the officers also retired below, except for a lieutenant of the watch. At 21:00, when land was sighted, there were too few men available to prevent the Courageux hitting the rocks at the foot of Mons Abyla on the African coast. She broadsided, losing her masts over the side, and water entered rapidly as waves and winds battered her. Of the 593 officers and men who were on board, only 129 escaped: five by means of the ship's launch, and the remainder by moving along the fallen mainmast to the shore.

Lloyd's List stated that she had been lost in a gale on 12 December that also resulted in several transport vessels and merchant ships being driven on shore, with the Spaniards capturing the transports. Lloyd's List reported that only five people had been saved from Courageux. In the first printings of his book, The Naval History of Great Britain, Volume I, (1793–1796), James gave the date of the wrecking as 17 December, but this is changed to the 10th from the second edition on. David Hepper says it occurred on the 18th, as does David Steel in Steel's Naval Remembrancer: From the Commencement of the War in 1793 to the End of the Year 1800. John Marshall in his Royal Naval Biography (Volume I, Part II) says the wreck took place on the 19th.
