= HMS Duke (1777) =

Ship of the line of the Royal Navy

- Duke

History

Great Britain
- Name: HMS Duke
- Ordered: 18 June 1771
- Builder: Plymouth Dockyard
- Laid down: October 1772
- Launched: 18 October 1777
- Fate: Broken up, 1843

General characteristics
- Class & type: Duke-class ship of the line
- Tons burthen: 194328/94 (bm)
- Length: 177 ft 6 in (54.10 m) (gundeck)
- Beam: 50 ft (15 m)
- Depth of hold: 21 ft 2 in (6.45 m)
- Propulsion: Sails
- Sail plan: Full-rigged ship
- Armament: 98 guns: Gundeck: 28 × 32 pdrs; Middle gundeck: 30 × 18 pdrs; Upper gundeck: 30 × 12 pdrs; Quarterdeck: 8 × 12 pdrs; Forecastle: 2 × 12 pdrs

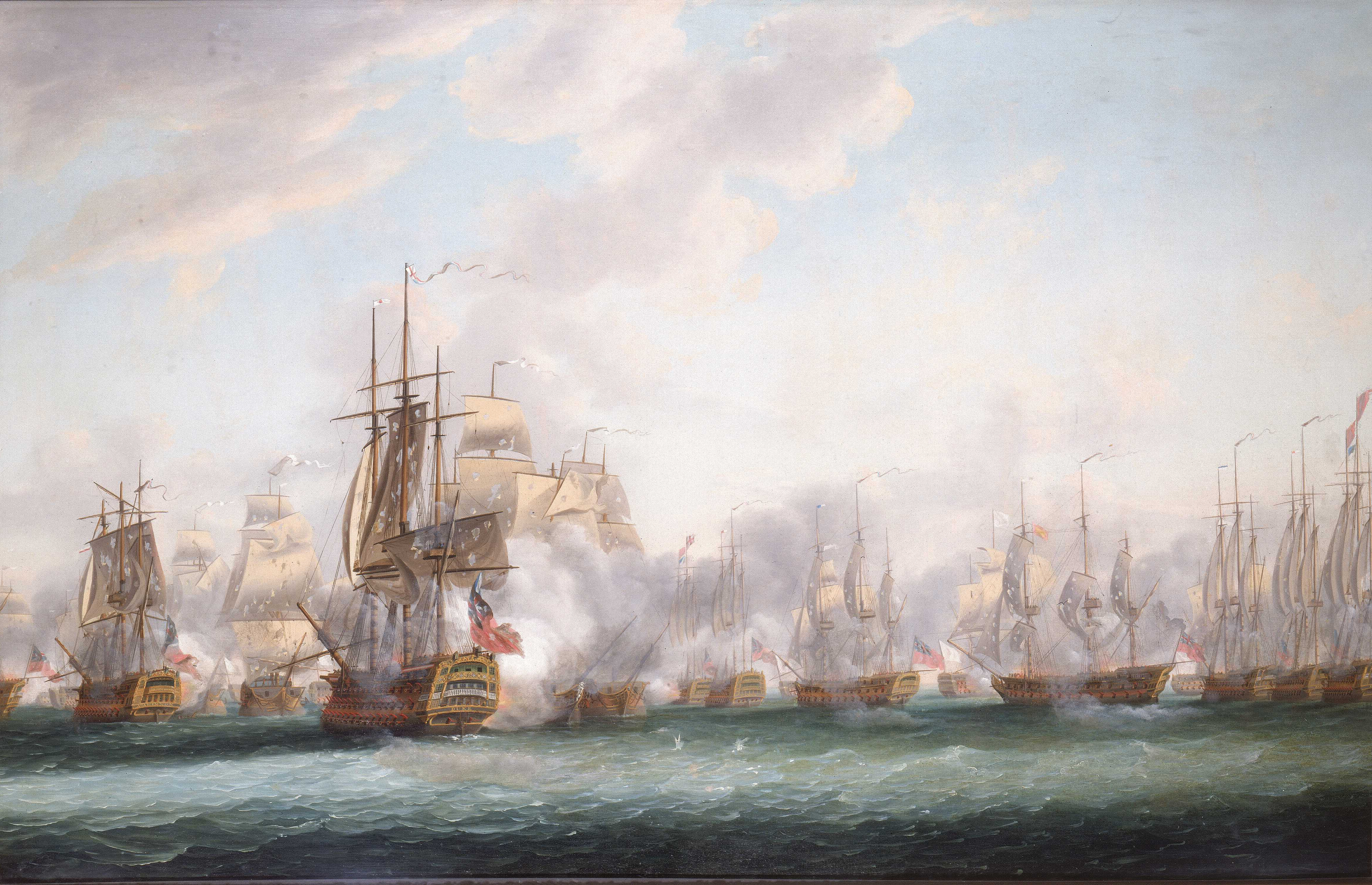
The Battle of the Saints, 12 April 1782, by Nicholas Pocock. Dominating the left foreground the ‘'Duke'’ is moving in to break the line and engage two French ships

HMS Duke was a 98-gun second rate ship of the line of the Royal Navy, launched on 18 October 1777 at Plymouth.

She was named after the Duke of Cumberland of Culloden fame and had a figurehead of the Duke.

She was at the Battle of Ushant in July 1778 and the Battle of the Saintes' (known to the French as the Bataille de la Dominique), or Battle of Dominica, that took place 9 April 1782 – 12 April 1782, during the American Revolutionary War. Under command of Captain Alan Gardner (later Baron Gardner) she served in the white squadron under overall control of Admiral George Rodney.

Duke was employed on harbour service from 1799, and was broken up in 1843.
