= HMS Princess Royal (1773) =

Ship of the line of the Royal Navy

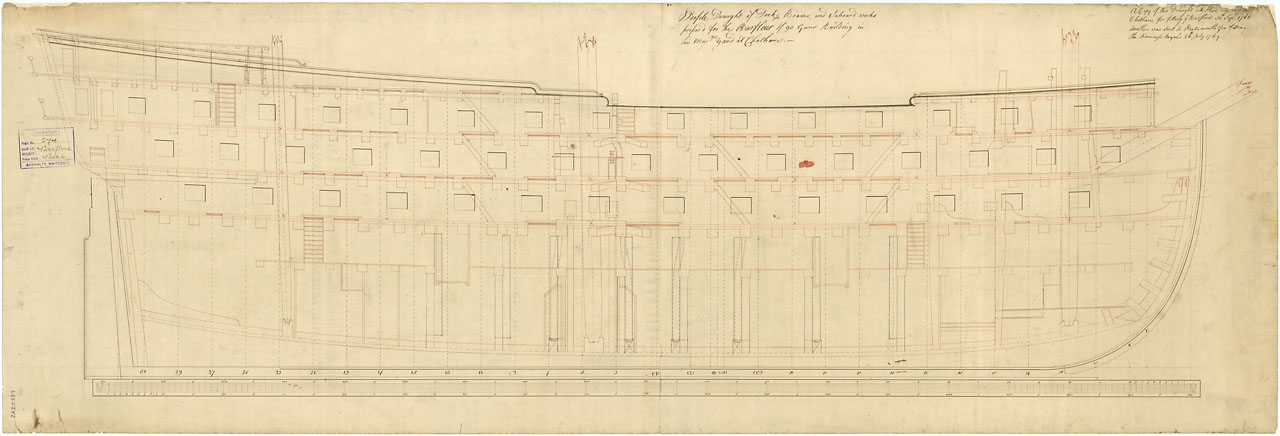
- Princess Royal

History

Great Britain
- Name: HMS Princess Royal
- Ordered: 10 September 1767
- Builder: Portsmouth Dockyard
- Laid down: 31 October 1767
- Launched: 18 October 1773
- Honours and awards: Participated in: Naval Battle of Genoa; Naval Battle of Hyères Islands
- Fate: Broken up, 1807

General characteristics
- Class & type: Barfleur-class ship of the line
- Tons burthen: 1973 (bm)
- Length: 177 ft 6 in (54.10 m) (gundeck)
- Beam: 50 ft 3 in (15.32 m)
- Depth of hold: 21 ft (6.4 m)
- Propulsion: Sails
- Sail plan: Full-rigged ship
- Complement: 750 officers and men
- Armament: 90 guns: Gundeck: 28 × 32-pounder guns; Middle gundeck: 30 × 18-pounder guns; Upper gundeck: 30 × 12-pounder guns; Fc: 2 × 9-pounder guns; 98 guns: Gundeck: 28 × 32-pounder guns; Middle gundeck: 30 × 18-pounder guns; Upper gundeck: 30 × 12-pounder guns; QD: 8 × 12-pounder guns; Fc: 2 × 9-pounder guns

HMS Princess Royal was a 90-gun second rate ship of the line of the Royal Navy, launched on 18 October 1773 at Portsmouth. During her career she was upgraded to a 98-gun ship, by the addition of eight 12 pdr guns to her quarterdeck.

May, 1778 under command of Capt. William Blair.

In 1795, Princess Royal took part in the Naval Battle of Genoa and the Naval Battle of Hyères Islands under Captain John Child Purvis.

She was broken up in 1807.
