= French ship Scipion (1778) =

Ship of the line of the French Navy

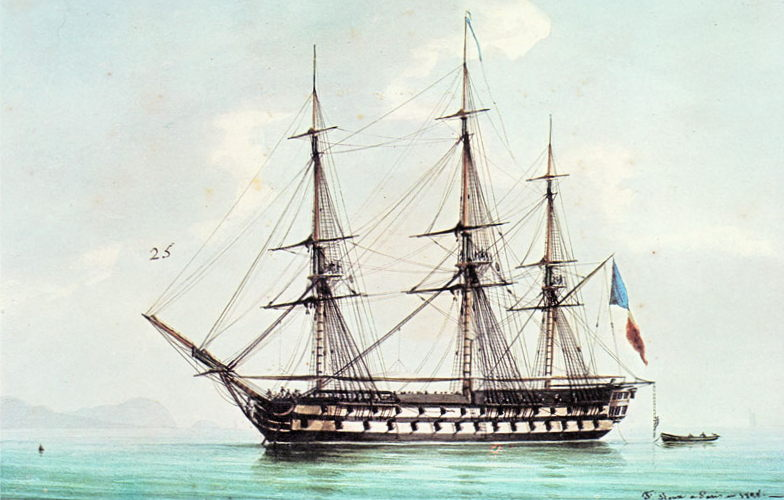
- Pluton, Scipion's sister ship

History

France
- Name: Scipion
- Launched: 17 September 1778
- Honours and awards: Participated in: Battle of the Chesapeake; Action of 18 October 1782
- Fate: Ran aground 1782

General characteristics
- Class & type: Scipion-class ship of the line
- Displacement: 2,943 tonneaux
- Tons burthen: 1,424 port tonneaux
- Length: 53.8 m (177 ft)
- Beam: 14.1 m (46 ft)
- Draught: 7.3 m (24 ft)
- Propulsion: Sails
- Armament: 74 to 78 guns of various weights of shot

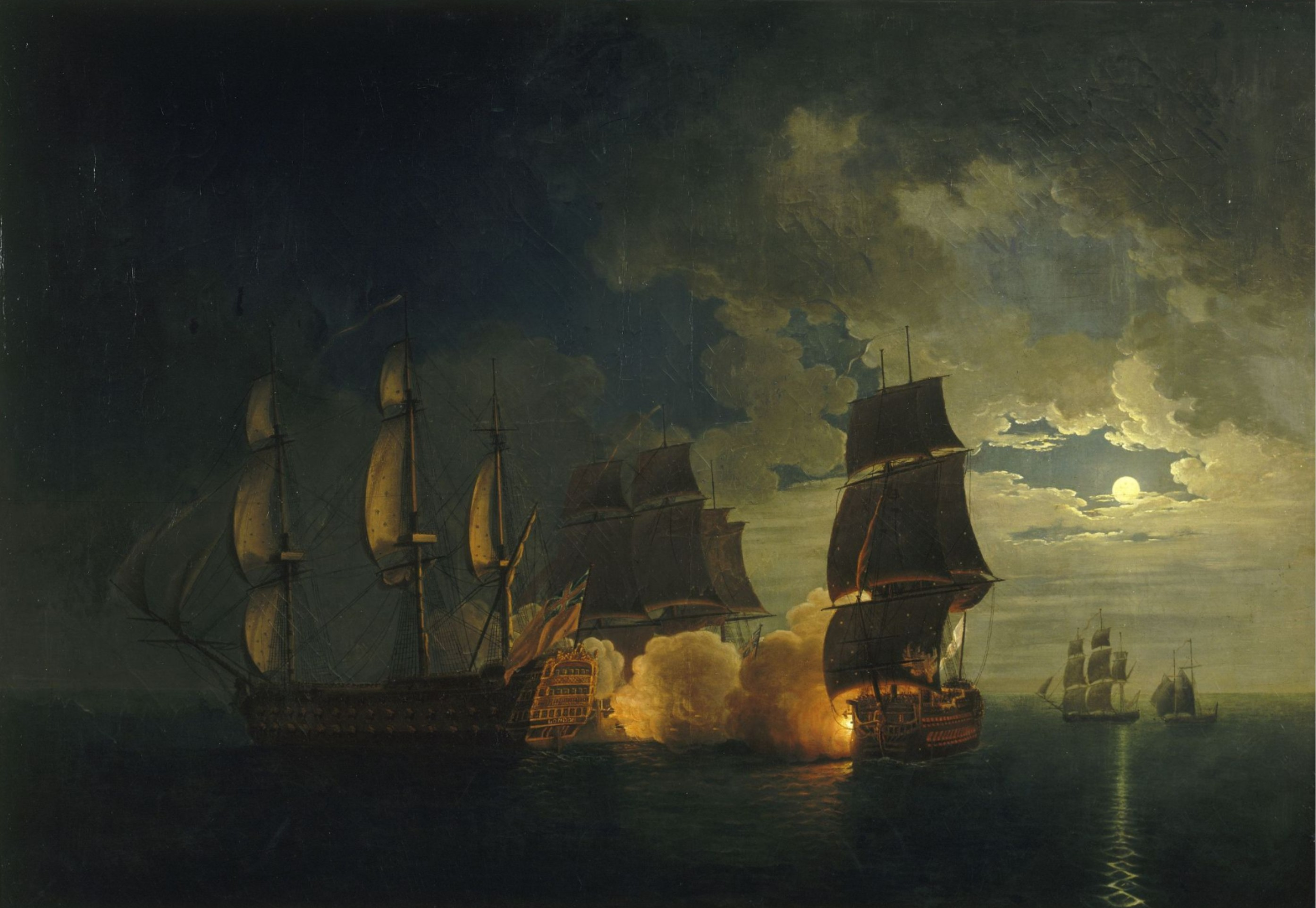
Scipion (third from right) at the action of 18 October 1782

Scipion was a 74-gun Scipion-class ship of the line of the French Navy. She was completed in 1779. Accounts cited that she was one of the three new naval vessels - along with Hercule (1798) and Pluton (1778) - built by the French that was so top-heavy, they nearly capsized. To correct Scipion's problem, a stowage was altered and a ballast replaced a part of the water supply. These remedies, however, failed so the French had to shorten the mast to make the ship seaworthy.

Scipion took part in the American War of Independence, notably sailing at the rear of the French squadron at the Battle of the Chesapeake under Antoine Pierre de Clavel. In the action of 18 October 1782, under Captain Nicolas Henri de Grimouard, Scipion fought gallantly against two British ships of the line of 90 and 74 guns. Through good sailmanship, she managed to damage HMS London and escape, but was destroyed the next day after she was chased and ran aground.
