= Action of 18 October 1782 =

- Part of the American Revolutionary War
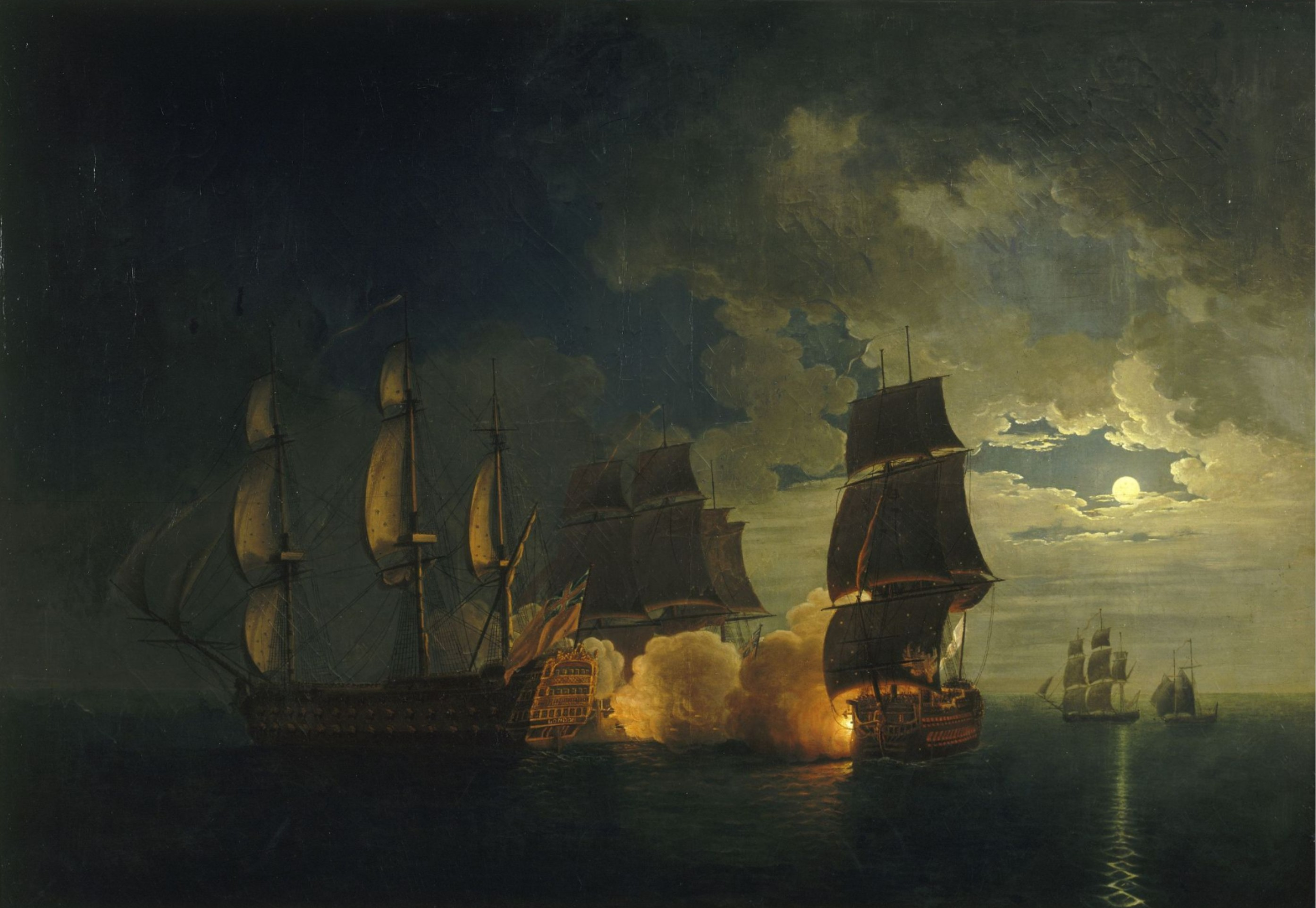
- Painting of the action by Auguste-Louis de Rossel de Cercy
Date	17–18 October 1782
Location	Off Hispaniola, Caribbean Sea 19°11′N 69°19′W
Result	Inconclusive

Belligerents
Great Britain	France

Commanders and leaders
James Kempthorne	Nicolas de Grimouard

Strength
2 ships of the line	1 ship of the line 1 frigate

Casualties and losses
11 killed 75 wounded	15 killed 46 wounded 1 ship of the line sunk

The action of 18 October 1782 was a minor naval engagement of the American Revolutionary War, in which the French 74-gun ship of the line Scipion, accompanied by the 40-gun frigate Sibylle, was chased by two Royal Navy ships of the line, the 98-gun HMS London and the 74-gun Torbay. Outmanoeuvring her larger opponents, Scipion obtained a favourable position that allowed her to rake London, causing severe damage and allowing her to continue running from the superior British force. Scipion went to anchor in Samaná Bay but while doing so hit a rock and sank, while Sibylle succeeded in escaping the area.

== Battle ==
On 17 October 1782, during the American Revolutionary War, a British squadron consisting of the 98-gun ship of the line HMS London, 74-gun ship of the line HMS Torbay, and 14-gun sloop HMS Badger was sailing off the coast of San Domingo when they spotted two strange sails. (Note: Badger was not involved in any of the action itself.) The squadron chased the ships to the north-west and discovered them to be the French 74-gun ship of the line Scipion and her consort the 40-gun frigate Sibylle. At 2:24 p.m. London, Captain James Kempthorne, had succeeded in coming within range of Scipion, Captain Nicolas Henri de Grimouard, and the two ships of the line began a running fight mostly with the use of their chase guns and the occasional broadside from London. Sibylle went to the assistance of her compatriot and attacked London's bow as she concentrated on Scipion, inflicting much damage. London continued to close on Scipion until finally at 8:30 p.m. they began to trade broadsides alongside each other. The bombardment continued until 8:50 p.m. when the two ships of the line crashed together, with Scipion's cathead coming alongside London's starboard gangway.

The close proximity of the vessels allowed muskets and other small arms to come into effect, with each side firing into the groups of men operating their opponent's upper deck guns and causing much carnage. Soon however Scipion managed to get clear of her opponent by backing away from her, and sailed astern of her, where she raked London. The fire of Scipion, going from stern to bow of the British ship, destroyed much of her rigging and masts, leaving her disabled. While Scipion had been manoeuvring around London, Torbay, Captain John Gidoin, had finally managed to come into action and began firing into Scipion's larboard side, but the now-disabled London crashed into her as she went about her work, leaving both British ships tangled together.

At 10:20 p.m. Scipion stopped firing and Sibylle escaped from the action. Concluding that the French ship of the line had surrendered, London attempted to come up and take possession of her, but was unable to do so because of the state of her rigging. Kempthorne charged Gidoin with sailing towards Scipion, but while this was happening the French ship caught a gust of wind and began to sail away. After re-organising themselves the British ships began their chase once again. They did so through the night of 17–18 October, but despite exchanging some shots the French succeeded in lengthening the distance between them and their pursuers, so that by the morning of 18 October Torbay, the lead ship, was a mile and a half behind Scipion. By 3:30 p.m. Torbay had succeeded in gaining ground on Scipion and Gidoin began to fire into her, at which point Scipion sailed into Samaná Bay, in what is now the Dominican Republic, and attempted to anchor there. Despite having escaped from a British force over twice as strong, she struck a rock and sank in the bay. Scipion was a total loss but her crew escaped almost intact from the action.

== Aftermath ==
Louis XVI made Grimouard, who had been wounded in the action, a count for his actions in fighting off and then successfully escaping the superior British squadron, and commissioned a painting of the action from Auguste-Louis de Rossel de Cercy. Kempthorne was put in front of a court of enquiry because of his inability to take Scipion in open action, but he was honourably acquitted of all charges.

== Combatant summary ==
In this table, "Guns" refers to all cannon carried by the ship, including the maindeck guns which were taken into consideration when calculating its rate, as well as any carronades carried aboard. Broadside weight records the combined weight of shot which could be fired in a single simultaneous discharge of an entire broadside.

Ship	Commander	Navy	Guns	Tons	Broadside weight	Complement	Casualties		
Ship	Commander	Navy	Guns	Tons	Broadside weight	Complement	Killed	Wounded	Total
London	Captain James Kempthorne	Royal Navy	98	1,894bm	1,108 pounds (503 kg)	743	11	72	83
Torbay	Captain John Lewis Gidoin	Royal Navy	74	1,572bm	828 pounds (376 kg)	594	Unknown		
Scipion	Captain Nicolas Henri de Grimouard	French Navy	74	Unknown	828 pounds (376 kg)	734	15	43 (Note: Allen reports 46 wounded.)	58
Sibylle	Unknown	French Navy	40	Unknown	174 pounds (79 kg)	275	Unknown		
