= Fourth Anglo-Dutch War =

War between Great Britain and Dutch Republic, 1780–1784

- Part of the American Revolutionary War and the Anglo-Dutch Wars
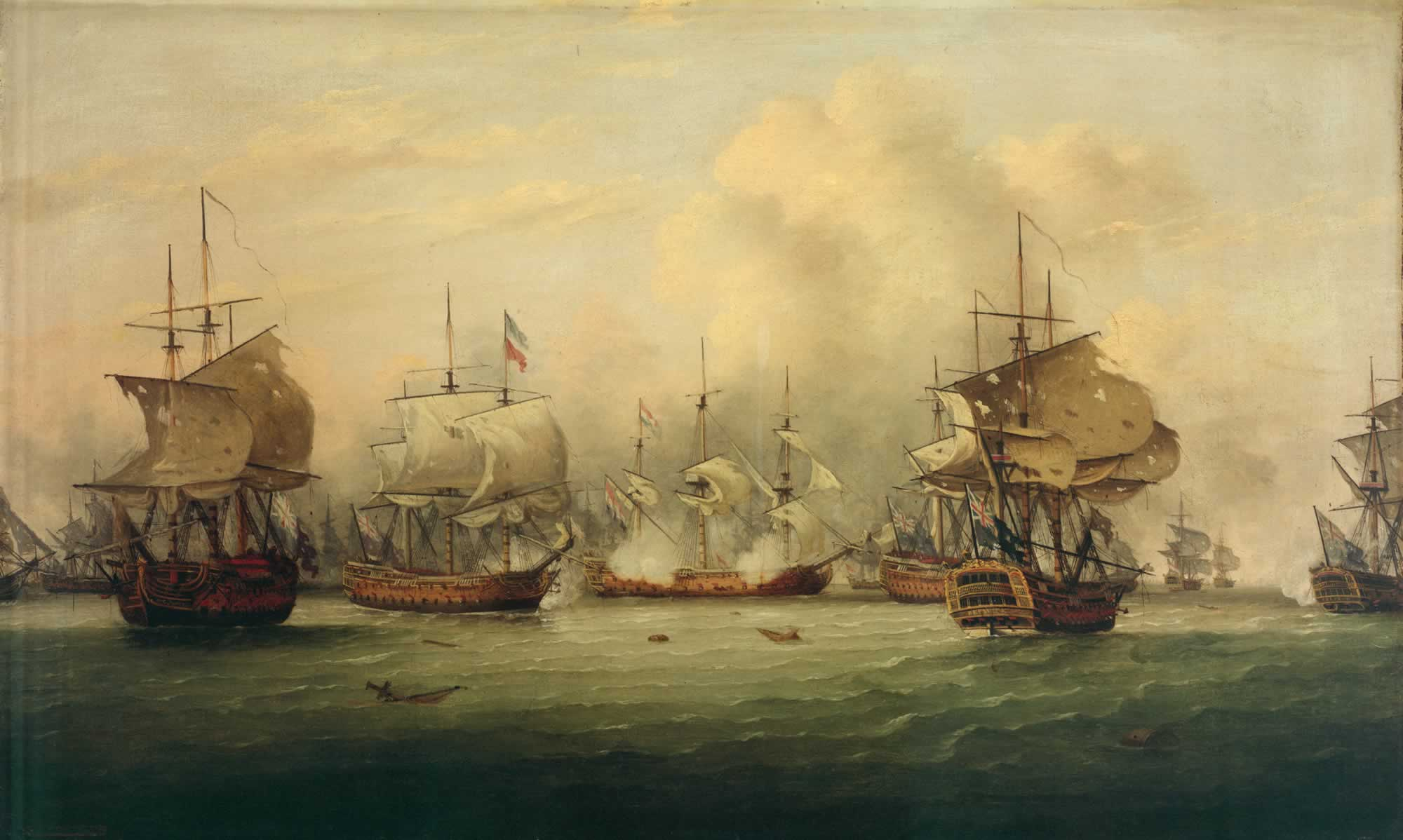
- The Battle of Dogger Bank, 5 August 1781; Thomas Luny, 1781
Date	1780–1784 (4 Years)
Location	North Sea, India, Ceylon, Sumatra, Caribbean, Cape Colony
Result	Peace of Paris (1783)
Territorial changes	Dutch Republic cedes Nagapatnam to Great Britain

Belligerents
Great Britain	Dutch Republic; (Kingdom of France) France; Mysore

Commanders and leaders
(Kingdom of Great Britain) George III; Hyde Parker; Edward Hughes; George Rodney; George Johnstone	William V; Johan Zoutman; Jan Kinsbergen; Iman Falck; Bailli de Suffren

The Fourth Anglo-Dutch War (Dutch: Vierde Engels-Nederlandse Oorlog; 1780–1784) was a conflict between the Kingdom of Great Britain and the Dutch Republic. The war, contemporary with the American Revolutionary War (1775–1783), broke out over British and Dutch disagreements on the legality and conduct of Dutch trade with Britain's enemies in that war.

Although the Dutch Republic did not enter into a formal alliance with the insurgent Americans and their French and Spanish allies, American envoy (and future president) John Adams had his credentials accepted as ambassador, establishing diplomatic relations with the Dutch Republic, making it the second European country to diplomatically recognize the United States of America in April 1782 as a sovereign nation. In October 1782, a treaty of amity and commerce was concluded as well.

Most of the war consisted of a series of British operations against Dutch colonial economic interests, although British and Dutch naval forces also met once off the Dutch coast. The war ended disastrously for the Dutch and exposed the weakness of the political and economic foundations of the republic. The war exposed the decline of the Dutch Empire since the early 18th century, and further cemented Great Britain as the leading commercial power between the two empires.

== Background ==
Although Great Britain and the Dutch Republic had been allies since the Glorious Revolution of 1688, the Dutch had become very much the junior partner in the alliance and had slowly lost their former dominance of world trade to the British. During the Second Stadtholderless Period, the Dutch Republic had more or less abdicated its pretences as a major power and this became painfully evident to the rest of Europe during the War of the Austrian Succession. Near the end of that war in 1747, an Orangist revolution restored the stadtholderate with vastly increased powers for the stadtholder and made the stadtholderate hereditary. This did not lead to a resurgence of the republic as a major power because of what many in the republic saw as the mismanagement of the stadtholderian regency during the minority of stadtholder William V, and subsequently during his own reign. Instead, the republic remained neutral during the Seven Years' War, which enabled it to avoid expanding its army and navy. The stadtholderian regime was pro-British, with the stadtholder being a grandson of King George II of Great Britain, but his opponents for this reason favoured France, and those opponents were strong enough in the States General of the Netherlands (the governing body of the Republic whose "first servant" the stadtholder was) to keep Dutch foreign policy neutral.

Initially, the British looked to the Dutch as a source of assistance to defeat the American rebels. After the conflict began in 1775, the British government requested its Dutch counterpart loan out the Scots Brigade of the Dutch States Army for service in North America, in a similar manner to the Hessian troops rented out by various German states. The request was met with a hostile reception from Dutch sympathisers with the American Revolution, led by Baron Joan Derk van der Capellen tot den Pol, who convinced the States General to turn it down.

More importantly, Dutch merchants, especially those from Amsterdam, became involved in the supply of arms and munitions to the American rebels soon after the outbreak of American Revolutionary War. This trade was mainly conducted via the Caribbean entrepôt of St. Eustatius, an island colony of the Dutch West India Company. There, American colonial wares, such as tobacco and indigo, were imported (in contravention of the British Navigation Acts) and re-exported to Europe. For their return cargo, the Americans bought arms, munitions, and naval stores brought to the island by Dutch and French merchants. In 1776 the governor of the island, Johannes de Graeff, was the first to salute the flag of the United States, leading to growing British suspicions of the Dutch. In 1778, France declared war on Britain, with the Dutch choosing to remain neutral. The British government invoked a number of Anglo-Dutch treaties (signed in 1678, 1689, 1716) to have the Dutch support them militarily, but as in the Seven Years' War, the States General clung to its neutrality.

After the French declared war on Britain, Amsterdam merchants also became heavily involved in the trade in naval stores with France. The French needed those supplies for their naval construction, but were prevented from obtaining those themselves, due to the blockade by the Royal Navy (France being the weaker naval power in that conflict). The Dutch were privileged by a concession obtained as a result of the Second Anglo-Dutch War, known as the principle of "free ship, free goods", which was enshrined in the Anglo-Dutch Commercial Treaty of 1668, reconfirmed in the Treaty of Westminster (1674). This early formulation of the principle of Freedom of Navigation exempted all but narrowly defined "contraband" goods carried in Dutch ships from confiscation in British prize courts in wars in which the Dutch remained neutral. According to the treaty, naval stores, including ship's timbers, masts, spars, canvas, tar, rope, and pitch, were not contraband and the Dutch, therefore, were free to continue their trade with France in these goods. Because of the still-important role of the Dutch in the European carrying trade, this opened up a large loophole in the British embargo. The British responded by declaring naval stores to be contraband and enforced the declaration by seizing Dutch ships carrying naval stores.

This led to strong protests by the affected Dutch merchants, who demanded merchant convoys be escorted by the Dutch States Navy to prevent them from being seized by British warships or privateers. At the time, such convoys were generally exempt from the right of visit and search by belligerents. Initially, the stadtholder managed to resist the merchants' demands, but strong diplomatic pressure by France, that selectively applied economic sanctions to Dutch cities supporting the stadtholder in this policy, forced his hand in November 1779. The States General now ordered him to provide the escorts and the first convoy, under command of Lodewijk van Bylandt, sailed in December. This led to the affair of Fielding and Bylandt on 31 December, which enraged Dutch public opinion and further undermined the position of the stadtholder. The incident motivated the Dutch to seek admission to the First League of Armed Neutrality, which espoused the principle of "free ship, free goods", especially after the British formally abrogated the Commercial Treaty of 1668. The Dutch hoped to gain the armed support of the other members of the league to maintain their neutral status.

== War ==
=== Declaration of war ===
The British government saw the danger of this move (it might embroil Great Britain in war with Russia and the Nordic powers Sweden and Denmark–Norway also), so declared war on the republic shortly after it announced its intentions in December 1780. To forestall Russia from coming to the aid of the Dutch (something Empress Catherine II of Russia was not keen on, either), the British government cited a number of grievances that were ostensibly unrelated to the Dutch accession to the league. One of these was the shelter the Dutch had (reluctantly) given to the American privateer John Paul Jones in 1779. More importantly, much was made of a draft treaty of commerce, secretly negotiated between the Amsterdam banker Jean de Neufville and the American agent in Aix-la-Chapelle, William Lee, with the connivance of the Amsterdam pensionary Van Berckel, and found among the effects of Henry Laurens, an American diplomat who had been apprehended by the British cruiser HMS Vestal in September 1780, on the high seas. He had been sent by the Continental Congress to establish diplomatic relations with the Dutch Republic. The draft treaty was cited as proof by the British of the non-neutral conduct of the Dutch.

=== Progress of the war ===
Dutch naval power had been in decline since 1712. The fleet had been long neglected, and the Dutch navy, having only 20 ships of the line at the start of the conflict, was no match for the British Royal Navy. Although the States General had decided on a substantial expansion of the fleet in 1779, just before the fateful decision to offer limited convoys, and had even voted the funds for such a naval-construction program, it progressed but slowly. Another reason for the slow expansion of the Dutch fleet was a lack of suitable recruits—the Dutch navy paid lower wages than the merchant marine and did not use impressment like the Royal Navy. The number of available ships was diminished even more at the start of the war when several ships were captured by the British in the West Indies because they were unaware the war had started. A convoy under Rear Admiral Willem Krul was lost this way near St. Eustatius in February 1781, and the admiral was killed in the short action; in a different action, Captain Bylandt (a nephew of the admiral of the same name) surrendered his ship.

The pronounced inferiority of the Dutch fleet, and its state of "unreadiness" was a frequently reiterated excuse for the Dutch naval commanders, especially Vice Admiral Andries Hartsinck, who commanded the Texel squadron, to keep the fleet at anchor, thereby ceding dominance of the North Sea to the blockading British fleet. Within a few weeks of the beginning of the war, more than 200 Dutch merchantmen, with cargo to the amount of 15 million guilders, had been captured by the British and 300 more were locked up in foreign ports.

Another reason for the lack of activity of the Dutch navy was that diplomatic activity never ceased and gave the Dutch government the illusion that the war would be of only short duration. Empress Catharine, though she refused to come to the aid of the Dutch, was very active in offering her services to mediate the dispute. Both the British and the Dutch, with varying amounts of sincerity, cooperated in these diplomatic manoeuvres, which came to nothing, but helped to keep military activities at a low level while they lasted.

The British government also made overtures to the Dutch to come to a speedy conclusion of hostilities, especially after the cabinet of Lord North had been replaced by that of Rockingham and Fox in March 1782. Fox immediately proposed a separate peace on favourable conditions to the Dutch government. Unfortunately for the Dutch, they had just bound themselves closer to France by agreeing to act "in concert" with France in naval actions, so a separate peace was no longer an option. A real military alliance with France was, however, still blocked by the stadtholder, despite many in the republic favouring it.

The war, as far as it went, was fought in three main theatres. Britain blockaded Dutch ports in Europe, and embarked on expeditions to seize Dutch colonial properties throughout the world. These were almost entirely successful; only an attempt to capture the Dutch Elmina Castle on the Africa's Gold Coast (modern Ghana) failed. While many Dutch territories in the West Indies were taken by the British, some, like Curaçao, were not attacked due to their defensive strength.

==== West Indies ====
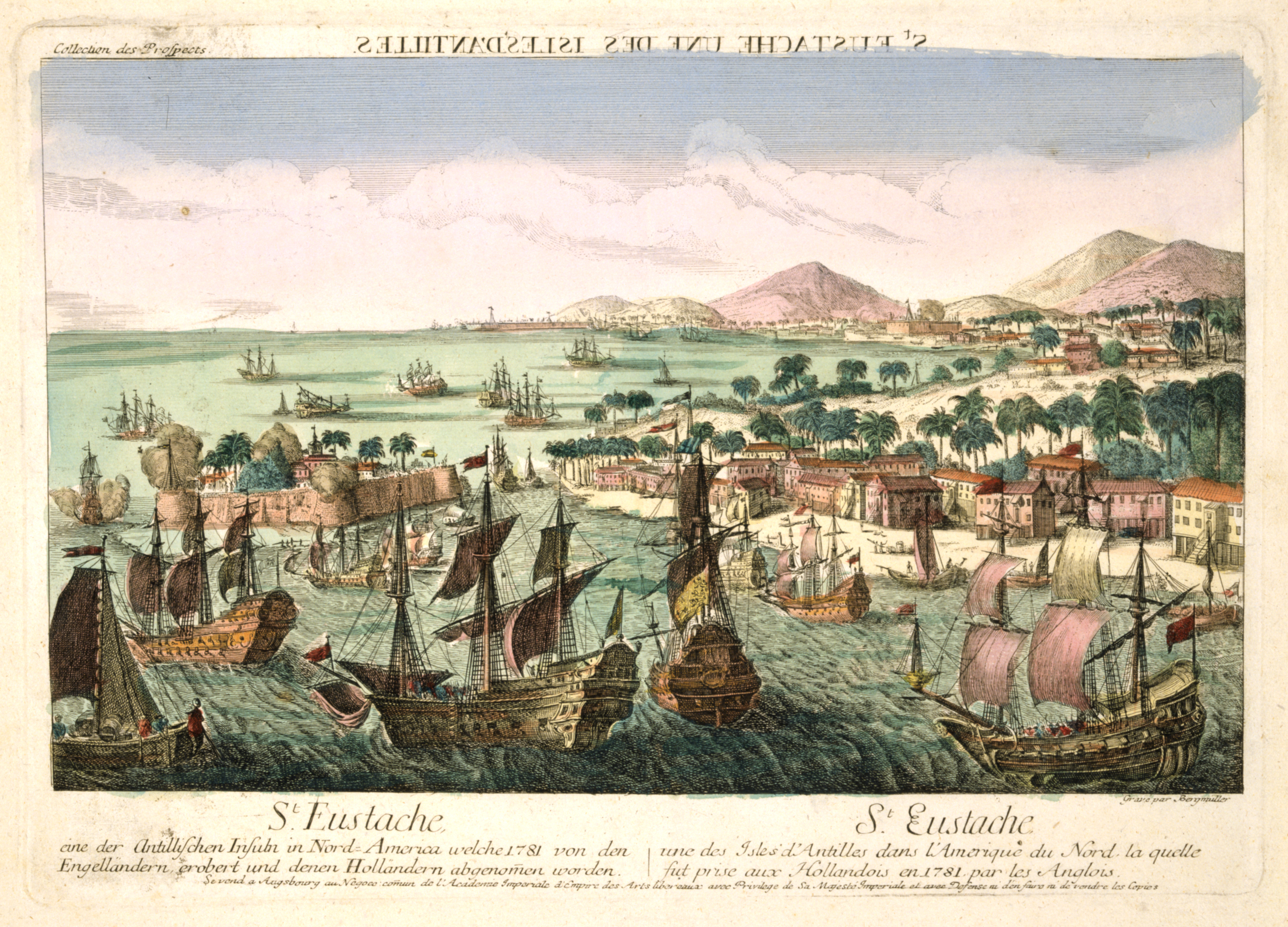
The capture of St Eustatius by the British fleet in February 1781. The island is sacked by the British.

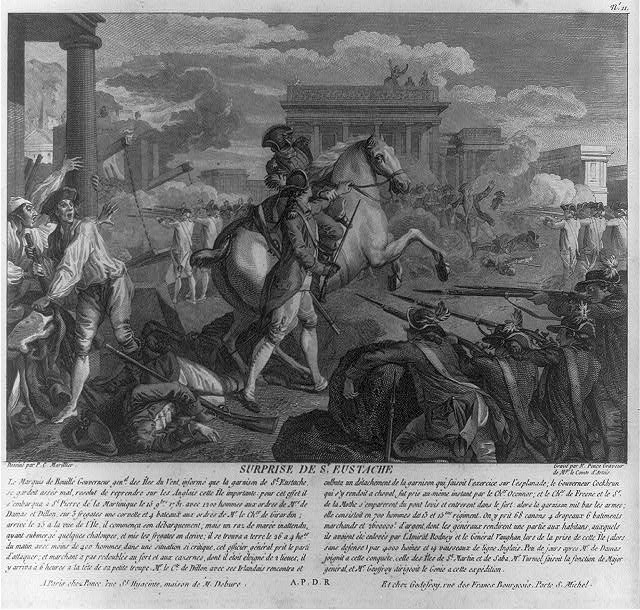
The same year, the island is issued by a French landing troops.

As far as the Dutch were concerned, the war in the West Indies was over almost before it had begun. Admiral Rodney, the commander of the Leeward Islands station of the Royal Navy, attacked the Dutch colonies in that part of the Caribbean: St. Eustatius, Saba, and Saint Martin, as soon as he had received word of the declaration of war, in the process surprising a number of Dutch naval and merchant ships, which were still unaware of the start of hostilities. St. Eustatius (captured on 3 February 1781), that had played such a large role in the supply of the American rebels with arms, was completely devastated by him. He proved himself especially vengeful against the Jewish merchants on the island. All goods on the island were confiscated and all merchants, Dutch, American, French, even British, deported. Part of the loot was auctioned off on the spot, but an appreciable amount was put on a convoy destined for Britain. However, much of the convoy was captured in the English Channel by a French squadron under Admiral Picquet de la Motte. The French did not return the goods to the Dutch, however.

Though an attempt was made to likewise capture the Dutch Leeward Antilles, these remained in Dutch hands, as did Suriname, though neighbouring Berbice, Demerara, and Essequibo were rapidly taken by the British early in 1781. These were retaken by the French captain Armand de Kersaint in 1782, and restored to the Dutch after the war.

==== European waters ====
Admiral Hartsinck at first proved himself highly reluctant to risk his fleet. However, political pressure to venture outside the safety of the Texel roadstead mounted and several cautious attempts were made to capture British convoys, or escort Dutch convoys. In one of those forays, an unusually strong squadron, under Admiral Johan Zoutman and his second-in-command, Rear Admiral Jan Hendrik van Kinsbergen, encountered in August 1781 a British squadron of about equal strength under Admiral Hyde Parker in the Battle of Dogger Bank, which ended in a tactical draw.

Another promising venture seemed to be what has become known as the Brest Affair. In September 1782, after the Dutch politicians had hesitantly agreed to coordinate their actions with the French, acting "in concert", an opportunity seemed to exist to combine a Dutch squadron of 10 ships of the line with the French squadron at Brest, as the British fleet in the channel had suddenly sailed south. However, Hartsinck, as usual, made objections, based on intelligence that British ships lay in ambush. When this proved false, the stadtholder ordered him to send the squadron, under command of Vice Admiral Count Lodewijk van Bylandt to Brest. However, as had happened several times before, Bylandt, after having inspected the ships, declared them "unready" to put out to sea. In this refusal, he was supported by the other flag officers. The incident caused a political storm that threatened to engulf the stadtholder himself, as he was responsible as commander-in-chief for both the state of readiness of the fleet and its strategic decisions (though the officers were tactically and operationally responsible, and could not decline responsibility for the alleged state of "unreadiness" themselves). The opponents of the stadtholder demanded an investigation that was, however, very long drawn out, and quietly terminated after the stadtholder was restored in his full powers after 1787, long after the end of the war.

Though, except for the Battle of Dogger-Bank, no major engagements were fought in European waters, and the British blockade encountered little opposition from the Dutch fleet, the blockade itself exacted its toll on the British seamen, who were at sea for long times at a stretch (which even exposed them to the danger of scurvy) and the ships that suffered from severe wear and tear. Also, because an appreciable number of ships had to be detached to maintain naval superiority in the North Sea, the already overstretched Royal Navy was even more strained after 1781. Ships that were needed to blockade the Dutch coast could not be used against the French, Americans, and Spaniards in other theatres of war.

==== Asian waters ====
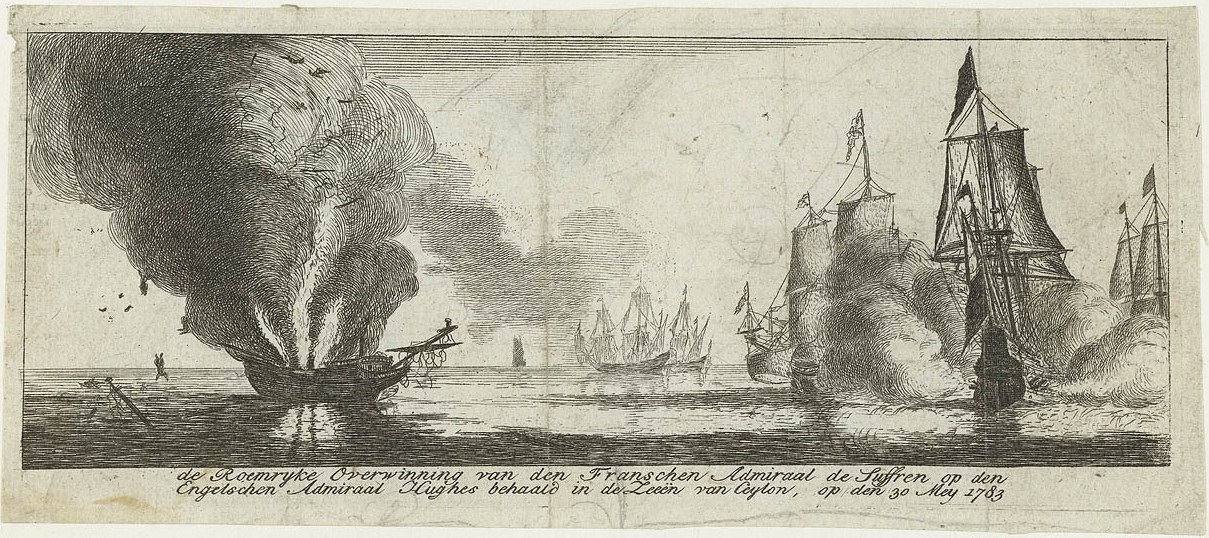
Glorious action of the French Admiral Suffren against the British Admiral Hughes in the seas of Ceylon. The intervention of the French navy attempted to rescue the Dutch colonies in Asia.

The Dutch East India Company (VOC) had been responsible for defending its own colonies east of the Cape Colony, but for the first time, had to request assistance from the Dutch navy. However, ships were lacking at first and what naval forces were available were unable to prevent Britain from taking full control of Dutch India. In early 1782 British Admiral Sir Edward Hughes captured Trincomalee on the eastern coast of Dutch Ceylon, considered to be the finest harbour in the Bay of Bengal.

In March 1781, British Admiral George Johnstone was sent to capture the Cape Colony. France, which had already planned to send a fleet to India, received intelligence of this, and directed its commander, the Bailli de Suffren, to try to reach the Cape before Johnstone. After Johnstone and Suffren met in a happenstance battle in the Cape Verde Islands, Suffren was able to arrive before Johnstone, and the strength of French troops he left dissuaded Johnstone from attacking the colony. After capturing a number of VOC ships in the nearby Saldanha Bay, he returned to North Atlantic waters.

Suffren had continued on to Isle de France (now Mauritius) and then India. There, he arrived and fought a number of actions against Hughes. Suffren attempted to take the Dutch port of Negapatam (taken by the British in 1781), but was frustrated by Hughes. In August, the French recaptured Trincomalee, and Suffren fought Hughes to a standstill in a naval battle several days later. The two fleets withdrew and the British repaired in Bombay while the French refitted in the Dutch colony of Sumatra. Hughes and Suffren met again in 1783, but news of preliminary peace between France and Britain ended hostilities in India.

In August 1781, word of the war reached Sumatra, where both the Dutch and British companies had trading outposts. The directors of the British company at Fort Marlborough received instructions from Bombay to destroy all of the Dutch outposts on the west coast of Sumatra. Quite fortuitously, a fleet of five East Indiamen arrived not long after, and the directors seized the opportunity for action. Henry Botham, one of the directors, commandeered the fleet, and with 100 company soldiers sailed for Padang. On 18 August, Jacob van Heemskerk, the VOC chief resident at Padang, surrendered all of the west coast outposts without a fight, unaware that Botham's force was relatively weak. The capture netted the British 500,000 florins in goods and money. The fortress at Padang was destroyed before the town was returned to VOC control in 1784.

=== Ceasefire and Treaty of Paris ===
The republic did not form a formal military alliance with France and her allies before the end of the war. A treaty of amity and commerce was, however, concluded with the Americans in October 1782, after John Adams, who succeeded Henry Laurens, had managed to obtain diplomatic recognition of the American republic from the States General in April 1782. The republic was the second European power (after France, but before Spain) to recognise the United States. Adams also succeeded in raising a substantial loan for the Americans on the still-significant Dutch capital market.

The republic involved itself in the peace congress that the French foreign minister, Vergennes, organised, negotiating separately with the British commissioners. The Dutch demands were not supported by the French, and this put them into an untenable position when the French and their allies went ahead with the signing of the general peace. The Dutch, therefore, were forced to sign a preliminary peace just before that general treaty was signed. The republic joined the armistice between Britain and France in January 1783. The signing of the Treaty of Paris (1783–1784) made Negapatnam, in India, a British colony. Ceylon was restored to Dutch control. The British gained the right of free trade with part of the Dutch East Indies, which had been a major war aim for British merchants. The French also returned the other Dutch colonies they had recaptured from the British, including the ones in the West Indies (like St. Eustatius that had been taken by Admiral Rodney in February 1781, but was retaken by the French Admiral De Grasse on 27 November 1781).

== Aftermath ==
The war proved a disaster for the Netherlands, particularly economically. It also proved to be confirmation of the weakening of Dutch power in the 18th century. In the immediate aftermath of the war, the bad result was blamed on the stadholder's mismanagement (if not worse) by his opponents, who coalesced into the Patriot party. These managed for a while to roll back a number of the reforms of the revolution of 1747, strongly diminishing his powers. However, the Patriot revolt was suppressed by the Prussian invasion of Holland in 1787. The Patriots were driven abroad, but returned in 1795 with the help of the French revolutionary armies and established a Batavian Republic in place of the old Dutch Republic. The Low Countries remained central to British strategic thinking, and they sent expeditionary forces to the Netherlands in 1793, 1799, and 1809. The war caused severe damage to the VOC, which already in a severe crisis, was to go bankrupt just a few years later.

== See also ==
- Anglo-Dutch Wars
- History of England
- History of the Netherlands
- British military history
- Dutch military history

== Sources ==
- Clodfelter, M. (2017). Warfare and Armed Conflicts: A Statistical Encyclopedia of Casualty and Other Figures, 1492–2015 (4th ed.). Jefferson, North Carolina: McFarland.
- Boswell, James (1782), The Scots Magazine, Volume 44, Edinburgh: Sands, Brymer, Murray and Cochran, OCLC 1765266
- Dirks, J. J. B. (1871), De Nederlandsche Zeemagt in Hare verschillende Tijdperken Geschetst. Deel 3 (in Dutch), Rotterdam: H. Nijgh
- Hobson, Rolf; Kristianson, Tom, eds. (2004), Navies in Northern Waters, Portland: Frank Cass, ISBN 0-7146-5541-4
- Israel, Jonathan (1995), The Dutch Republic: Its Rise, Greatness, and Fall, 1477–1806, Oxford: Clarendon Press, ISBN 0-19-873072-1
- Edler, F. (2001) [1911], The Dutch Republic and The American Revolution, Honolulu, Hawaii: University Press of the Pacific, ISBN 0-89875-269-8
- Adams, Julia (2005), The Familial State: Ruling Families And Merchant Capitalism In Early Modern Europe, Ithaca: Cornell University Press, ISBN 0-8014-3308-8
- Meinsma, Johannes Jacobus (1872), Geschiedenis van de Nederlandsche Oost-Indische Bezittingen (in Dutch), Delft: J. IJkema, OCLC 23421932
- Moore, Bob, ed. (2003), Colonial Empires Compared: Britain and the Netherlands, 1750–1850, Aldershot: Ashgate, ISBN 0-7546-0492-6
- Rodger, N. A. M. (2006), The Command of the Ocean: A Naval History of Britain 1649–1815, London: Penguin Books, ISBN 0-14-102690-1
- Schama, Simon (1977), Patriots and Liberators: Revolution in the Netherlands 1780–1813, New York: Knopf, ISBN 0-394-48516-5
- Scott, Hamish M. "Sir Joseph Yorke, Dutch politics and the origins of the fourth Anglo-Dutch war." The Historical Journal 31#3 (1988): 571–589.
- Simms, Brendan (2008), Three Victories and a Defeat: The Rise and Fall of the First British Empire, New York: Basic Books, ISBN 978-0-465-01332-6
- Francke, Johan (2019), Al die willen te kaap'ren varen. De Nederlandse commissievaart tijdens de Vierde Engelse Oorlog, 1780-1784, Zutphen: Walburg Pers, ISBN 978-94-6249325-4
