= Jan Hendrik van Kinsbergen =

Dutch naval officer (1735–1819)

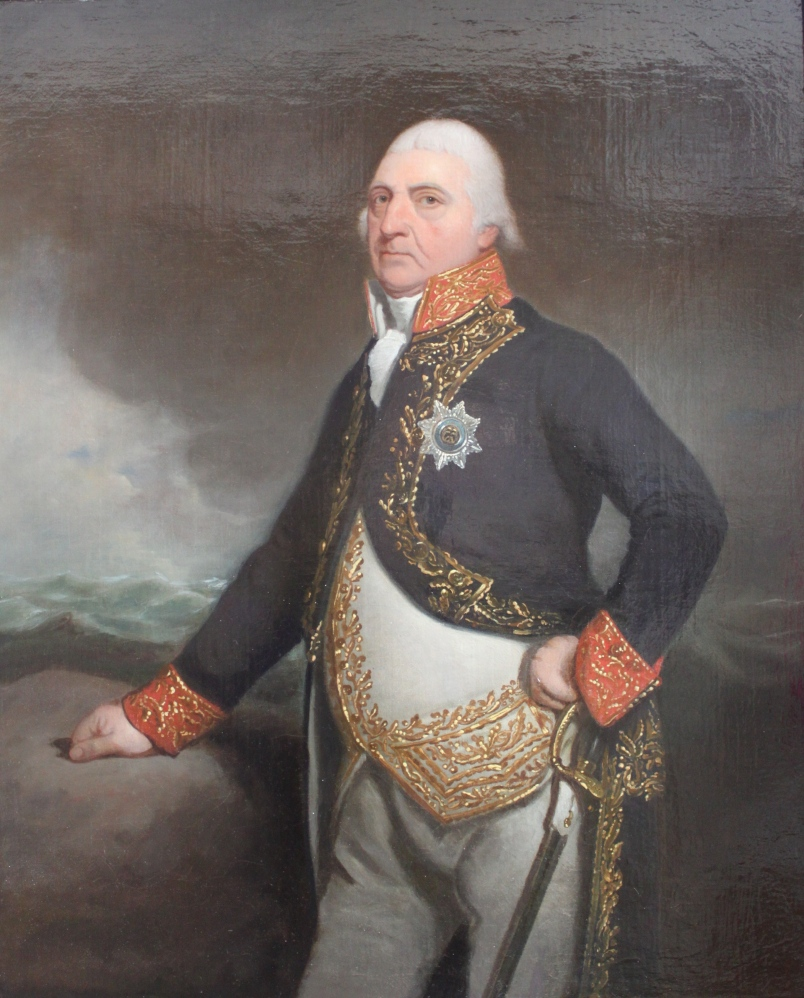
- Portrait by Charles Howard Hodges, 1806
- Born: 1 May 1735; Doesburg, Dutch Republic
- Died: 24 May 1819 (aged 84); Apeldoorn, Netherlands
- Military career
- Allegiance: Dutch Republic; Russian Empire; Kingdom of Holland; First French Empire; Kingdom of the Netherlands
- Branch: Dutch States Army; Dutch States Navy; Imperial Russian Navy; Navy of the Kingdom of Holland; French Imperial Navy; Royal Netherlands Navy
- Service years: 1744–1748 (Dutch States Army); 1756–1795 (Dutch States Navy); 1771–1775 (Imperial Russian Navy); 1806–1810 (Navy of the Kingdom of Holland); 1810–1813 (French Imperial Navy); 1813–1819 (Royal Netherlands Navy)
- Rank: Lieutenant admiral (Royal Netherlands Navy)
- Conflicts: Russo-Turkish War (1768–1774); Battle of Balaclava (1773); Battle of Sucukkale; Fourth Anglo-Dutch War; Battle of Dogger Bank (1781); War of the First Coalition; Low Countries theatre of the War of the First Coalition; War of the Sixth Coalition

Lieutenant-Admiral Jan Hendrik van Kinsbergen, Count of Doggerbank (1 May 1735 – 24 May 1819) was a Dutch naval officer who served in the Fourth Anglo-Dutch War and French Revolutionary and Napoleonic Wars. Having had a good scientific education, Van Kinsbergen was a proponent of fleet modernization and wrote several books about naval organization, discipline and tactics.

In 1773, he twice defeated the Ottoman Navy while serving in the Imperial Russian Navy. Returning to the Dutch Republic in 1775, he fought in the Fourth Anglo-Dutch War and eventually attained the position of commander-in-chief of the Dutch States Navy as a lieutenant admiral. When France conquered Holland in 1795 he was fired by the new Batavian Republic and prevented from becoming commander-in-chief of the Royal Dano-Norwegian navy, though the Kingdom of Holland reinstated him in 1806, in the rank of fleet marshal, and made him a count.

He was again degraded by the French Empire in 1810; after the liberation the United Kingdom of the Netherlands in 1814 honoured him with his old rank of lieutenant admiral. Van Kinsbergen, in his later life a very wealthy man, was also noted for his philanthropy, supporting poor relief, naval education, the arts and the sciences.

== Early life and career ==
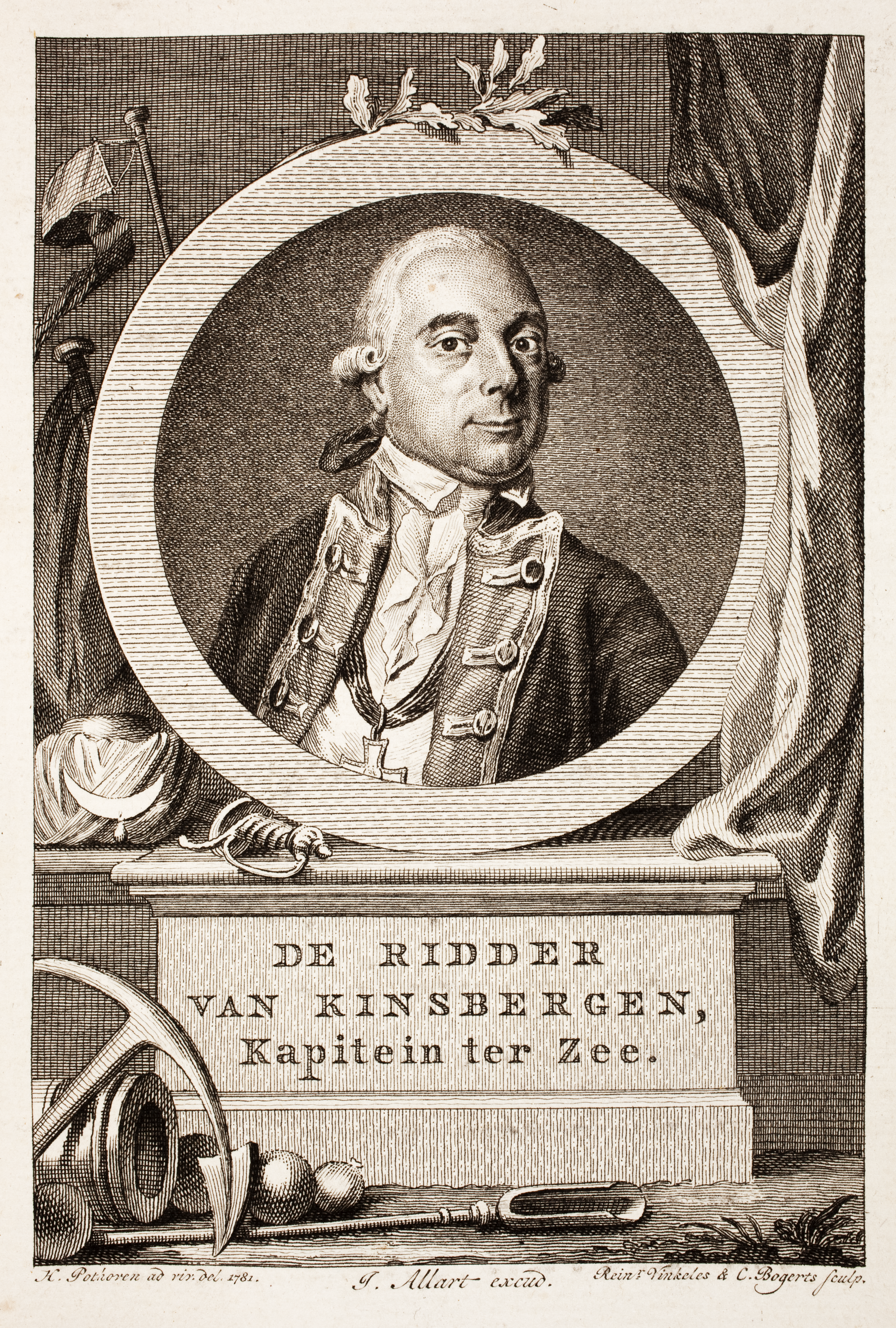
1781 portrait of van Kinsbergen

Jan Hendrik van Kinsbergen was born on 1 May 1735 in Doesburg, the eldest son of the non-commissioned officer Johann Henrich van Kinsbergen. His father had been born in Neunkirchen in 1706 and started his military career in the Imperial Army of the Holy Roman Emperor, and originally spelled his family name as "Ginsberg". When van Kinsbergen was six, he moved with his parents in 1741 to Elburg. Three years later, he left with his father for the Southern Netherlands and at the age of nine enlisted in the Dutch States Army during the War of the Austrian Succession, leaving the army and returning home in 1748. Reading the biography of Michiel de Ruyter by Gerard Brandt, he decided to become a naval officer as well and went to the naval academy of Groningen, where he was trained as an engineer between 1751 and 1755. In 1756, he joined the Dutch States Navy as a midshipman on Weststellingerwerf and on 16 March 1758 was promoted to lieutenant on the Maarsen, which was part of the Admiralty of Amsterdam.

Van Kinsbergen had three younger brothers; two enlisted in the Prussian Army; the youngest, Jan Hermanus, worked for the Dutch East India Company (VOC), but in 1770 was cashiered as a captain when his ship Leimuiden with a cargo of gold bars got stuck on the rocks of Boa Vista, Cape Verde. The ship was lost and Jan Hermanus returned four months after the shipwreck with 318 of the crew members. Jan Hermanus would be later appointed a naval captain through the influence of Jan Hendrik, embarrassing the latter by becoming involved in several major accidents. Jan Hendrik started serving on Amazone in 1761; he was made commander of the frigate Swieten on 13 October 1763.

== Russian service ==
In the late 1760s, due to severe financial difficulties, few Dutch warships were in active service and Van Kinsbergen used his free time to write a series of publications about naval modernisation. He is seen as a typical example of the new generation of Dutch naval officers of the era who no longer owed their position to either a career as a sea captain or a noble background but to a thorough scientific education.

In 1769, van Kinsbergen despaired of ever being promoted and obtained leave to enter the service of the VOC and depart for the Dutch Indies for four years. However, in the previous years he had already established a minor international reputation as a naval thinker, enthusiastically corresponding with many influential foreign contacts. He was informed by Prince Henry of Prussia that due to the ongoing Russo-Turkish War the Imperial Russian Navy was in search of naval experts. Henry immediately could obtain him a position there. On 15 August 1770, Van Kinsbergen got permission from the Dutch general admiral, stadholder William V, Prince of Orange, to depart for Russia. However, William V would not free him completely from his obligations. Van Kinsbergen was promised that on 15 August 1771 he would be promoted to captain in the Dutch navy. In exchange, by 1774 he would return to Holland should the Dutch navy have need of his services; this cycle of temporary appointments was to be repeated every three years.

In the summer of 1771, Jan Hendrik travelled via Berlin, where he visited Prince Henry, to Saint Petersburg where he on 29 September was appointed acting captain in the Russian navy; on 2 October he was promoted to captain 2nd rank. He immediately left for the Black Sea; on arrival he was charged with commanding a troop of Cossacks and fought, meanwhile learning Russian, on land during the winter campaign. In a fight he was shot through the knee and saved from under a heap of corpses by a Cossack, whom he would later get an appointment at the Amsterdam naval wharf.

From 9 February 1772 at Iaşi he repaired river vessels captured from the Ottoman Navy's Danube fleet. On 12 June he got his first naval command in Russian service, bringing dispatches on a galiot to Azov. From 13 November he brought dispatches from the southern army to Saint Petersburg. He was on that occasion introduced to Empress Catherine the Great and made a favourable impression on her with his enthusiastic plans for the Black Sea Fleet. Accordingly, on 23 April 1773 he became flotilla-commander in the Black Sea. His force was rather insignificant, consisting of just two 12-gun ketches and two yachts. Van Kinsbergen decided nevertheless that the moment had arrived to make a name for himself and acted as aggressively as his limited powers allowed. He entered the Sea of Marmara through the Bosporus, charted it as the first Western European ever, then entered the Dardanelles and finally returned to the Black Sea after duelling with an Ottoman coastal fortress in Constantinople.

Twice that year, he defeated an Ottoman fleet and won the title 'Hero of the Black Sea'. On 23 June, he encountered an Ottoman flotilla of one 74-gun ship of the line and three 52-gun frigates, and despite the disparity in firepower at once attacked and wiped the flotilla, the first major "Christian" naval victory in the Black Sea in four centuries. His superiors were very pleased and gave him permission to raid Sinope, but this was soon changed into a mission to intercept a transport fleet headed for the Crimea. In the morning of 2 September he spotted an Ottoman fleet off Novorossiysk but at the same time a messenger brought him the order to abandon the attack in view of the force imbalance: van Kinsbergen's original two ketches had only been reinforced by a single 32-gun frigate and a fire ship, while the Ottoman fleet numbered four ships of the line, seven frigates and six troopships with 5,000 troops aboard.

Determined to give battle anyway, van Kinsbergen declared in front of his officers that such an order could not possibly be authentic, arrested the messenger and pursued the attack. Conforming to the standard tactics of the day, the Ottoman fleet sailed in a formal line of battle. Van Kinsbergen realized that doing likewise would only result in the quick annihilation of his flotilla and therefore applied a modern concentration of forces: using the weather gauge he attacked the leading Ottoman vessel from the front, causing the following Ottoman ships to break formation. During the ensuing melee the Ottoman fleet got so damaged and confused that it abandoned the landing attempt and withdrew. Van Kinsbergen's insubordination was soon forgiven and he was on 22 September rewarded with by becoming a knight of the Order of St. George, although only the order's fourth degree, which disappointed him.

After the war, van Kinsbergen feared he would not be promoted and in November 1774 obtained a temporary discharge from Russian service. Although Catherine, who would gladly have kept him on in the Russian navy, promoted him to captain 1st rank and knight in the third degree (from 1776 even second degree) he asked to be allowed to return to the Dutch navy in May 1775, which was accepted. From August, he travelled via Saint Petersburg and Berlin to the Dutch Republic, obtained a final honourable discharge from Russian service in December, and early 1776 was back in the service of the Dutch navy.

== Return to the Dutch Republic ==
In 1776, van Kinsbergen was readmitted into the Admiralty of Amsterdam as a full captain, which raised quite a few eyebrows as the deal with stadtholder William had been kept a secret. In this period, Anglo-Dutch tensions caused by the American Revolutionary War, led to Dutch efforts to build up the fleet and therefore to increased career opportunities for Dutch officers. On 17 May 1776, van Kinsbergen was sent on an international expedition, as captain of Amphitrite, against Morocco to enforce a treaty upon Mohammed ben Abdallah to end the Dutch-Moroccan War, and to limit the activities of the Barbary corsairs; on 27 June he was as an envoy present at the signing of the treaty at Salé, returning to the Republic in October. In 1778 he was captain of the frigate Argo; in October he went again to Salé to deliver the treaty document ratified by the States-General of the Netherlands. After returning, Argo was part of the convoy temporarily detained by a superior British fleet on 31 December 1779 in search of French contraband, which became known as the affair of Fielding and Bylandt.

The Dutch public was outraged by this event, refusing to further cooperate with measures directed at blockading the United States. War with Britain became inevitable, even though the Dutch were ill-prepared for it. In 1780, van Kinbergen became a member of a commission that should strengthen the Dutch coastal defences. Meanwhile, he had published a great number of articles and booklets regarding naval reorganisation; in 1780 his Sailor's Compendium appeared, written with cooperation of the religious author Joannes Florentius Martinet and aimed at improving discipline. Officers should themselves be an exemplary role model and abstain from gambling, boozing, whoring and swearing — except in the latter case when giving orders, as in Van Kinsbergen's experience they tended to be followed much better if containing a few curses.

== Late Republican naval service ==
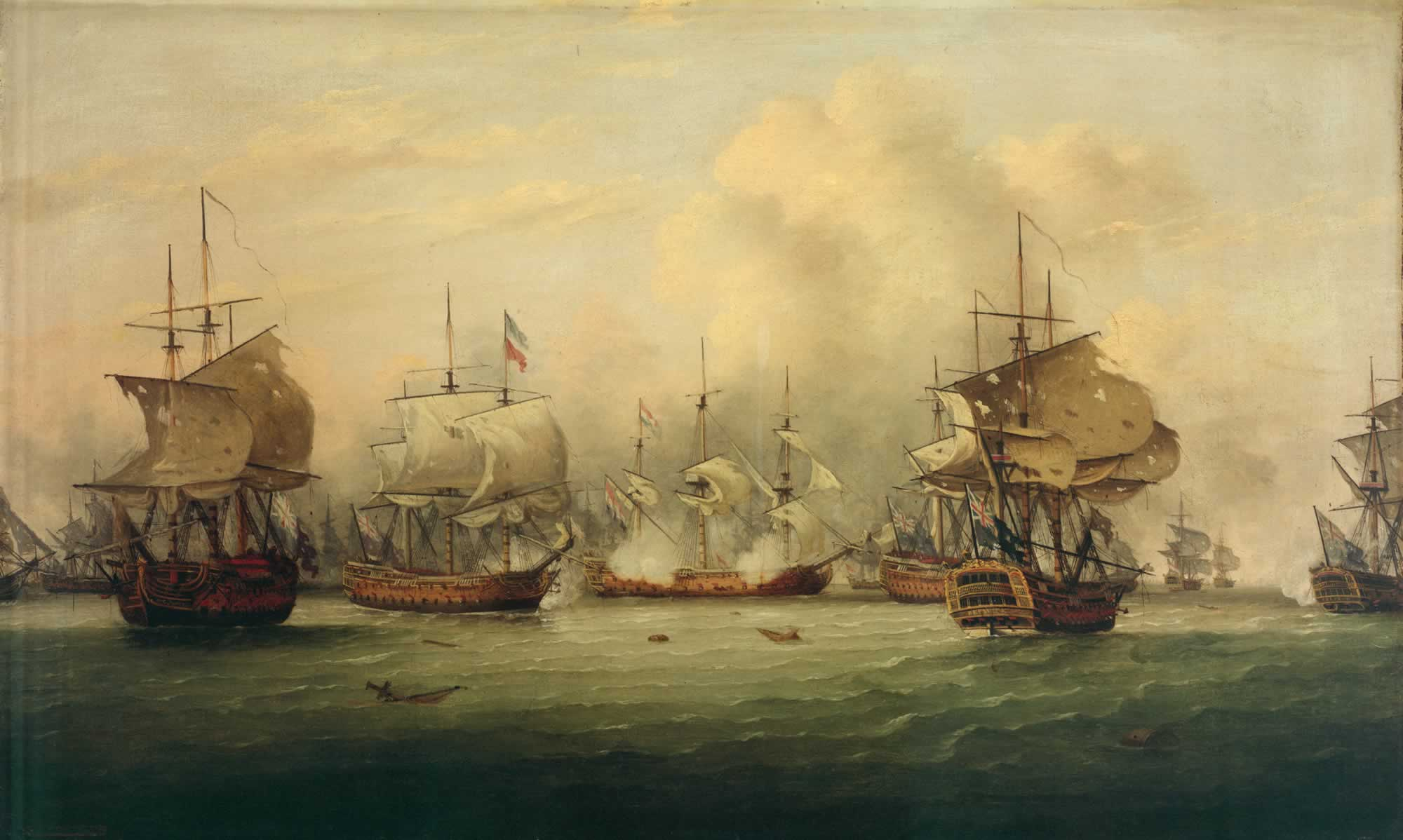
1781 painting of the Battle of Dogger Bank by Thomas Luny

In 1780, Britain declared war on the Dutch Republic, initiating the Fourth Anglo-Dutch War. The inferior Dutch home fleet mostly avoided a direct confrontation but Van Kinsbergen, on 12 February having been appointed temporary schout-bij-nacht, played an important role in the only major naval battle of the war, the Battle of Dogger Bank, as flotilla commander, second in command to Schout-bij-nacht Johan Zoutman. Van Kinsbergen on Admiraal-Generaal escorted a merchant convoy when he by accident encountered a British squadron superior in firepower. The ensuing engagement was inconclusive, though the Dutch convoy arrived at Holland fully intact. Van Kinsbergen was honoured by stadholder William V by being awarded a special Dogger Bank Medal, as the Dutch Republic had no honorary military orders.

William was in need of a popular figurehead to bolster his regime and on 14 August 1781 appointed van Kinsbergen as his adjutant-general and used him as his permanent naval advisor. This way van Kinsbergen soon became the de facto supreme naval commander and also gained a wider political influence, having regular talks with the Orangist leaders on how best to counter the Patriots. On 10 May 1782 he also became a major, commanding a newly raised marine unit. The same year he published general instructions regarding the naval service and a Fundamentals of Naval Tactics, that would be translated into Russian in 1792. In October he commanded a squadron headed for Norway to escort a VOC return fleet; in his absence he was on 10 October appointed a member of the new Secret Council for Naval Affairs.

In 1783, wearied by the endless criticism of Dutch naval policy, he considered returning to the Russian navy but was persuaded by the stadtholder to remain. In 1784 and 1785 he went to the Mediterranean on the Jupiter, partly to deter a possible attack from Venice. At Toulon he received the news that an investigating commission had concluded that he was to blame for the Brest Affair, the failure of the attempt in the summer of 1782 to form a combined Spanish, French and Dutch fleet in the English Channel. In reaction he sent his resignation to William, but again the stadtholder managed to change his admiral's mind. In February 1786 he returned with part of his squadron. On 23 July 1786 he married for the first time, with Hester Hooft, the very wealthy daughter of an Amsterdam burgomaster and widow of schepen George Clifford IV.

In 1787, the relationship with the stadtholder became strained when the latter used a Prussian invasion of Holland to repress the Patriots. Van Kinsbergen's house in Amsterdam was even searched by soldiers for evidence of secret dealings with William's enemies, though nothing more incriminating was found than some sabres and pistols. At that time Van Kinsbergen had already left the Republic however: he was on a honeymoon in Germany, being received in Vienna by Joseph II, Holy Roman Emperor. Again, envoys of Catharina tried to make him re-enter the Russian navy, offering him the rank of vice admiral and the command of the Black Sea Fleet, but after some consideration he refused in March 1788, even though the stadtholder had consented to a change of service in February. On 8 April 1789 he also refused to become Danish commander-in-chief; on 16 December he was appointed vice admiral in the Dutch navy.

In 1790 he commanded an auxiliary squadron, joining the British navy for a possible war with Spain. In 1791 and 1792, Revolutionary France attacked the Republic and Van Kinsbergen stayed on land, writing a number of publications. On 3 March 1793, he became commander-in-chief of the Holland and Zealand fleets and commander of the naval artillery corps, in the summer beating off a French invasion attempt to cross the Hollands Diep. On 11 August 1793 he was appointed lieutenant admiral. In 1794 the allied Rhine defences collapsed and the French could in early 1795 march unopposed over the frozen Dutch Water Line, bringing the Patriots to power.

== Life during the Batavian regime ==
On 17 January 1795 at Scheveningen he took leave from the departing stadtholder, who fled for England, never to return. In the absence of statdholder van Kinbergen was now supreme commander, and took measures to prevent Dutch ships and ports falling into British hands. On 29 January and again on 9 February he bade the States-General to be relieved from his duty. However, they themselves were at this moment being replaced by a new revolutionary regime, instated by the French: the Batavian Republic. On 24 February he was arrested on orders of the Provisional Representatives of the People of Holland, revolutionaries who had appointed themselves as a provisional government.

Soon he was again released, only to be cashiered together with the entire naval officer corps on 27 February. The five provincial admiralties of the old Republic were being centralized, as Van Kinsbergen had advocated for, and all officers were invited to apply again for service in the new navy. Although some urged him to do this, Van Kinsbergen, confused and depressed, simply did not bother. On 26 April his wife died and in June he accepted a Danish offer to become vice-admiral and commander-in-chief. However, the revolutionary regime refused to give him permission to leave the country and in 1796 pressured Denmark to withdraw his appointment, though he nominally stayed in Danish service until 1806.

In 1796 Van Kinsbergen returned to the old house of his deceased parents in Elburg, dedicating his life to philanthropy. He created a naval academy in Elburg and an orphanage in Apeldoorn; in 1799 for his health he moved to an estate near the latter town, Welgelegen, a former property of a deceased younger brother. Gradually the Batavian Republic, in need of popular men to legitimise its power, began to make overtures to van Kinsbergen: in 1797 it was suggested he become supreme commander; in 1801 even a formal offer was made. This failed however because he demanded that all officers be reinstated. In early 1806, Grand Pensionary Rutger Jan Schimmelpenninck, a man well acquainted to him, made a personal and emotional appeal, but van Kinsbergen again refused.

== Service during the Kingdom of Holland ==
However, in the summer of 1806, on orders of Emperor Napoleon I the Kingdom of Holland was created and his brother, the new King Louis Bonaparte, on 16 July appointed Van Kinsbergen member of the Dutch Council of State and First Chamberlain — and these were only the first of a long list of honours bestowed on the old admiral: e.g. on 26 December he was made marshal and on 15 May 1808 marshal of the navy of the Kingdom of Holland and on 4 February 1810, when on French orders all Dutch marshals had to be degraded, he was appointed full admiral. On 4 May 1810 he was made Count of the Dogger Bank. On 11 October 1808 Alexander I of Russia had awarded him the star of the Order of St. Andrew which entailed the Order of St. Alexander Nevsky, the Order of the White Eagle, the Order of St. Anne, first degree, and the Order of St. Stanislaus.

In 1810 though, the Kingdom of Holland was annexed by the French Empire and Van Kinsbergen degraded to a vice admiral in the French Imperial Navy. However, on 18 December 1810 he was made a Count of the Empire and on 2 January 1811 appointed French senator. Van Kinsbergen wrote to Napoleon on 11 January that he was too old to move to Paris — knowing quite well the emperor had not intended him to — and asked that his salary might be redirected to the navy, causing an annoyed Napoleon to react: "Does this proud Dutch sailor think he can use me to dole out his alms?". Meanwhile, Van Kinsbergen continued his charitable works: e.g. in 1811 he donated a fire engine to the municipality of Elburg.

== Service under the Netherlands and death ==
In late 1813, Cossacks liberated the territory of the Northern Netherlands; Van Kinsbergen used his knowledge of Russian to negotiate an armistice between the French forces occupying Het Loo and the Russian troops, preventing its royal palace from being plundered. Also, he raised two regiments of Dutch volunteers to besiege the French garrison holding out in Deventer. On 28 March 1814 he was appointed one of the six hundred electors to approve the new Dutch Constitution. On 12 June 1814, he was appointed by the new sovereign prince, William VI of Orange, titular lieutenant admiral and on 11 July a full lieutenant admiral: in the new United Kingdom of the Netherlands this was to be a purely honorary rank, bestowed for great merit, in the case of van Kinsbergen for his "excellent merits and constant Patriotism". In 1815 he became, on 8 July, Knight Grand Cross of the Order of William.

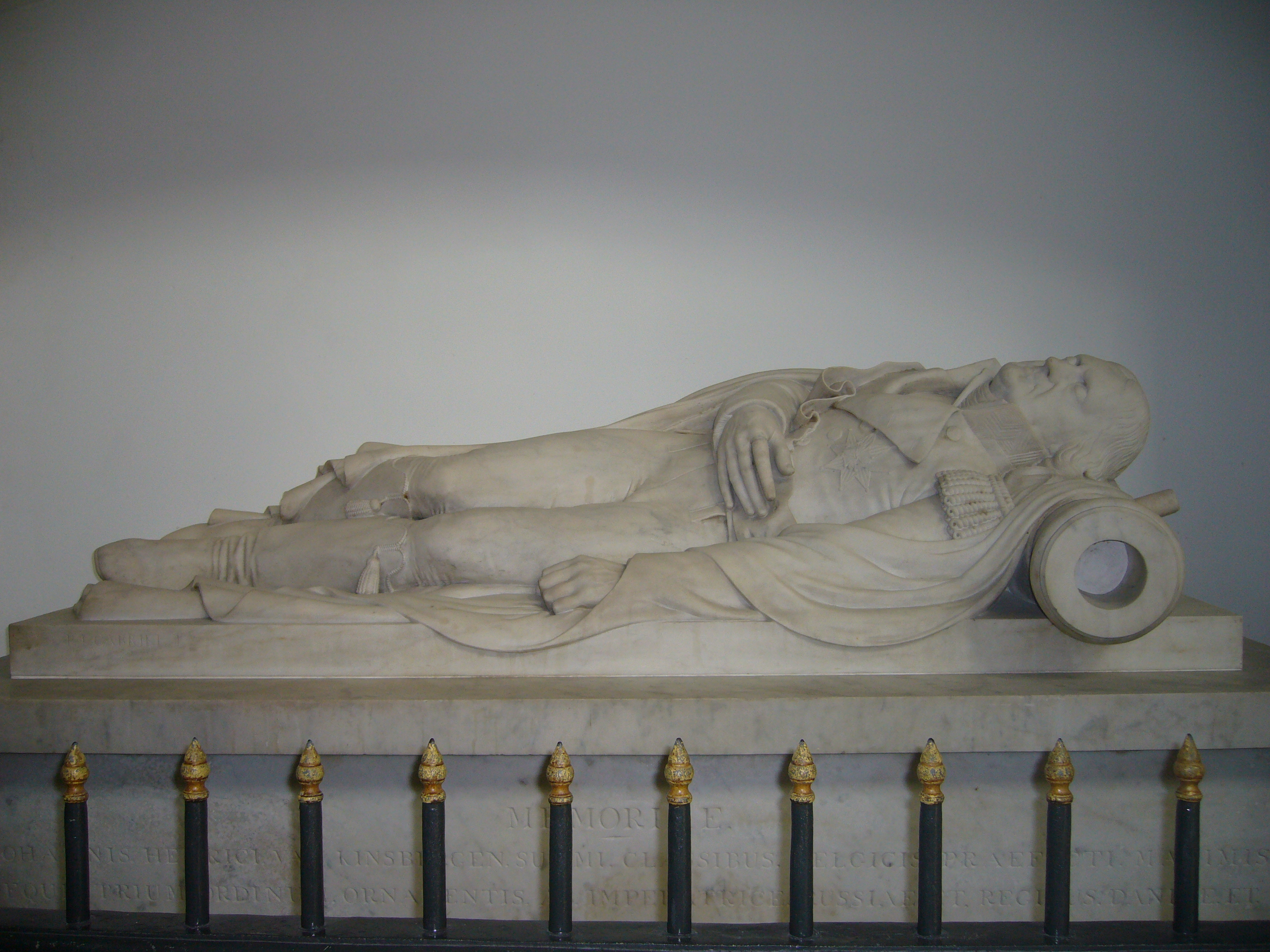
Cenotaph of Van Kinsbergen

In the same year he offered a prize of seven hundred guilder for the best commemorative volume about the events of 1813, won by Johannes van der Palm. Hendrik Tollens won Van Kinsbergen's prize of five hundred guilder for a Dutch national anthem, with "Wien Neêrlands Bloed". In 1817 he also donated marble busts of Christiaan Huygens, Pieter Corneliszoon Hooft, Hugo de Groot, Herman Boerhaave and Peter Paul Rubens to the Royal Netherlands Academy of Arts and Sciences in the Trippenhuis, works by Paulus Joseph Gabriël; another bust by the same, of De Ruyter, was given to the Amsterdam Naval Academy, festively carried by a fleet of boats through the canals. The wealthy merchant Jan Kluppel was so touched by the sight that he ordered also a bust of the modest Van Kinsbergen himself to be sculpted by Gabriël, to be placed below that of De Ruyter.

On 20 November 1816 van Kinsbergen received the royal writ by the new King William I of the Netherlands that he was promoted to jonkheer. He died three years later, on 22 May 1819 shortly after his 84th birthday, at Apeldoorn, from a chronic lung disease, where he was buried on 27 May. In 1821 a marble grave monument was finished by Gabriël in the Nieuwe Kerk in Amsterdam, but this is a cenotaph.

== Honours and awards ==
- Member of the Chapter of the Royal Order of Merit (16 December 1806)
- Knight Grand Cross of the Military William Order (8 July 1815)
- Grand Cross of the Royal Order of Holland (1807)
- Duke of Dogger Bank (4 May 1810)
- Member of the Royal Netherlands Academy of Arts and Sciences (4 May 1808)
- Grand Cross of the Order of St. Andrew (11 October 1808)
- Order of St. Alexander Nevsky
- Order of St. Anne, 1st class
- Order of the White Eagle
- Order of St. Stanislaus
- Order of St. George, 4th class (1773) and 3rd class (1775)
- Hero of the Black Sea

=== Namesakes ===
The Dutch Navy has named a training vessel (launched in 2000) after him, as well as a 1980s Kortenaer-class frigate and an artillery-instruction ship that served from 1939 until 1952. A street has been named after him in every town to which he was related: Amsterdam, Apeldoorn, Elburg and The Hague.

== Literature ==
- R. B. Prud'homme van Reine: Jan Hendrik van Kinsbergen 1735-1819. Admiraal en Filantroop. De Bataafsche Leeuw, Amsterdam, 1990, ISBN 90-6707-237-0, ISBN 978-90-6707-237-3 (Dutch)
- M. C. van Hall: Het Leven en Karakter van den Admiraal Jan Hendrik van Kinsbergen. Johannes Müller, Amsterdam, 1841 (Dutch)
