= Affair of Fielding and Bylandt =

Brief naval engagement off the Isle of Wight on 31 December 1779

Coordinates: 50°14′N 1°35′W

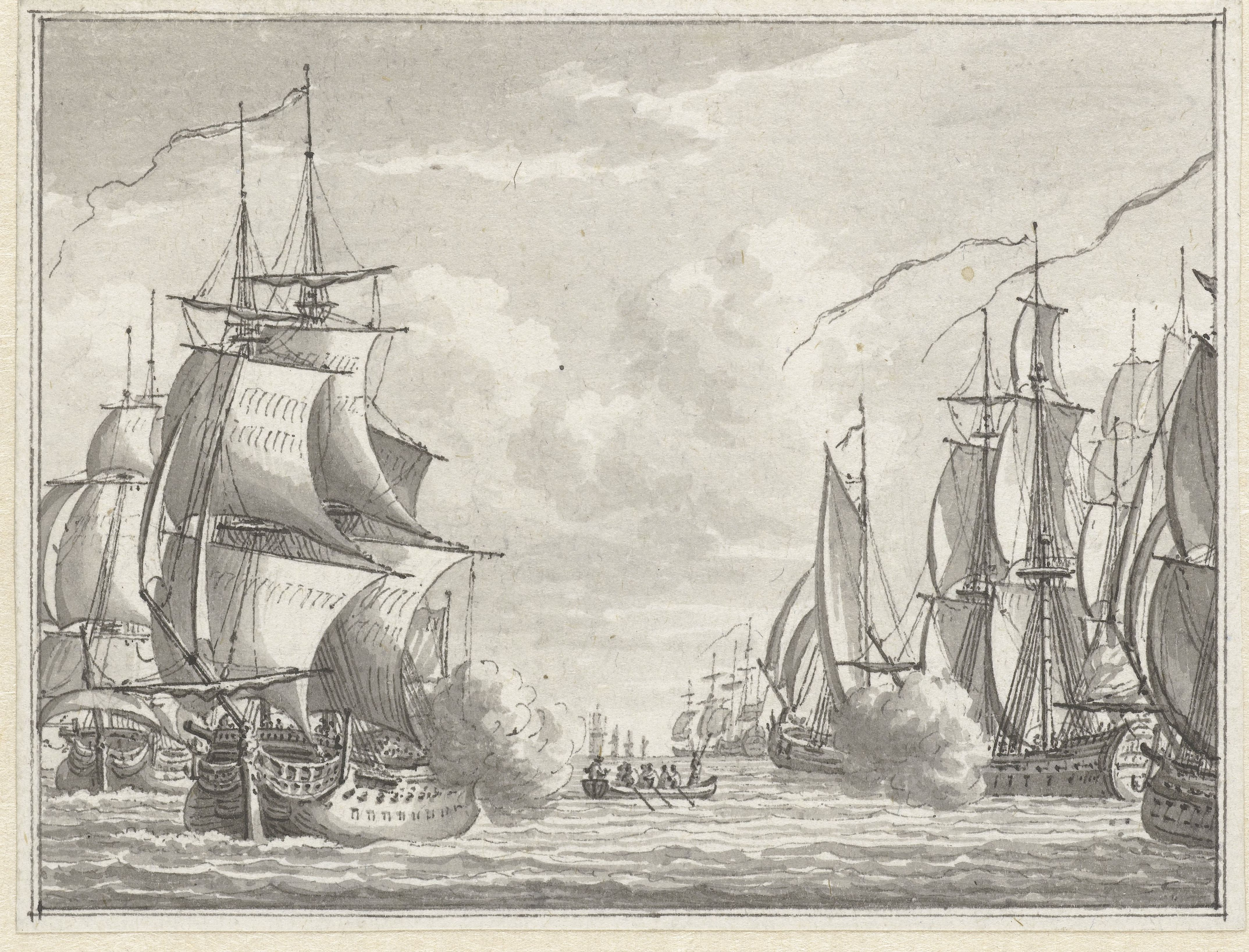
Dutch illustration of the affair

The affair of Fielding and Bylandt was a brief naval engagement off the Isle of Wight on 31 December 1779 between a Royal Navy squadron, commanded by Commodore Charles Fielding, and a squadron of the Dutch States Navy, commanded by Schout-bij-nacht Lodewijk van Bylandt, escorting a Dutch convoy. The Dutch and British were not yet at war, but Fielding wished to inspect the Dutch merchantmen for what they considered contraband destined for France, then engaged in the American Revolutionary War.

Bylandt attempted to avoid an engagement by offering to allow the British to inspect the ships' manifests, but when Fielding insisted on a physical inspection, Bylandt fired a single broadside before striking his colours. Fielding's squadron proceeded to take the Dutch convoy as prizes to Portsmouth, followed by van Bylandt's squadron. The incident worsened already strained Anglo-Dutch relations, and also contributed to the formation of the First League of Armed Neutrality to which the Dutch tried to accede in December 1780. Britain declared war on the Dutch in the same month, initiating the Fourth Anglo-Dutch War.

== Background ==
Though the Dutch and British had been allies ever since the 1688 Glorious Revolution, the former had increasingly become the junior partner in the relationship. The 1667 Treaty of Breda and 1674 Treaty of Westminster, signed between the English and Dutch, stipulated that the former would grand the latter the right to transport non-contraband goods in its ships to countries with which England was at war without them being subject to seizure even if they were owned by subjects of belligerent powers (this was referred to as the principle of "free ship, free goods"). Contraband was narrowly defined in these treaties as "arms and munitions", and naval stores were not included in this definition.

This right became important during wars in which Britain was a participant but the Dutch were neutral, such as the Seven Years' War and American Revolutionary War. It exempted Dutch ships from British inspections and the confiscation of potentially contraband goods in British prize courts, thereby undermining Britain's ability to maintain an effective embargo on its enemies, especially because Dutch shipping at the time still played a major role in European trade. Though Dutch public opinion became more sympathetic to the American Revolution after 1776, stadtholder William V and his autocratic regime were inclined against supporting the Americans.

The Republic's federalism prevented the central government from interfering with the commerce of cities such as Amsterdam, which sold arms and munitions to the Americans. Amsterdam merchants also supplied France with naval stores the French needed for naval construction but were unable to procure from Norway]and the Baltic due to British blockades. The Republic as a neutral power was therefore very useful for the French and their war effort. Britain viewed these developments with disfavour, and lobbied the Dutch government to put an end to them. When British diplomatic overtures went nowhere, the Royal Navy resorted increasingly to seizing what it defined as contraband in Dutch ships, which elicited protests from affected merchants, which were at first ignored by the Dutch government. France proceeded to exert pressure on the Republic to "defend its treaty rights" by selectively imposing economic sanctions on Dutch cities which supported William in his opposition to taking countermeasures against the seizures. This soon convinced those cities to fall in line with Amsterdam and start clamouring for Dutch warships to convoy merchantmen.

The States General of the Netherlands changed its position in November 1779 and ordered William to start offering limited convoy services to Dutch shipping, despite the Dutch navy being weakened through neglect. It only had 20 ships of the line capable of active service, all of which were no match for the larger British navy, which had 137 ships of the line at the time. After much discussion, the States General embarked on a programme of naval construction in 1778. 24 new ships of the line were to be built, but the programme progressed slowly as only the County of Holland paid its share of the cost. None of the new ships were as yet available, which may help explain a certain lack of enthusiasm in the Dutch navy to go to war. Though the Republic did not concede to the British insistence that naval stores were to be considered contraband, the stadtholder prevailed in his policy of excluding such stores from Dutch convoys to minimize friction with Britain.

== Affair ==
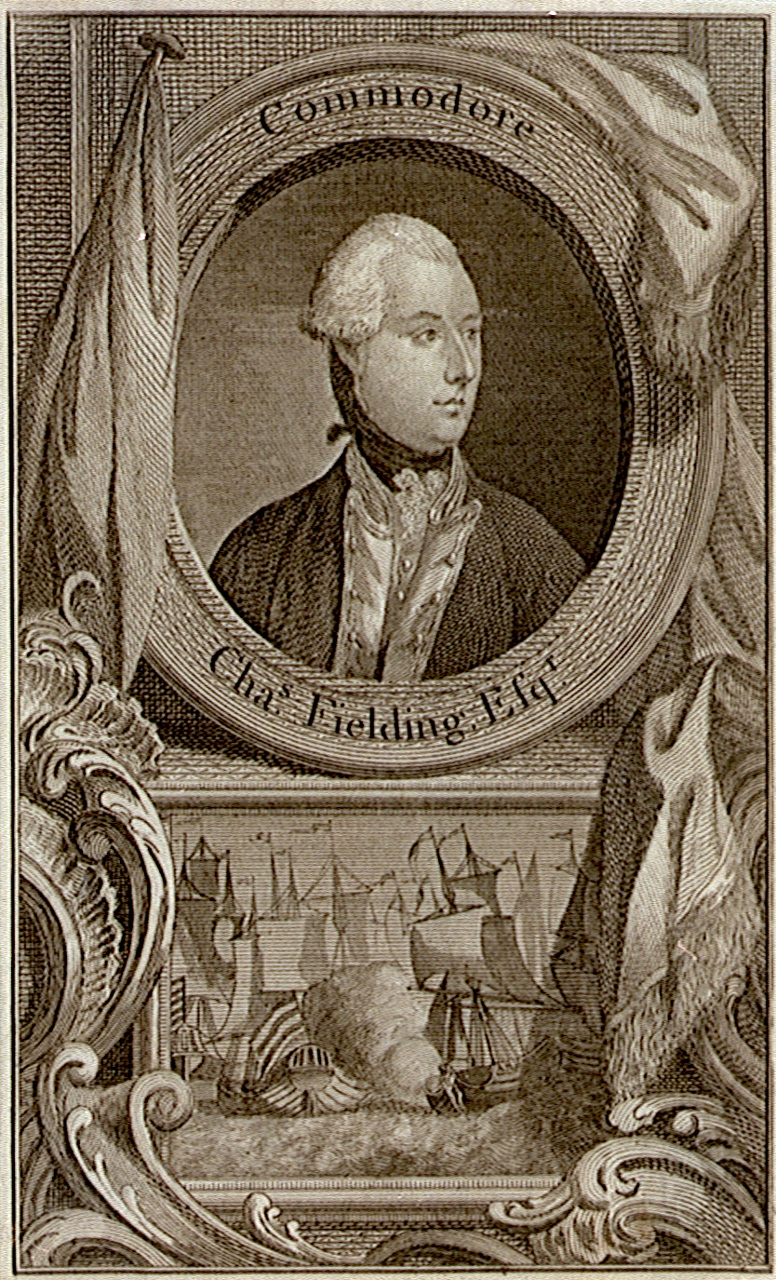
c. 1780 portrait of Fielding

When the first convoys were prepared in December 1779 (one to the West Indies under Schout-bij-nacht Willem Krul, and another to France and the Mediterranean under Schout-bij-nacht Lodewijk van Bylandt), the stadtholder gave written instructions that these should exclude ships that transported naval stores (as he at the time understood that the British defined those as in essence ships' timbers). He also prohibited allowing ships from "nations not recognized by the Republic" (i.e. American ships) to become part of the convoys. Finally, he enjoined van Bylandt to avoid anything that might jeopardize the neutrality of the Republic.

The squadron of Bylandt departed from the Texel on 27 December 1779. It consisted of his flagship, the 54-gun ship of the line Prinses Royal Frederika Sophia Maria, the 40-gun Argo (under Captain Jan Hendrik van Kinsbergen), the 44-gun Zwieten (under Captain Nauman), the 26-gunValk (under Captain Silvester) and the 26-gun Alarm (under Captain Mulder). They escorted 17 Dutch merchantmen. After progressing calmly through the English Channel, the convoy encountered a British squadron on the morning of 30 December. This consisted of the 90-gun HMS Namur, flying the broad pennant of Commodore Charles Fielding, the 74-gun ships HMS Courageux (Captain Thomas Allen), HMS Centaur (Captain J. N. P. Nott), HMS Thunderer (Captain James Bradby) and HMS Valiant (Captain Samuel Goodall), the 60-gun HMS Buffalo (Captain H. Bromedge), the 50-gun HMS Portland (Captain Anthony Hunt), the 32-gun HMS Emerald (Captain Samuel Marshall), the 20-gun ships HMS Seaford (Captain Isaac Prescott) and HMS Camel (Captain Richard Rodney Bligh), the 12-gun HMS Hawk (Captain Richard Murray) and the 8-gun HMS Wolf (Captain M. Cole). (Note: A subsequent prize money notice in the London Gazette does not mention Wolf, but also includes the post ship HMS Daphne, and the cutters HMS Expedition, HMS Sprightly, HMS Nimble, and HMS Flying Fish.)

Courageux hailed the Dutch flagship and asked for a parley to which van Bylandt agreed. Fielding sent a boat with two parlimentaires, one of which was his flag captain, Marshall. Marshall demanded van Bylandt agree to a physical inspection of the Dutch merchantmen by the British. Van Bylandt refused and produced the manifests of the convoy's ships, adding that he was personally satisfied that the convoy did not contain ship's timbers. Marshall then asked whether the ships carried hemp or iron and van Bylandt admitted that they did and that these goods had never been considered contraband. In response, Marshall stated that according to his new orders hemp and iron now constituted contraband. Seeing that Marshall was refusing to budge on his demands, van Bylandt then sent his own flag captain, his nephew, Frederik Sigismond van Bylandt, to Namur to negotiate directly with Fielding, which also failed to lead to an agreement. Fielding stated that he would start searching the Dutch vessels the next morning (as night had now fallen) and Frederik replied that in that case the Dutch would open fire.

During the night, 12 Dutch merchantmen slipped away, and by the next morning the convoy only consisted of the remaining five. Fielding now closed in with Namur and two 74s but was blocked by van Bylandt with Prinses Royal Frederika Sophia Maria, Argo and the frigate Alarm (the other two Dutch ships were out of reach). Namur sent a launch to one of the Dutch merchantmen and Prinses Royal Frederika Sophia Maria fired two warning shots across its bow to make it veer away. Accounts of what happened next differ; according to Bylandt and his captains, the three British ships immediately replied with a broadside, to which the Dutch ships replied with one broadside of their own. According to Fielding, he fired a single shot, which was answered by a Dutch broadside, to which the British replied with broadsides of their own.

After this exchange of fire, van Bylandt immediately struck his colours and signalled the other Dutch ships to do the same, which was prohibited by Dutch standing orders. It transpired at van Bylandt's court-martial that he had given sealed orders to his captains before departing from the Texel that they were to strike when he gave a designated signal. He later explained that he had written the orders as he foresaw resistance to be useless, and decided to offer only token resistance that was just enough to "satisfy honour" but restrained his captains from undue displays of aggressiveness. The British interpreted the striking of the colours as it was intended: to break off the fight and not as an actual surrender.

Making no attempt to board the Dutch warships, Fielding proceeded with his inspection of the five merchantmen and duly seized them when he found bales of hemp stashed in their holds. He then sent a message to van Bylandt allowing him to rehoist his colours and proceed on his way. Van Bylandt replied that he would stay with the merchantmen. Fielding then demanded that the Dutch warships salute the British under the terms of previous Anglo-Dutch treaties, with which van Bylandt complied; Dutch public opinion later held it against him. The British then sailed with their prizes to Portsmouth, followed into port by van Bylandt, who sent a complaint to the Dutch ambassador in Britain, Count van Welderen, as soon as he arrived.

== Aftermath ==
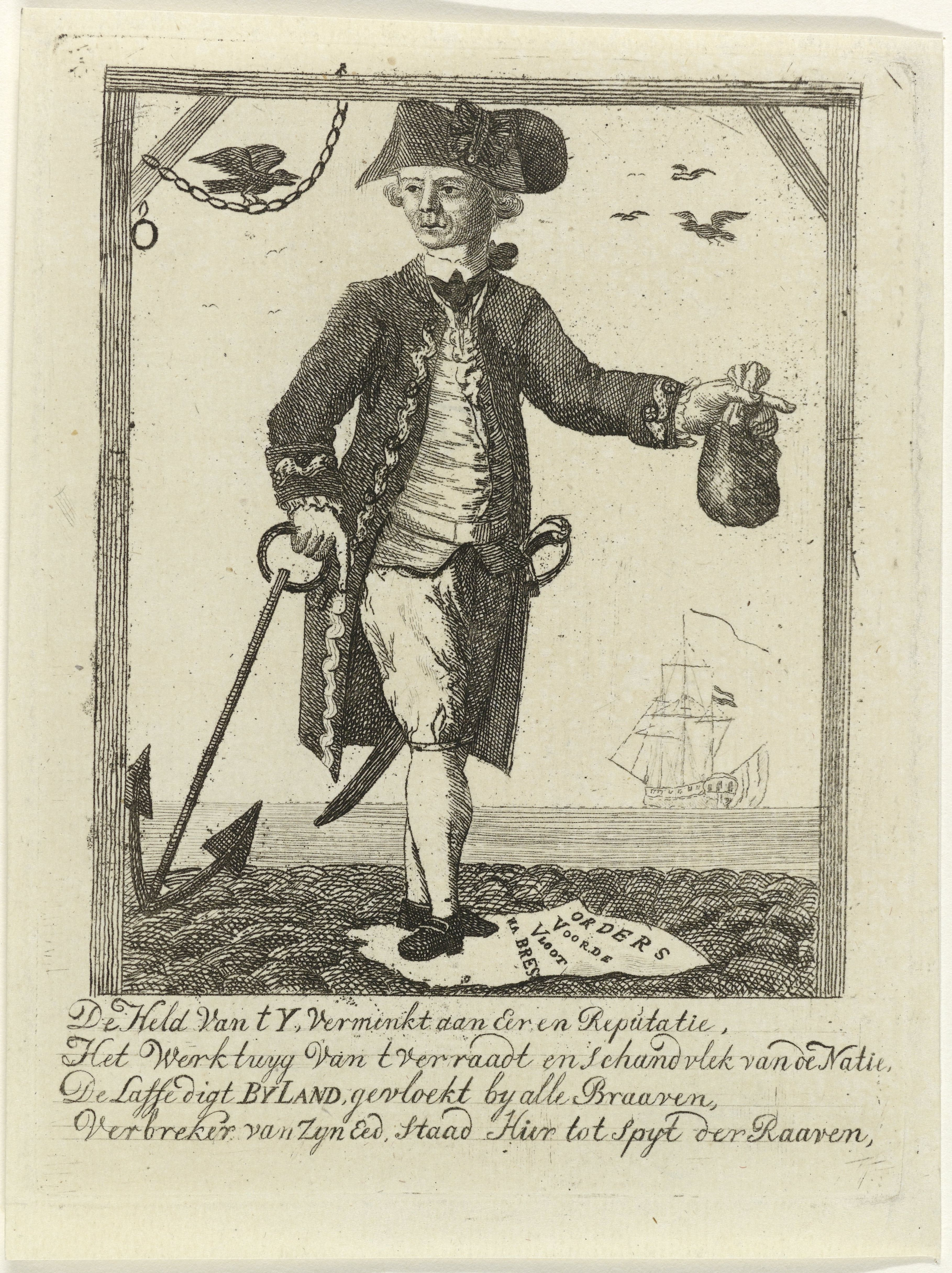
Van Bylandt depicted in a caricature during the 1782 Brest Affair

Dutch public opinion was incensed, both by the inspection and by what they considered Bylandt's pusillanimity that in the view of many amounted to cowardice, if not treason. Van Bylandt demanded a court-martial to clear his name, and a blue-ribbon panel consisting of seven admirals soon acquitted him of all charges. As a consequence of the ongoing political unrest, the stadtholder ceased his resistance to unlimited convoys; the Dutch henceforth attempted to defend their full treaty rights, to the satisfaction of France, which suspended its economic sanctions. In response, in April 1780 Britain abrogated the Commercial Treaty of 1668 and declared that it would henceforth treat the Dutch like any other neutral nation in the conflict, and refrain from continuing to grant them the "free ship, free goods" rights.

Catherine the Great, shocked by the incident and a similar one involving Spanish and Russian ships, issued a manifesto in which she demanded the belligerents respect the "free ship, free goods" policy. France and Spain were quick to comply but the British demurred, knowing the declaration was aimed at them. Catherine entered into negotiations with other neutral powers, including Holland, to form the First League of Armed Neutrality. The Republic saw an opportunity to prevent further British seizures of Dutch shipping without having to go war against Britain, but overplayed their hand by asking for a guarantee of Dutch colonies by the League's other members, which Catherine refused to grant. Eventually, the Dutch dropped this demand and joined the League in December 1780. However, Britain declared war on the Dutch in the same month, citing their secret support for the Americans, which provided the League's other members an excuse to withhold armed assistance to the Republic.

== Notes and citations ==
Notes

Citations

== Sources ==
- Beatson, Robert (1804). Naval and Military Memoirs of Great Britain, from 1727 to 1783. Vol. 6. Longman, Hurst, Rees and Orme.
- Edler, F. (2001; repr. 1911 ed.) The Dutch Republic and The American Revolution. University Press of the Pacific, ISBN 0-89875-269-8
- Fiske, J. (1919) The American Revolution
- (in Dutch) Jonge, J.C. de (1869) Geschiedenis van het Nederlandsche Zeewezen (third edition)
