= Dutch–Moroccan War (1775–1777) =

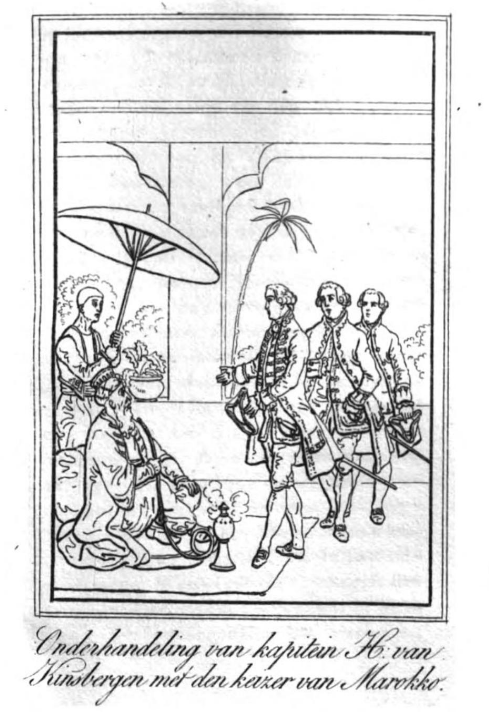
- Negotiations of JH van Kinsbergen with the Emperor of Morocco (19th-century illustration)
Date	1 January 1775 (Note: Morocco declared war on 30 October 1774 and their declaration was received on 3 November 1774. However, since the declaration was officially accepted on 1 January 1775, some sources will list 1774 as the first year of the war.) – 29 June 1777
Location	North Atlantic Ocean, coast of Morocco
Result	Dutch victory

Belligerents
Sultanate of Morocco	Dutch Republic

Commanders and leaders
(Morocco) Mohammed III (Morocco) Ali Peres † (Morocco) Taibi Velalou †	(Dutch Republic) Kinsbergen (Dutch Republic) Quirijn Dabenis (Dutch Republic) Andries Hartsinck (Dutch Republic) Salomon Dedel (Dutch Republic) Daniel Pichot (Dutch Republic) Lodewijk van Bylandt (Dutch Republic) Jan Bentinck

Strength
Raiding force: 2 frigates, 3-4 xebecs, 2 galleys Other forces: 4 galiots 1 frigate Other Moroccan pirates	First half of 1775: 8 warships Second half of 1775, and after: Patrolling and escorting ships: 8 frigates 1 ship of the line Blockading Moroccan ports and coast: 8–12 warships

Casualties and losses
2 frigates destroyed 50 cannons lost 3 xebecs destroyed 1 galiot severely damaged 2 galleys destroyed	2 merchant ships captured and shipwrecked 1 merchant ship captured (later recovered)

The Dutch-Moroccan War (1775–1777), also known as the Moroccan War (1775–1777), was initiated when Moroccan Sultan Mohammed III declared war on the Dutch Republic in response to the Dutch's lack of proper tribute and an accidental attack on a Moroccan ship. Under the leadership of Captains Salomon Dedel and Jan Hendrik van Kinsbergen, the Dutch gained the upper hand through effective blockades of Moroccan ports, well-organized patrols against Moroccan ships, and the destruction of the Sultan's two finest frigates. Mohammed III ultimately asked the States General for peace. As part of the treaty, all Dutch slaves held in Moroccan captivity were released without ransom, and the Dutch were no longer required to give tribute.

== Background ==
On September 14, 1774, the Dutch ship Princess Royal Frederica Sophia Wilhelmina and Captain Quirijn Dabenis reached the shores of the bay near Larache where, due to the lack of a suitable anchoring spot, the ship had to wait for two days before it could safely drop anchor. The purpose of this voyage was to deliver a gift to Sultan Mohammed III as a token of their strong friendship and enduring alliance. The gift consisted of two chests of porcelain, a saber, a powder horn, two elegant golden watches, a ring, two Dutch rugs, and a selection of coffee and tea. This was intended to serve as both a present and a reminder of the positive diplomatic relations between the two nations. Dabenis immediately set sail after unloading the gifts to avoid any further formalities and invitations that could potentially incur additional expenses for the Dutch Republic. Rossignol, the envoy tasked with delivering the gifts to the Sultan, decided to wait, hoping for instructions from the States General.

The governor of Larache spotted Rossignol and informed the Sultan about the pending gift. The Sultan, residing in Meknes, sent a formal escort of three officers and twenty horses to bring Rossignol and the gifts to him. On October 3, Rossignol was escorted from Larache and arrived in Meknes on October 7. There, he received word that the Sultan had left a few days earlier to visit a military camp in the mountains near Fez. Rossignol finally reached Fez on October 14 and was granted an audience with the Sultan on October 17. The Sultan was dissatisfied with the presents and instructed Rossignol to return them. Rossignol argued that this would be considered an insult to the Secretary of State and could potentially provoke a war. Rossignol departed from Fez on October 19 October, taking with him the gifts and a letter from the Sultan addressed to the States General.

On November 1, Rossignol received two letters authored by Samuel Sumbel, the Sultan's right-hand man. The first letter, signed by the Sultan himself, formally declared war on the Dutch Republic. The second letter explained that this declaration of war stemmed primarily from an incident wherein Dutch ships attacked a Moroccan vessel, mistaking it for an Algerian one. Rossignol was surprised that Morocco declared war since they had just started a war with Spain and tensions were rising with the Regency of Algiers; nevertheless, he dispatched both letters to the States General, who accepted the declaration of war on January 1, 1775 and sought to secure a decisive Moroccan defeat.

== War ==
The States General wasted no time in taking action. Captain Dabenis, who was stationed in the Strait of Gibraltar with eight warships, received orders to blockade Moroccan ports, preventing any Moroccan pirates from seizing Dutch ships. The blockade proved effective, as only one small engagement took place near the coast of Tanger, in which a Dutch ship chased a Moroccan ship until it stranded and was severely damaged. Over approximately six months, Dabenis safely escorted around 100 Dutch merchant vessels across the Strait of Gibraltar. As a result of a lack of Moroccan pirate activity, his fleet was reduced to eight frigates and one ship of the line. In 1775, Captain Dabenis was replaced by Flag Officer Hartsinck, who was succeeded in turn (after the brief interim appointment of Lodewijk van Bylandt) by Daniel Pichot in 1776. A blockade of the Moroccan coast and ports was initiated by Bylandt, Picker, and Kinsbergen, who commanded a force consisting of eight to twelve warships.

During these events, Rossignol remained at his post, and Dutch traders in Morocco were not subjected to capture. Instead, they were allowed to operate freely in the country and received official passports from the Sultan to facilitate their trading activities, which contributed significantly to Morocco's economy. The Dutch Republic likewise benefitted from this wartime trade and refrained from interfering with the traders. Numerous encounters occurred along the Moroccan coast, including an incident on June 10, 1776, off the coast of Larache where a Dutch frigate mistakenly attacked an Algerian ship. In spite of the blockade's efficacy, the Moroccan fleet itself had declined to engage the Dutch and thus remained largely intact. Confident in his strength, the Sultan offered peace in exchange for an annual tribute of thirty thousand piastres. The Dutch treated this offer as an insult and resolved to force the Sultan into a more favorable peace deal.

In June 1776, the Sultan ordered Ali Perez to engage the Dutch fleet. Still loath to risk disaster but compelled by the Sultan's orders, the commander and his subordinates deployed four xebecs from Tangier or Tétouan and two eighty-man galleys from Beffi Bay (southeast of Tétouan) with the goal of inflicting maximal damage to Dutch trade. Van Bylandt responded with a force of four warships that intercepted and grievously damaged the two galleys in Beffi Bay, which caused the Moroccan navy to retreat to port for over a month. Following this lull, Moroccan warships again ran the blockade, successfully capturing the Dutch cargo ship Maria Catharina and its 35 crewmen in the month of August. Their success was limited, however, as for their part the Dutch managed to intercept and greatly damage a Moroccan xebec.

The decisive engagement of the war came in December that same year, when the Mars of Captain Salomon Dedel and the Venus of captain Wolter Jan Bentick intercepted two Moroccan frigates and a xebec as they were attempting to escort a pair of captured Dutch merchant vessels to Larache. The Dutch began the engagement by trying to recapture the merchant vessels but they, having been re-crewed by Moroccan sailors, escaped by beaching themselves, ultimately destroying both vessels and much of their cargo. The three Moroccan warships eluded the Dutch, but it their haste they all catastrophically shipwrecked; Taibi Velalou near Larache and, later, Ali Perez and the xebec at the entrance of Marmora. This was a substantial defeat for the Sultan. The loss of his best ships and their irreplaceable cannons was a significant blow, effectively crippling his navy. These losses and the blockade ultimately forced the Sultan to sue for peace. Van Kinsbergen was dispatched with two frigates to negotiate a peace agreement with the Sultan. As part of the accord, 58–75 Dutch slaves were liberated without ransom, and the Dutch no longer needed to give tribute to the Sultan. These negotiations were jeopardized the following day when, unaware of the treaty, two Dutch frigates pursued four Moroccan galiots near Arzilla, causing significant damage to one of them despite their flying a white flag. The States General issued an apology for the incident on July 4, and in response, the Sultan ratified the peace agreement with Admiral Picot, expressing his desire for friendship and the restoration of peaceful relations between the two nations.

== Aftermath ==
In the Dutch Republic, both the populace and the States General were happy with the peace, especially the traders. This conflict is often considered the most significant war between the Dutch and the Moroccans, yet it remains largely overlooked and rarely discussed. After the war, diplomatic relations between the involved parties remained strong. Dutch traders actively engaged in commerce along the Moroccan coastline, benefiting from a generous grant of liberty to trade with all ships and access Moroccan ports. The Sultan went on to forge peaceful relations with several other nations, including Denmark-Norway, Sweden, and the United States.

== Sources ==
- Veenendaal, A.J (1975). Matthijs Sloot : een zeeman uit de achttiende eeuw, 1719–1779 (in Dutch). Nijhoff. ISBN 9024717981.
- Waterreus, J. (1865). Geschiedenis der Noordelijke Nederlanden (in Dutch). Arkesteyn.
- Dewald, H.P. (1856). Chronologisch handboek bij de beoefening der Ned. geschiedenis Volume 1 (in Dutch).
- Vrolijk, Arnoud; van Leeuwen, Richard (2013). Arabic Studies in the Netherlands A Short History in Portraits, 1580–1950 (E-book ed.). Brill. ISBN 9789004266339.
- Jonge, Johannes Cornelis; Jakob Jonge, Jan Karel (1861). Geschiedenis van het Nederlandsche zeewezen Dl. 4 (in Dutch). KB, Nationale Bibliotheek van Nederland: Kruseman.
- Bruijn, Jaap R (2017). The Dutch Navy of the Seventeenth and Eighteenth Centuries (E book ed.). Liverpool University Press. ISBN 9781786948908.
- Blok, P.J.; Molhuysen, P.C. (1918). Nieuw Nederlandsch biografisch woordenboek. Deel 4 (in Dutch).
- Wilkes, John (1819). Encyclopaedia Londinensis Volume 16.
- Zuidhoek, Arne (2022). The Pirate Encyclopedia The Pirate's Way (E-book ed.). Brill. ISBN 9789004515673.
- Mollema, J.C. (1939). Geschiedenis van Nederland ter zee (in Dutch). Uitgeversmaatschappij Joost van den Vondel.
- van der Pyl, R.; Bensdorp, J. C. (1816). Korte beschrijving der staten van Barbarije, Marokko, Algiers, Tunis en Fezzan benevens een naauwkeurig verhaal van de roemrijke overwinning, door de gecombineerde Britsche en Nederlandische vloten ... onlangs voor Algiers behaald (in Dutch). KB, Nationale Bibliotheek van Nederland (original from Universiteitsbibliotheek Vrije Universiteit): Blussé.
- van der Bijl, Yvonne (2013). Marokko (in Dutch) (E-book ed.). Elmar B.V., Uitgeverij. ISBN 9789038920801.
