= Raid on Sumatra =

1781 campaign in the Fourth Anglo-Dutch War

- Part of the Fourth Anglo-Dutch War
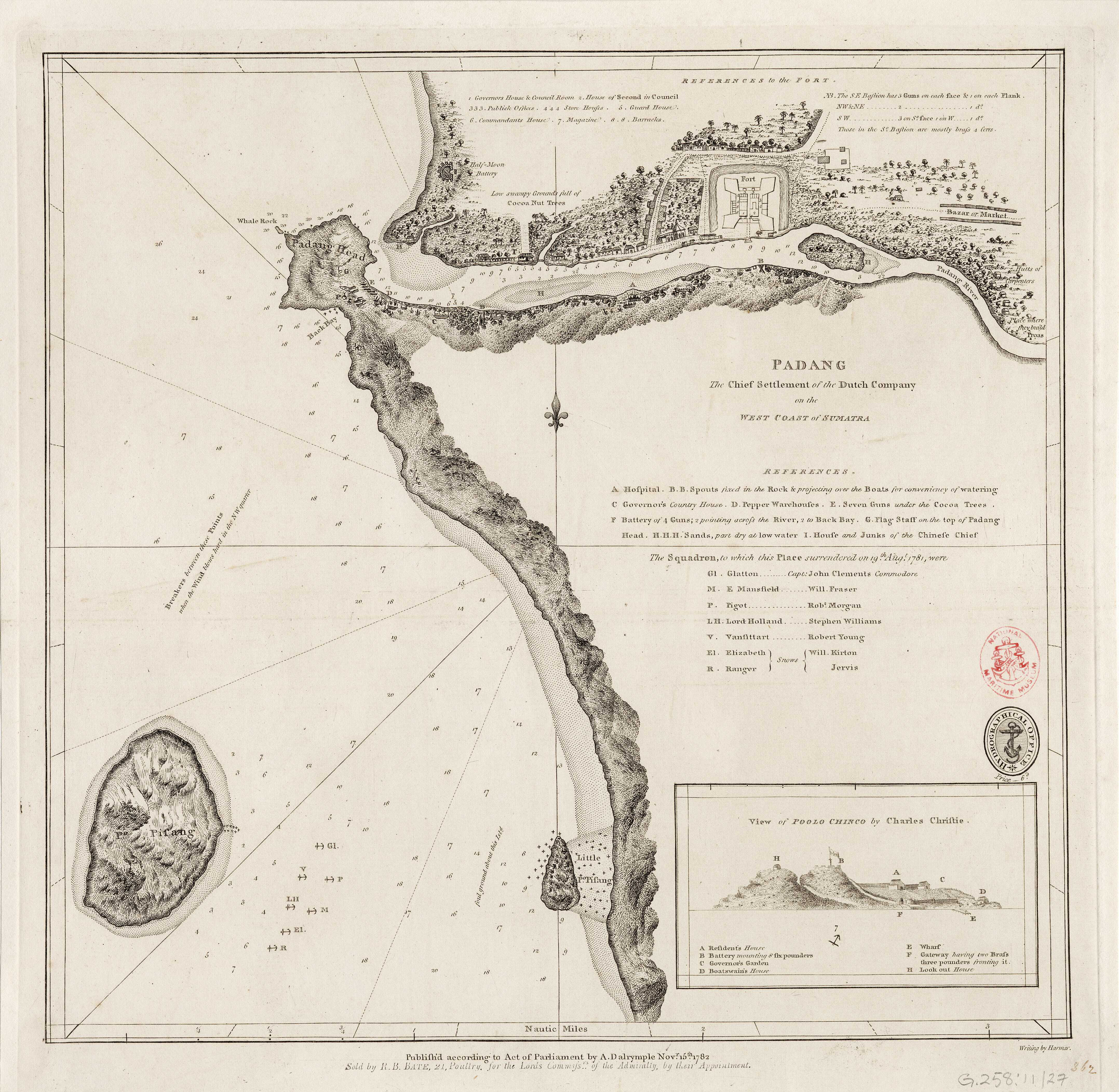
- Admiralty Chart of Dutch Padang on west coast of Sumatra. Inset shows Poolo Chinco. Both surrendered to the British on 18 August 1781
Date	4 – 18 August 1781
Location	Padang, Sumatra
Result	British victory

Belligerents
British East India Company	Dutch East India Company

Commanders and leaders
Henry Botham	Jacob van Heemskerk (surrendered)

Strength
6 ships 100 troops	2 fortifications 800 troops

Casualties and losses
None	All forts, stores and vessels captured

The raid on Sumatra took place during the Fourth Anglo-Dutch War in August 1781. A fleet of the British East India Company set forth to capture the Dutch settlements on Sumatra including Padang. The raid which was more a bluff, was highly successful and netted much profit for the East India Company; in addition the raid also compelled the Dutch to give trading rights to the British after war.

== Background ==
In December 1780 Britain declared war on the Dutch Republic, citing as one of the reasons Dutch trafficking in arms in support of the French and American rebels. On the Indian subcontinent British forces and the East India Company mobilised to gain control over Dutch possessions in India and Ceylon.

In August, word of the war reached Sumatra, where both the Dutch East India Company (VOC) and the British East India Company had trading outposts. The directors of the British company at Fort Marlborough at Bencoolen located on West Sumatra received instructions from Bombay to destroy all of the Dutch outposts on the west coast of Sumatra. Luckily for the directors a fleet of five East India men arrived having traded with China, and the directors seized the opportunity for action. Henry Botham, one of the directors, commandeered the fleet, which was led by Captain John Clements who had with them over 100 company soldiers.

== Raid ==
On 4 August, the fleet sailed to Padang; the snow Elizabeth commanded by William Kerton joined the expedition soon after they had left; Kerton knew the Sumatran coast better than anyone, especially the Dutch trading ports and was to be lead pilot. Elizabeth picked up a number of Minangkabau people which would be vital for a successful trading partnership if the raid was successful.

The first encounter was the Dutch outstation of Cingkuak island. After a brief bombardment and summons of surrender, the outpost was swiftly captured. The snow Elizabeth was left there to form a line of communication with Fort Marlborough - the rest of the expedition then sailed on to Padang with Kerton sailing on as pilot in the Indiaman Glatton.

On the 16 August the small fleet arrived before Padang, Botham went on shore under a flag of truce and summoned the Dutch VOC chief resident Jacob van Heemskerk, to surrender the fort, the town of Padang and all factories on the West coast of Sumatra. Van Heemskerk had some 500 men and natives at his disposal along with a significant number of guns. Botham deceived him into thinking that he had a large force at hand and that more vessels and troops were on their way.

Two days later after much consulting with his captains, van Heemskerk fearing he was about to be overwhelmed and with no support, surrendered all of the west coast outposts without a fight. This included including the large factory of Barus further north, particularly important for trading with the Minangkabau. van Heemskerk was totally unaware that Botham's force was relatively weak, until after the surrender document had been signed.

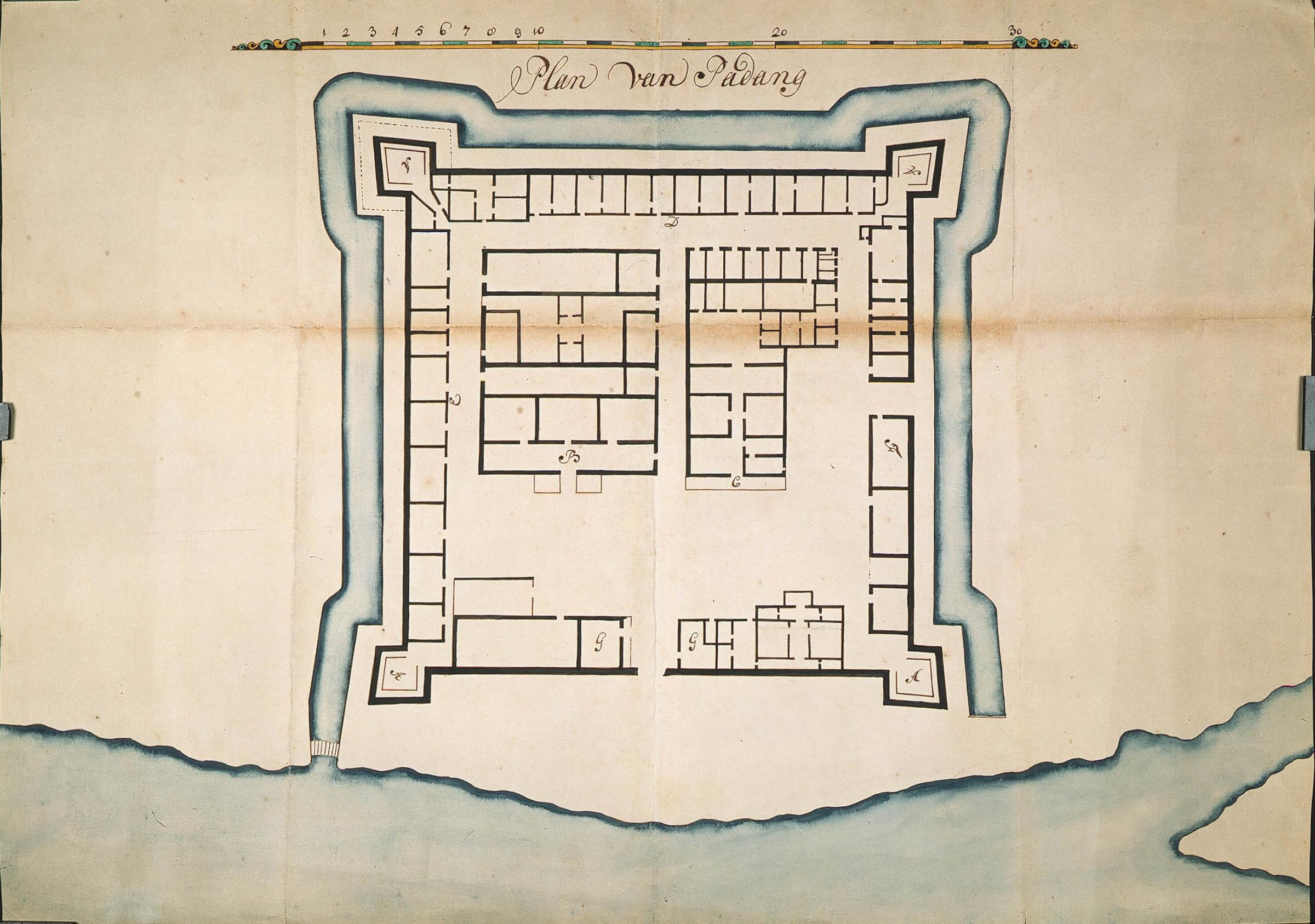
Map of the Dutch fortifications of Padang

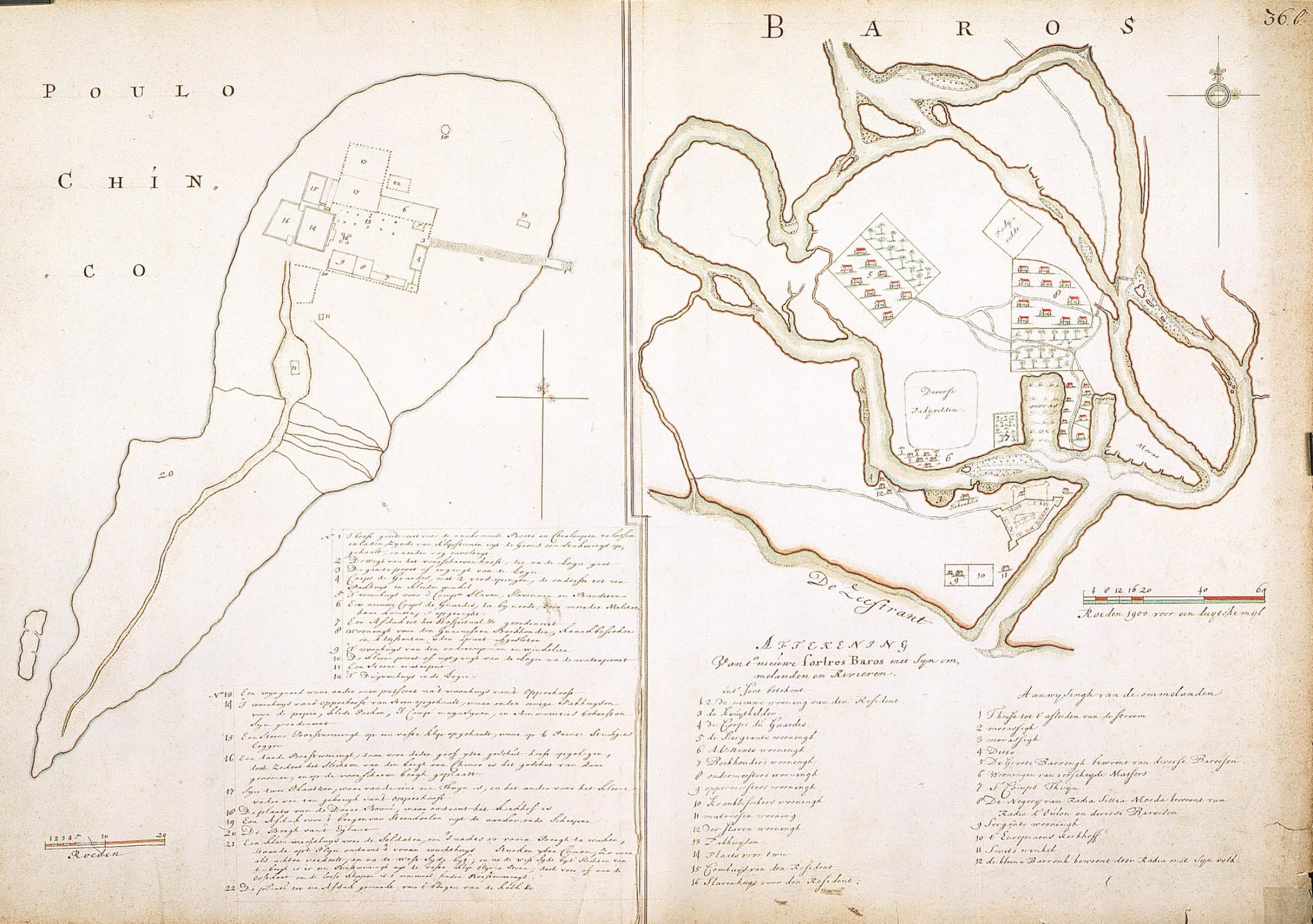
Maps of Dutch bases at Pulau Cingkuak and Baros

== Aftermath ==
The British consolidated their hold on Padang, and sent a further Indiaman Lord North to assist with the administration. The expedition was a huge success for the company - the seizure of the Dutch factories as a whole netted the British some 500,000 florins in goods and money.

The loss of Padang was a huge blow to the Dutch, who were unaware of its fall until the following year. The fortress at Padang remained in British hands till the end of the war, when in May 1784, following the Treaty of Paris the same year, the town was to be returned to VOC control. In July 1785 it was eventually handed over, but not before the fortress had been destroyed. As a result of the raid and for Dutch control to return, the British gained the right of free trade with part of the Dutch East Indies, which had been a major war aim for British merchants.

The war proved a disaster for the Netherlands, particularly economically. It also proved to be confirmation of the weakening of Dutch power in the eighteenth century.
