= Lodewijk van Bylandt =

Dutch States Navy officer (1718–1793

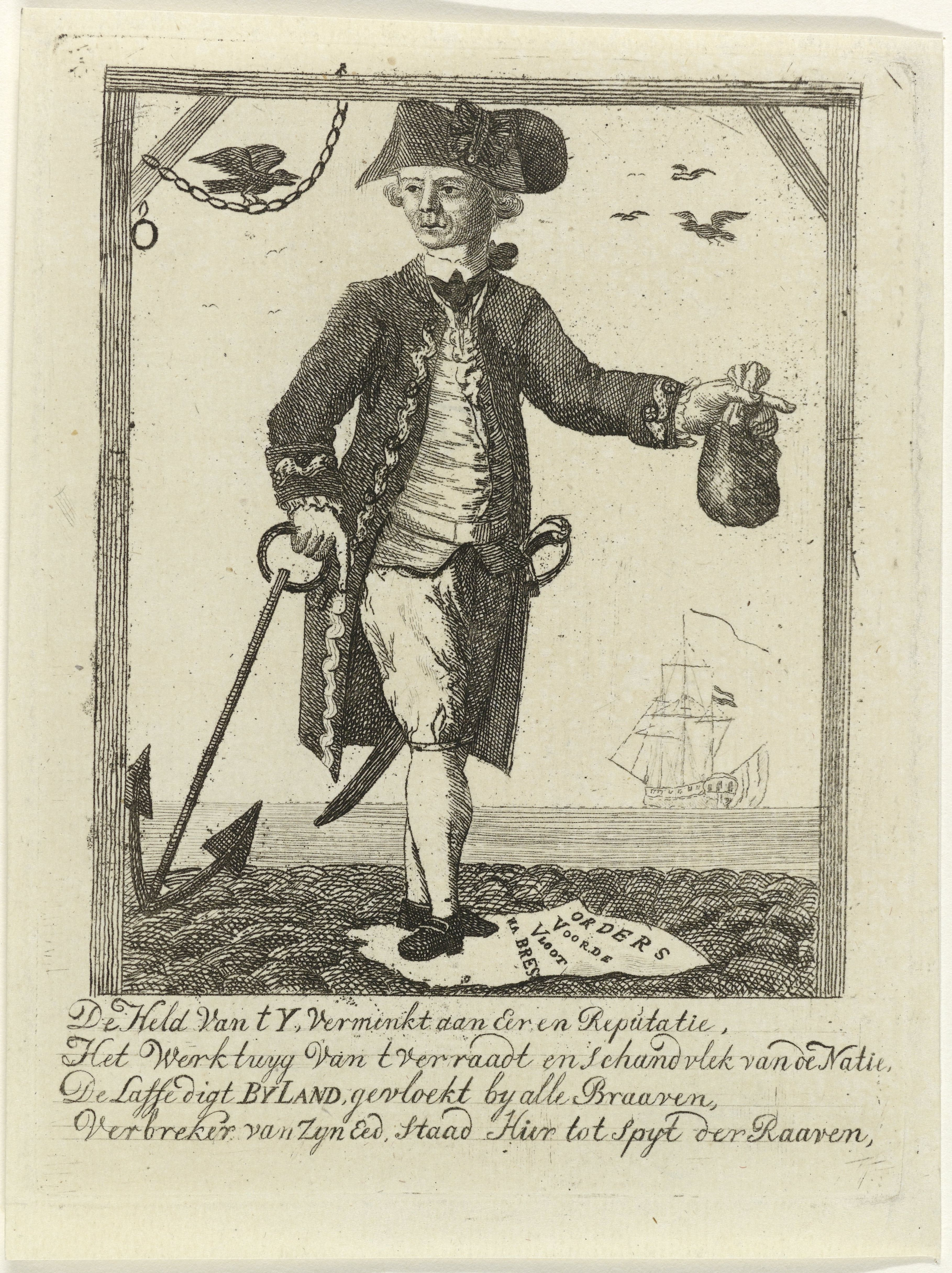
- 1782 caricature of van Bylandt mocking his role in the Brest Affair
- Born: 1718; Dutch Republic
- Died: 28 December 1793 (aged 74–75) Dutch Republic
- Allegiance: Dutch Republic
- Branch: Dutch States Navy
- Service years: 1736–1793
- Rank: Lieutenant admiral
- Commands: West Stellingwerff; Thetis
- Conflicts: Dutch-Moroccan War (1775-1777); American Revolutionary War; Affair of Fielding and Bylandt; Fourth Anglo-Dutch War

Lieutenant-Admiral Lodewijk Count van Bylandt (1718 – 28 December 1793) was a Dutch States Navy officer. He gained a certain notoriety in the affair of Fielding and Bylandt of 1779 and even more in consequence of the refusal of the Dutch navy to put out to sea to combine with the French fleet in Brest in 1783, during the Fourth Anglo-Dutch War, for which refusal many held him responsible. He was court-martialed and exonerated in the first case, and in the second case an inquiry into his conduct was long delayed and eventually quietly abandoned after stadtholder William V had prevailed against the Patriots in 1787. This made his promotion to lieutenant admiral (the highest rank in the Dutch navy, as that of general admiral could only be held by the stadtholder) possible. He died in office as inspector general and commander of the naval artillery corps.

== Family life ==
Van Bylandt was the son of Ludwig Roeleman, Imperial Count of Bylandt-Halt (a cadet branch of the House of Bylandt), a Prussian high official, and Christina Maria Louisa Freiin (baroness) von Heyden - Broeck. He never married. He was a relative of several other high officers in the army and navy of the Dutch Republic and Kingdom of the Netherlands, among whom Willem Frederik van Bylandt, who commanded a brigade at the Battle of Waterloo.

== Career ==
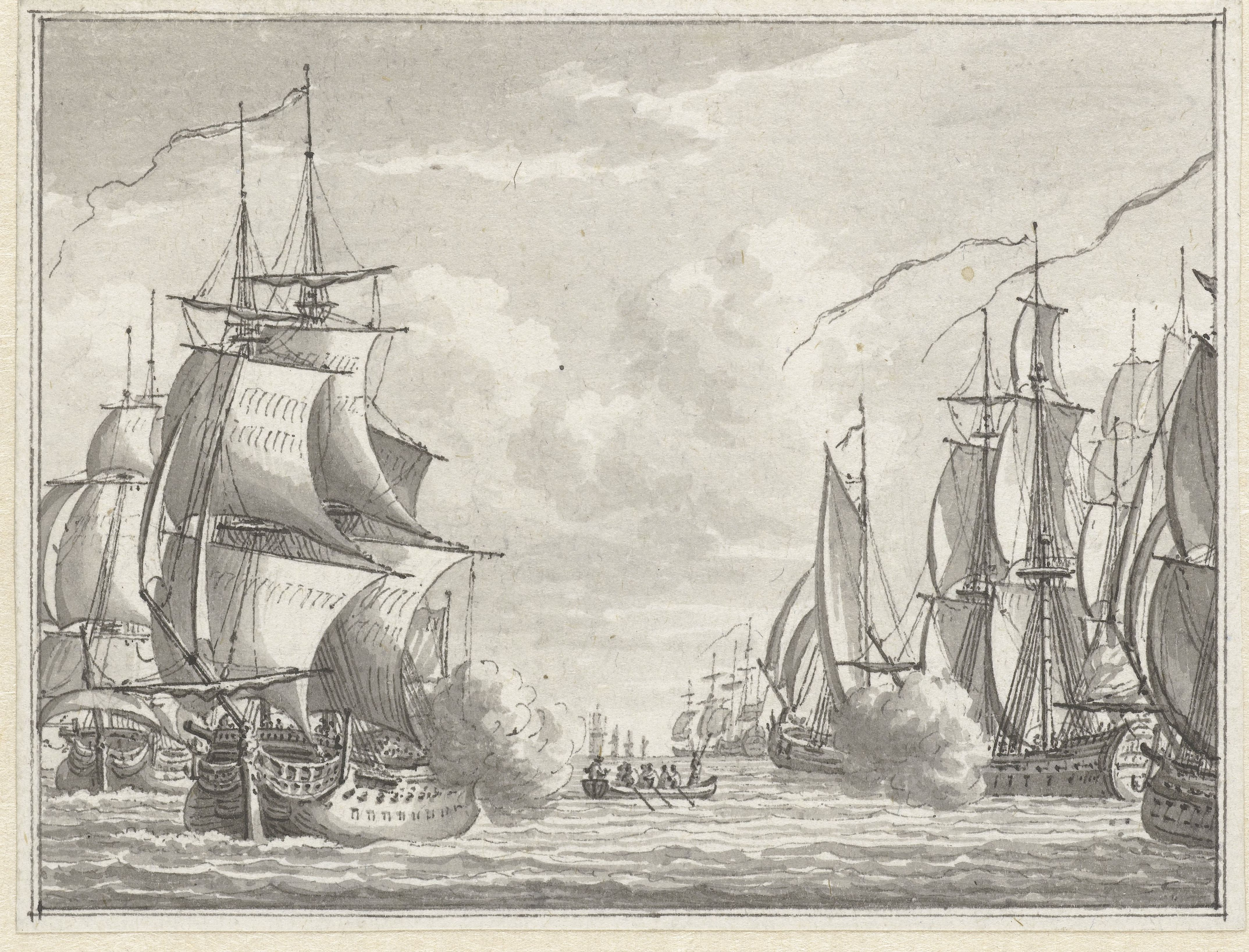
Dutch illustration of the affair of Fielding and Bylandt

Van Bylandt entered the Dutch navy as an adelborst (midshipman) in 1736 in which year he sailed on a cruise to Curaçao. He attained the rank of captain at sea in 1747. In 1756 he was captain of West Stellingwerff and in 1768 of Thetis with which he took part in expeditions against the Barbary corsairs in those years. In 1775 Van Bylandt was acting-commander of a Dutch naval expedition (at the rank of schout-bij-nacht) against Morocco. This expedition was successful in its object to force Sultan Mohammed ben Abdallah to sue for peace, and give the Dutch victory in their war with Morocco. During the American Revolutionary War, a squadron under van Bylandt was sent to the West Indies counter the activities of British privateers targeting Dutch merchantmen transporting what Britain defined as contraband. He remained there a year and was successful in keeping the privateers at bay.

In December 1779, a Dutch merchant convoy, escorted by five warships under van Bylandt, departed from the Texel and was intercepted by a far stronger British squadron near the Isle of Wight on 30 December 1779. This led to the affair of Fielding and Bylandt in which Bylandt struck his colors after firing just one broadside. This humiliation caused a furore in the Dutch Republic in which the stadtholder was also attacked. Van Bylandt demanded a special court-martial to clear his name of accusations of cowardice and treason, and he was acquitted.

After the affair, Anglo-Dutch relations steadily deteriorated and Britain declared war on the Dutch in December 1780. A British force under Admiral George Rodney soon captured Sint Eustatius. According to his biographer Molhuysen, Van Bylandt was also sent to the area and he successfully organized the defense of Curaçao, which remained in Dutch hands. However, other sources, notably Dirks, tell us that Bylandt was never directly involved in the defense of Curaçao, but only detached a ship of the squadron with which he was staying in Lisbon at the time for that purpose.

After his return to the Netherlands in 1781 he was promoted to vice admiral and ordered to contest the British blockade of the Dutch coast. He found the state of the Dutch fleet so deplorable, however, that nothing came of this. As the stadtholder resisted a formal alliance with the French there was little cooperation between the Dutch, and the French and Spanish armed forces in their wars with Great Britain, which the Republic conducted as if it were alone. The French strongly favored informal cooperation in specific projects, however, and the stadtholder was not always able to prevent those. One of these projects was the combination of the French and Dutch fleets at Brest, France in late 1782 (when the main British fleet had sailed to Spain to defend Gibraltar), with the objective of either harassing the British coast, or attacking the British West Indies fleet of Rodney that was expected to return around this time. After long dithering the Dutch decided to provide ten ships of the line for such a project, and Van Bylandt was put in charge of this squadron. When he had inspected the ships he refused point-blank to sail in them, however, as he considered their state of readiness insufficient. In this refusal he was supported by the other Dutch commanders. The Dutch government was therefore forced to admit to the French that it was unable to provide the promised naval support.

This again caused a furor in the Republic and public opinion also held the stadtholder responsible for the fiasco, though he for once had supported the expedition. The States of Holland demanded a public inquiry and the commission that conducted that inquiry recommended prosecution of the officers involved, especially Van Bylandt. This time a court-martial was not deemed to be sufficient, but the case was taken up by a special judicial commission of the States-General at the end of 1783. The trial only started in 1785 (after the war had already ended) and was dragged out by his friends. Meanwhile, the revolt of the Patriots took its course and the Prussian invasion of Holland in 1787, that ended that revolt, also enabled the stadtholder to quietly end the inquiry.

Van Bylandt had never lost the favor of the stadtholder and the latter was now able to promote him to lieutenant admiral. He was given the prestigious function of inspector-general of the naval artillery corps. He died in 1793, still in office. During his career he made great contributions to codification of naval tactics with his Zeetactiek of Grondregelen der krijgskunde ter zee ("Naval tactics or Fundamentals of military science at sea;" Amsterdam, 1767) and he is also credited with restoring discipline in the fleet, which apparently had reached a low level at some point.

== Sources ==
- (in Dutch) Dirks, J.J.B. (1871) De Nederlandsche Zeemagt in Hare verschillende Tijdperken Geschetst. Deel 3
- (in Dutch) "Bylandt, Lodewijk van," in: Molhuysen, P.C. and Blok, P.J. (eds.) (1918) Nieuw Nederlandsch Biografisch Woordenboek. Deel 4, pp. 383–386
- Edler, F. (2001; repr. 1911 ed.) The Dutch Republic and The American Revolution. University Press of the Pacific, ISBN 0-89875-269-8
