= HMS Defiance (1772) =

Ship of the line of the Royal Navy

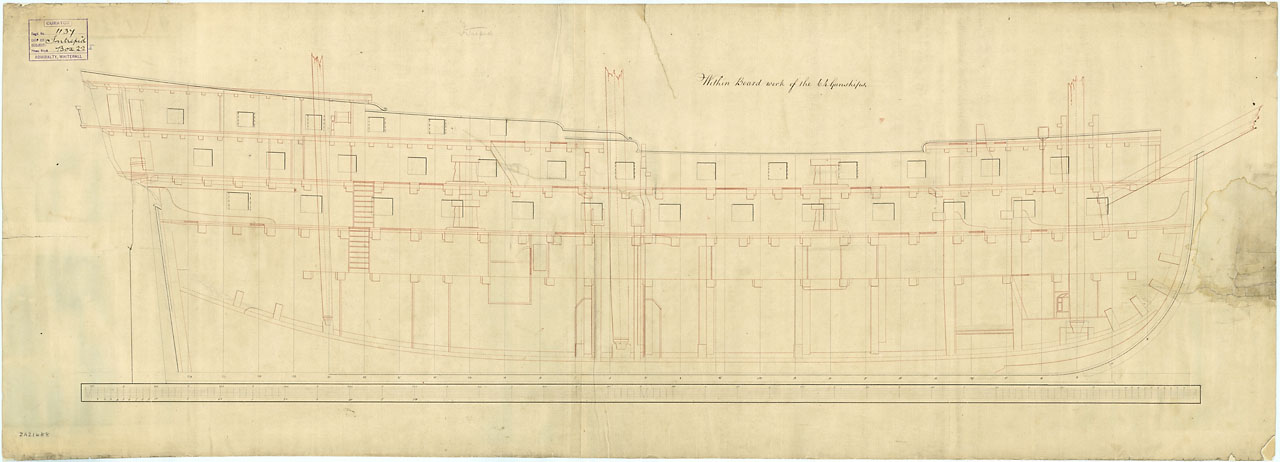
- Defiance

History

Great Britain
- Name: HMS Defiance
- Ordered: 9 June 1768
- Builder: Woolwich Dockyard
- Laid down: 20 October 1768
- Launched: 31 August 1772
- Fate: Wrecked, 1780

General characteristics
- Class & type: Intrepid-class ship of the line
- Tons burthen: 1374 bm
- Length: 159 ft 6 in (48.62 m) (gundeck)
- Beam: 44 ft 4 in (13.51 m)
- Depth of hold: 19 ft (5.8 m)
- Propulsion: Sails
- Sail plan: Full-rigged ship
- Armament: 64 guns: Gundeck: 26 × 24 pdrs; Upper gundeck: 26 × 18 pdrs; Quarterdeck: 10 × 4 pdrs; Forecastle: 2 × 9 pdrs

HMS Defiance was a 64-gun third rate ship of the line of the Royal Navy, launched on 31 August 1772 at Woolwich.

Defiance was wrecked in 1780.
