= HMS Dolphin (1781) =

Fifth-rate of the Royal Navy

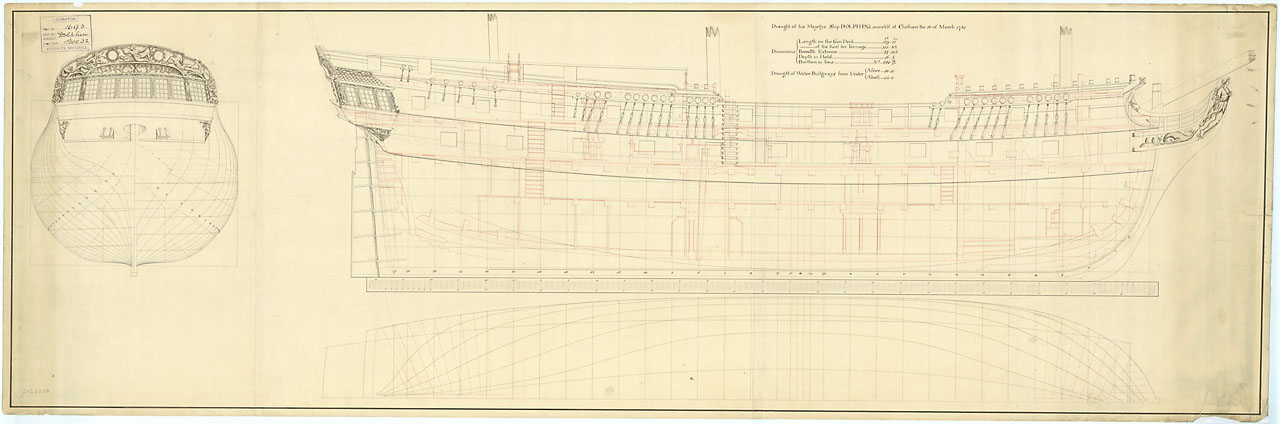
- Plan of HMS Dolphin

History

Great Britain
- Name: HMS Dolphin
- Ordered: 8 January 1777
- Cost: £21,525.10.5d including fitting and coppering
- Launched: 10 March 1781
- Completed: 11 May 1781
- Commissioned: March 1781
- Fate: Broken up

General characteristics
- Class & type: fifth-rate Roebuck-Class
- Tons burthen: 880 1/2 (bm)
- Length: 139 feet 11 inches (42.6 m) (gundeck); 115 feet 6 1/4 inches (35.2 m) (keel)
- Beam: 37 feet 10 1/4 inches (11.5 m)
- Depth of hold: 16 feet 4 inches (5.0 m)
- Propulsion: Sails
- Sail plan: Fully Rigged Ship
- Complement: 280-300
- Armament: Lower deck: 20 × 18-pounder guns; Upper deck: 22 × 9-pounder guns; Forecastle: 2 × 6-pounder guns

HMS Dolphin was a 44-gun fifth rate ship of the Royal Navy launched in 1781. Designed by Sir Thomas Slade, she carried her armament on two decks and had a main battery of 18-pound long guns. She made an appearance at the Battle of Dogger Bank in 1781. The rest of her 36-year career was uneventful, much of it being spent as a transport or hospital ship, armed only with twenty or twenty-four, 9-pounders. She was broken up at Portsmouth in 1817.

== Construction and armament ==
Dolphin was one of the nineteen Roebuck-class fifth-rates built for the Royal Navy between 1776 and 1783. A requirement for a two-deck ship capable of operating in the shallower waters of North America, led to the resurrection of a design by renowned naval architect, Sir Thomas Slade

Ordered by The Admiralty on 8 January 1777, Dolphin was the only one of her class not built under contract, and her keel of 115 feet 6 1/4 inches (35.2 m), was laid down on 1 May at Chatham Dockyard. As built, she was 139 feet 11 inches (42.6 m) long at the gundeck, had a beam of 37 feet 10 1/4 inches (11.5 m), and a depth in the hold of 16 feet 4 inches (5.0 m). She measured 880 47/94 tons burthen.

Dolphin was armed with 20 × 18-pounder guns on her lower deck, 22 × 9-pounder guns on her upper deck and 2 × 6-pounder guns on her forecastle. She did not carry guns on her quarterdeck. She served a number of times as a transport or hospital ship, when she was armed with between twenty and twenty-four 9-pounders on her upper decks.

== Service ==
Dolphin was commissioned for the North Sea in March 1781, under Captain William Blair, and was present at the Battle of Dogger Bank that summer. Britain had declared war on the Dutch Republic the previous December, in retaliation for the latter's support of the American war effort. Dolphin was part of Vice-Admiral Hyde Parker's squadron, which was escorting a convoy from the Baltic, when on 5 August it discovered a fleet of Dutch warships and merchant vessels near Dogger Bank. Each of the forces selected seven ships to do battle. Dolphin stood second in the British line behind HMS Berwick, with HMS Buffalo, HMS Fortitude, HMS Princess Amelia, HMS Preston and HMS Bienfaisant. While the British supply ships continued their journey to England, the Dutch line of battle, comprising the 54-gun Erfprins, the 74-gun Admiraal Generaal, the 40-gun Argo, the 54-gun Batavier, the 68-gun Admiraal de Ruijter, the 54-gun Admiraal Piet Hein and the 68-gun Hollandia, positioned itself between its convoy and the enemy. After a general chase, the British, occupying the windward position, bore down on the Dutch, line abreast, at 06:10. At 08:00 a close action ensued, which continued until mid-morning when the Dutch warships sought to disengage and return to Texel with their convoy. By this time neither side was in a condition to continue the fight and although the British tried to reform their line, they were unable to pursue.

Under her new captain, Robert Manners Sutton, Dolphin sailed for Jamaica on 31 January 1782. When war with the colonies ended in September 1783, Dolphin returned to England, where, between March and June 1784, £5,936.6.8d was spent on repairs at Chatham dockyard. She was then laid up in ordinary.

During the Nootka Crisis in the summer 1789, the Royal Navy began to prepare for war with Spain. In October 1790, work began converting Dolphin to a hospital ship. Costing £3,189, the conversion took until February 1791 by which time the conflict had all but been resolved and Dolphin was taken to Portsmouth, where she was laid up once more.

Recommissioned as a store ship in January 1793, Dolphin was despatched to the Mediterranean when Britain entered the French Revolutionary War in February. In January 1797, Dolphin was part of Horatio Nelson's squadron, sent to evacuate Porto Ferrajo. The commander of the garrison there, General Ulysses de Burgh, refused to leave however and after salvaging what it could in the way of stores and equipment, the squadron left for Gibraltar two days later, on 29 January.

Dolphin was at the capture of Minorca in 1798. The squadron to which she was attached, arrived off the island on 7 November, troops were landed the following day, and by 15 November, the whole island had capitulated. Dolphin was then taken to Lisbon, where she served as a hospital ship.

In January 1800, Dolphin underwent a £9,042 conversion to a troop ship at Deptford Dockyard. The refit took until April, during which time she had her lower guns removed, leaving her with twenty 9-pounders on her upper deck. And in this form, she served in the navy's Egyptian campaign. She was brought back home in January 1802 and paid off in March. Towards the end of 1804, work began turning her into a storeship. She was recommissioned in January the following year for the transport of supplies to Ireland.

Dolphin was taken to the Leeward Islands in October 1805 but returned to Deptford, two years later, for repairs and another refit. The work was completed in November 1808, then early in 1809, under a new command, she went back to the Leeward Islands. Between February and April 1811, Dolphin was in Portsmouth undergoing another large repair and refit. She was later broken up there in July 1817.
