= Jan Bentinck =

Dutch States Navy officer

Wolter Jan Gerrit Bentinck
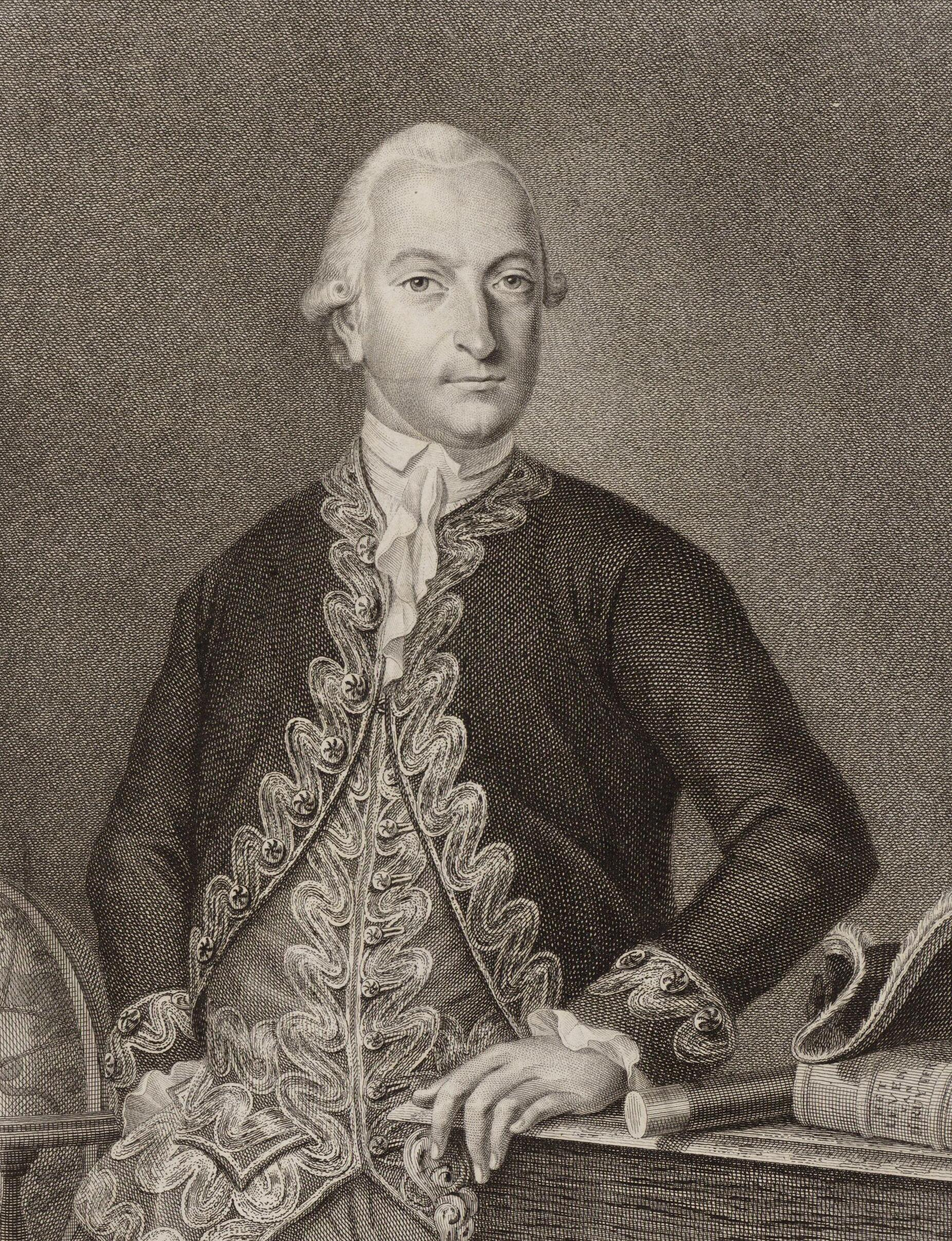
- Portrait of Bentinck
- Born: 30 July 1745; Huis Schoonheten, Dutch Republic
- Died: 24 August 1781 (aged 36); Amsterdam, Dutch Republic
- Military career
- Allegiance: Dutch Republic
- Branch: Dutch States Navy
- Service years: –1781
- Rank: Schout-bij-nacht
- Commands: Batavier
- Conflicts: Dutch-Moroccan War (1775-1777); Fourth Anglo-Dutch War; Battle of Dogger Bank (1781)

Schout-bij-nacht Wolter Jan Gerrit Bentinck (30 July 1745 – 24 August 1781) was a Dutch States Navy officer who served in the Fourth Anglo-Dutch War.

== Life ==
Wolter Jan Gerrit Bentinck was born on 30 July 1745 in Huis Schoonheten as the eighth child and fifth son of Berend Hendrik Bentinck, Lord of Schoonheten and Diepenheim and Bonne Elisabeth Juriana du Tertre. In 1776, he took command of the 24-gun warship Venus,. With the ship he intercepted two Moroccan ships and one xebec as they were attempting to escort captured Dutch merchant vessels to Larache. He and Salomon Dedel destroyed both Moroccan ships.

In 1781, he fought in the Battle of Dogger Bank against the British under the command of Johan Zoutman, accompanying a convoy of 71 merchant ships as captain of the 54-gun Batavier, which mounted a crew of 300 men. On 5 August, they encountered a British squadron and engaged with it. An hour after, Bentinck laid on the deck, being hit by a cannonball on his left shoulder. Because of his injury he had to give up command of his ship, three hours afterwards Batavier had 18 dead and 49 injured crewmen on board.

After a fire broke out, the ship had to be towed back to Den Helder. Bentinck was taken to Amsterdam to the Admiralty of Amsterdam, where he died on 24 August 1781. Bentinck received a state funeral and mausoleum in the Nieuwe Kerk in Amsterdam, at his country's expense.

== Sources ==
- Veenendaal, A.J (1975). Matthijs Sloot : een zeeman uit de achttiende eeuw, 1719–1779 (in Dutch). Nijhoff. ISBN 9024717981.
- de Jonge, Johannes Cornelis; de Jonge, Jan Karel Jakob (1861). Geschiedenis van het Nederlandsche zeewezen Dl. 4 (in Dutch). KB, Nationale Bibliotheek van Nederland: Kruseman.
