= Dutch ship Batavier =

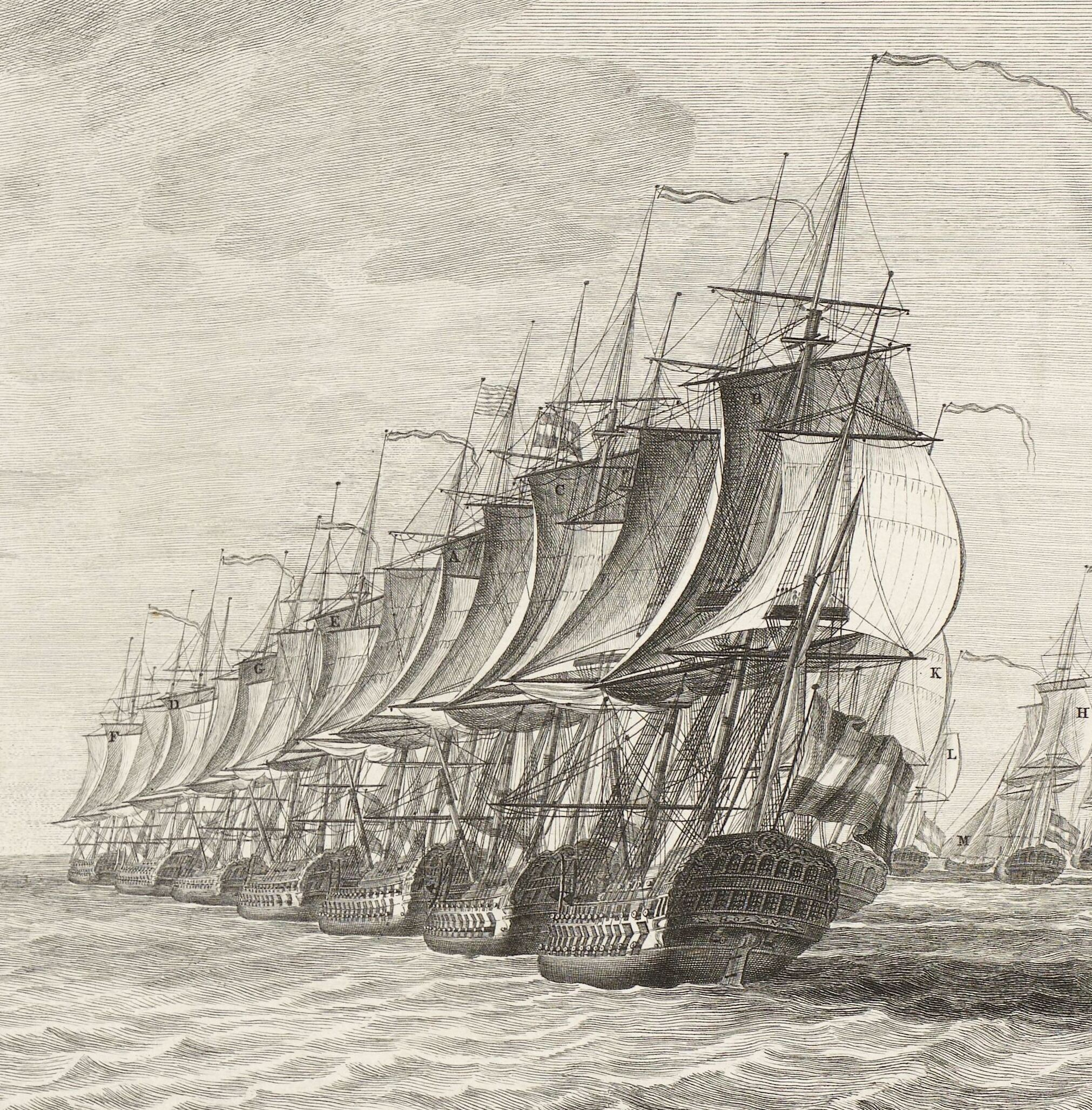
Batavier (1779) (E) at the Battle of Dogger Bank

Four Dutch ships of the Admiralty of Amsterdam (one of five regional navies within the United Provinces of the Netherlands) have borne the name Batavier or Batavia, named after the ancient Germanic tribe of the Batavi, who inhabited the region of Batavia around Nijmegen:

- The 24-gun frigate Batavier (1692) built at Amsterdam in 1692 and burnt by the French after being stranded on a sandbank in August 1695
- The 52-gun ship of the line Batavier (1699) built at Amsterdam in 1699, which was broken up in 1725
- The 64-gun ship of the line Batavia (1746) built at Amsterdam, in 1746, which was broken up in 1778
- The 50-gun ship of the line Batavier (1779) built at Amsterdam in 1779, which in 1795 was taken over by the Batavian Republic and in 1799 was captured by and incorporated into the British Navy
