= French ship Robuste =

Thirteen ships of the French Navy have borne the name Robuste ("Robust"):

== Ships named Robuste ==
- Robuste (1758), a 74-gun ship of the line, condemned in 1783 and taken to pieces in 1784.
- Robuste (1784), a pontoon in Lorient harbour.
- Robuste (1793), a 20-gun corvette
- Robuste (1794), a merchantman requisitioned as a transport
- Robuste (1806), an 80-gun ship of the line
- Robuste (1811), a stone-carrying barge
- Robuste (1828), a transport
- Robuste (1861), a steam paddle tug.
- Robuste (1865), a sail transport.
- Robuste (1913), a tug
- Robuste II (1915), an armed sloop.
- Robuste (1944), a tug, formerly USS YTL-157, which served most of her career in Toulon as Mésange
- Robuste (1960), a coastal tug

== See also ==
- HMS Robust

== Notes and references ==
=== Bibliography ===
- Roche, Jean-Michel (2005). Dictionnaire des bâtiments de la flotte de guerre française de Colbert à nos jours. Vol. 1. Group Retozel-Maury Millau. pp. 372–373. ISBN 978-2-9525917-0-6. OCLC 165892922.
- Roche, Jean-Michel (2005). Dictionnaire des bâtiments de la flotte de guerre française de Colbert à nos jours. Vol. 2. Group Retozel-Maury Millau. p. 250. ISBN 978-2-9525917-0-6. OCLC 165892922.
