= Battle of Dogger Bank (1781) =

1781 battle of the Fourth Anglo-Dutch War

- Part of the Fourth Anglo-Dutch War
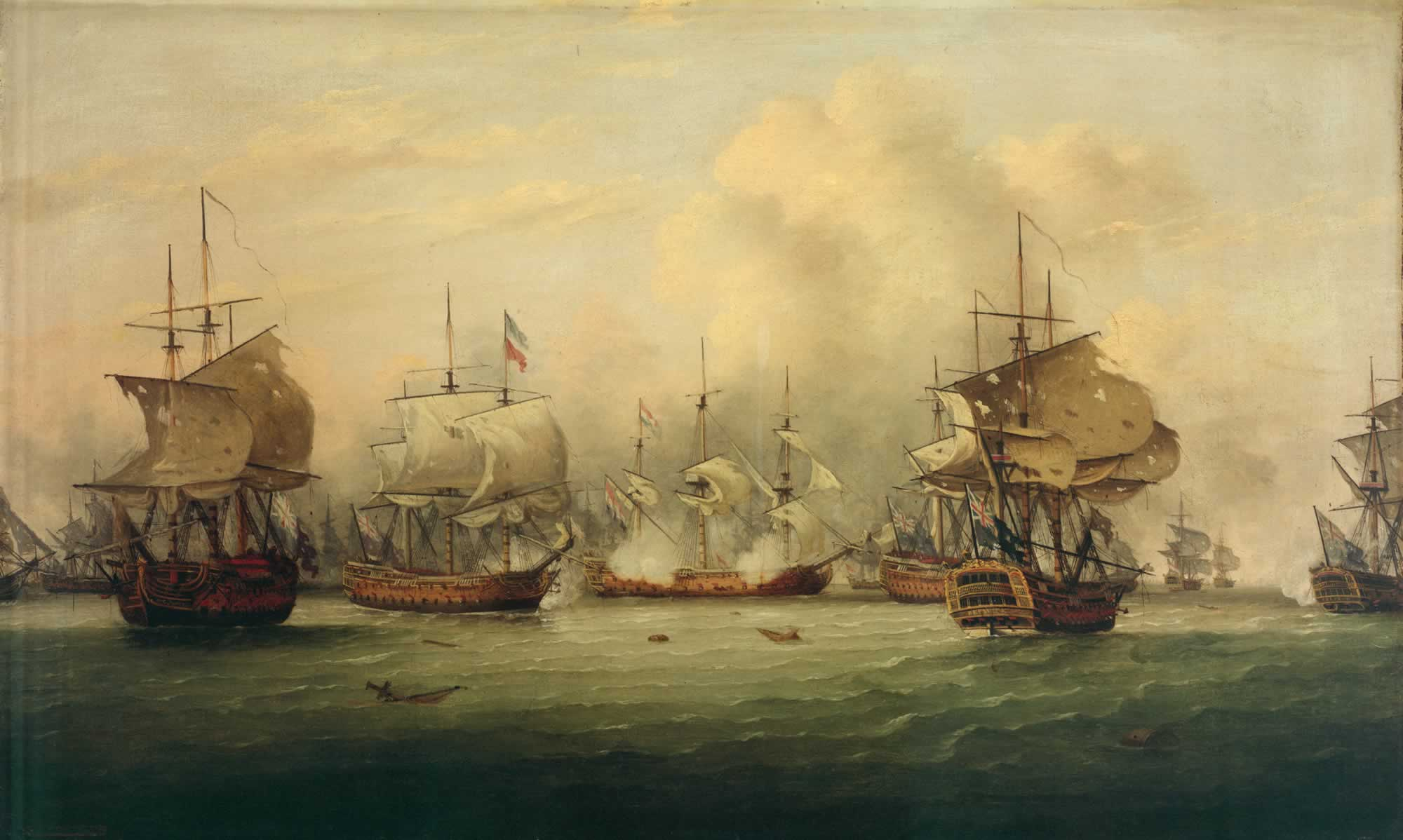
- The Battle of Dogger Bank, 5 August 1781; Thomas Luny, 1781
Date	5 August 1781
Location	Dogger Bank, North Sea 54.724°N 2.769°E
Result	Inconclusive

Belligerents
Great Britain	Dutch Republic

Commanders and leaders
Hyde Parker	Johan Zoutman

Strength
7 ships of the line 5 frigates 1 cutter 3,500 men 442 guns	7 ships of the line 6 frigates 2,600 men 408 guns

Casualties and losses
104 killed; 39 wounded	142 killed; 403 wounded; 1 ship of the line sunk; (Note: Holland, a 68-gun Dutch ship of the line, sank after the battle.)

The Battle of Dogger Bank was a fleet action fought in the North Sea on 5 August 1781 during the Fourth Anglo-Dutch War. It occurred between a British fleet under Vice-Admiral of the Blue Sir Hyde Parker and a Dutch squadron under Schout-bij-nacht Johan Zoutman, both of which were escorting convoys.

== Background ==
In December 1780, Great Britain declared war on the Dutch Republic, drawing it militarily into the American War of Independence. The Dutch had for several years been supplying the Americans and shipping French supplies to the Americans in support of the American war effort, the reason behind the British declaration of war. The opening of hostilities with the Dutch meant that Britain's trade with countries on the Baltic Sea—where key supplies of lumber for naval construction were purchased—was potentially at risk, and that the British had to increase protection of their shipping in the North Sea. In order to accomplish this, the British began blockading the Dutch coast to monitor and intercept any significant attempts to send shipping into or out of Dutch ports, and began to protect merchant shipping convoys with armed vessels.

The Dutch were politically in turmoil, and were consequently unable to mount any sort of effective actions against the British. The result of this inaction was the collapse of their economically important trade. It was finally decided that a merchant fleet had to be launched. On 1 August 1781, a Dutch fleet under Schout-bij-nacht Johan Zoutman and comprising seven ships of the line, six frigates and several smaller warships set sail from the Texel, escorting a convoy of approximately 70 merchantmen. Vice-Admiral of the Blue Sir Hyde Parker was accompanying a British convoy from the Baltic when he spotted Zoutman's fleet at 04:00 on the morning of 5 August. He immediately despatched his convoy toward the English coast, and ordered his line to give chase rather than prepare for battle. Zoutman, whose ships had been interspersed with the merchantmen, signalled his line to form in between Parker and the convoy. The ships of Parker's fleet were not in the best of condition, since great demands were placed on the Royal Navy by the war, and all manner of ships were pressed into service, or did not receive necessary maintenance. Some ships were in such poor condition that the number of guns available to fire was reduced from its normal complement. The ships had had no time to practise the normal fleet manoeuvres. In spite of this, Berwick and Parker's flagship Fortitude, both 74 guns, were both relatively new and in good shape. The Dutch crews were inexperienced as they had not seen any significant action due to the British blockade.

== Battle ==
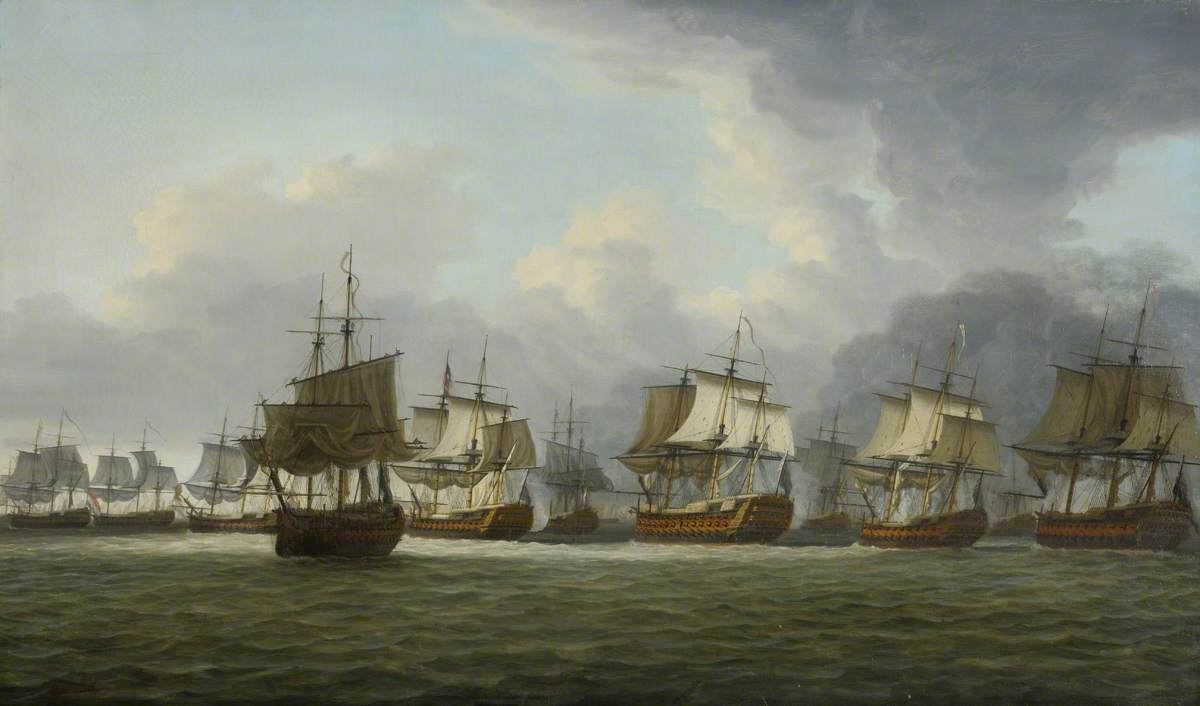
Painting of the battle by Dominic Serres

With a calm sea and a breeze from the north-east, Zoutman manoeuvred his line of battle onto a port tack, heading south-east by east, and awaited the British, who held the weather gage. Parker's fleet closed in, raggedly at first due to the poor condition of some of their ships, into a line of battle abreast in accordance with a signal raised at 06:10. Dolphin and Bienfaisant were ordered to change places, which led to a mistake and placed the former against one of the largest Dutch ships and the latter without an opponent.

When Parker raised the battle flag shortly before 08:00, for close action, his fleet moved closer. The Dutch ships did not fire as the British approached until the two fleets were at point-blank range. Zoutman then also raised his flag and ordered his fleet to fire, with his ship raking Fortitude with a broadside. A close action ensued, lasting for three hours and 40 minutes. Around mid-morning, the Dutch merchant convoy retreated from the action and headed to the Texel. At 11:35, Parker gave the signal to reform his line as his fleet had become unmanageable, with his ships dropping to leeward and manoeuvring to reform their line of battle. However, the British fleet was unable to complete this action due to damage they had suffered in the battle, and Parker decided to withdraw. Zoutman's heavily damaged ships remained at the battlefield for half an hour as proof they had secured it before sailing back to the Dutch Republic.

Casualties on both sides were high, considering the number of ships involved. Fewer casualties were suffered, for example, in the battle of the Chesapeake, fought a month later between fleets more than twice as large. The British reported their losses at 104 killed and 339 wounded, while the Dutch reported their losses at 142 killed and 403 wounded. British historian William Laird Clowes noted that certain reports suggested that the Dutch casualties were actually much higher, possibly reaching 1,100 killed and wounded. The heavily damaged Dutch ship of the line Holland sank later that night. The British frigate Belle Poule came upon her; her colours, still flying, were captured and carried to Parker.

== Aftermath ==
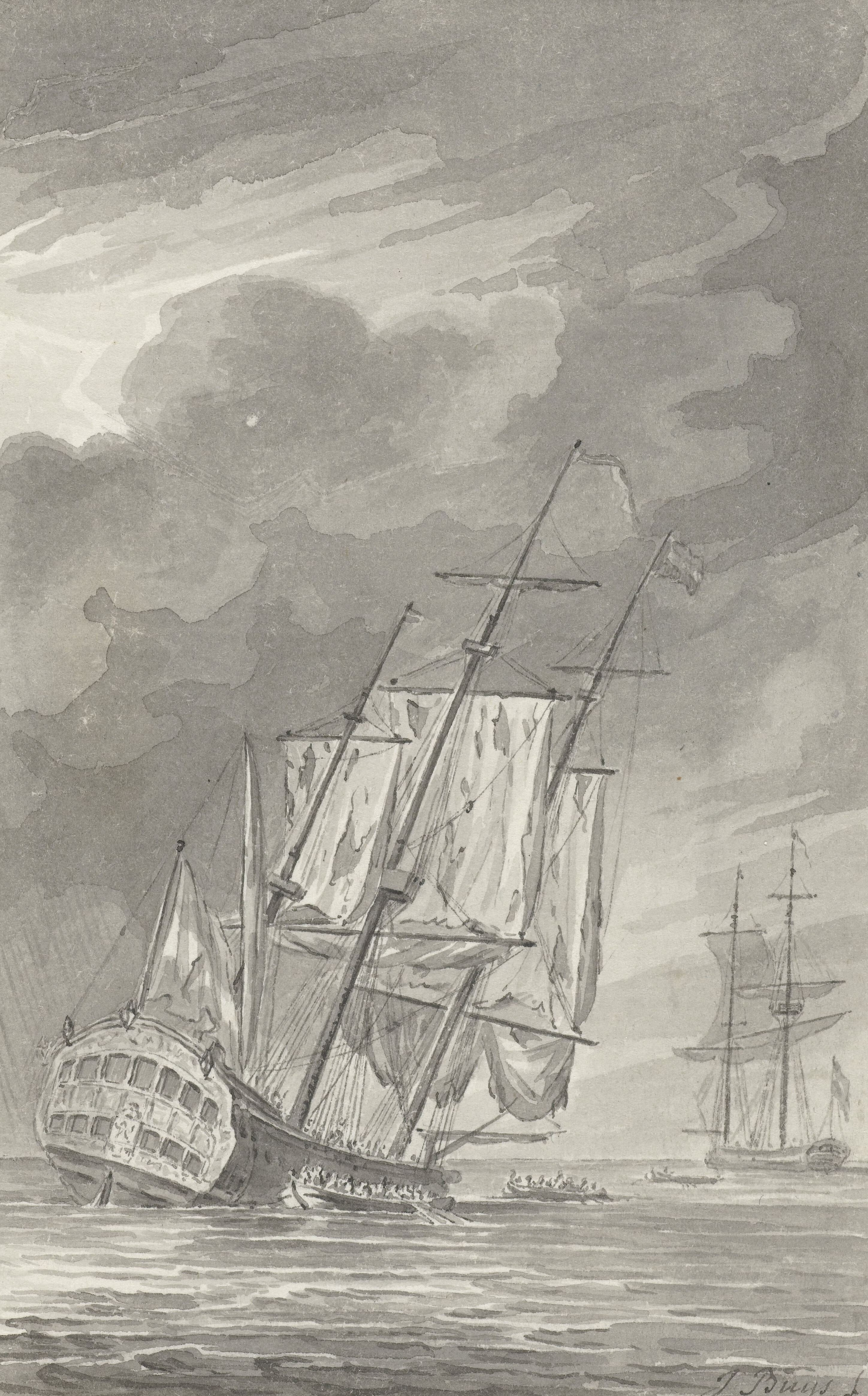
Holland sinking after the battle

Both sides claimed victory and both convoys escaped. Parker's fleet withdrew from the battle first, but Zoutman's had lost a ship of the line and strategically the battle was a British victory since the Dutch fleet retreated to Texel and did not leave harbour again during the war. In addition, Dutch merchant trade remained crippled by the constant capture of their merchantmen by British privateers. At least one Dutch convoy made it to the Baltic, but it flew under the Swedish flag and was accompanied by a Swedish Navy frigate.

Parker, on his return, considered that he had not been properly equipped for his task. Upon his arrival at the Nore, he met George III and told him "I wish Your Majesty better ships and younger officers. As for myself, I am now too old for the service". Parker then resigned his command. In the Dutch Republic, the battle was the subject of widespread celebration. The last major fleet action the Dutch navy had participated before the battle of was the Battle of Málaga in 1704, and now it had held its ground against the Royal Navy. The Dutch commanders were showered with praise and a wave of jingoism erupted in the Dutch Republic. The fact that the battle had failed to change the strategic situation was ignored.

== Order of battle ==
=== British ===
==== Ships of the line ====
- Berwick, 74 guns – Captain John Ferguson
- Dolphin, 44 guns – Captain William Blair
- Buffalo, 60 guns – Captain William Truscott
- Fortitude, 74 guns – Captain George Robertson, Parker's flag
- Princess Amelia, 80 guns – Captain John Macartney †
- Preston, 50 guns – Captain Alexander Graeme
- Bienfaisant, 64 guns – Captain Richard Brathwaite

==== Other vessels with the fleet ====
- Artois, 40 guns, fifth rate – Captain John MacBride
- Latona, 38 guns, fifth rate – Captain Hyde Parker
- Belle Poule, 36 guns, fifth rate – Captain Philip Patton
- Cleopatra, 32 guns, fifth rate – Captain George Murray
- Surprise, 14 guns, cutter – Lieutenant Peter Rivett

==== With the convoy ====
- Iphigenia, 32 guns, fifth rate – Captain Charles Hope
- Tartar, 28 guns, sixth rate – Captain Robert Sutton
- Cabot, 14 guns, brig – Commander Henry Cromwell
- Alert, 14 guns, cutter – Commander James Vashon
- Leith, 20 guns, armed ship – Commander Peter Rothe
- Busy, 14 guns, cutter – Lieutenant William Furnivall
- Sprightly, 14 guns, cutter – Lieutenant J. B. Swan

=== Dutch ===
==== Ships of the line ====
- Erfprins, 54 guns – Captain A. Braak – 8 killed and 30 wounded
- Admiraal Generaal, 74 guns – Commodore Jan Hendrik van Kinsbergen – 7 killed and 41 wounded
- Argo, Frigate, 44 guns – Captain A. C. Staering – 24 killed and 75 wounded
- Batavier, 56 guns – Captain Jan Bentinck – 18 killed and 49 wounded
- Admiraal de Ruijter, 68 guns – Captain Staringh, Zoutman's flagship – 44 killed and 87 wounded
- Admiraal Piet Hein, 54 guns – Captain W. van Braam – 10 killed and 58 wounded
- Holland, 68 guns – Captain S. Dedel (sank after battle) – 25 killed and 45 wounded

==== Other vessels with the fleet ====
- Bellona, 36 guns – Captain Haringcarspel Decker
- Dolfijn, 24 guns – Captain Mulder
- Ajax, 20 guns – Captain Grave van Welderen
- Eensgezindheit, 36 guns – Captain Bouritius
- Zephijr, 36 guns – Captain Wiertz
- Amphitrite, 36 guns – Captain van Woensel

==== With the convoy ====
- Medemblik, 36 guns – Captain van Rijneveld
- Venus, 24 guns – Captain Grave van Regteren
- Spion, 16 guns – Commander Stutzer
- Zwaluw, 10 guns – Commander Butger

== Bibliography ==
- Allen, Joseph, Battles of the British Navy, Vol. 1, H. G. Bohn, London, (1852)
- Blok, Petrus Johannes. History of the People of the Netherlands
- Clowes, Sir William Laird (1898). The Royal Navy: a history from the earliest times to the present, Vol. 3
- Davies, Charles Maurice. The history of Holland and the Dutch nation, Vol. 3
- Edler, F. (2001) [1911]. The Dutch Republic and The American Revolution. Honolulu: University Press of the Pacific. ISBN 0-89875-269-8.
- Penrose, John (1850). Lives of Vice-Admiral Sir Charles Vinicombe Penrose, K. C. B., and Captain Trevenen. J. Murray (publisher), Harvard University.
- Syrett, David (1998). The Royal Navy in European Waters During the American Revolutionary War Studies in maritime history. Univ of South Carolina Press. ISBN 978-1-57003-238-7.
- Brand, Ron (2010). Zeehelden, kooplieden, lords en ladies op kasteel Keukenhof [Sea heroes, merchants, lords and ladies at Keukenhof Castle] (in Dutch). Verloren. ISBN 9789087041700.
- Van Nimwegen, Olaf (2023). Willem V: De laatste stadhouder van Nederland 1748–1806 [William V: The last stadholder of the Netherlands 1748–1806] (in Dutch). Prometheus. ISBN 978-90-446-4821-8.
- De Jonge, Johannes Cornelis (1843). Geschiedenis van het Nederlandsche zeewezen Deel 5: Van den Utrechtschen Vrede, Ao. 1713, tot den zeeslag van Doggersbank, Ao. 1781. Dl. 5, Deel 5 (in Dutch). Van Cleef.
