= Samuel Warren (Royal Navy officer) =

British Royal Navy officer (1769-1839)

Rear-Admiral Sir Samuel Warren KCB KCH
- Born: 9 January 1769; Sandwich, Kent
- Died: 15 October 1839 (aged 70); Southampton, Hampshire
- Military career
- Allegiance: United Kingdom of Great Britain and Ireland, and Kingdom of Great Britain
- Branch: Royal Navy
- Service years: 1782–1839
- Rank: Rear-Admiral
- Commands: HMS Scourge; HMS Vesuvius; HMS Glory; HMS Diadem; HMS Bellerophon; HMS President; HMS Blenheim; HMS Bulwark; HMS Seringapatam; HMY William and Mary
- Conflicts: American Revolutionary War; Relief of Gibraltar; Battle of Cape Spartel; French Revolutionary Wars; Atlantic campaign of May 1794; Glorious First of June; Battle of Groix; Napoleonic Wars; Battle of Cape Finisterre; Invasion of Java
- Awards: Knight Commander of the Order of the Bath; Knight Commander of the Royal Guelphic Order; Knight Bachelor

Sir Samuel Warren KCB KCH (9 January 1769 – 15 October 1839) was an officer of the Royal Navy who served during the American War of Independence, and the French Revolutionary and Napoleonic Wars.

Warren entered the navy towards the end of the American War of Independence, and after seeing service at several actions in European waters, served on a number of ships prior to the outbreak of the French Revolutionary Wars. A lieutenant by then, he was at the Glorious First of June and the Battle of Groix, before being promoted to his own commands. He was successful against French privateers and merchants in the Caribbean in HMS Scourge, before being promoted to captain in 1802. He saw action in command of a ship of the line at the Battle of Cape Finisterre in 1805, before supporting operations off the Río de la Plata in 1806 and 1807.

Warren took command of HMS Bellerophon in 1808 and served in the Baltic Sea, carrying out operations against Russian shipping. He then commanded a frigate, in which he was charged with transporting Lucien Bonaparte and his family to England. He then sailed to the East Indies and played an important role in the Invasion of Java in 1811. He was made a Companion of the Bath at the end of the Napoleonic Wars in 1815, and commanded several more ships, including the royal yacht. He also held a number of shore appointments, being knighted and made a Knight Commander of the Royal Guelphic Order in 1835. Promoted to rear-admiral in 1837, he was made a Knight Commander of the Bath shortly before his death in 1839.

== Family and early life ==
Samuel Warren was born in Sandwich, Kent, on 9 January 1769. He entered the navy in January 1782, serving as a midshipman aboard the 64-gun HMS Sampson under the command of Captain John Harvey, who was a relation of Warren's. Warren went out in Sampson with the fleet sent to relieve Gibraltar under Lord Howe, and later saw action at the Battle of Cape Spartel on 20 October 1782. Warren later served aboard the 10-gun cutter HMS Busy, the 32-gun HMS Druid, the 74-gun HMS Colossus, the 98-gun HMS London, and the 100-gun HMS Royal Sovereign.

He was promoted to lieutenant on 3 November 1790 and appointed to the 44-gun HMS Argo, followed by the 74-gun HMS Ramillies. He was serving aboard the Ramillies, commanded by Captain Henry Harvey, soon after the outbreak of the French Revolutionary Wars. Ramillies formed part of Lord Howe's fleet during the Atlantic campaign of May 1794, and Warren was involved in Howe's victory at the Glorious First of June that year. From the Ramillies Warren moved to the 100-gun HMS Royal George and was again in action against the French, when Royal George became the flagship of Admiral Lord Bridport, and took part in the Battle of Groix on 23 June 1795.

== Command ==
Warren was promoted to commander on 1 March 1797 and appointed to the 18-gun HMS Scourge. He took her out to the West Indies and enjoyed considerable success against French warships, privateers and merchant vessels over the three-year period of his command. He took the 6-gun privateer Sarazine off Marie-Galante on 28 September 1797, followed by the capture, with the assistance of HMS Aimable, the 14-gun brig Triomphe on 6 April 1798. Scourge went on to capture the 2-gun privateer Chasseur off Puerto Rico on 8 April 1798, and destroyed another small privateer on 1 May 1798. Before his departure from the Caribbean, Warren received the thanks of the House of Assembly of Tobago for his services, and sailed back to Britain to pay off Scourge. He arrived on 22 August 1800, and in September the following year Warren was appointed to command the bomb vessel HMS Vesuvius. Vesuvius was appointed to the squadron in the Channel under the command of Rear-Admiral Horatio Nelson, aboard HMS Lion. He paid her off after the signing of the Treaty of Amiens, and was promoted to post-captain on 29 April 1802.

== Napoleonic Wars ==
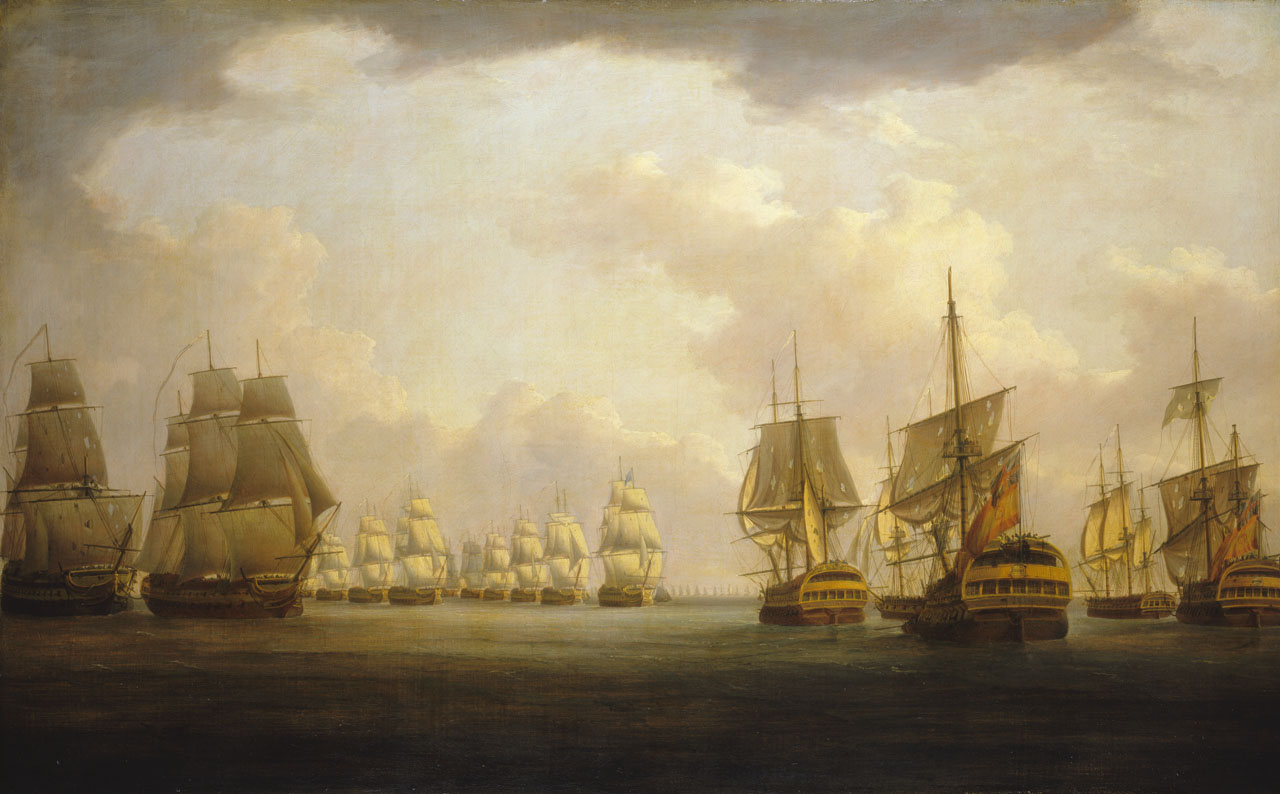
Admiral Sir Robert Calder's action off Cape Finisterre, 23 July 1805, by William Anderson

Left without a ship during the peace, the outbreak of the Napoleonic Wars provided further opportunities for Warren. He was asked by Rear-Admiral William Domett to be his flag captain, and commissioned the 98-gun HMS Glory. Domett was unable to raise his flag due to ill-health, and instead Glory became the flagship of Rear-Admiral Sir Charles Stirling. Stirling retained Warren as his flag-captain, and Glory sailed in July 1805 to join the fleet amassing off Cape Finisterre under Vice-Admiral Robert Calder, with orders to intercept a Franco-Spanish fleet under Vice-Admiral Pierre-Charles Villeneuve. Calder successfully made the interception and Warren commanded Glory at the Battle of Cape Finisterre on 22 July 1805.

Warren left Glory in July the following year, still serving with Stirling and going out with him as a passenger aboard HMS Sampson to participate in operations off the Río de la Plata. On their arrival off Montevideo Stirling appointed Warren to command his flagship, the 64-gun HMS Diadem, and the navy operated in support of the assault on the city.

=== Baltic service ===
On 8 June 1808 he superseded Captain Edward Rotheram in command of the 74-gun HMS Bellerophon. Warren was ordered to join the fleet in the North Sea, blockading the Dutch ports as part of Rear-Admiral Alan Gardner's squadron. By 1809 the strategic situation in the Baltic had deteriorated after Russia signed the Treaties of Tilsit and began to support France. Bellerophon was ordered to join the fleet stationed in the Baltic under Admiral Sir James Saumarez. Saumarez dispatched Bellerophon and HMS Minotaur north to the Gulf of Finland in June, and on 19 June the two ships came across three suspicious looking luggers, anchored off Hango. The water was too shallow to allow them to approach the luggers, so Warren dispatched a boat party. The British boarded the luggers, but found themselves in a trap, when numerous Russian shore batteries and several gunboats opened fire on them. The British commander promptly ordered the luggers to be burnt, reboarded his men and landed them next to the nearest Russian shore battery. The battery, defended by 100 sailors, was stormed and carried, the British spiked the guns and destroyed the magazine, before returning to the ships with only five men wounded.

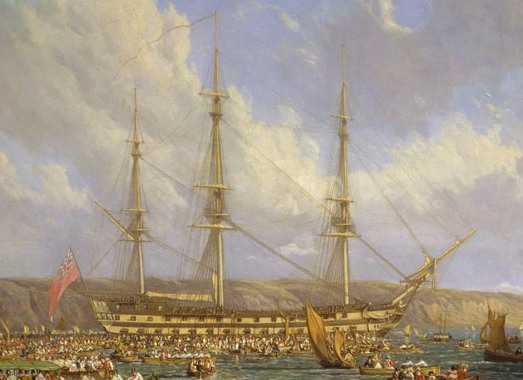
HMS Bellerophon, detail from Scene in Plymouth Sound in August 1815, an 1816 painting by John James Chalon. Warren commanded her in the Baltic between 1808 and 1809.

By July Bellerophon was part of a squadron commanded by Captain Thomas Byam Martin of HMS Implacable. They were off Percola Point on 7 July when a flotilla of eight Russian gunboats was sighted. A boat party led by Lieutenant Hawkey of Implacable made an attempt to cut-out the vessels that evening. Hawkey was killed in the attempt, but Bellerophon's Lieutenant Charles Allen took over command, and six of the gunboats were captured, and a seventh destroyed, with 12 craft containing stores for the Russian Army also being taken. Bellerophon made several cruises during the rest of the year, visiting Åland and Karlskrona, before returning to Britain with a convoy in November 1809.

=== East Indies ===
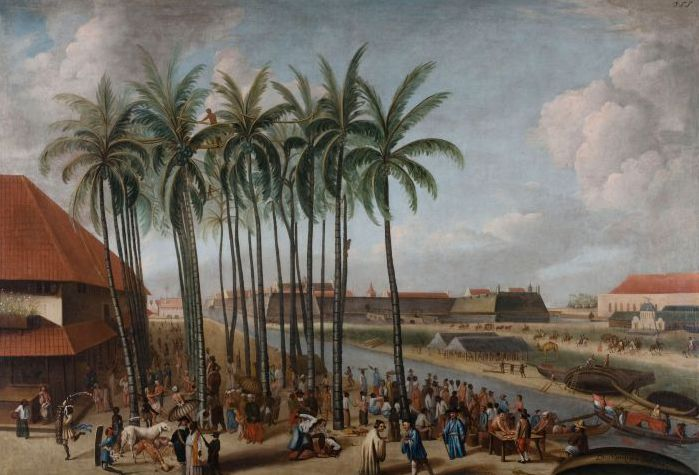
Batavia, capital of the Dutch East Indies. Warren was part of the British force which captured the city, and the island of Java, in 1811.

After paying off Bellerophon Warren was appointed to command the 44-gun HMS President in September 1810. He was assigned to transport Lucien Bonaparte, Napoleon's brother, and his family from Malta to England, after which he sent to reinforce the British squadrons in the East Indies. He left for the Cape of Good Hope on 31 December 1810, in company with the frigates HMS Malacca and HMS Galatea. After calling at the Cape, Warren pressed on to the East Indies, and became involved in the operations to capture Java between August and September 1811. On board President with Warren was Sergeant Joseph Higginson. On 4 September he was sent into Cirebon to negotiate the surrender of the town to the British. The garrison agreed to surrender, with several important French and Dutch officers falling into British hands. After the surrender of the island to the British on 18 September by General Jan Willem Janssens, Warren accompanied the commander in chief, Vice-Admiral Robert Stopford, back to Britain. He was then appointed to the 74-gun HMS Blenheim, and commanded her in the Mediterranean from June 1813 until the peace in 1814.

== Later life ==
With the final end of the Napoleonic Wars in 1815, Warren was nominated one of the first Companions of the Bath in the restructuring of the order. He took command of the 74-gun HMS Bulwark in 1818 and was flag captain to Rear-Admiral Sir John Gore, moving to take over the 46-gun HMS Seringapatam in 1820. Warren commanded her until paying off on 5 February 1824. In 1822, Seringapatam was in the Mediterranean, and on 7 May she passed the island of Chios, saw it in flames, and received signals from Greek ships asking for help, but being under orders to observe strict neutrality in the Greek War of Independence Warren gave no assistance and proceeded to Corfu. His services while in command of her included transporting Sir Benjamin Bloomfield, the ambassador to Stockholm, in mid-1823. Warren became resident agent of transports at Deptford in January 1830, and commodore in the Thames in 1831, commanding the yacht HMY William and Mary. He then became Captain Superintendent at Woolwich Dockyard until his promotion to rear-admiral on 10 January 1837. He had been nominated a Knight Commander of the Royal Guelphic Order on 3 August 1835, and knighted at the same time. He was advanced to a Knight Commander of the Bath on 18 April 1839. Rear-Admiral Sir Samuel Warren died at Southampton on 15 October 1839. He had married in 1800, and left behind a large family.
