= William Blair (Royal Navy officer) =

Scottish naval officer (1741–1782)

Captain William Blair
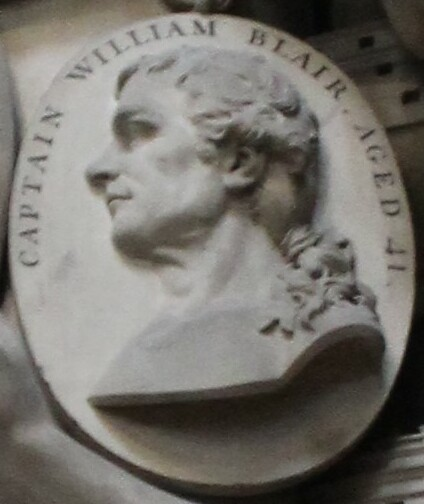
- Born: 1741; Scotland, Great Britain
- Died: 9–12 April 1782 (aged 41); Off Dominica, Caribbean Sea
- Military career
- Allegiance: Great Britain
- Service: Royal Navy
- Service years: 1760–1782
- Rank: Post-captain
- Commands: HMS Dolphin; HMS Anson
- Conflicts: Fourth Anglo-Dutch War; Battle of Dogger Bank; American Revolutionary War; Battle of Grenada; Battle of the Saintes †

William Blair (1741–1782) was a Scottish officer in the Royal Navy. He became lieutenant in 1760, commander in 1777, and post-captain in 1778. He fought the Dutch at Dogger Bank in 1781, and was killed in battle with the French off Dominica in 1782.

== Life ==
William Blair was the son of Daniel Blair of Edinburgh, collaterally related to the Blairs of Balthayock. He first went to sea in merchant ships, and later served in the Royal Navy, as surgeon's servant, able seaman, and midshipman, in the Windsor, Firebrand, Amazon, Aleide, Hussar, and Eolus. He passed his lieutenant's examination on 30 May 1760, and was made a lieutenant on 9 October 1760. He served as lieutenant in the Grenado, Superb, Centurion, Salisbury, and Grafton, but did not attain his commander's rank till 6 December 1777, when he commanded the sloop Wasp.

Promoted post-captain on 18 April 1778, Blair captained Vice-admiral Byron's flagship, the Princess Royal, of 90 guns, in the action off Grenada on 6 July 1779, and was later appointed to the Nonsuch. From 2 March 1781 he commanded the Dolphin, of 44 guns, and in her saw action in the bloody battle on the Dogger Bank on 5 August 1781. Notwithstanding her small force, the exigencies of the case compelled the Dolphin to take her place in the line of battle. Blair's conduct was distinguished, and won for him the special approval of the admiralty, and his appointment to the Anson, a new 64-gun ship, then fitting for service in the West Indies.

In January 1782 Blair sailed in company with Sir George Rodney's fleet, and on 12 April, when the French were completely defeated in the battle of the Saintes, to leeward of Dominica, the Anson was in the leading squadron under the immediate command of Rear-admiral Drake, and was heavily engaged from the very beginning of the battle. Her loss was not especially great in point of numbers, but one of her killed was Captain Blair. In the heat of the action a round-shot, sweeping some 3 ft (0.9 m) above the deck, struck Blair at the waist, smashing his body right in two and carrying half of it across the deck and up against the bulwarks on the farther side.

A monument to Captain William Blair's memory, jointly with his fellow officers, Captains William Bayne and Lord Robert Manners, was designed by Joseph Nollekens and erected by order of Parliament in Westminster Abbey at the public expense. The 25 ft (7.6 m) high marble monument was not completed till 1793. It consists of a figure of Fame standing atop a column which has relief portraits of the captains attached, above figures of Britannia and a lion opposite figures of Neptune and a sea-horse.

== Gallery ==
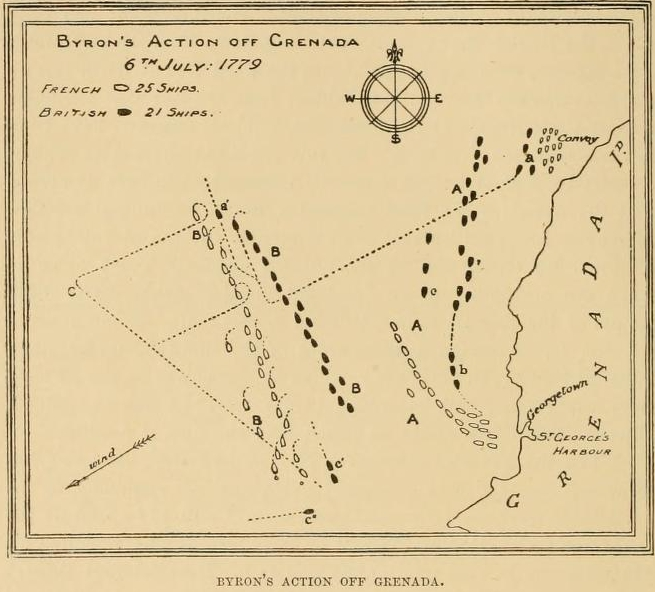
Byron's action off Grenada, 6 July 1779

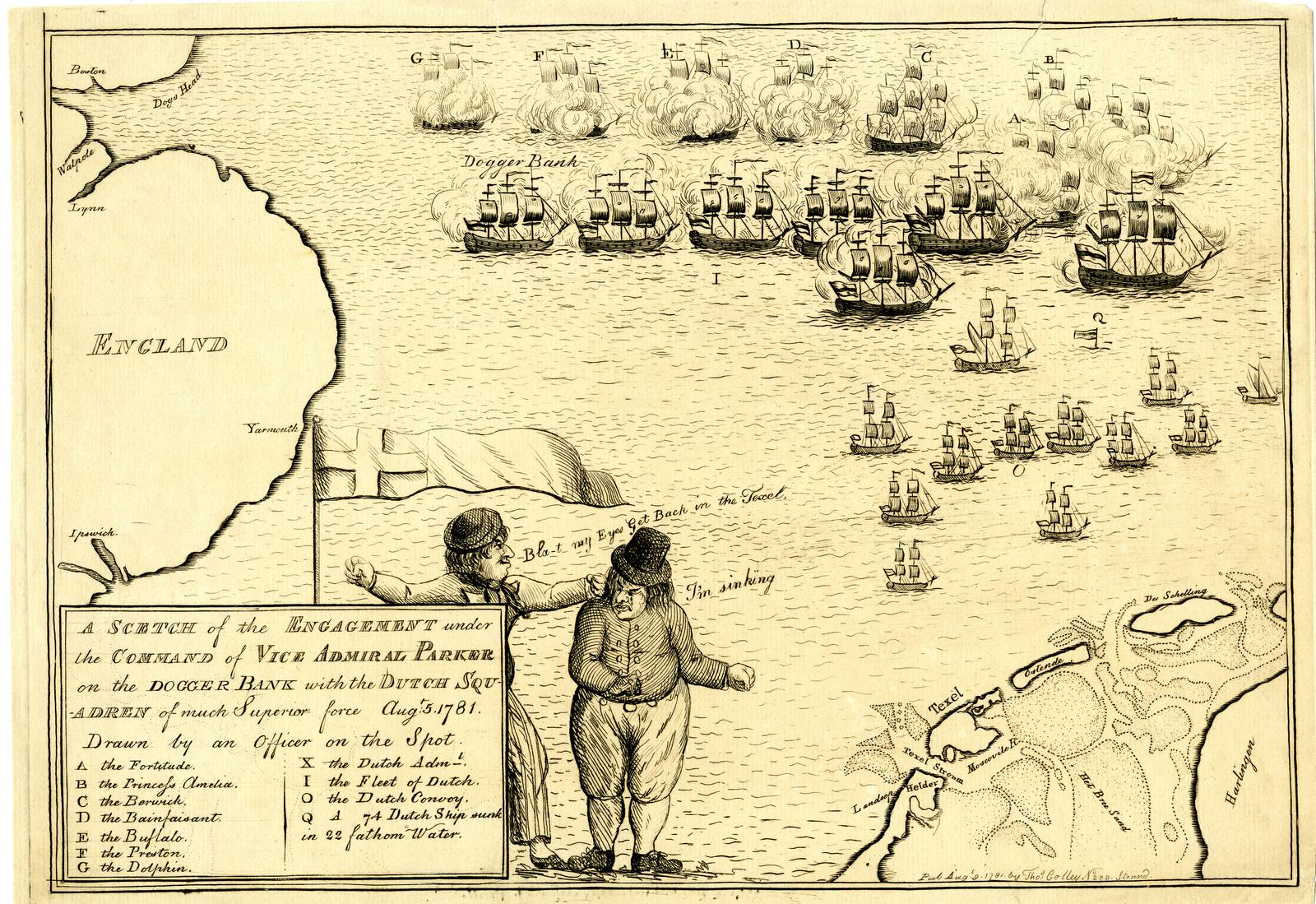
Scetch of the Engagement on the Dodder Bank, 5 August 1781

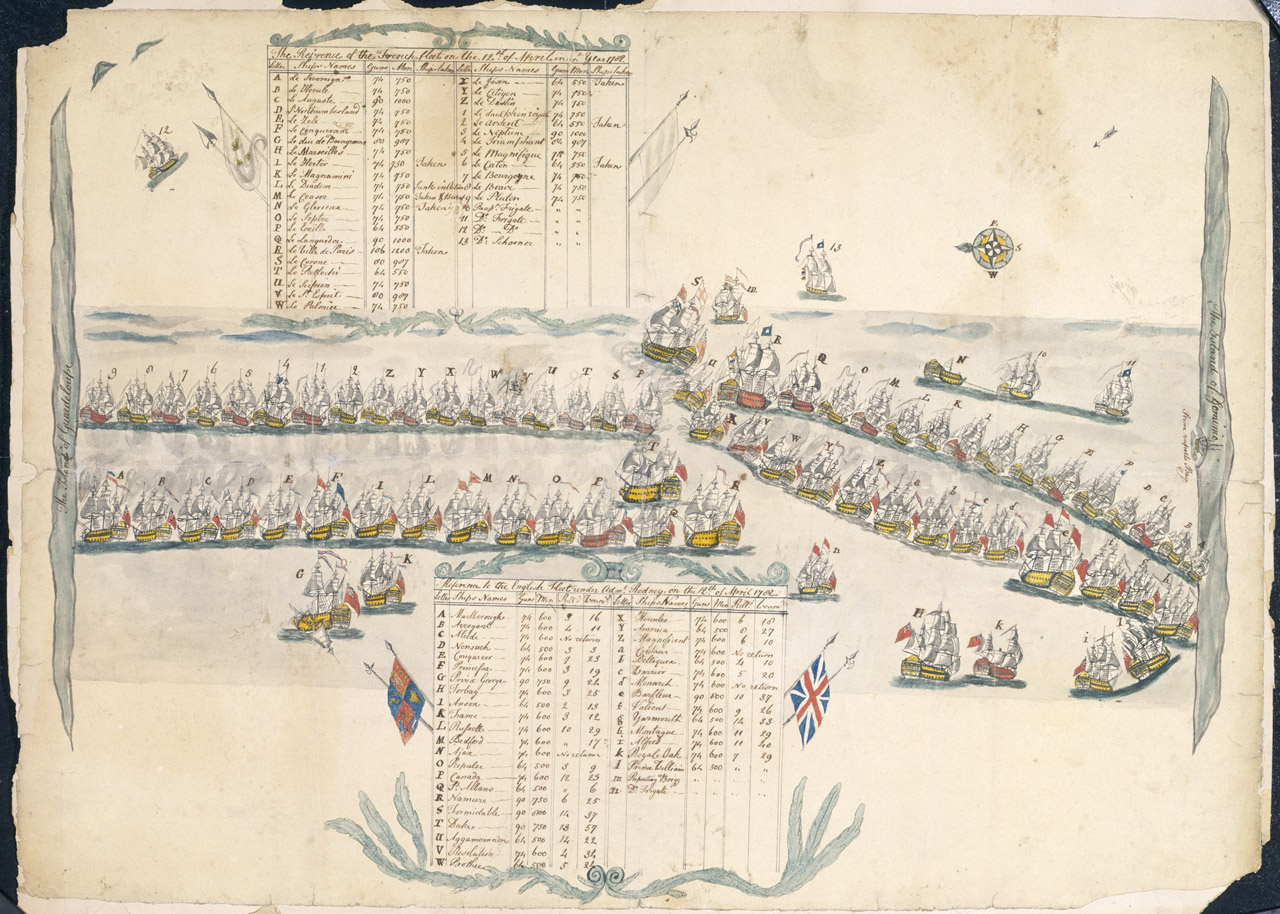
Position of the Fleets at the Battle of the Saintes, 12 April 1782

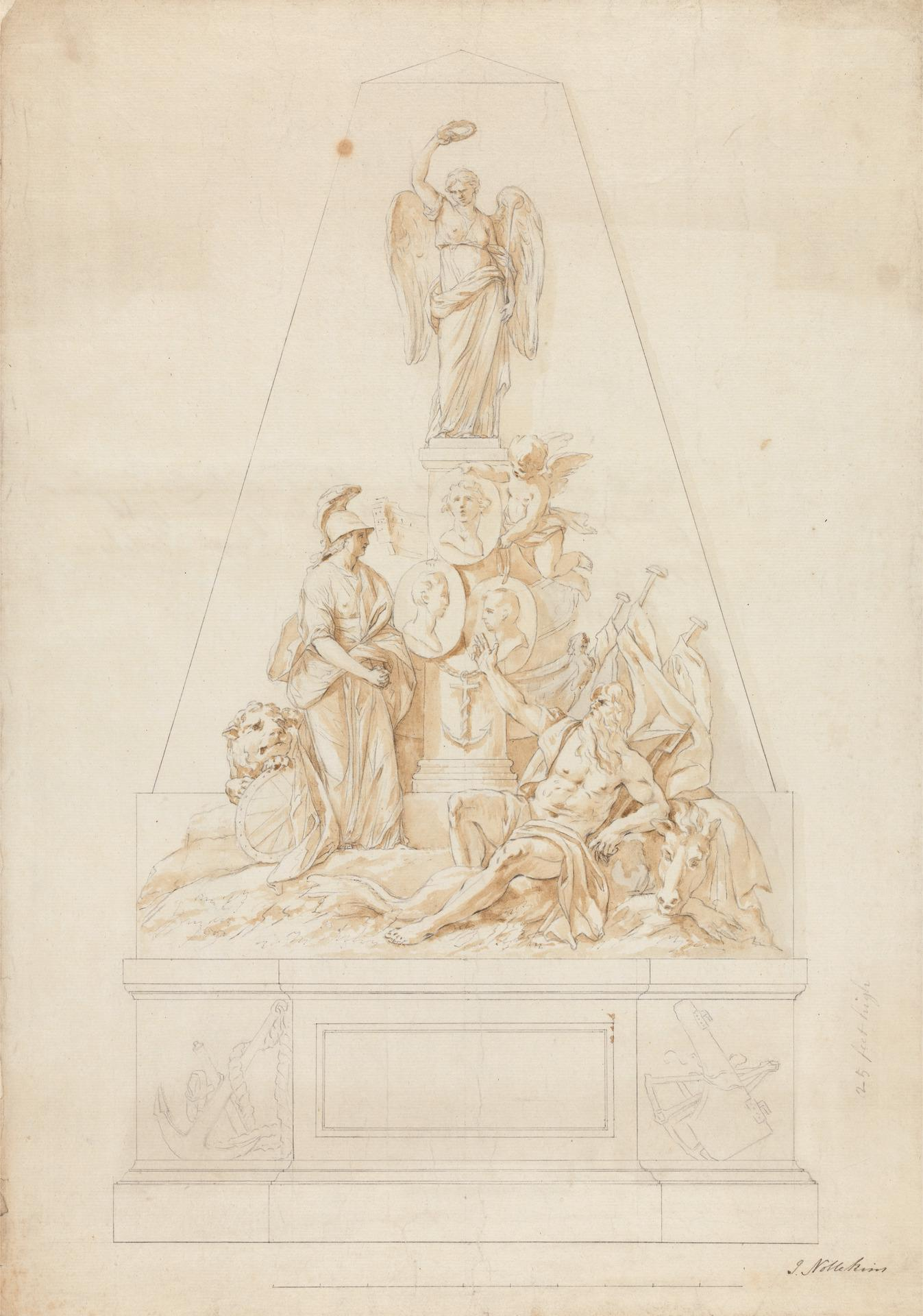
Study for the Three Captains monument, c. 1782

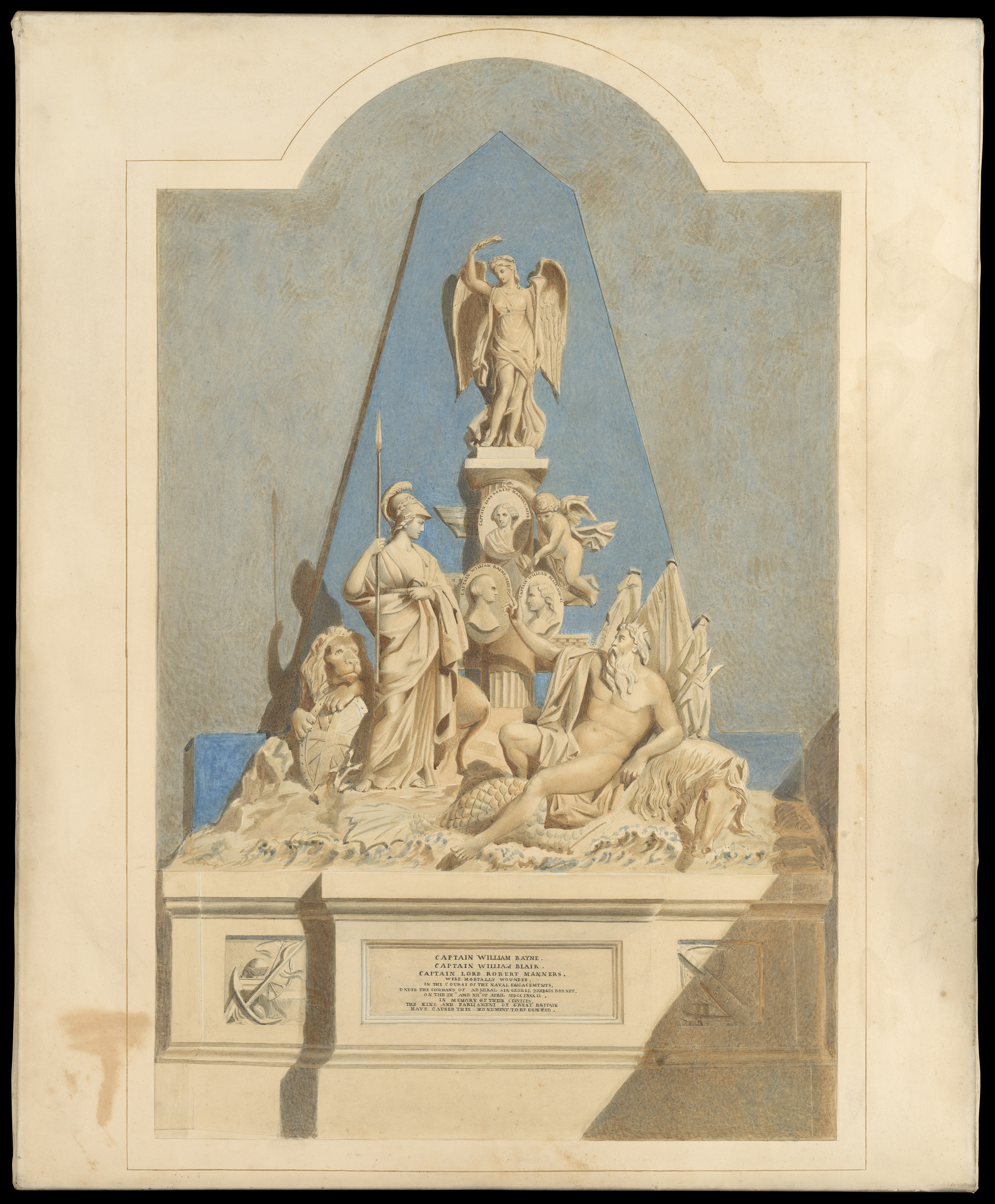
Design for the Three Captains memorial, c. 1784

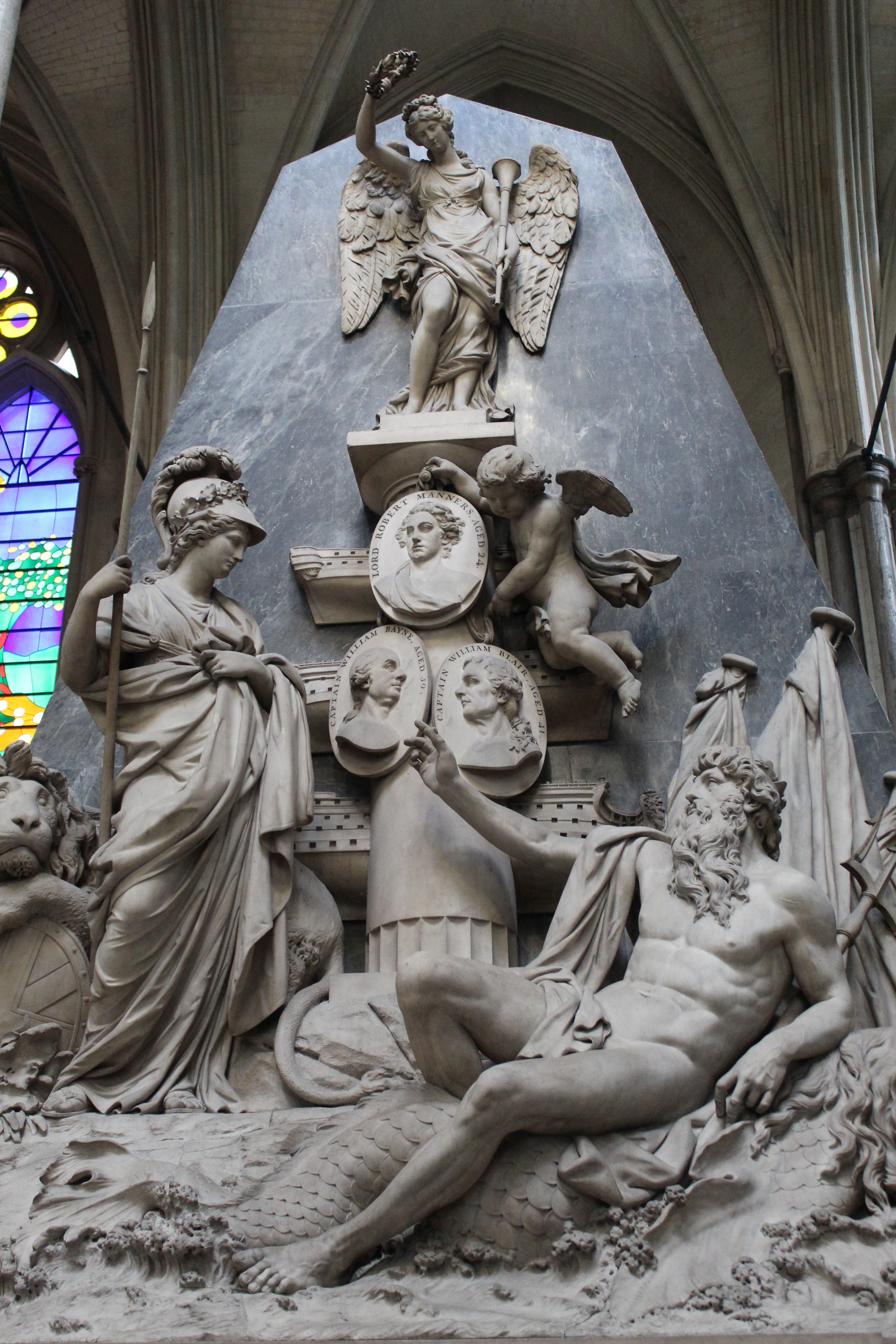
The Three Captains monument, Westminster Abbey

== Sources ==
- Fraser, Edward (1904). Famous Fighters of the Fleet: Glimpses through the Cannon Smoke in the Days of the Old Navy. London: Macmillan and Co., Limited. pp. 107, 110–111
- Laughton, J. K.; Cock, Randolph (2008). "Blair, William (1741–1782), naval officer". Oxford Dictionary of National Biography (online ed.). Oxford University Press. doi:10.1093/ref:odnb/2573. (Subscription, Wikipedia Library access or UK public library membership required.)
- "Biographical Memoir of … George Brydges, Lord Rodney". The Naval Chronicle. Vol. 1. London: Burney & Gold, January–June 1799. pp. 390, 393, 396.
- "Captain William Blair". The British Museum (BIOG197488). Retrieved 10 February 2023.
- "Saturday's Post / House of Commons, May 24". Jackson's Oxford Journal. 25 May 1782. p. 3.
- "William Blair". Westminster Abbey. Retrieved 10 February 2023.

Attribution:

- This article incorporates text from a publication now in the public domain: Laughton, John Knox (1886). "Blair, William (1741-1782)". In Stephen, Leslie (ed.). Dictionary of National Biography. Vol. 5. London: Smith, Elder & Co. pp. 167–168.
