= HMS Busy (1778) =

Cutter of the Royal Navy

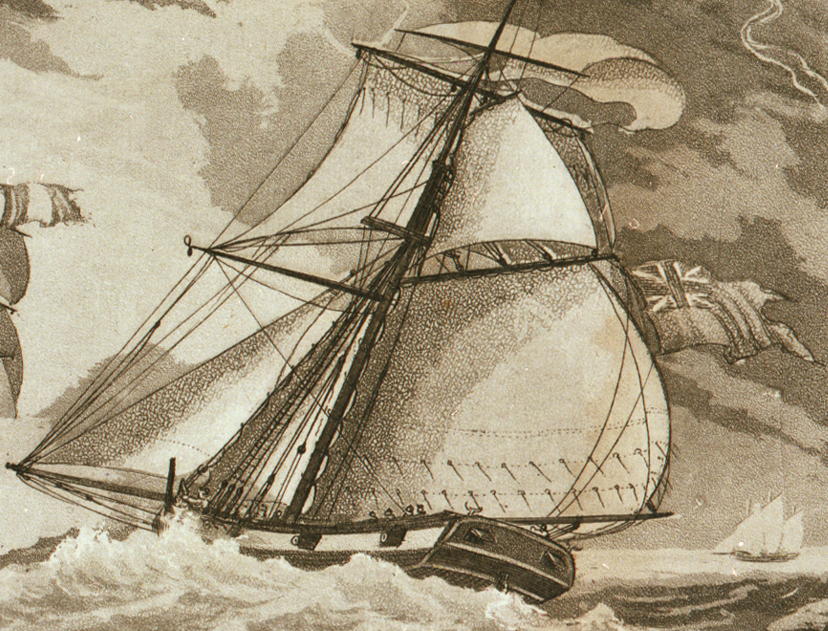
- Illustration of a Royal Navy cutter built to equivalent dimensions as Busy

History

Great Britain
- Name: HMS Busy
- Builder: Thomas Farley, Folkestone
- Launched: 1778
- Completed: 1 October 1778 at Deptford Dockyard
- Commissioned: July 1778–May 1783; May 1786–August 1786; March 1787–June1792
- Decommissioned: May 1783–May 1786; August 1786–March 1787
- Out of service: 20 August 1771
- Fate: Sold out of service, Portsmouth Dockyard, June 1792

General characteristics
- Class & type: 10-gun cutter
- Tons burthen: 188 (bm)
- Length: 73 ft 6 1/2 in (22.4 m) (overall); 53 ft 6 1/4 in (16.3 m) (keel)
- Beam: 25 ft 8 in (7.8 m)
- Depth of hold: 9 ft 7 in (2.9 m)
- Sail plan: fore-and-aft rig
- Complement: 55
- Armament: 10 × 4-pounder guns (prior to 1780); 12 × 4-pounder guns, 2 x 12-pounder carronades (1780–1792)

HMS Busy was a 12-gun single-masted cutter of the Royal Navy, purchased during the Fourth Anglo-Dutch War for coastal patrols in the English Channel and North Sea. In 1780 she was instrumental in the Royal Navy's recapture of HMS Jackal which had been in French control after a crew mutiny in the previous year. Present but not significantly involved in the 1781 Battle of Dogger Bank against a substantial Dutch fleet, Busy saw out her remaining years of service in coastal patrols off northern and eastern Scotland and in the Shetland Islands. In 1792, she was sold into private ownership at Portsmouth Dockyard for a sum of £130 (equivalent to £16,700 in 2025).

== Construction ==
Busy was one of 26 cutters purchased by the Royal Navy between 1777 and 1782 for coastal patrol and anti-privateer duties off English ports. Admiralty Orders for Busy's purchase were issued in early 1778 while she was still under construction at the private shipyard of Thomas Farley in Folkestone. Farley received an agreed fee of £3,294 (equivalent to £466,700 in 2025), and the completed vessel was launched in June 1778 and sailed to Deptford Dockyard to be fitted out, armed and supplied with crew.

She was a small craft, single-masted and measuring 188 tons burthen. As built, Busy had an overall length of 73 ft 6 1/2 in (22.4 m) including bowsprit, with a 53 ft 6 1/4 in (16.3 m) keel, a 25 ft 8 in (7.8 m) beam and a 9 ft 7 in (2.9 m) hold. She was initially armed with ten 4-pounder cannons ranged on either side of her deck, and crewed by a designated complement of 55 men.

== Naval service ==
=== Fourth Anglo-Dutch War ===
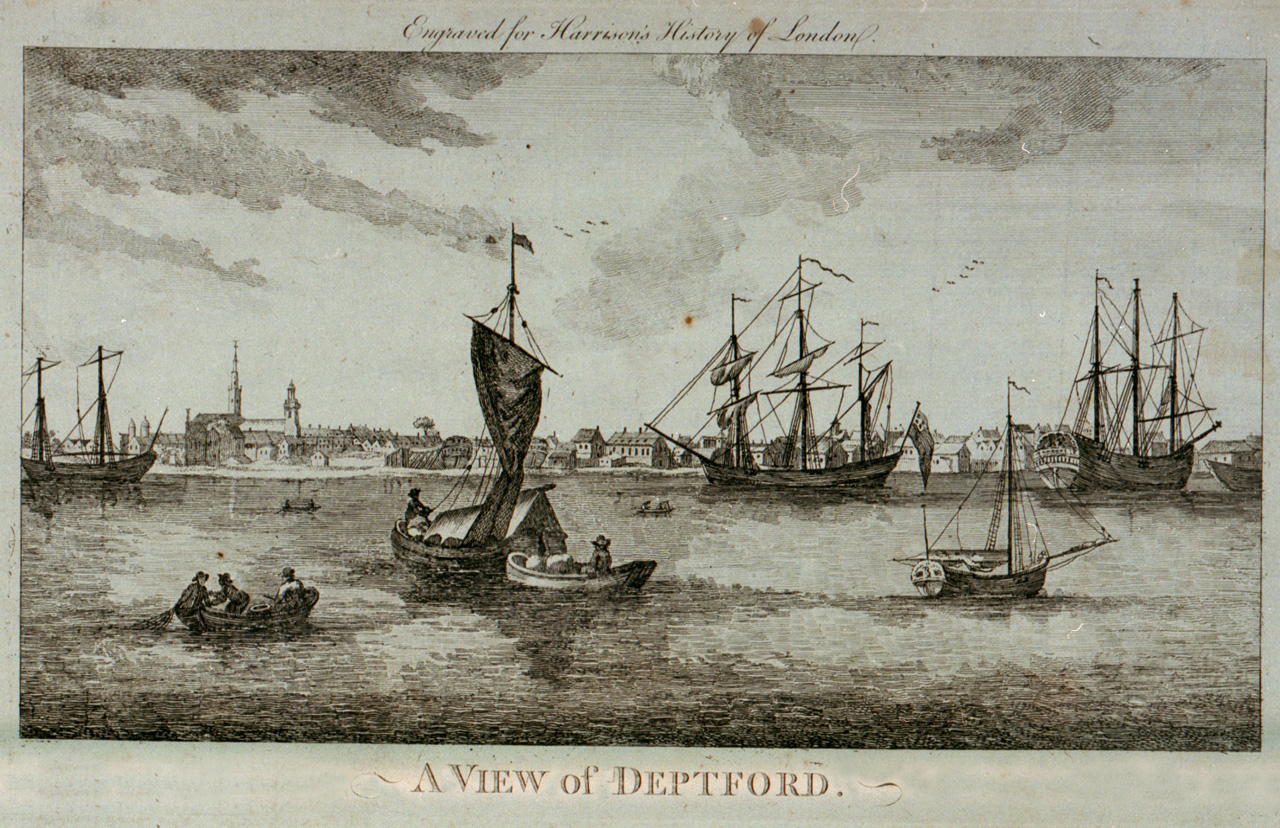
The waterfront at Deptford, where Busy was first commissioned in 1779

In July 1779, Busy was commissioned into service for the Fourth Anglo-Dutch War, while still fitting out and taking on crew at Deptford. Her first commander was Lieutenant James Cotes, whose orders were to use the cutter in support of Royal Navy vessels stationed in The Downs roadstead off the east coast of Kent.

On 18 May 1780 Busy was in company with HMS Lizard, a 24-gun sixth-rate frigate, when they encountered the former Royal Navy cutter HMS Jackal which had been lost to the French after her crew mutined in 1779. Jackal turned to escape, closely pursued by Busy. The two cutters exchanged several rounds of cannonfire, badly damaging each other's sails and causing injuries among their crews. The battle ended as Lizard drew close enough to train its guns on Jackal. The French crew were now confronted with a considerable inequality of firepower and chose to surrender rather than risk further combat. A number of Jackal's crew suffered minor wounds during the fight. However injuries were more severe aboard Busy: two men lost a leg each, while a third sailor had lost an arm and a fourth fractured his skull. Busy's commander Lieutenant Cotes, was publicly commended after the battle for his "gallant and spirited behaviour" in closely engaging the French-crewed vessel. Jackal herself was returned to Portsmouth as a prize, and her crew imprisoned in Edinburgh until they could be exchanged for English sailors held in France.

After this victory, Busy was sailed to Sheerness Dockyard. On arrival, she was removed from the water for copper sheathing to protect the hull from shipworm and barnacles. Her armament was also upgraded with the addition of two more 4-pounder cannons, and two 12-pounder carronades for use at close range. Command was also transferred from Cotes to Lieutenant William Furnivall. When sheathing and armament works concluded in September 1780, Furnivall returned Busy to her previous station in the Downs, and then onward to support Royal Navy convoy escorts in the North Sea.

On 5 August 1781, Busy was in contact with a British merchant convoy accompanied by seven ships of the line under Admiral Sir Hyde Parker when they engaged a Dutch fleet of equivalent size under Admiral Johan Zoutman in the Battle of Dogger Bank. Busy was too small and lightly armed to play an effective role in this engagement with much larger vessels. Instead, along with other smaller craft she was allocated to guard the British merchant convoy while the battle took place out of range. At the conclusion of the battle and with the British convoy unharmed, Busy resumed her North Sea patrols and fleet support role. She remained performing these functions at her North Sea station until May 1783 when she was decommissioned and her crew discharged to serve in other vessels.

=== Peacetime service ===
In September 1783, the Peace of Paris brought a provisional end to war between Britain and the Dutch and a reduction in demand for Royal Navy vessels to protect merchant convoys or support fleets in home waters. As a result, Busy was surplus to naval requirements and languished out of service for the next three years. She was restored to active duty in May 1786 under Lieutenant James Hills for a single three-month patrol off the east coast of Scotland. However, she was found to be in need for significant repair and was sailed to Chatham Dockyard in late 1786 for works costing £1,902 (equivalent to £258,300 in 2025), or more than half her original purchase price.

Restored to seaworthy condition by March 1787, Busy was recommissioned under Lieutenant John Elphinston for coastal patrol and convoy escort off northeastern Scotland. Elphinston relinquished command in 1789 and was replaced in the following year by Lieutenant Cuthbert Adamson. (Note: Father of John Adamson, an antiquary later decorated by Queen Maria II of Portugal for his services to Portuguese literature.) This would be Busy's last change of command. Under Adamson, she resumed her previous role patrolling the Scottish coast, until mid-1792 when she was sailed to Portsmouth Dockyard for permanent decommissioning. On 7 June 1792, after approximately ten years of active service, Busy was sold into private ownership at Portsmouth for £130 (equivalent to £16,700 in 2025).

== Bibliography ==
- Winfield, Rif (2007). British Warships of the Age of Sail 1714–1792: Design, Construction, Careers and Fates. Seaforth. ISBN 9781844157006.
