= Fleet action =

Type of naval engagement

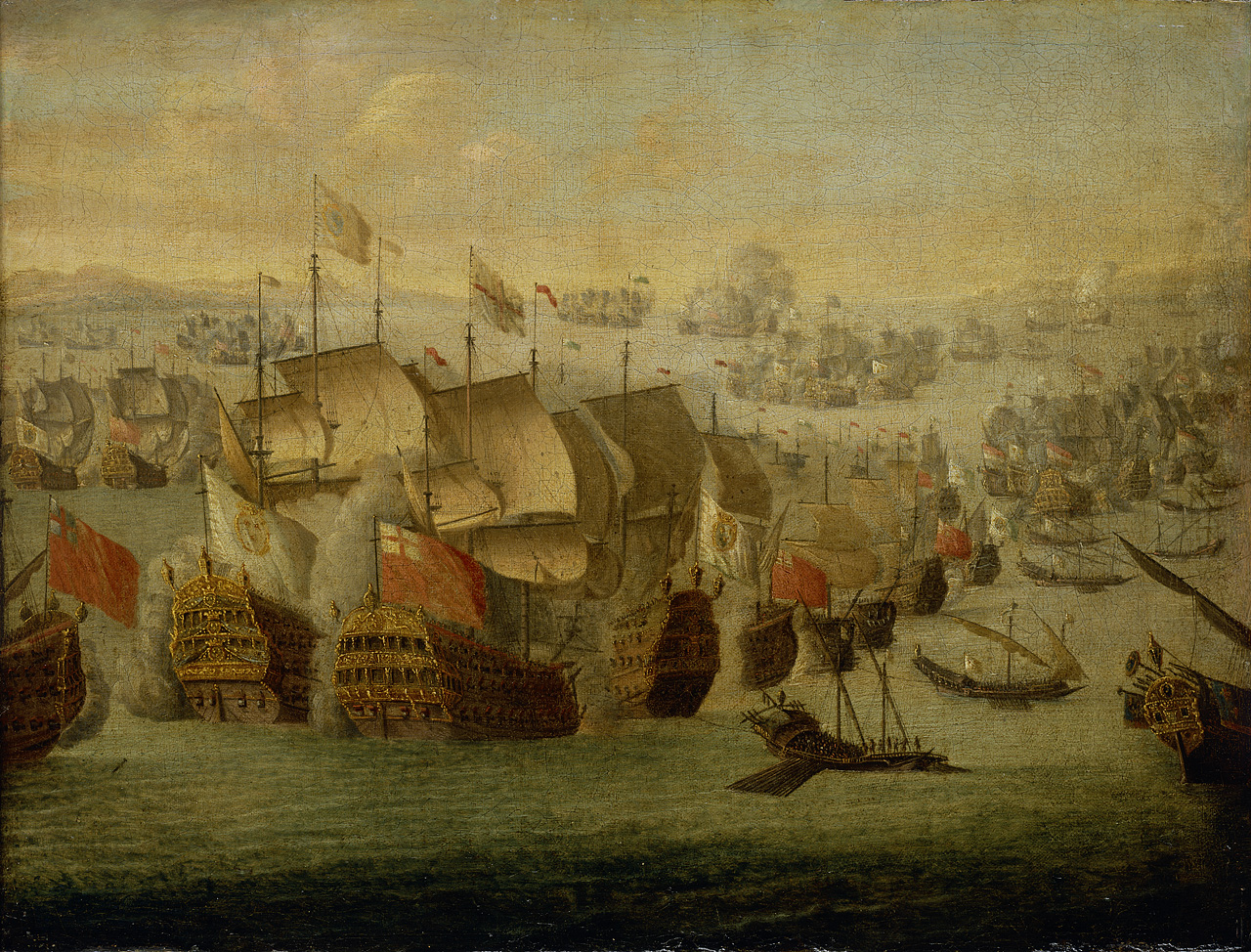
The Battle of Málaga, a 1704 fleet action of the War of the Spanish Succession

A fleet action is a naval engagement involving combat between forces that are larger than a squadron on either of the opposing sides. Fleet action is defined by combat and not just manoeuvring of the naval forces strategically, operationally or tactically without engaging. Most famous large naval battles in history were fleet actions. A fleet action is unrelated to participation of any formation that is a named naval fleet, and usually includes only major parts of such formations.

A general fleet action has been defined as one

aimed to destroy, incapacitate or capture the enemy's main body and thereby accomplish the principal strategic objective of the war at sea.

The Battle of Jutland, although consisting of several smaller battles and engagements, came closest to what was considered a general fleet action in the late "long" 19th century.

As an example of fleet action orders, the following were issued by Admiral Spruance commanding United States Fifth Fleet at 1415 on 17 June 1944:

Our air will first knock out enemy carriers, then will attack enemy battleships and cruisers to slow or disable them. Battle line will destroy enemy fleet either by fleet action if the enemy elects to fight or by sinking slowed or crippled ships if enemy retreats. Action against the enemy must be pushed vigorously by all hands to ensure complete destruction of his fleet. Destroyers running short of fuel may be returned to Saipan if necessary for refuelling.

In naval history a fleet action has usually been seen as not just another naval battle, but the decisive battle of a given theatre of war that brings about a drastic change in the naval balance of power. The Battle of Leyte Gulf is considered the last surface battle fleet action in history, and one in which the Allied forces nearly destroyed the entire Japanese fleet, which lost three battleships, all four aircraft carriers, six cruisers, and more than a dozen destroyers.

== See also ==
- List of naval battles
