= French corvette Robuste =

French slave ship and French and British later warship 1793–1802

History

France
- Name: Robuste
- Owner: Bouteiller (Père et fils)
- Builder: Nantes
- Launched: 1789
- Fate: Sold 1793

France
- Name: Robuste
- Owner: French Navy
- Acquired: December 1793
- Commissioned: Rochefort, Charente-Maritime
- Captured: 1796

Great Britain
- Name: HMS Scourge
- Acquired: 1796 by capture
- Fate: Sold 1802

General characteristics
- Type: Sloop
- Displacement: 542 tons (French)
- Tons burthen: 372 34/94 (bm)
- Length: 102 ft 9 in (31.3 m) (overall); 83 ft 5 in (25.4 m) (keel)
- Beam: 28 ft 11 5/8 in (8.8 m)
- Depth of hold: 12 ft 10 1/2 in (3.9 m)
- Sail plan: Sloop
- Complement: Slaver:39; French navy:106; At capture: 145; British service: 125
- Armament: Originally: 10 guns; At capture:22 guns; British service: 18 × 6-pounder guns; Later: 18 × 24-pounder carronades

The French corvette Robuste was a vessel built at Nantes in 1789 as a slaver that made her first and only slave-trading voyage in 1789–90. The French navy purchased her in December 1793 and she served as a 22-gun corvette in the Channel. The British captured her in 1796 and took her into the Royal Navy as HMS Scourge. She captured a number of French privateers, primarily in the West Indies, before the navy sold her in 1802.

== Slave voyage ==
Captain J.B. Magré sailed Robuste from Nantes on 10 May 1789, bound for West Africa. She arrived at Îles de Los on 6 October, where she gathered her slaves. She left on 21 July and sailed from the West Indies. She arrived at Les Cayes on 6 September, and sold her slaves there. She had embarked 339 slaves and disembarked 305, for a loss rate of 10%. She sailed from Les Cayes on 4 March 1790, and arrived home on 23 April.

== French naval service and capture ==
On 30 May 1795 Robuste was under the command of lieutenant de vaisseau Gautreau. She was operating between Lorient and Mindin. She had been escorting convoys between Verdon and the mouth of the Loire, and then returning to Lorient. Then between 11 May 1795 and 7 July, while under the command of lieutenant de vaisseau Arnous, she was escorting a convoy from Lorient to the Raz de Sein.

On 16 April 1796, while in the Bay of Audierne, she encountered HMS Pomone. Pomone captured Robuste, of 22 guns and 145 men, off Penmarch Point. Robuste was sailing from Brest to L'Orient. The Royal Navy took her into service as Scourge. Prize money for Robuste was paid in December 1796.

== Royal Navy career ==
The Royal Navy commissioned Scourge in August 1796 under Commander Henry Richard Glynn.

On 12 February 1797 Phoenix was in company with Triton and Scourge off the Irish coast. Together they captured the French privateer Difficile. She was armed with 18 guns and had a crew of 206 men. She was three days out of Brest; Phoenix put a prize crew aboard and sent her into Portsmouth. The same three ships also captured Jeune Emilie and Recovery, though they shared the capture of Recovery with HMS Unite, and HMS Stag.

Scourge's next capture occurred a few days later, on 21 February. Scourge chased a French privateer for three hours before catching up with her five or six leagues off the coast. The privateer was Furet, pierced for 14 guns. She had 10 mounted; the other four were in her hold. She also had a crew of 50 men, as well as 22 English prisoners, seven of whom were wounded. Under the command of Benoish Giron she was 20 days out of Lorient. Glynn described Furet as being coppered and a fast sailer.

Commander Samuel Warren replaced Glynn and sailed Scourge to the Leeward Islands on 7 June.

On 28 September Scourge captured the French privateer schooner Sarazine off Marie-Galante. Sarazine, of Guadaloupe, was armed with six guns and had a crew of 58 men; Warren sent them into Port Royal, Martinique. Sarazine had been out 10 days but had not captured anything.

Next, Scourge detained on 4 December the schooner Amazon, of 90 tons (bm), which had been sailing with provisions from Baltimore to Surinam. The capture took place too windward of Dominique and Scourge sent Amazon into Saint Pierre, Martinique. Amazon had been a prize to the French privateer Hannibal.

On 23 January 1798, Scourge captured Neustra Segniora de la Providentia; the vessel and cargo were condemned at Tortola. Two weeks later, on 8 February, Scourge and Roebuck captured the schooner Betsey, which too was condemned at Tortola.

Scourge and Aimable captured the French privateer Triomphe (Triumph) on 6 April. Two days later they captured the French privateer Chasseur. Both captures took place off Porto Rico. Triomphe was a brig of 14 guns and 88 men; Chasseur was a schooner of two guns and 18 men.

On 1 May Scourge chased a French 14-gun privateer brig on shore at St. Martin's. The privateer's crew escaped after setting fire to the brig, which blew up before boats from Scourge could reach it.

On 20 January 1799, Scourge captured a Spanish brig from Cadiz bound to La Guira with a cargo of wine, brandy, and merchandise. Scourge brought the prize into Trinidad.

In early to mid-July July 1800 Scourge, which had been out in the West Indies since 13 April 1997, returned to Great Britain as part of the escort of the about 91 sail of the West India fleet. On 20 August, she passed up the Bristol Channel with 11 vessels out of a convoy of 41 vessels that Invincible was taking to the Thames, the rest of the vessels being destined for Liverpool and Glasgow. Scourge arrived at Portsmouth two days later.

On 14 September Scourge was paid off, and her crew turned over to Ganges.

== Fate ==
The Commissioners of the Navy offered Scourge for sale at Portsmouth on 11 August 1802. She sold that month.

Her hull was offered for sale at North Shields on 2 November.
