= Johan Zoutman =

Dutch rear-admiral

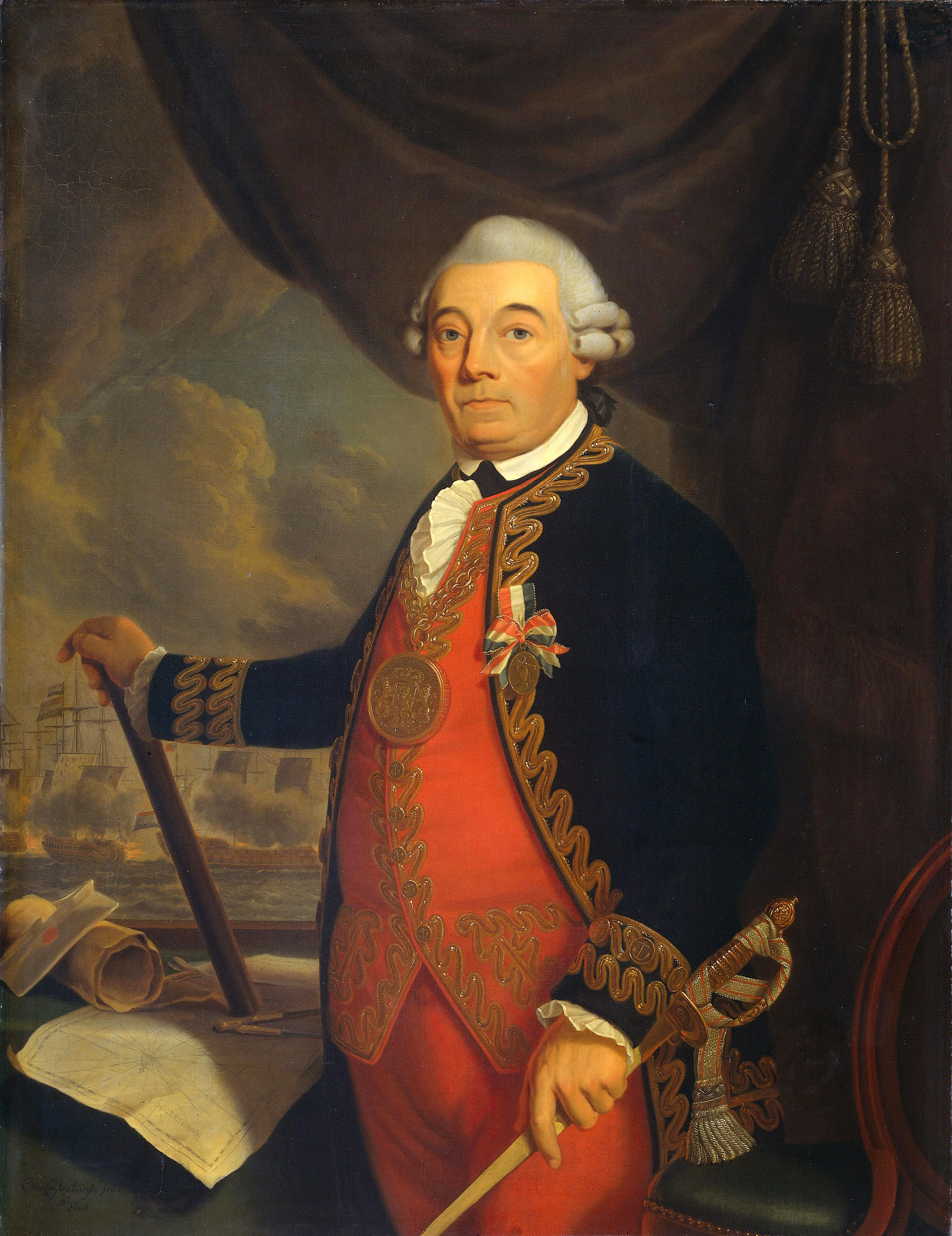
- Portrait of Zoutman by Cornelis van Cuylenburg
- Born: May 10, 1724; Reeuwijk, Dutch Republic
- Died: May 7, 1793 (aged 68); The Hague, Dutch Republic
- Allegiance: Dutch Republic
- Service / branch: Dutch States Navy
- Rank: Schout-bij-nacht
- Battles / wars: Fourth Anglo-Dutch War; Battle of Dogger Bank

Schout-bij-nacht Johan Arnold Zoutman (10 May 1724 – 7 May 1793) was a Dutch States Navy officer, politician and surveyor who served in the Fourth Anglo-Dutch War. He is best known for commanding the Dutch fleet at the 1781 Battle of Dogger Bank.

== Legacy ==
In 1798, Fort Zoutman was built in his name at Oranjestad and is the oldest Dutch structure on the island of Aruba. The Willem III Tower was built at the west entrance of the fort in 1868 and has functioned as a clock tower, lighthouse and a station for the Aruba Police Force. The fort now houses the Aruba Historical Museum.

== Gallery ==
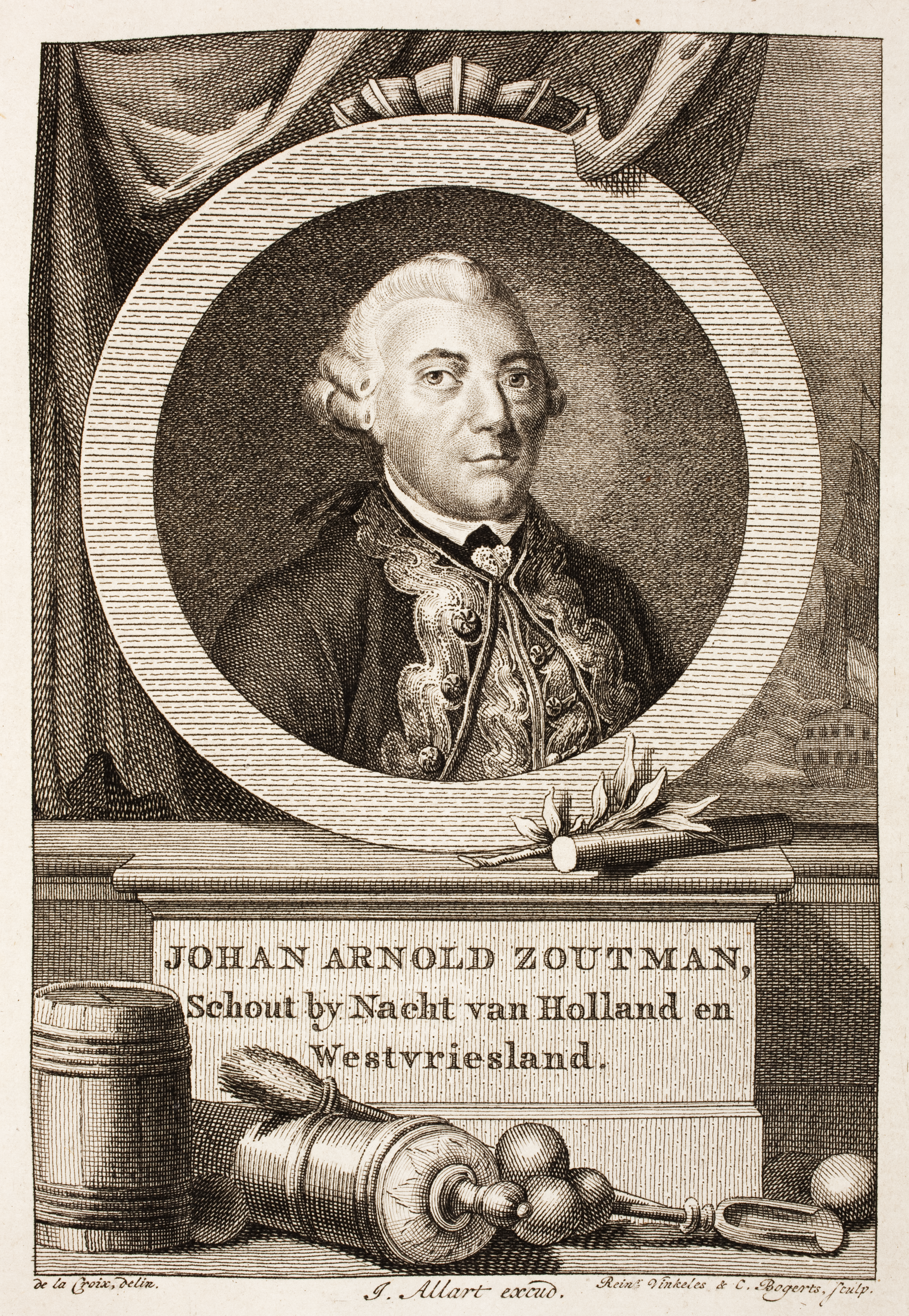
Johan Zoutman

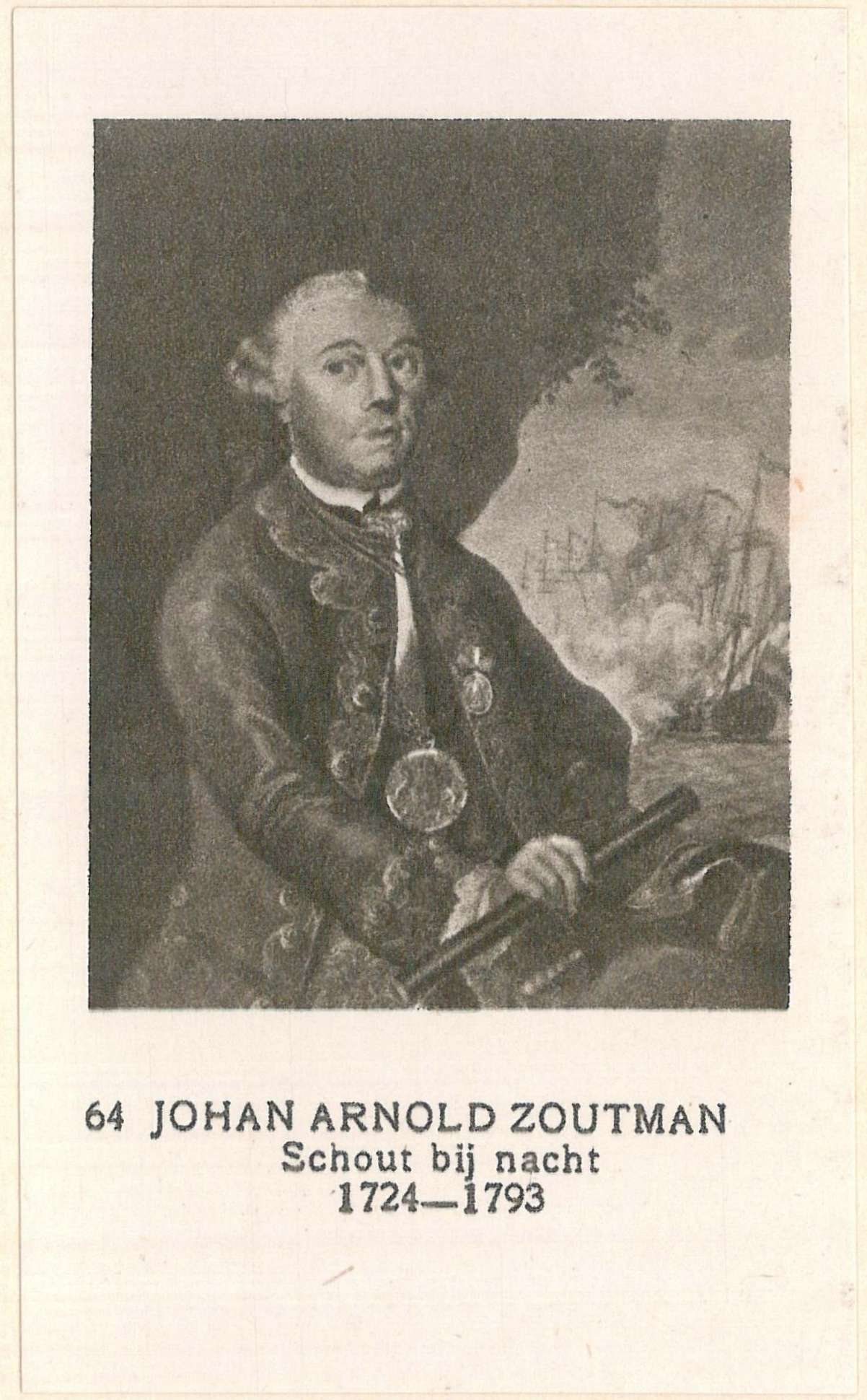
Johan Zoutman, Schout-bij-nacht

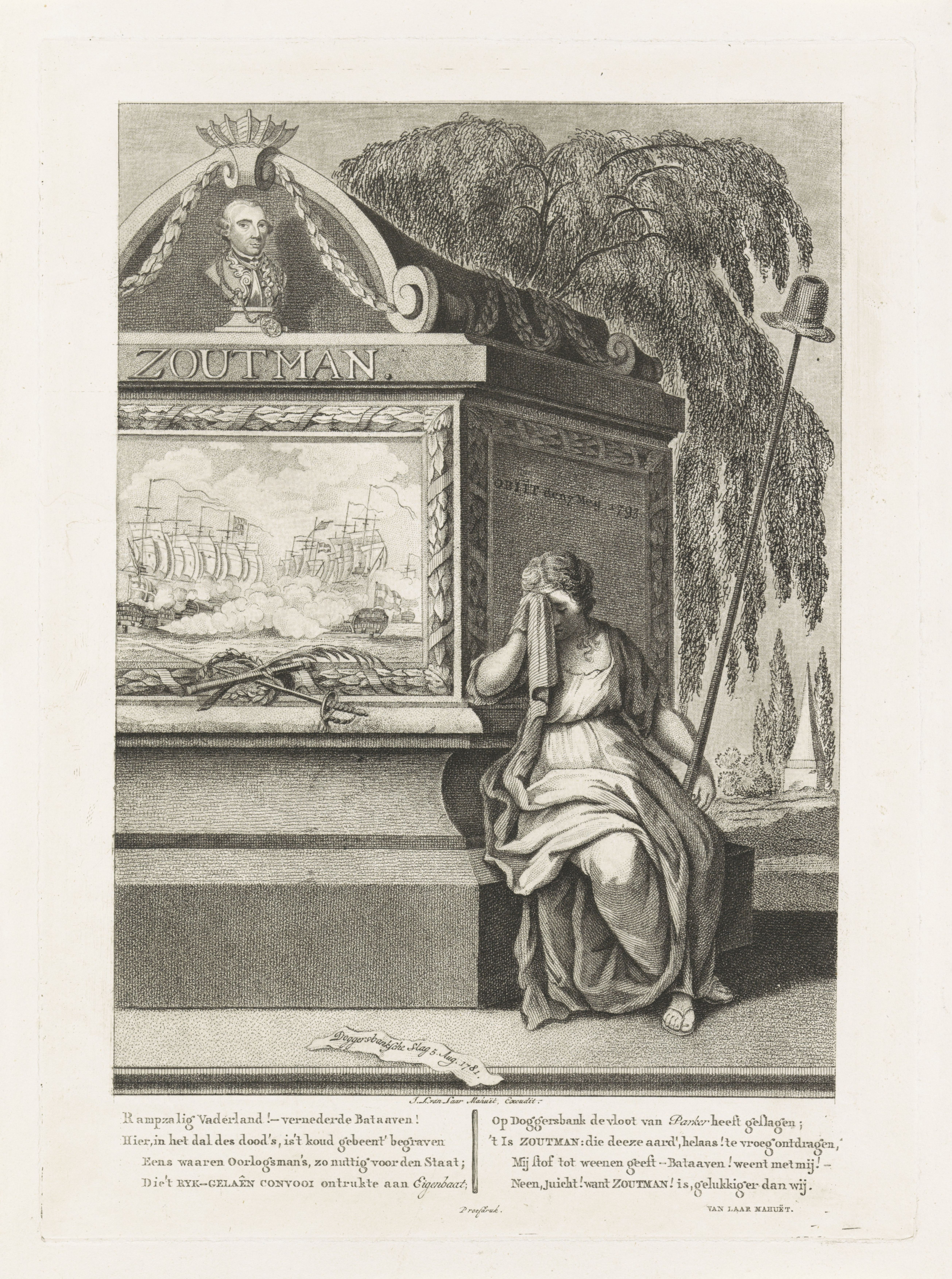
Allegory of Zoutman's death
