= HMS Captain (1743) =

Ship of the line of the Royal Navy

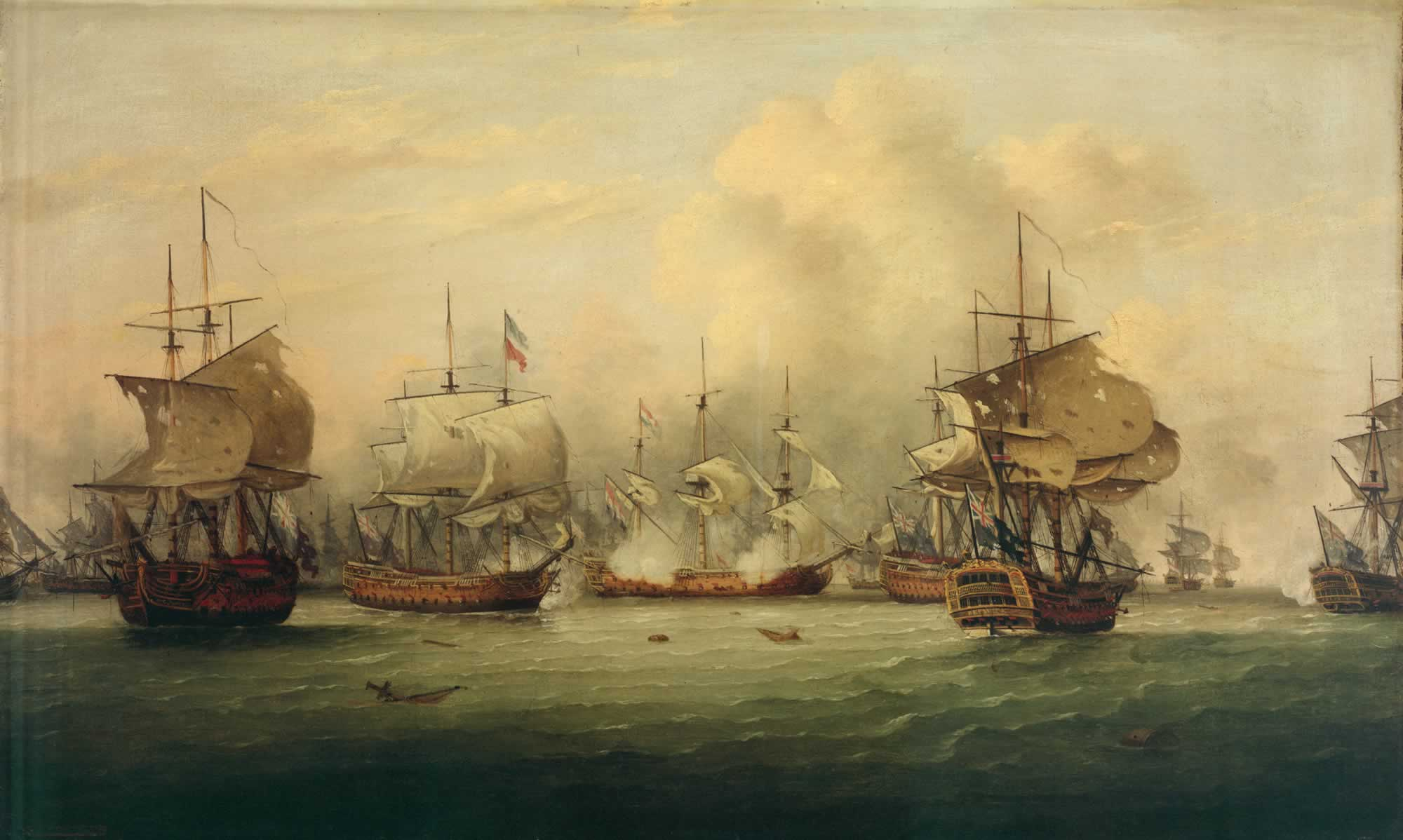

History

Great Britain
- Name: HMS Captain
- Ordered: 7 September 1739
- Builder: Woolwich Dockyard
- Launched: 14 April 1743
- Fate: Broken up, 1783
- Notes: Present for: Boston Tea Party; Participated in: Battle of Dogger Bank

General characteristics
- Class & type: 1733 proposals 70-gun third rate ship of the line
- Tons burthen: 1230 (bm)
- Length: 151 ft (46.0 m) (gundeck)
- Beam: 43 ft 5 in (13.2 m)
- Depth of hold: 17 ft 9 in (5.4 m)
- Propulsion: Sails
- Sail plan: Full-rigged ship
- Armament: Gundeck: 26 × 24-pounder guns; Upper gundeck: 26 × 12-pounder guns; QD: 14 × 6-pounder guns; Fc: 4 × 6-pounder guns

HMS Captain was a 70-gun third-rate ship of the line of the Royal Navy, built according to the 1733 proposals of the 1719 Establishment at Woolwich Dockyard, and launched on 14 April 1743.

Francis Light, founder of Penang, served for a few months as an apprentice on Captain around 1759.

In 1760, the Captain was reduced to a 64-gun ship.

On 12 August 1771, the Captain entered Boston Harbor with John Montagu, Rear-Admiral of the Blue Squadron and newly appointed Commander-in-Chief of the North American Station. She served as Montagu's flagship while he oversaw the Royal Navy's protection of trade and support of Revenue and customs enforcement under the Townshend Acts.

The Captain was present in Boston Harbor—along with the Active and Kingfisher—on 16 December 1773, when the Boston Tea Party took place. The ships were readied for action, and "it was expected that the men of war would have interfered" to prevent the destruction of the tea, but according to Admiral Montagu the civil leadership never called for his assistance. He claimed that if they had, he could have easily prevented the tea's destruction, "but must have endangered the Lives of many innocent people by firing upon the town", presumably with the guns of the Captain.

In 1777 the Captain was converted to serve as a storeship and renamed Buffalo.

In March, 1778 she was under command of Commander Hugh Bromage.

Although a storeship, Buffalo shared, with Thetis, and Alarm, in the proceeds from Southampton's capture of the 12-gun French privateer Comte de Maurepas, on 3 August 1780.

In 1781, with 60 guns back on board, although she only had 18-pounders on the lower deck, she participated in the Fourth Anglo-Dutch War at the Battle of Dogger Bank.

Buffalo returned to the role of storeship until she was broken up in 1783.
