= HMS Princess Amelia (1757) =

Ship of the line of the Royal Navy

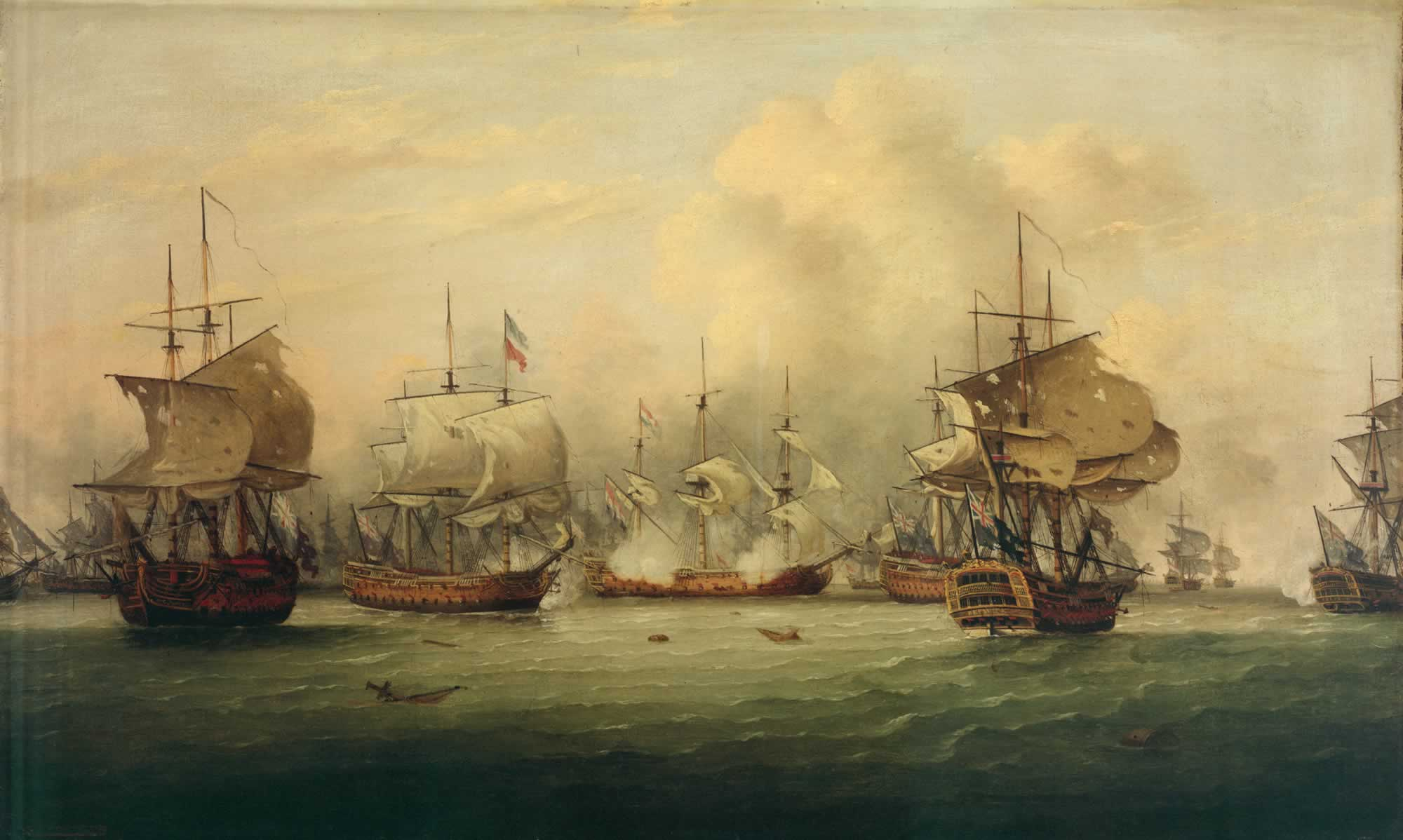
- battle of Dogger Bank 1781

History

Great Britain
- Name: HMS Norfolk
- Ordered: 25 April 1751
- Builder: Woolwich Dockyard, M/Shipwright Thomas Fellowes, followed by Thomas Slade, Adam Hayes, Edward Allin, and Israel Pownoll
- Launched: 7 March 1757
- Renamed: HMS Princess Amelia on 1 November 1755
- Fate: Sold, 1818
- Notes: Participated in: Battle of Dogger Bank

General characteristics
- Class & type: 1745 Establishment 80-gun third rate ship of the line
- Tons burthen: 1579 39/94 (bm)
- Length: 165 ft 0 in (50.3 m) (gundeck); 133 ft 0 in (40.5 m) (keel)
- Beam: 47 ft 3 in (14.4 m)
- Depth of hold: 20 ft 0 in (6.1 m)
- Propulsion: Sails
- Sail plan: Full-rigged ship
- Complement: 650
- Armament: Gundeck: 26 × 32-pounder guns; Middle gundeck: 26 × 18-pounder guns; Upper gundeck: 24 × 9-pounder guns; QD: Nil; Fc: 4 × 6-pounder guns

HMS Princess Amelia was an 80-gun third rate ship of the line of the Royal Navy, designed by Sir Joseph Allin and built at Woolwich Dockyard by Israel Pownoll to the draught specified by the 1745 Establishment, and launched on 7 March 1757.

== History ==
She participated in the 1781 Battle of Dogger Bank under the command of Captain Macartney with reduced masts and guns.

In June 1773 the Amelia sailed to Florida and then Newfoundland before returning to England in August 1773. During the voyage, Cuthbert Collingwood served as midshipman on board.

Princess Amelia was lent to the Board of Customs in November 1788, and thereby deleted from the Navy List. She arrived at Sheerness on 24 March 1818 from Stangate Creek. The Admiralty then sold her on 11 June 1818 to a Mr. Snooks for £2,610.
