= Dutch ship Batavier (1779) =

Ship of the line of the Dutch States Navy

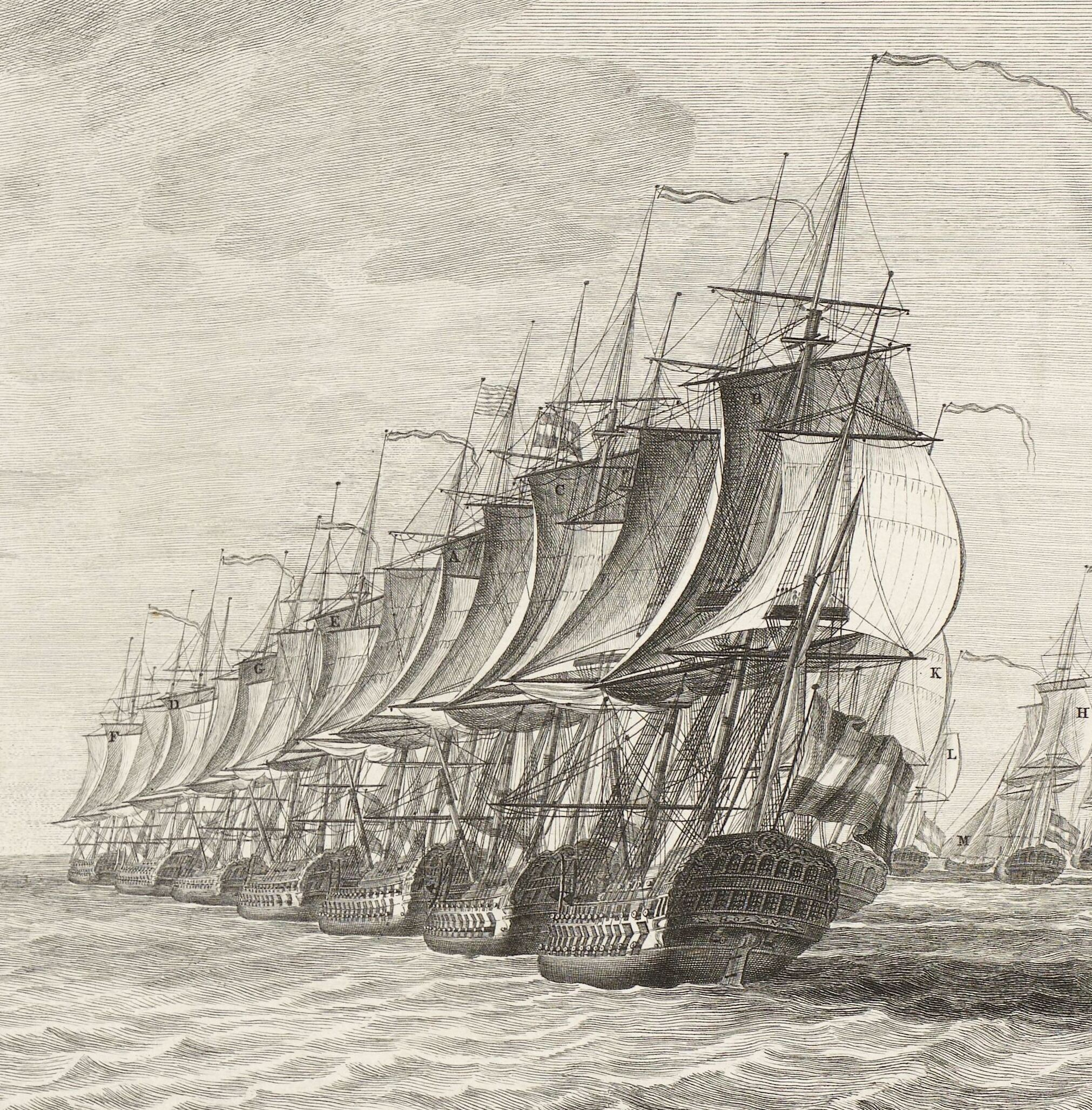
- Batavier (E) at the Battle of Dogger Bank

History

Dutch Republic
- Name: Batavier
- Laid down: 8 September 1777
- Launched: 18 February 1779
- Commissioned: 1780

Batavian Republic
- Name: Batavier
- Captured: By the Royal Navy in 1799

Great Britain
- Name: HMS Batavier
- Acquired: 30 August 1799
- Commissioned: 1799
- Out of service: 1823
- Reclassified: Floating battery after 1801; Hospital ship between 1809 and 1817; Prison ship between 1817 and 1823
- Fate: Broken up in 1823

General characteristics in Dutch service
- Class & type: 50-gun ship of the Third Charter; ship of the line
- Length: 143 ft 0 in (43.6 m) (gundeck); in Amsterdam feet this equalled 154½
- Beam: 39 ft 11 in (12.2 m); in Amsterdam feet this equalled 43
- Depth of hold: 18 ft 6 in (5.6 m); in Amsterdam feet this equalled 20
- Propulsion: Sails
- Sail plan: Full-rigged ship
- Armament: 50 guns of varying sizes

General characteristics in British service
- Class & type: 56-gun third rate; ship of the line
- Tons burthen: 1,047 87/94 (bm)
- Length: 144 ft 7 in (44.1 m) (gundeck); 118 ft 7 in (36.1 m) (keel)
- Beam: 40 ft 10 in (12.4 m)
- Depth of hold: 16 ft 5 in (5.0 m)
- Propulsion: Sails
- Sail plan: Full-rigged ship
- Armament: As originally fitted at Chatham; Lower gundeck: 22 × 24-pounder guns; Upper gundeck: 24 × 12-pounder guns; Quarterdeck and forecastle: 8 × 6-pounder guns; After rearmament; 20 × 24-pounder guns; 20 × 18-pounder guns; Subsequently added; Quarterdeck: 6 × 6-pounder guns; Forecastle: 2 × 6-pounder guns

Batavier was a 56-gun ship of the line of the Dutch States Navy. Launched in 1779, she was organisationally part of the Admiralty of Amsterdam and served at the Battle of Dogger Bank during the Fourth Anglo-Dutch War. In 1795 Batavier became part of the new Batavian Navy, and on 30 August 1799 was captured by British forces during the Vlieter incident of the Anglo-Russian invasion of Holland. The Royal Navy brought her to England and commissioned the vessel as HMS Batavier in 1801. She was used in various subsidiary roles until being broken up in 1823.

== Dutch career and capture ==
The order to construct the ship was given by the Admiralty of Amsterdam. The ship was laid down on 8 September 1777, launched on 18 February 1779 and commissioned in 1780. On 5 August 1781, Batavier took part in the Battle of Dogger Bank under Captain Wolter Jan Gerrit Bentinck. Batavier sailed in the middle of the Dutch line, between the ships Admiraal de Ruyter and Argo. She was engaged by three British ships, and became unmanageable after a fire broke out. The battle, while indecisive tactically, resulted in a strategic British victory and afterwards Batavier was towed to Texel. Bentinck later died wounds he received in the battle.

In 1795, following the French occupation of the Netherlands during the French Revolutionary Wars, the ship was commissioned in the Batavian Navy. On 11 October 1797 Batavier took part in the Battle of Camperdown under Captain Jan Jacob Souter. Early in the battle, the ship was under heavy fire, but soon she drifted off, and she eventually left the scene and fled to Texel. On 30 August 1799 the ship was surrendered to a British fleet under Vice-Admiral Andrew Mitchell during the Vlieter incident, even though Batavier was the only ship of the Dutch fleet where no mutiny had broken out.

== Royal Navy career ==
Batavier was sailed to Britain and underwent refitting at Chatham Dockyard between 14 July 1800 and 15 July 1801 for use as a floating battery. She was officially established in February 1801 and was commissioned in June 1801 as HMS Batavier under Captain William Robert Broughton for service in the English Channel. Broughton was succeeded in April 1803 by Captain Patrick Tonyn, and in August 1804 she was laid up at Chatham. She was moved to Woolwich Dockyard in April 1809, where she functioned as a hospital ship under the command of Lieutenant Thomas Dorsett Birchall. This service lasted until January 1817, after which she was moved to Blackwall to receive distressed seamen. Her final service was to be fitted out at Woolwich as a prison ship. She was based at Sheerness from September 1817, and was finally broken up there in March 1823.
