= HMS Fortitude (1780) =

Ship of the line of the Royal Navy

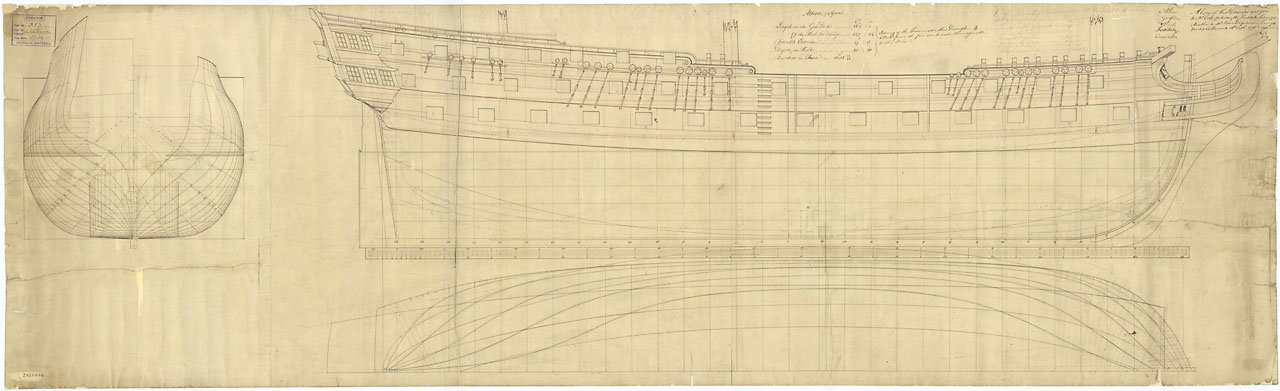
- Fortitude

History

Great Britain
- Name: HMS Fortitude
- Ordered: 2 February 1778
- Builder: Randall, Rotherhithe
- Laid down: 4 March 1778
- Launched: 23 March 1780
- Honours and awards: Participated in: Battle of Dogger Bank
- Fate: Broken up, 1820

General characteristics
- Class & type: Albion-class ship of the line
- Tons burthen: 1645 bm
- Length: 168 ft (51 m) (gundeck)
- Depth of hold: 18 ft 10 in (5.74 m)
- Propulsion: Sails
- Sail plan: Full-rigged ship
- Armament: 74 guns: Gundeck: 28 × 32-pounder guns; Upper gundeck: 28 × 18-pounder guns; Quarterdeck: 14 × 9-pounder guns; Forecastle: 4 × 9-pounder guns

HMS Fortitude was a 74-gun third-rate ship of the line of the Royal Navy, built by John Randall & Co. and launched on 23 March 1780 at Rotherhithe.

== American War of Independence ==
Under Captain Richard Bickerton, Fortitude served in the English Channel. In April 1781 she participated in the second relief of Gibraltar. In May 1781, during the Fourth Anglo–Dutch War, Vice-Admiral of the Blue Sir Hyde Parker shifted his flag from HMS Victory to Fortitude. On 5 August, Fortitude fought in the Battle of Dogger Bank as Parker's flagship. After a desperate, bloody battle in which neither combatant gained any advantage, both sides drew off.

== French Revolutionary Wars ==
In 1793, under Captain William Young she sailed for the Mediterranean to join Admiral Sir Samuel Hood's fleet there.

On 7 February 1794 Fortitude, under the command of Captain William Young, and Juno attacked a tower at Mortella Point, on the coast of Corsica. The tower, though manned by only 33 men and heavily damaged by the ships' guns, held out for two days before surrendering to land-based forces under Sir John Moore, having lost two men mortally wounded. In her unsuccessful bombardment, Fortitude suffered extensive damage to her hull, masts, rigging and sails, particularly from heated shot, and had three lower-deck guns disabled. In all, she lost six men killed and 56 men wounded, including eight dangerously. The design of the tower so impressed the British that they made it the model for Martello Towers that they would later construct in Great Britain and many of their colonies.

Under Captain Thomas Taylor Fortitude was involved in actions off Genoa on 13 March 1795, and Hyères on 13 July 1795. The action on 13 March resulted in Admiral William Hotham's Mediterranean Fleet chasing the French fleet and capturing Ça Ira and Censeur, with the two fleets then sailing off in opposite directions. The action on 13 July was also indecisive, though the British captured a French 74-gun ship. Admiral Hotham resigned on 1 November 1795.

On 25 September 1795, Fortitude set sail for Britain with a large convoy. The convoy had over 60 merchant ships, as well as the Censeur. On 7 October 1795 the convoy sighted a large French squadron with six ships of the line, off Cape St. Vincent, which sailed in pursuit of them. Before the French arrived, Censeur lost her fore topmast and had only a frigate's main mast left, rendering her useless. She was also lightly manned and short of powder. In the subsequent exchange the French recaptured Censeur, along with 33 merchant ships of the convoy. The rest continued on to England.

== Fate ==
Fortitude served as a prison ship from 1795 and as a powder hulk at Portsmouth from 1802. She was broken up there in 1820.
