= Schout-bij-nacht =

Naval rank of Dutch origin

Schout-bij-nacht (pronounced [ˈsxʌud bɛi ˈnɑxt]) is a naval rank of Dutch origin.

The schout-bij-nacht was responsible for ensuring that a fleet continued to sail in the prescribed order at night. The title comes from the title of the officer who replaced the admiral at night, from the Middle Low German schulthete meaning commanding official, cognate to the modern German Schultheiß, and was therefore called night commander, captain at night or schout-bij-nacht.

== Denmark–Norway ==
In the Dano-Norwegian navy, the rank of schout by nacht was codified on 11 February 1693, by King Christian V. In the second publication of the Danish order of precedence, the rank of schout by nacht was placed below vice admirals (Danish: vice-admiral), and above commander-captains (Commandeur-Capitainer til Søes). In 1771, the rank was replaced with counter admiral.

== Netherlands ==
Schout-bij-nacht

- Sleeve insignia
- Country: Netherlands
- Service branch: Royal Netherlands Navy
- Rank group: Flag officer
- NATO rank code: OF-7
- Formation: 15th century
- Next higher rank: Vice admiral
- Next lower rank: Commander
- Equivalent ranks: Major general

It is the second most junior admiral position of the Dutch Navy, ranking above commandeur ("commodore") and below a vice-admiraal ("vice admiral").

The rank is rated OF-7 within the NATO rank structure, usually equivalent counter admiral, and rear admiral.

== Russia ==
In the Imperial Russian Navy the rank of Schout-bij-nacht (Russian: шаутбенахт, romanized: shautbenakht) was kept until 1732, when the rank was replaced with counter admiral (контр-адмирал, kontr-admiral).

== Sweden ==
Schoutbynacht was a rank used in the Swedish Navy from 1630 to 1771. It was then replaced by the rank of Konteramiral.

== See also ==
- Counter admiral
