= List of ship launches in 1761 =

The list of ship launches in 1761 includes a chronological list of some ships launched in 1761.

Date	Ship	Class	Builder	Location	Country	Notes
22 January	Arrogant	Arrogant-class ship of the line	John Barnard & John Turner	Harwich Dockyard	Great Britain	For Royal Navy.
3 February	Beaver	Beaver-class sloop	Robert Inwood	Rotherhithe	Great Britain	For Royal Navy.
4 February	Royal Captain	East Indiaman	John Randall	Rotherhithe	Great Britain	For Sir Richard Hotham.
7 February	Martin	Sloop of war	John Randall	Rotherhithe	Great Britain	For Royal Navy.
24 February	Druid	Druid-class sloop	John Barnard	Harwich	Great Britain	For Royal Navy.
11 March	Lynx	Druid-class sloop	Wells Stanton	Rotherhithe	Great Britain	For Royal Navy.
16 March	Hardman	Merchantman		Manchester	Great Britain	For private owner.
26 March	Buon Consiglio	Leon Trionfante-class ship of the line		Venice	Republic of Venice	For Venetian Navy.
21 April	Ocean	Sandwich-class ship of the line	John Lock	Chatham Dockyard	Great Britain	For Royal Navy.
6 May	Mermaid	Mermaid-class frigate	Hugh Blaydes	Hull	Great Britain	For Royal Navy.
19 May	Cornwall	Arrogant-class ship of the line	Wells	Deptford	Great Britain	For Royal Navy.
5 June	Lowestoffe	Fifth rate	Thomas West	Deptford Dockyard	Great Britain	For Royal Navy.
5 July	Blenheim	Sandwich-class ship of the line	Israel Pownoll	Woolwich Dockyard	Great Britain	For Royal Navy.
1 August	Africa	Essex-class ship of the line	Perry	Blackwall Yard	Great Britain	For Royal Navy.
8 August	Sagittaire	Fourth rate	Joseph-Marie-Blaise Coulomb	Toulon	Kingdom of France	For French Navy.
15 September	Montreal	Niger-class frigate	Joseph Harris	Sheerness Dockyard	Great Britain	For Royal Navy.
14 December	Britannia	East Indiaman	John Randall	location	Great Britain	For British East India Company.
16 December	Andaluz	Xebec		Cádiz	Spain	For Spanish Navy.
Unknown date	Carnac	Schooner		Bombay	India	For Bombay Pilot Service.
Unknown date	Earl of Ashburnham	East Indiaman	John Wells	Deptford	Great Britain	For British East India Company.
Unknown date	Erfprins van Brunswijk	Fifth rate		Vlissingen	Dutch Republic	For Dutch Navy.
Unknown date	Grosvenor	East Indiaman	John Wells	Deptford	Great Britain	For British East India Company.
Unknown date	Holland	Third rate	John May	Amsterdam	Dutch Republic	For Dutch Navy.
Unknown date	Huron	Schooner		Navy Island Royal Naval Shipyard	New France	For Royal Navy.
Unknown date	Kennemerland	Fourth rate	Peter Edwards	Amsterdam	Dutch Republic	For Dutch Navy.
Unknown date	Adelaide	Coquette-class gunboat	Chevallier Antoine Groignard	Lorient	Kingdom of France	For French Navy.
Unknown date	Agaçante	Coquette-class gunboat	Chevallier Antoine Groignard	Lorient	Kingdom of France	For French Navy.
Unknown date	Badine	Gunboat	Chevallier Antoine Groignard	Lorient	Kingdom of France	For French Navy.
Unknown date	Capricieuse	Gunboat	Chevallier Antoine Groignard	Lorient	Kingdom of France	For French Navy.
Unknown date	Fantasque	Coquette-class gunboat	Chevallier Antoine Groignard	Lorient	Kingdom of France	For French Navy.
Unknown date	Fidèle	Coquette-class gunboat	Chevallier Antoine Groignard	Lorient	Kingdom of France	For French Navy.
Unknown date	Fringante	Coquette-class gunboat	Chevallier Antoine Groignard	Lorient	Kingdom of France	For French Navy.
Unknown date	Melanide	Coquette-class gunboat	Chevallier Antoine Groignard	Lorient	Kingdom of France	For French Navy.
Unknown date	Parfaite	Coquette-class gunboat	Chevallier Antoine Groignard	Lorient	Kingdom of France	For French Navy.
Unknown date	Pimpante	Coquette-class gunboat	Chevallier Antoine Groignard	Lorient	Kingdom of France	For French Navy.
Unknown date	Reine du Maroc	Coquette-class gunboat	Chevallier Antoine Groignard	Lorient	Kingdom of France	For French Navy.
Unknown date	Le Duc de Choiseul	Bertin-class East Indiaman		Loriend	Kingdom of France	For Compagnie des Indes.
Unknown date	Meermin	Hoeker		Amsterdam	Dutch Republic	For Dutch East India Company.
Unknown date	Morning Star	Cutter			Great Britain	For Private owner.
Unknown date	Prinses Maria-Louisa	Fourth rate	Willem Lodewijk	Harlingen	Dutch Republic	For Dutch Navy.
Unknown date	Rotterdam	Fourth rate		Rotterdam	Dutch Republic	For Dutch Navy.
Unknown date	Royal Charlotte	East Indiaman			Great Britain	For British East India Company.
Unknown date	Santa Ana	Fifth rate		Daman	(Portugal) Portuguese India	For Portuguese Navy.
Unknown date	Triton	Schooner			Thirteen Colonies	For private owner.
Unknown date	True Briton	East Indiaman			Great Britain	For British East India Company.
Unknown date	Name unknown	West Indiaman		Havana	(Spain) Cuba	For private owner.
