= Action of 29 July 1782 =

- Part of the American Revolutionary War
- The capture of the 'Amazone' by HM ship 'Santa Margarita', 29 July 1782; Robert Dodd, c. 1783
Date	29–30 July 1782
Location	Off Cape Henry, Atlantic Ocean
Result	Inconclusive

Belligerents
Great Britain	France

Commanders and leaders
Elliot Salter	Louis-Charles de Montguyot de Cambronne †; Louis-Philippe de Vaudreuil

Strength
1 frigate	1 frigate 13 ships (under Vaudreuil)

Casualties and losses
5 killed 17 wounded	70 killed 80 wounded

The action of 29 July 1782 took place during the end of the American War of Independence. The Royal Navy frigate HMS Santa Margarita captured the French Navy frigate French frigate Amazone off Cape Henry, but on the next day a French squadron under Louis-Philippe de Vaudreuil intervened and recaptured Amazone.

== Background ==
HMS Santa Margarita had previously been a Spanish-built frigate of 36 guns that had been captured in 1779 by the Royal Navy off Lisbon. She was then commissioned in March 1781 - with 255 men under Captain Elliot Salter, who sailed her to North America where she formed part of George Johnstone's squadron in June 1781.

On 29 July 1782 off Cape Henry at the entrance to Chesapeake Bay, Salter came in sight of eight large warships out of thirteen under French Admiral Louis-Philippe de Vaudreuil. Vaudreuil having saved most of the French Navy's ships in the disastrous defeat at the Battle of the Saintes in the Caribbean Sea three months before, took command of French fleet in America having reorganised at Boston. The main armament of Santa Margarita consisted in 28 18-pounder long guns, while Amazone was a light frigate carrying only 26 12-pounder long guns.

== Action ==
Painting of Santa Margarita cutting Amazone adrift by Robert Dodd

Santa Margarita was initially chased by Amazone commanded by Lieutenant Montguyot, which he could not engage for fear of the French squadron coming up in her support. By 3pm however the larger ships were no longer in sight and, at the request of his crew, he tacked to fight the French frigate. At about 5pm both ships closed to within pistol shot and opened fire. At that range they fought for an hour and a quarter; the British having the heavier broadsides inflicted severe damage on Amazone. With several guns dismounted, 4 feet (1.2 m) of water in the hold, her masts and rigging badly damaged: the main and mizzen masts fell over board. With heavy casualties, her captain Montguyot dead and her first officer wounded, Amazone then struck her colours.

Santa Margarita took her prize in tow while Salter’s crew worked through the night to repair Amazone's damage sufficiently to sail her away. The French had lost heavily losing 70 killed with another 70 to 80 more wounded and the rest taken prisoner. By comparison the British had five dead, seventeen wounded and had sustained only minimal damage with her rigging taking the worst of it. Salter put a lieutenant and 68 men - a third of his company - aboard Amazone and took her in tow. A start was made on transferring her surviving crew to Santa Margarita as prisoners – a process hindered by the boats of both ships having been destroyed or damaged in the fighting. By dawn however de Vaudreuil's thirteen ships was back in sight and Salter saw no option but to retrieve his men and abandon Amazone.

Salter's preference would have been to burn her but large numbers of French prisoners, many of them wounded were still on Amazone. By now faced with an overwhelming force Santa Margarita once again made use of her speed and tried to escape. Salter and his crew were chased by the French fleet for 48 hours and finally eluded them by his pilot's skill in running the ship amid the shoals at the mouth of the Delaware River, where the French could not follow.

== Aftermath ==
Later in the year the young Horatio Nelson (then captain of HMS Albemarle) cited in a letter 'the dressing which Captain Salter gave the French frigate Amazone, for daring to leave the line-of-battle ships' in relation to the reluctance of another of de Vaudreuil's to follow that example and engage him off Boston. Salter in his official report gave high praise of the French crew and her captain, Lieutenant Montguyot, who was killed early in the action and his replacement and second in command the Chevalier de L'Épine.

Reporting on the action, Admiral Vaudreuil called the attention of Navy Minister Castrie upon the advantages of carronades and of friction primers over slow matches. The naval action was the inspiration for English artist Robert Dodd to do a pair of paintings (possibly commissioned by Salter himself) to commemorate the action. Both were exhibited at the Royal Academy in 1784, and are on display at the National Maritime Museum.

== Bibliography ==
- Fordham, Douglas; Barringer, T. J; Quilley, Geoff, eds. (2007). Art and the British Empire. Manchester University Press. ISBN 9780719073922.
- Lacour-Gayet, Georges (1910). La marine militaire de la France sous le règne de Louis XVI. Paris: Honoré Champion.
- Troude, Onésime-Joachim (1867). Batailles navales de la France (in French). Vol. 2. Challamel ainé.
- Anonymous (1789). Notices historiques et chéraldiques sur la famille Henin de Cuvillers et sur les différentes maisons qui y sont mentionnées (in French). Gillé.
- Winfield, Rif (2007). British Warships of the Age of Sail 1714–1792: Design, Construction, Careers and Fates. Seaforth. ISBN 9781783469260.

External sites

- "The capture of the 'Amazone' by HM ship 'Santa Margarita', 29 July 1782". Royal Museums Greenwich.
- "HMS Santa Margarita and L'Amazone 1782". Dawlish Chronicles. Archived from the original on 2017-11-15.
