= Alexander Graeme =

Royal Navy Admiral (1741–1818)

Admiral Alexander Graeme
- Born: 9 December 1741; Graemeshall, Orkney
- Died: 5 August 1818 (aged 76) Edinburgh
- Allegiance: United Kingdom
- Branch: Royal Navy
- Service years: c.1760–1818
- Rank: Admiral
- Commands: HMS Egmont; HMS Kingfisher; HMS Sphinx; HMS Diamond; HMS Pearl; HMS Tartar; HMS Preston; HMS Glory; Nore Command
- Conflicts: Seven Years' War; Invasion of Martinique; American Revolutionary War; Battle of Turtle Gut Inlet; Occupation of Rhode Island; Action of 11 November 1779; Battle of Dogger Bank (WIA); French Revolutionary Wars; Napoleonic Wars

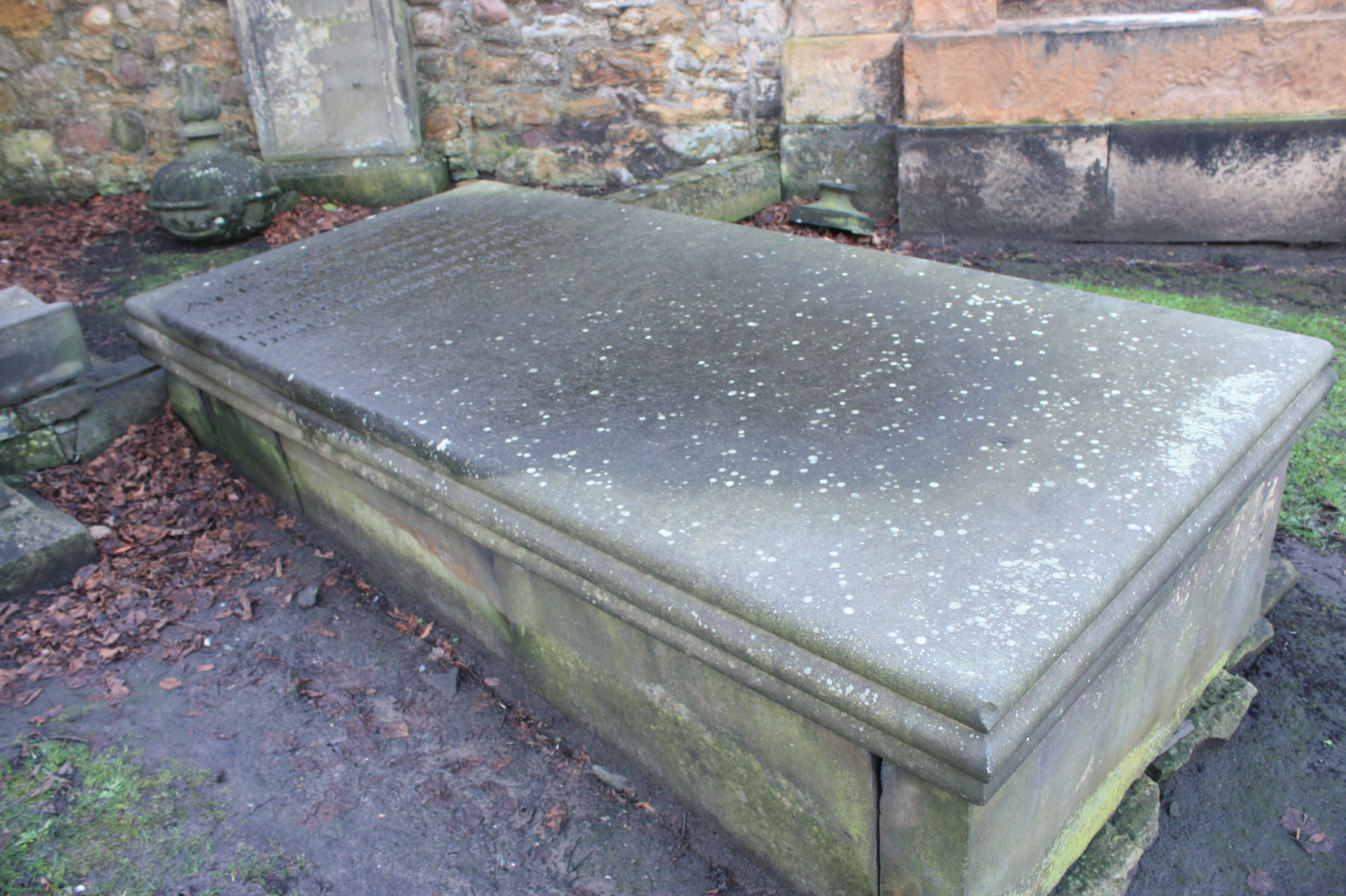
The grave of Admiral Alexander Graeme, Greyfriars Kirkyard

Admiral Alexander Graeme (9 December 1741 – 5 August 1818) was a Royal Navy officer who became Commander-in-Chief, The Nore.

== Naval career ==
Born at Graemeshall in Orkney, Graeme became commanding officer of the sloop HMS Kingfisher in February 1776 and saw action at the Battle of Turtle Gut Inlet in June 1776 during the American Revolutionary War. He went on to be commanding officer of the sixth-rate HMS Tartar in July 1779, in which he took part in the action of 11 November 1779, seizing the Spanish 38-gun frigate Santa Margarita off Cape Finisterre. After that he became commanding officer of the fourth-rate HMS Preston, in which he lost his arm during an action off Dogger Bank, in November 1781 and then became commanding officer of the second-rate HMS Glory in January 1795. He was appointed Commander-in-Chief, The Nore in June 1799 and retired as Admiral of the White.

Graeme lived his later life at 87 Princes Street in Edinburgh's New Town.

Graeme died in Edinburgh on 5 August 1818 aged 76 and was buried in Greyfriars Kirkyard in the centre of Edinburgh.

== Sources ==
- Allen, Joseph (1853). Battles of the British Navy. Vol. 1. H.G. Bohn.
- Williams, Thomas (2008). America's First Flag Officer - Father of the American Navy. Bloomington, Indiana: AuthorHouse. ISBN 978-1-4343-8653-3.

Military offices
Preceded by Sir Thomas Pasley	Commander-in-Chief, The Nore; 1799–1803	Succeeded by Lord Keith
