= Royal Captain (1772 ship) =

Coordinates: 9.0356°N 116.6362°E

History

Great Britain
- Name: Royal Captain
- Owner: Sir Richard Hotham
- Operator: East India Company
- Builder: Randall, Rotherhithe
- Launched: 28 September 1772
- Fate: Wrecked on 17 December 1773

General characteristics
- Class & type: East Indiaman
- Tons burthen: 499, (Note: The tonnage is somewhat suspect. Following Queen Anne's charter of 1702, between 1708 and 1747 almost every EIC vessel was registered as being of under 500 tons (bm). The reason was that the charter required every vessel of 500 tons or over to carry a chaplain.) or 863 or 864, (bm)
- Length: 143 ft (43.6 m)
- Beam: 36 ft (11.0 m)
- Sail plan: Full-rigged ship

Royal Captain was a British East Indiaman launched in 1772 and lost in 1773 in the South China Sea. In 1999, an expedition discovered the wreck and salvaged some of her cargo.

Randall built the three-decker, which her managing owner, Sir Richard Hotham, chartered to the East India Company. The ship measured 43.6 metres from bow to rudder and 11 metres across the beam.

== The voyage ==
The Royal Captain's first and only voyage took her to China via St Helena. Captain Edward Berrow (or Barrow) sailed from Portsmouth on 30 January 1773. (Note: Berrow had been captain of the previous Royal Captain.) Royal Captain reached St Helena on 11 April and arrived at Whampoa in the Pearl river region of China, on 23 August. She crossed the Second Bar on 28 November on her way home.

== Loss ==
On 17 December 1773, at 2:30 in the morning, Royal Captain struck an uncharted reef in the South China Sea. The place where she struck is now known as Royal Captain Shoal and is some 46 miles (76 kilometers) from Palawan in the South China Sea.

When she struck, in addition to her captain, Royal Captain was carrying six passengers and 99 crew members. Her cargo consisted of 100,000 pieces of Chinese porcelain, as well as tea, silk, glass beads, and gold.

Even though the crew managed to free the ship twice, a third collision with the reef sealed her fate and she sank with the bulk of her cargo. All but three crewmen survived the sinking; the three sailors who drowned were apparently drunk and refused to take to the lifeboats.

Lloyd's List reported that when the accident occurred Royal Captain was three days out of China and on her way to Balambangan Island on the northern tip of Sabah where, between 1761 and 1805, the East India Company maintained a free port. This report stated that the goods were saved, but it did note that three crew members drowned.

The British ship Union picked up the survivors and carried them to Balambangan. The crew returned home on Syren, a packet ship in the EIC's service.

== Discovery and salvage ==
In 1999, an expedition led by Franck Goddio located the wreck in a depth of about 350 meters and salvaged part of the remaining stage freight. Goddio utilised the Ocean Voyager as well as two high-tech 2-person submarines of the Deep Rover class, capable of diving 1000 metres.

== Documentary ==
A documentary about the ship, The Treasure of the Royal Captain, aired on the Discovery Channel in June 2000.
