= John Leveson-Gower (Royal Navy officer) =

Rear-Admiral The Honourable John Leveson-Gower
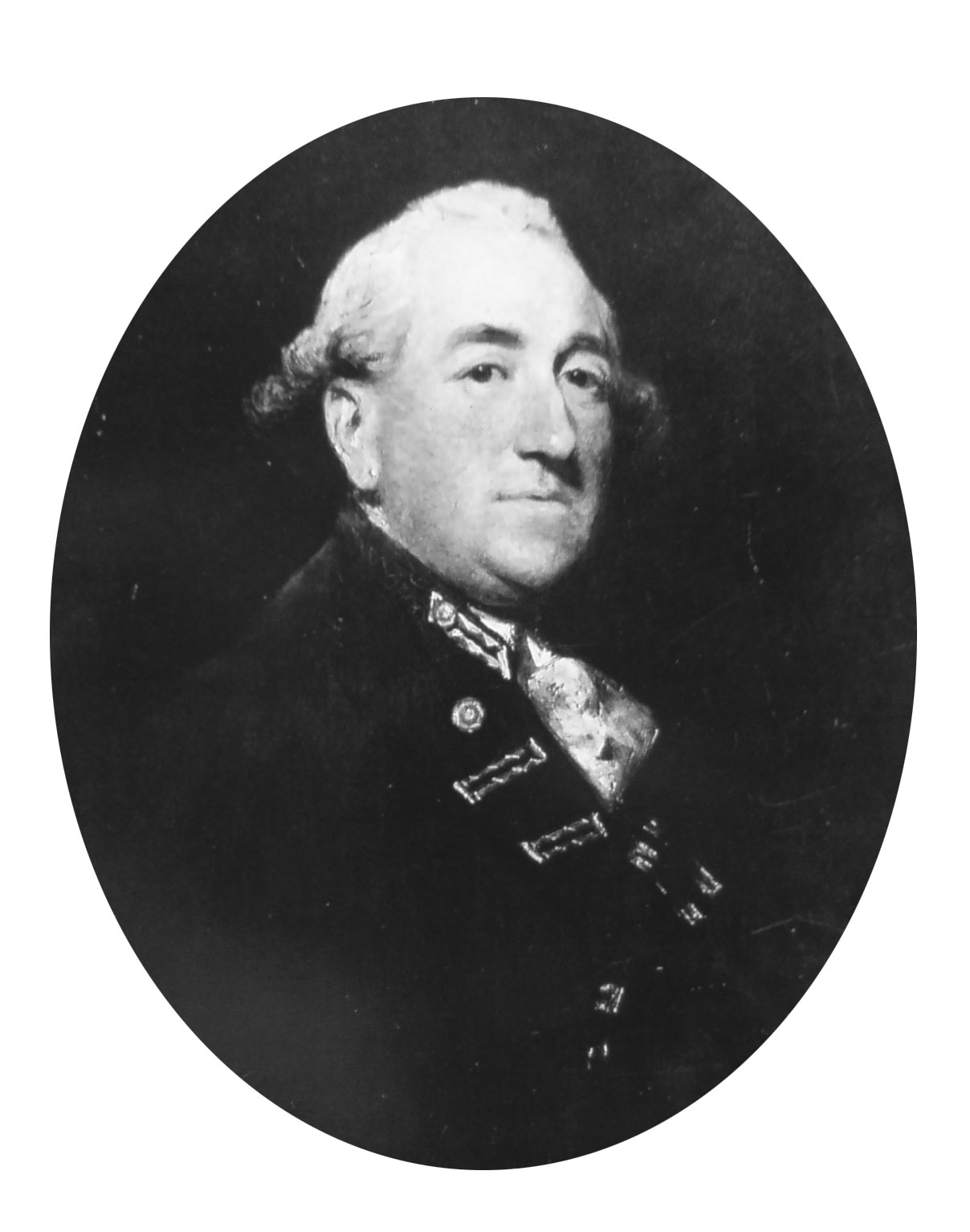
- Portrait of Leveson-Gower by Anthony Whitworth
- Born: 11 July 1740
- Died: 15 August 1792 (aged 52); Wokingham, Berkshire
- Burial place: Barkham, Berkshire
- Relatives: John Leveson-Gower, 1st Earl Gower (father); Granville Leveson-Gower, 1st Marquess of Stafford (half-brother)
- Military career
- Allegiance: Great Britain
- Branch: Royal Navy
- Service years: 1755–1792
- Rank: Rear admiral
- Commands: HMS Salamander; HMS Kingfisher; HMS Flamborough; HMS Quebec; HMS Africa; HMS Aeolus; HMS Pearl; HMS Albion; HMS Valiant; HMS Victory; Lord Commissioner of the Admiralty; HMS Hebe; Western Squadron
- Conflicts: Seven Years' War; Battle of Lagos; American War of Independence; Battle of Ushant (1778); Great Siege of Gibraltar; Battle of Cape Spartel

Rear-Admiral John Leveson-Gower (11 July 1740 – 15 August 1792) was a Royal Navy officer and politician from the Leveson-Gower family. As a junior officer he saw action at the Battle of Lagos in August 1759 during the Seven Years' War. As captain of HMS Valiant he was present at the Battle of Ushant on 17 July 1778 during the American War of Independence. He went on to be a junior Lord of the Admiralty and then First Naval Lord. He also sat as Member of Parliament for several constituencies.

== Family and early life ==
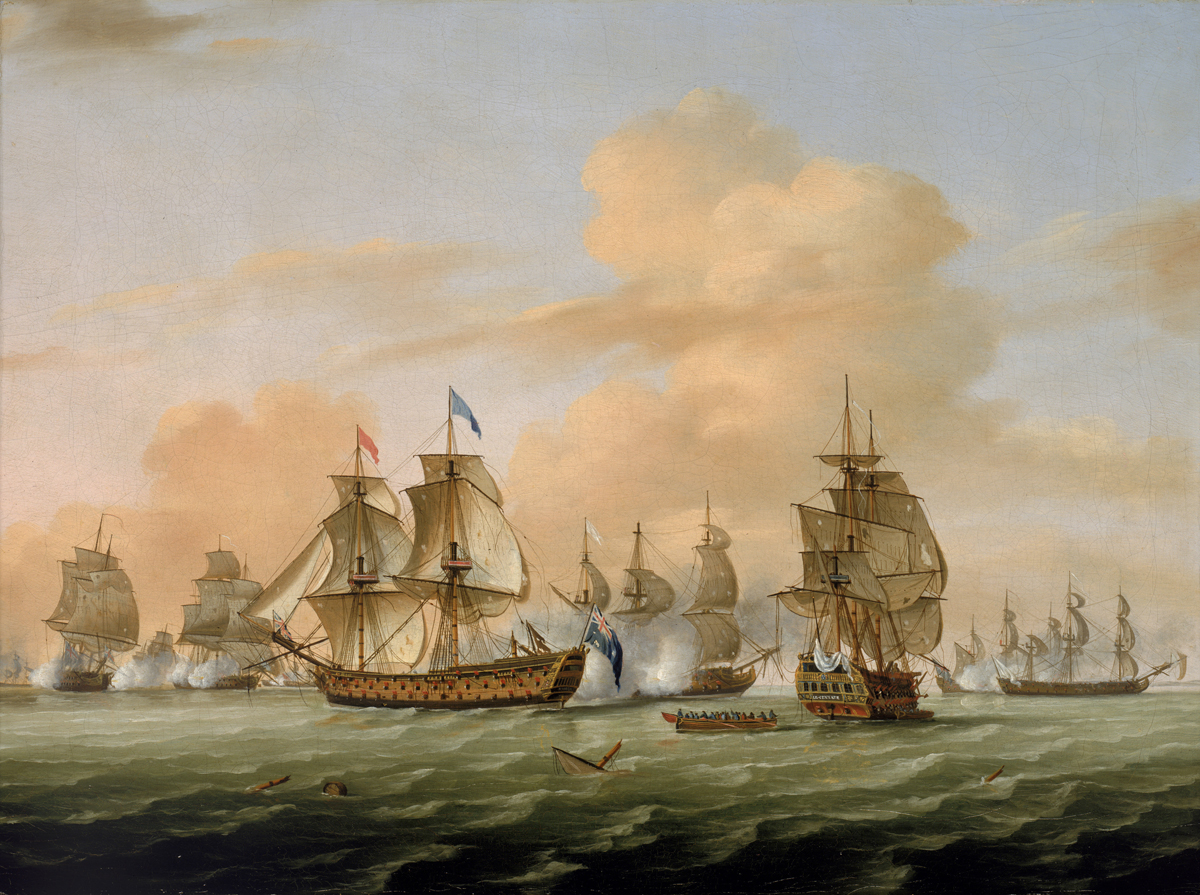
Painting of the Battle of Lagos by Thomas Luny

John was born on 11 July 1740, the second son of John, first earl Gower, by his third wife Lady Mary Tufton, daughter of Thomas Tufton, 6th Earl of Thanet and widow of Anthony Grey, earl Harold. His half-brother, Granville Leveson-Gower, inherited his father's earldom and would use his political influence to help John's career. John was privately educated and then entered the navy, receiving his lieutenant's commission in 1758. His first command was the fireship HMS Salamander, in which he saw action at the Battle of Lagos on 18 August 1759, serving under Admiral Edward Boscawen. Leveson-Gower was advanced to the rank of post captain on 30 June 1760 and took the 32-gun HMS Quebec to the Mediterranean to serve under Sir Charles Saunders. While commanding Quebec he captured the 18-gun French privateer Phoenix in December 1760 off Cape Palos.

Leveson-Gower then commanded the 64-gun HMS Africa, sailing her to Guinea and the West Indies in 1765. Later he commanded the frigates HMS Aeolus and HMS Pearl, and finally the guardship HMS Albion at Plymouth in 1774. He was appointed to command the 74-gun HMS Valiant in the English Channel in 1775, where he captured several American ships. He was present at the Battle of Ushant on 17 July 1778, where he strongly supported Admiral Augustus Keppel, Valiant sustaining casualties of six killed and twenty-six wounded. He gave evidence at Keppel's subsequent court-martial, defending his admiral's actions, and resigned his command afterwards.

== Further commands ==
Leveson-Gower returned to service after the fall of the North Ministry in March 1782 and was appointed first captain of HMS Victory under Lord Howe, and served in that capacity both in the Channel, and later on at the relief of Gibraltar and the skirmish off Cape Spartel. From January to April 1783 Gower was one of the junior lords of the admiralty on the Board of Admiralty with Lord Howe. He resigned after the formation of the Fox–North coalition in April, but rejoined when the Pitt Ministry was formed. From December 1783 to August 1789 he was First Naval Lord. He continued at the Admiralty with the Earl of Chatham until August 1789. During this time he hoisted a broad pennant in HMS Hebe in 1785, for a summer cruise around Great Britain with Prince William Henry; and was commodore in HMS Edgar in 1787, in command of the Channel Squadron. He was returned as the member for Appleby in 1784, sitting until 1790. He was elected to Newcastle-under-Lyme that year and spoke four times on Admiralty matters in Parliament.

On 24 September 1787 he was advanced to be rear-admiral, and in the following summer hoisted his flag again in Edgar in the Channel. In 1788 he took an enlarged squadron to the West Indies. During the Spanish armament in 1790 he was again first captain to Lord Howe, and in 1791 was selected as one of the rear-admirals to serve under Admiral Lord Hood in the fleet assembling to counter Russian aggression. The threat passed, however, and the fleet was disbanded.

== Death and issue ==
He died of a stroke while shaving on 15 August 1792 at his house at Bill Hill, Wokingham, and was buried on 23 August at Barkham parish church, Berkshire. He had married Frances Boscawen, eldest daughter of Admiral the Hon. Edward Boscawen and Frances Evelyn Glanville on 5 July 1773. They had several sons, including John, who became a general and MP, Edward, who became a rear-admiral, and Augustus, who was a captain and drowned aged 21. The small town of North Gower, in Ontario, Canada is named after him.

== Sources ==
- Rodger, N. A. M. (1979). The Admiralty. Offices of State. Lavenham: T. Dalton Ltd. ISBN 0900963948.

Military offices
Preceded by Hugh Pigot	First Naval Lord; 1783–1789	Succeeded by Lord Hood
Parliament of Great Britain
Preceded by Hon. William Pitt; Philip Honywood	Member of Parliament for Appleby; 1784–1790; With: Richard Penn	Succeeded by Hon. Robert Banks Jenkinson; Richard Ford
Preceded by Richard Vernon; Archibald Macdonald	Member of Parliament for Newcastle-under-Lyme; 1790–1792; With: Archibald Macdonald	Succeeded by William Egerton; Archibald Macdonald
