= Alexander Hood, 1st Viscount Bridport =

Royal Navy officer and politician (1726–1814)

Admiral The Right Honourable The Viscount Bridport KB
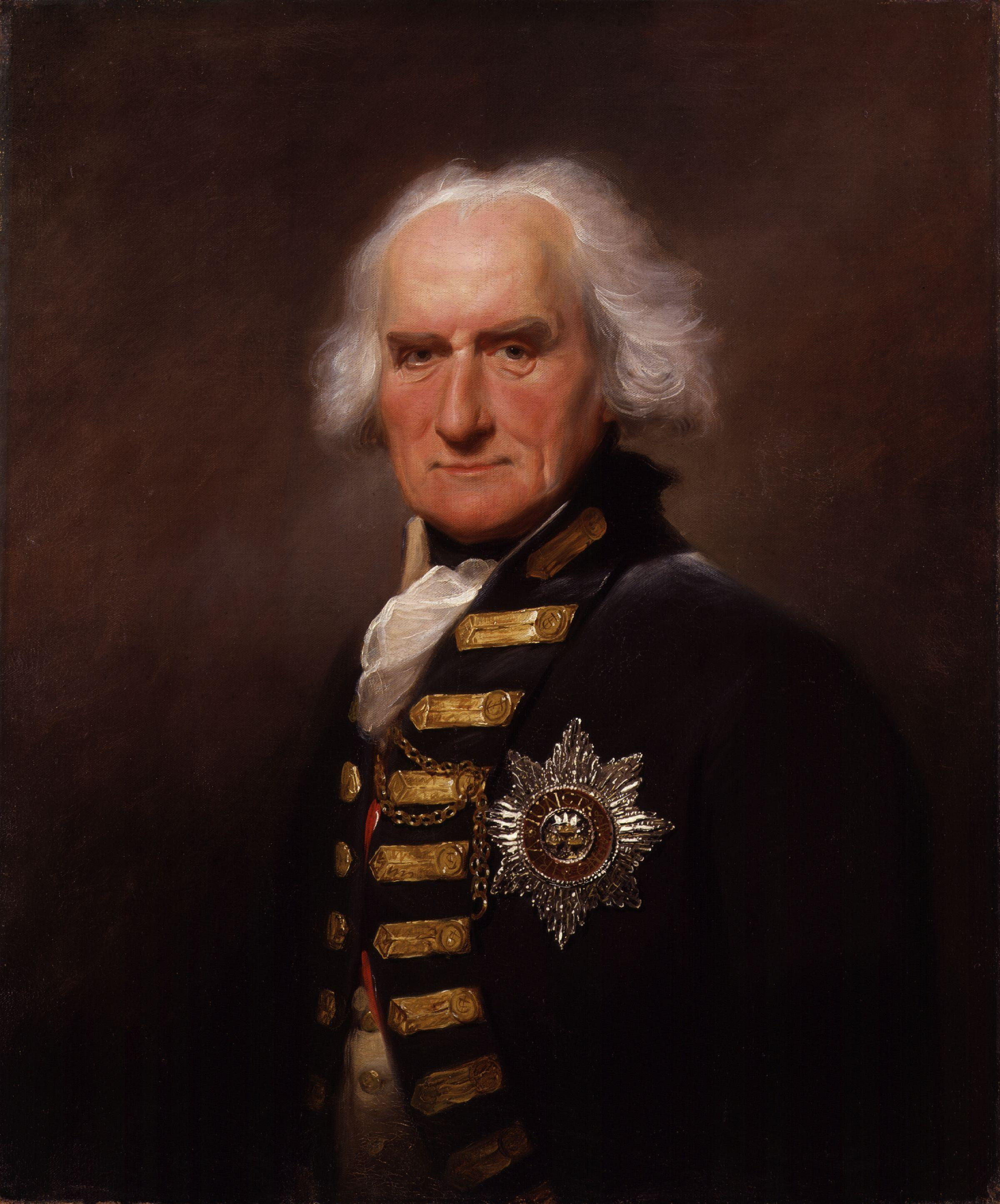
- Portrait by Lemuel Francis Abbott, 1795
- Born: 2 December 1726
- Died: 2 May 1814 (aged 87)
- Military career
- Allegiance: Great Britain; United Kingdom
- Branch: Royal Navy
- Service years: 1741–1814
- Rank: Admiral of the Red
- Commands: HMS Prince; HMS Minerva; HMS Africa; HMS Robust; Channel Fleet
- Conflicts: Seven Years' War; American Revolutionary War; French Revolutionary Wars
- Awards: Knight of the Order of the Bath; Large Naval Gold Medal

Admiral of the Red Alexander Hood, 1st Viscount Bridport, KB (2 December 1726 – 2 May 1814) was a Royal Navy officer and politician who served in the French Revolutionary and Napoleonic Wars.

== Origins ==
Arms of Hood: Azure, a fret argent on a chief or three crescents sable, as sculpted on his monument in Cricket St Thomas Church

He was a younger son of the Rev. Samuel Hood (1691/2 – 1777), Vicar of Butleigh and prebendary of Wells Cathedral (both in Somerset) and Vicar of Thorncombe in Devon (whose monument survives in St Leonard's Church, Butleigh), by his wife Mary Hoskins, a daughter of Richard Hoskins, Esquire, of Beaminster, Dorset.

His elder brother was Admiral Samuel Hood, 1st Viscount Hood (1724–1816). The sons of his first cousin Samuel Hood (1715–1805), a purser in the Royal Navy included Admiral Sir Samuel Hood, 1st Baronet (1762–1814), Captain Alexander Hood (1758–1798) and Captain Arthur Hood (1754–1776).

== Career ==
The story of his entry into the navy is recounted by Edmund Lodge (1756–1839) (a personal acquaintance of Lord Bridport) in his Portraits of Illustrious Personages of Great Britain:

To the breaking down of a carriage our naval history owes two of its most illustrious ornaments, and the offspring of a retired country clergyman two seats in the upper House of Parliament. The mischance occurred to Thomas Smith, afterwards a Vice-Admiral, a commander whose memory is still highly celebrated and cherished by the profession, in travelling through Mr. Hood's village of Butleigh, which afforded neither the means of repairing the damage, so as to enable the stranger for many hours to pursue his journey, nor any public place of accommodation in which he might pass the night. The vicar, however, presently appeared, with a hearty invitation to the parsonage, which was gladly accepted, and there entertained his unexpected guest with his best hospitalities. In the morning, when Mr. Smith was about to take his leave, he said, "Mr. Hood, you have two sons; would either of them like to go with me to sea?" It was first proposed to Samuel, the elder, who declined; but Alexander with cheerful eagerness accepted it, and, shortly after, joined his new patron. Returning for a time, about twelve months after, his brother Samuel was so well pleased with his report, that he also became desirous of entering the service, as he presently did, under the same favourable auspices; and it thus happened that, though the elder brother, he became, in after life, the younger Admiral.

Alexander entered the navy in January 1741 and was appointed lieutenant in HMS Bridgewater in 1746. He was promoted to commander in 1756 and served as flag captain for Rear Admiral Sir Charles Saunders, first in HMS Prince in the Mediterranean Sea (the flagship of Rear-Admiral Saunders, under whom Hood had served as a lieutenant), then in the frigate HMS Minerva.

=== Seven Years' War ===
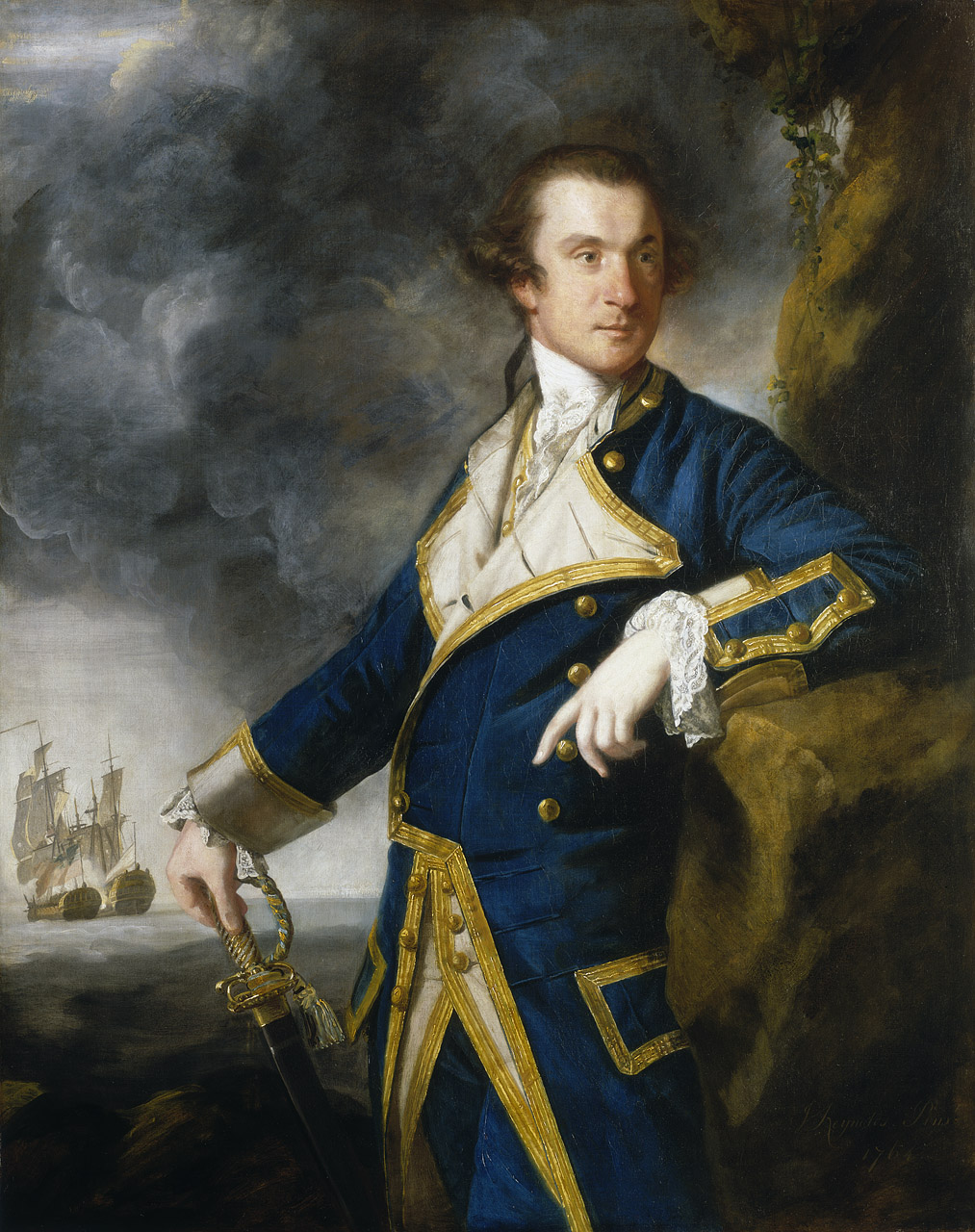
Portrait of Alexander Hood by Joshua Reynolds, 1763. Minerva is shown in the background recapturing Warwick.

In the Seven Years' War Hood fought at the Battle of Quiberon Bay on 20 November 1759, and in 1761 Minerva recaptured after a long struggle, the 60-gun Warwick of equal force, which had been captured by the French in 1756. For the remainder of the war, from 1761 to 1763, he was captain of HMS Africa in the Mediterranean.

=== American War of Independence ===
From this time forward Hood was in continuous employment afloat and ashore. In 1778 he was appointed to HMS Robust and fought at the First Battle of Ushant on 22 July. In the court-martial of Admiral Augustus Keppel that followed the battle, although adverse popular feeling was aroused by the course which Hood took in Keppel's defence, his conduct does not seem to have injured his professional career.

In 1780 Hood was promoted to Rear Admiral of the White, and succeeded Kempenfeldt as one of Howe's flag officers. In the American Revolutionary War, in HMS Queen, he took part in Howe's relief of Gibraltar in 1782.

=== French Revolutionary Wars ===
Hood served in the House of Commons of Great Britain for a time. Promoted vice-admiral in 1787, he was appointed a Knight of the Bath in the following year, and on the occasion of the Spanish Armament in 1790 flew his flag again for a short time. On 22 October 1790 he was a member of the court that acquitted William Bligh of losing his ship HMS Bounty. On the outbreak of war with France in 1793 he went to sea again. In the War of the First Coalition, on 1 June 1794, in HMS Royal George (100), he was third in command to Admiral Richard Howe, Earl Howe at the Glorious First of June. For his exploits in this battle he was elevated to the Irish peerage as Baron Bridport and received the large Naval Gold Medal and chain.

Henceforth Hood was practically in independent command. On 23 June 1795, with his flag in Royal George, he fought the Battle of Groix against a French fleet under Louis Thomas Villaret de Joyeuse off the Île de Groix and captured three ships. He was much criticized in the navy for his failure to win a more decisive victory. However the British public considered the battle a great victory and his peerage was made English and he was promoted to Vice-Admiral of Great Britain.

From 1795 until Hood's retirement in 1800, he was commander of the Channel Fleet. In 1796 and 1797 he directed the war from HMS London, rarely hoisting his flag afloat save at such critical times as that of the Irish expedition in 1797. He was about to put to sea when the Spithead fleet mutinied. He succeeded at first in pacifying the crew of his flagship, who had no personal grudge against their admiral, but a few days later the mutiny broke out afresh, and this time was uncontrollable. For a whole week the mutineers were supreme, and it was only by the greatest exertions of the old Lord Howe that order was then restored and the men returned to duty. After the mutiny had been suppressed, Hood took the fleet to sea as commander-in-chief in name as well as in fact, and from 1798 he personally directed the blockade of Brest, which grew stricter and stricter as time went on. In 1800 he was relieved by John Jervis, 1st Earl of St Vincent. In reward for Hood's fine record his peerage was made a viscounty. He spent the remaining years of his life in retirement and died on 2 May 1814.

== Cricket House ==
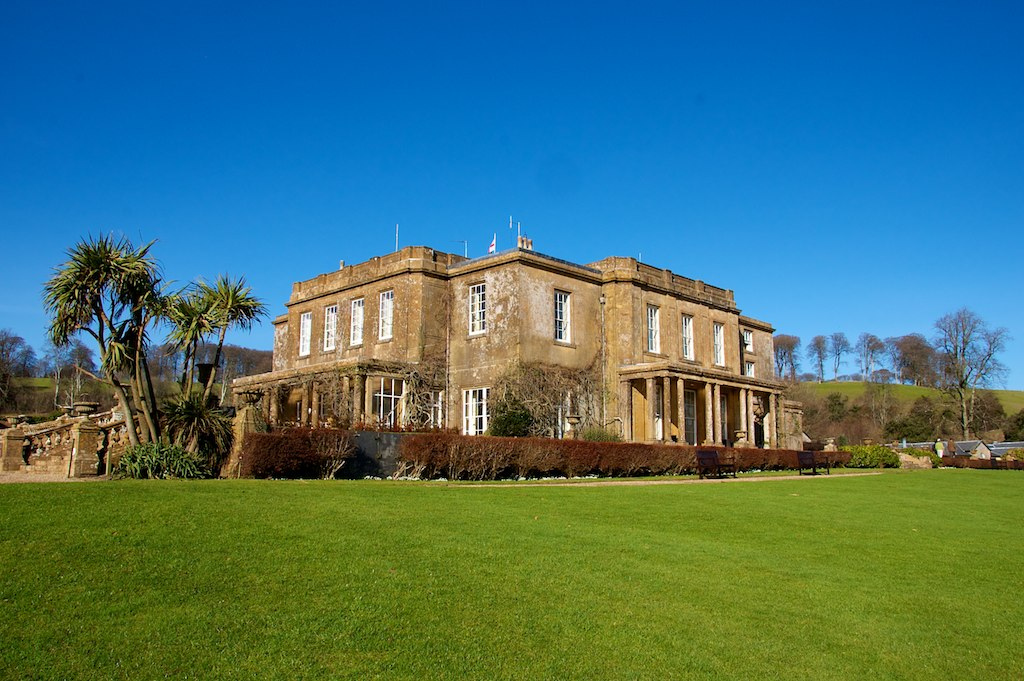
Cricket House, built in 1786 by Admiral Hood to the design of Sir John Soane

In 1786 he built the surviving grade II listed Georgian manor house, known as "Cricket House", to the designs of his friend the architect Sir John Soane (1753–1837). The Admiral had purchased the estate in 1775 from Richard Hippisley Coxe. It is unknown whether the new house incorporated elements of the earlier 14th century house or whether it was completely new. Soane completed further alterations in 1801–1807. The Georgian orangery attached to the house was later turned into a parrot house.

== Marriages ==
He married twice, but failed to produce any issue:

- Firstly in 1758 to Maria West (c.1726-1786), known as "Molly", a daughter of the Reverend Richard West, Prebendary of Winchester, by his wife Mary Temple, a daughter of Sir Richard Temple, 3rd Baronet, of Stowe, Buckinghamshire, and sister of Richard Temple, 1st Viscount Cobham. Her modest mural monument designed by Sir John Soane (1753–1837) (who in 1786 rebuilt Cricket House for her husband) survives in Cricket St Thomas Church, comprising an urn capped by a segmental pediment surmounting a tablet inscribed as follows:

Sacred to the Memory of Mary Wife of Rear Admiral Alexander Hood, who died 12 September 1786, After a short illness. She was Daughter of the Reverend Doctor West And Niece to Lord Viscount Cobham of Stow in Buckinghamshire Whose Eldest Sister her Father Married. From the purest sentiments of esteem And in just testimony of her pious benevolence And most amiable disposition, Her affectionate Husband, has caused this humble Monument to be Erected. 1787.

- Secondly in 1788 to Mary Sophia Bray (d. 1831), only daughter and heiress of Thomas Bray of Edmonton, Middlesex.

== Death and succession ==
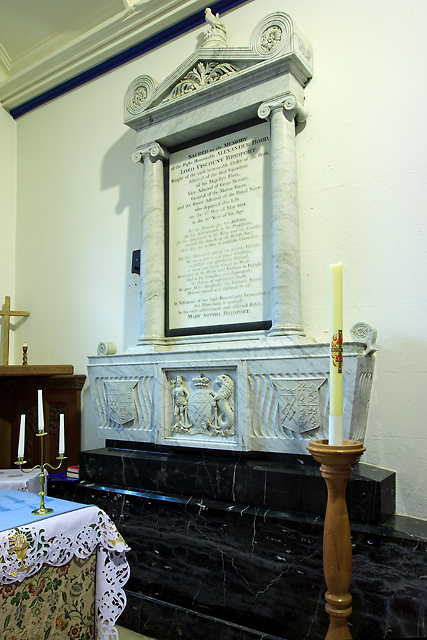
Monument to Alexander Hood, 1st Viscount Bridport, Cricket St Thomas Church, Somerset, designed by Sir John Soane (1753–1837). Displaying the arms of Hood, West and Bray, with quarterings, topped by the Hood crest of A Cornish Chough resting on an anchor

He died without issue on 2 May 1814 when the Viscountcy in the Peerage of the United Kingdom became extinct. His Irish barony passed by special remainder to his younger great-nephew Samuel Hood, 2nd Baron Bridport (1788–1868), the husband of Charlotte Mary Nelson, 3rd Duchess of Bronte (1787–1873), daughter and heiress of William Nelson, 1st Earl Nelson, 2nd Duke of Bronte (1757–1835), elder brother and heir of the great Admiral Horatio Nelson, 1st Viscount Nelson, 1st Duke of Bronte (1758–1805). Samuel and Charlotte's son Alexander Hood, 1st Viscount Bridport, 3rd Baron Bridport (1814–1904) (Viscountcy created 1868), 4th Duke of Bronte in Sicily, sold Cricket House and its estate in 1898 to the chocolate manufacturer Francis Fry (d.1918), the estate having become heavily mortgaged.

=== Burial and monument ===
He was buried in Cricket St Thomas Church, where survives his monument designed by his friend Sir John Soane (1753–1837), who in 1786 rebuilt Cricket House for him. It is inscribed as follows:

For His Bravery, for his Abilities For his Achievements in his Profession For his Attachment to his King, and his Country, Consult the annals of the British Navy, Where they are written in Indelible Characters. Let this Monument record his private virtues. He was a sincere and pious Christian, A faithful and Affectionate Husband, A Warm and Steady Friend to Merit Benevolent to the Brave and Virtuous in Distress: Kind to his Domestics and Dependents, The Patron of unprotected Youth, The Poor Man's Benefactor, the Seamen's Friend, Beloved, Revered, and Deplored by All

== See also ==
- Hood's cousin once removed, also named Alexander Hood (1758–1798), was a captain in the Royal Navy, famous for a duel between his ship Mars and the French Hercule.

Parliament of Great Britain
Preceded by Hon. Anne Poulett; John Acland	Member of Parliament for Bridgwater; 1784–1790; With: Hon. Anne Poulett 1784–1785; Robert Thornton 1785–1790	Succeeded by Hon. Vere Poulett; John Langston
Preceded by James Grenville; George Nugent	Member of Parliament for Buckingham; 1790–1796; With: George Nugent	Succeeded by George Nugent; Thomas Grenville
Honorary titles
Preceded by George Darby	Rear-Admiral of Great Britain; 1790–1796	Succeeded by Sir William Cornwallis
Preceded by The Earl Howe	Vice-Admiral of Great Britain/the United Kingdom; 1796–1814	Succeeded by Sir William Cornwallis
Peerage of Great Britain
New title	Viscount Bridport; 1800–1814	Extinct
New title	Baron Bridport; 1796–1814	Extinct
Peerage of Ireland
New title	Baron Bridport; 1794–1814	Succeeded by Samuel Hood
