= HMS Essex (1760) =

Ship of the line of the Royal Navy

- Ship plan of Essex

History

Great Britain
- Name: HMS Essex
- Ordered: 31 January 1759
- Builder: Wells and Stanton, Rotherhithe
- Launched: 28 August 1760
- Fate: Sold out of the service, 1799
- Notes: Harbour service from 1777

General characteristics
- Class & type: Essex-class ship of the line
- Tons burthen: 137865/94 (bm)
- Length: 158 ft (48 m) (gundeck)
- Beam: 44 ft 2 in (13.46 m)
- Depth of hold: 18 ft 10 in (5.74 m)
- Propulsion: Sails
- Sail plan: Full-rigged ship
- Armament: Gundeck: 26 × 24-pounder guns; Upper gundeck: 26 × 18-pounder guns; QD: 10 × 4-pounder guns; Fc: 2 × 9-pounder guns

HMS Essex was a 64-gun third rate ship of the line of the Royal Navy, launched on 28 August 1760 at Rotherhithe.

In March 1762 Essex captured three small vessels:

- Amis, a brig (1 March)
- Esperance, a privateer of four guns, six swivel guns, and 45 men (6 March)
- Bien Aimé, a privateer of four guns and 52 men (7 March)

== Fate ==
Essex was on harbour service from 1777, and was sold out of the service in 1799.
