= French frigate Amazone (1778) =

Iphigénie-class frigate of the French Navy

- Amazone (right) at the action of 29 July 1782

History

France
- Name: Amazone
- Namesake: Amazons
- Builder: Saint Malo, Guillemant Dépêches and Fromy Dupuy upon plans by Léon-Michel Guignace
- Laid down: August 1777
- Launched: 11 May 1778
- Completed: July 1778
- Fate: Wrecked 1797

General characteristics
- Class & type: Iphigénie-class frigate
- Displacement: 1,150 tonneaux
- Tons burthen: 620 port tonneaux
- Length: 44.2 metres
- Beam: 11.2 metres
- Draught: 4.9 metres
- Sail plan: Full-rigged ship
- Complement: 9 to 10 officers; 261 to 278 men
- Armament: 26 × 12-pounder long guns; 6 × 6-pounder long guns; 4 × 36-pounder obusiers de vaisseau added in 1794.

Amazone was a 32-gun Iphigénie-class frigate of the French Navy. She was the second ship of the French Navy to receive copper sheathing in 1778. Amazone served in the American Revolutionary War under Jean-François de Galaup, comte de Lapérouse and served later in the French Revolutionary Wars.

== Career ==
Amazone (centre-left) being cut adrift by HMS Santa Margarita on 30 July 1782

Amazone was commissioned in July 1778, in time for the Anglo-French War that had broken out in June. She took part in the War of American Independence under Captain Lapérouse, and constituted the vanguard of the French squadron that came to support the Continental Army, arriving at Boston on 11 June 1780. On 7 October 1779, Amazone captured the 20-gun HMS Ariel.

On 2 May 1780, she departed Brest with the 7-ship and 3-frigate Expédition Particulière under Admiral Ternay, escorting 36 transports carrying troops to support the Continental Army in the War of American Independence. The squadron comprised the 80-gun Duc de Bourgogne, under Ternay d'Arsac (admiral) and Médine (flag captain); the 74-gun Neptune, under Sochet Des Touches, and Conquérant, under La Grandière; and the 64-gun Provence under Lombard, Ardent under Bernard de Marigny, Jason under La Clocheterie and Éveillé under Le Gardeur de Tilly, and the frigates Surveillante under Villeneuve Cillart, Amazone under La Pérouse, and Bellone. Amazone, which constituted the vanguard of the fleet, arrived at Boston on 11 June 1780.

From October to November 1780, she sailed from Rhode Island to Lorient, and from there to the Caribbean. In the action of 29 July 1782, HMS Santa Margarita briefly captured Amazone, off Cape Henry, but the next day a French squadron under Louis-Philippe de Vaudreuil intervened and recaptured the frigate.

== Fate ==
Amazone was wrecked off Penmarch in January 1797. Six of her crew died in the accident.
