= Augustus Leveson-Gower =

British Naval officer drowned in Jamaica (1781–1802)

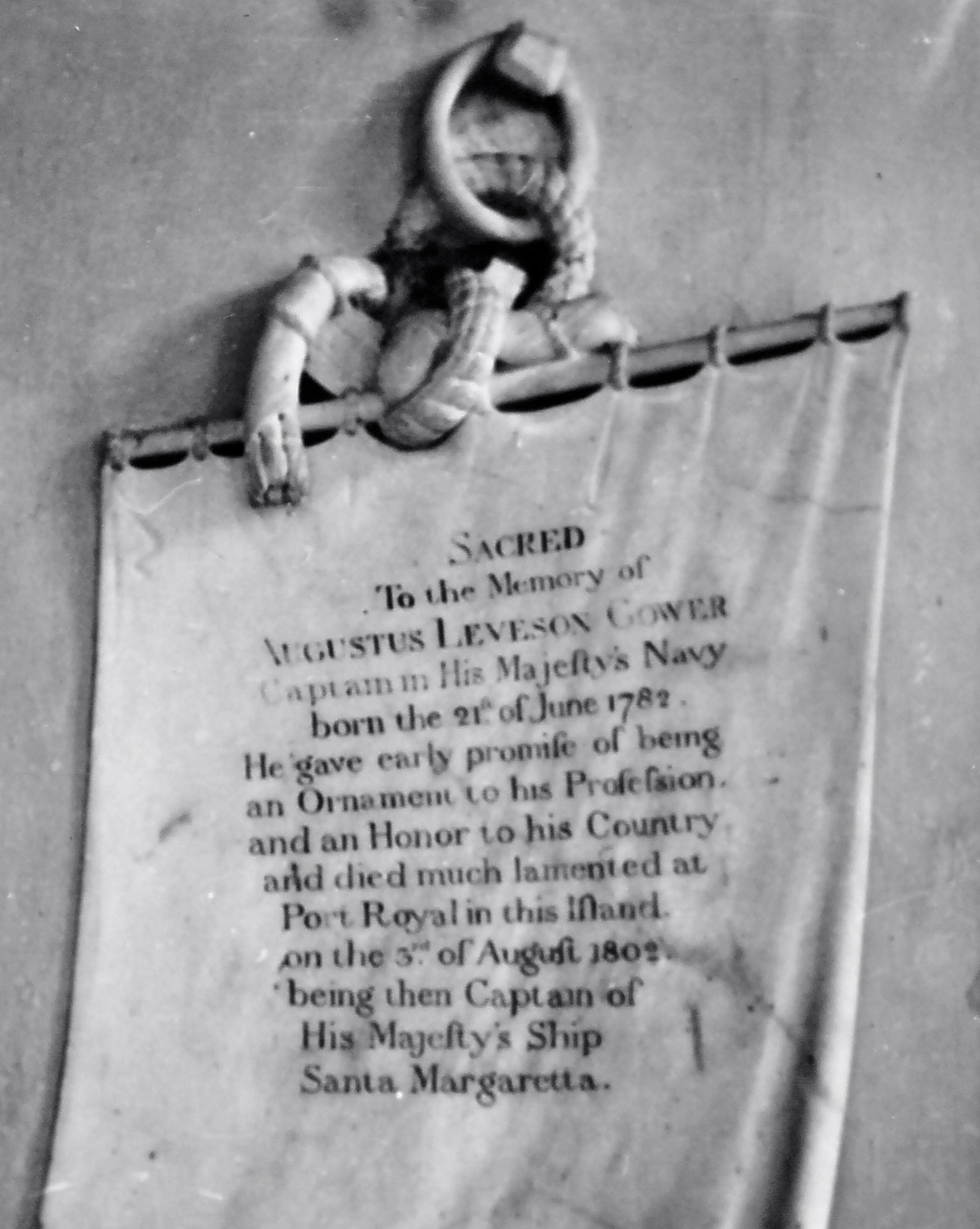
Memorial at Kingston Cathedral, Kingston, Jamaica

Captain Augustus Leveson-Gower (21 June 1782 – 3 August 1802) served in the Royal Navy during the French Revolutionary war.

== Career ==
He was commissioned as a Lieutenant on 11 January 1800. He was commissioned as a Commander on 20 October 1801. In April 1802 he was commissioned Captain of HMS Santa Margarita, a 36-gun fifth-rate frigate. He died aged 20 at Port Royal, Jamaica.

"Sacred to the Memory of Augustus Leveson Gower, Captain in His Majesty's Navy, born the 21st of June 1782. He gave early promise of being an ornament to his profession, and an honor to his country, and died much lamented, at Port Royal in this Island, on the 3rd August 1802, being then Captain of His Majesty's Ship Santa Margaretta."
Kingston Cathedral Church - Mural, gray-white and reddish-brown marble and stone, a naval trophy, inscription on a boat's square sail of white marble.

== Family ==
Augustus Leveson-Gower was the son of Admiral the Hon. John Leveson-Gower (1740–1792) by his wife Frances Boscawen. Admiral John was the son of John Leveson-Gower, 1st Earl Gower and Mary Tufton. Frances Boscawen was the eldest daughter of Admiral the Hon. Edward Boscawen and Frances Glanville. Augustus Leveson-Gower died unmarried, without issue and was survived by his mother and all brothers and sisters.

"Account of estate of the late Captain A. Leveson Gower in account with B. General Leveson Gower as administrator sent to J. T. Coryton of Crocadon. Postmarked Ipswich n.d. (watermark 1803), with covering letter from J. Leveson Gower (dated Ipswich 5 May 1805) who was administrator of bro. Augustus and sister Mary."
