= Juno (1793 ship) =

History

Great Britain
- Name: Juno
- Namesake: Juno (mythology)
- Builder: Hull
- Launched: 1793
- Fate: Possibly captured or condemned 1809; last listed 1809

General characteristics
- Tons burthen: 239 (bm)

Juno was launched at Hull in 1793 as a West Indiaman. French privateers once detained her and once captured her, but the Royal Navy recaptured her. She made one voyage as a whaler in the Southern Whale Fishery, and then participated as a transport in a naval expedition. She then disappears from readily accessible records. In 1809 she may have been captured off Africa, or condemned at the Cape of Good Hope and broken up.

== Career ==
Although Juno was launched in 1793, she did not appear in Lloyd's Register until 1796.

On 17 August 1995 three French privateers of 18, 16, and 14 guns, stopped Juno, Baxter, master, 25 leagues west of the Naze of Norway. She had been sailing from Petersburg to Bristol and after they released her she arrived at Peterhead with some delay.

Year	Master	Owner	Trade	Source & notes
1796	R. Baxter	Daniel & Co.	Bristol–Saint Petersburg	Lloyd's Register
1800	Watkins; Blackburn	Daniel & Co. Blackburn	Cork–Jamaica; London–Grenada	Lloyd's Register

Lloyd's List reported on 28 May 1799 that Juno, Watkins, master, had been captured. However, the frigate HMS Santa Margarita had recaptured her and sent her into Martinico.

Lloyd's Register for 1802 showed Juno with Blackburn as master and owner, and trade London–Grenada. It also showed her master as changing to Richardson and her trade to London-Southern Fishery. At the time, Juno was valued at £2,000.

Captain Richardson sailed from London on 13 July 1802, bound for the Pacific. Juno was reported to have been in the Pacific in November 1803, at the Galapagos Islands in January 1804, and off the coast of Peru in April. She returned to London on 21 March 1805.

Juno next participated as a victualer in the British invasion of the Dutch Cape Colony (1805-1806). After the invasion, the victualer Juno, of 239 tons (bm), sailed on 11 March 1806 to Plettenberg Bay to load with timber.

== Fate ==
Lloyd's Register and the Register of Shipping continued to carry Juno with Richardson, master, Blackburn, owner, and trade London–Southern Fishery, until 1809. Other records show her returning to whaling.

However, she may have been the brig Juno that the French privateer Hirondelle captured as Juno was coming from Prince's Island in 1809, and took into Cherbourg. Lloyd's List reported the capture in May 1809.

Alternatively, she may have been the whaler Juno, Goodspeed, master, that Lloyd's List reported in August 1809 had been condemned at the Cape of Good Hope and broken up.
