= St Albans-class ship of the line =

Class overview
- Name: St Albans
- Operators: Royal Navy
- Preceded by: Essex class
- Succeeded by: Exeter class
- In service: 12 September 1764 – 1814
- Completed: 3
- Lost: 1

General characteristics
- Type: Ship of the line
- Length: 159 ft (48 m) (gundeck); 131 ft 7 3/4 in (40.126 m) (keel)
- Beam: 44 ft 4 in (13.51 m)
- Propulsion: Sails
- Armament: 64 guns: Gundeck: 26 × 24 pdrs; Upper gundeck: 26 × 18 pdrs; Quarterdeck: 10 × 4 pdrs; Forecastle: 2 × 9 pdrs

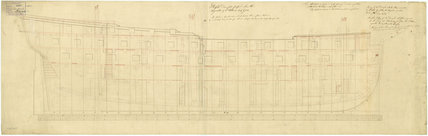

The St Albans-class ships of the line were a class of three 64-gun third rates, designed for the Royal Navy by Sir Thomas Slade.

== Design ==
Slade based the St Albans draught on that of his earlier 74-gun Bellona class.

== Ships ==
- HMS St Albans

Builder: Perry, Blackwall Yard, London
Ordered: 13 January 1761
Launched: 12 September 1764
Fate: Broken up, 1814

- HMS Augusta

Builder: Wells and Stanton, Rotherhithe
Ordered: 13 January 1761
Launched: 24 October 1763
Fate: Burned, 1777

- HMS Director

Builder: Clevely, Gravesend
Ordered: 2 August 1780
Launched: 9 March 1784
Fate: Broken up, 1801
