= HMS Santa Margarita =

Frigate of the Royal Navy

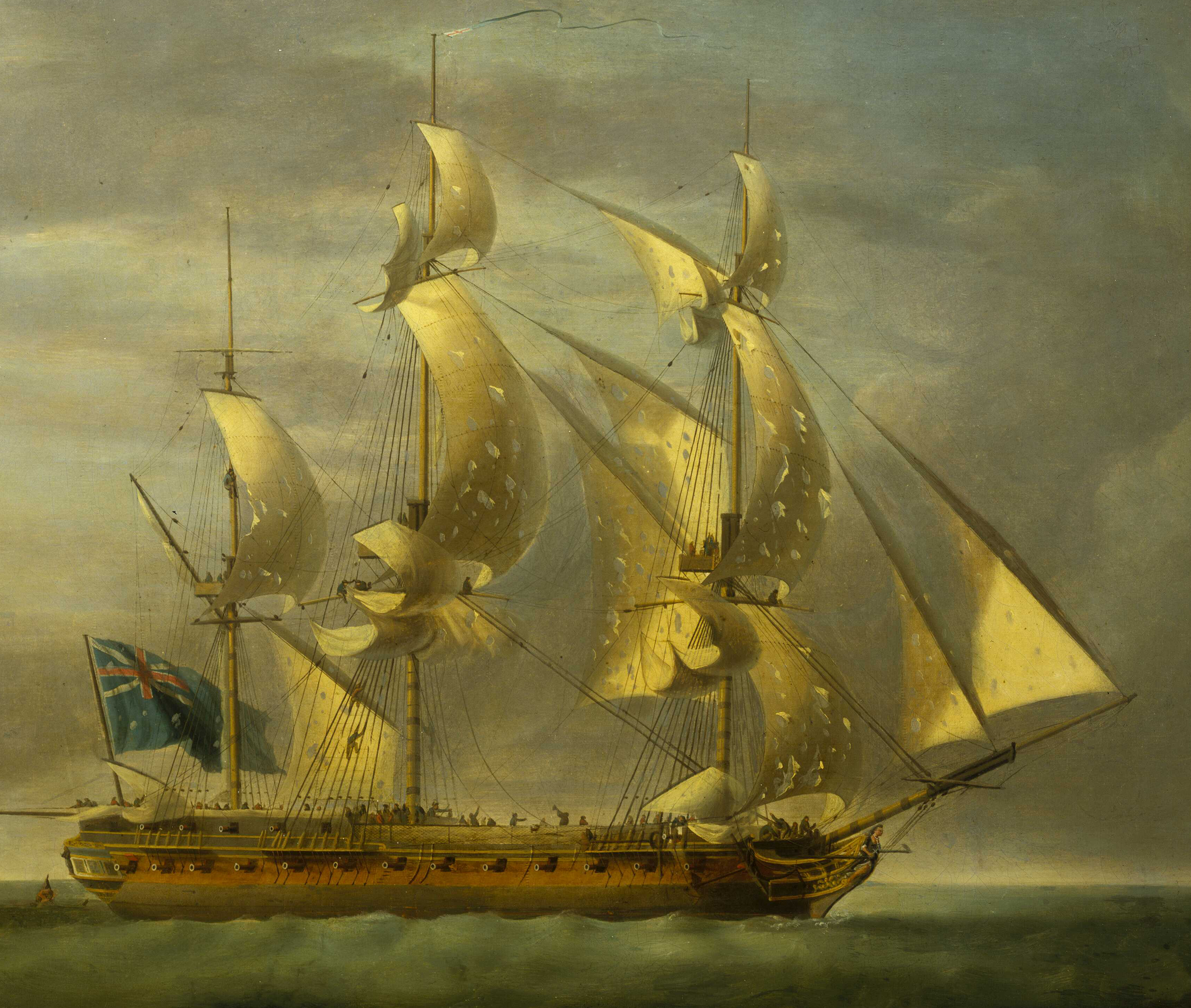
- Painting of Santa Margarita by Robert Dodd

History

Spain
- Name: Santa Margarita
- Launched: 1774
- Captured: 11 November 1779, by the Royal Navy

Great Britain
- Name: HMS Santa Margarita
- Acquired: 11 November 1779
- Fate: Sold on 8 September 1836

General characteristics
- Class & type: 36-gun fifth-rate frigate
- Tons burthen: 992 bm
- Length: 145 ft 6 in (44.3 m)
- Beam: 38 ft 11 in (11.9 m)
- Depth of hold: 11 ft 9 in (3.6 m)
- Sail plan: Full-rigged ship
- Complement: 240 (255 from 21 December 1780)
- Armament: Gun deck: 26 × 12-pounder guns; QD: 8 × 6-pounder guns + 8 × 18-pounder carronades; Fc: 2 × 6-pounder guns

HMS Santa Margarita was a 36-gun fifth-rate frigate of the Royal Navy. She had been built for service with the Spanish Navy, but was captured after five years in service, eventually spending nearly 60 years with the British.

== Spanish career ==
Santa Margarita was built at Ferrol, Spain and launched in 1774. In the action of 11 November 1779 Captain Alex Graeme of HMS Tartar brought her to battle off Lisbon and captured her. She was taken into Royal Navy service by an Admiralty order of 16 March 1780; Santa Margarita was then repaired and refitted at Sheerness between February 1780 and June 1781.

== British career ==
=== American War of Independence ===
Painting of the action of 29 July 1782 by Robert Dodd

Painting of Santa Margarita cutting Amazone adrift by Dodd

Santa Margarita was commissioned in March 1781 under Captain Elliot Salter, who sailed her to North America where she formed part of George Johnstone's squadron in June 1781. In the action of 29 July 1782 she captured the 36-gun Amazone off Cape Henry, but on the next day a French squadron under Louis-Philippe de Vaudreuil intervened, recapturing Amazone. Two months later, on 30 September, Santa Margarita captured the American privateer Hendrick. Santa Margarita was repaired at Bucklers Hard between 1790 and 1793, followed by a period fitting out at Portsmouth.

Bounty for Taking L'Amazone Act 1784
- Act of Parliament
- Parliament of Great Britain
- Long title: An Act for authorizing the Treasurer of the Navy to pay to the Officers and Men belonging to His Majesty's Ship Santa Margaretta, the like Bounty for taking the French Frigate called L'Amazone, as is allowed to the Officers and Men on board any of His Majesty's Ships of War, taking or destroying Ships of War belonging to the Enemy.
- Citation: 24 Geo. 3. Sess. 2. c. 28
- Territorial extent: Great Britain

Dates
- Royal assent: 13 August 1784
- Commencement: 18 May 1784 (Note: Start of session.)
- Repealed: 21 August 1871

Other legislation
- Repealed by: Statute Law Revision Act 1871

Status: Repealed

Text of statute as originally enacted

=== French Revolutionary Wars ===
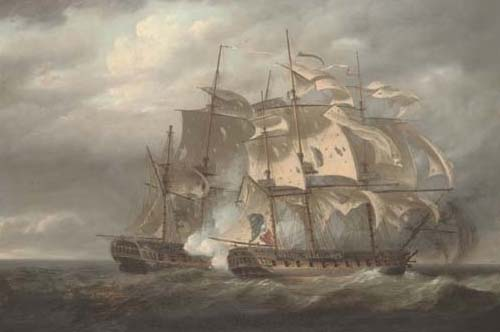
The capture of the French Frigate Tamise (formerly HMS Thames) by Santa Margarita, under the command of Captain T. Byam Martin, off the Scilly Isles, 8 June 1796. Nicholas Pocock

Santa Margarita was recommissioned under Captain Eliab Harvey in 1793, and sailed to the Leeward Islands in December that year. She then formed part of the fleet in the West Indies under John Jervis, and was present at the capture of Martinique in February 1794. By August 1794 she was in Sir John Borlase Warren's squadron, and was present at the destruction of Volontaire on the Penmarks on 23 August 1794, and the capture of Espion and the destruction of Alerte in Audierne Bay on that day.

On 29 March 1795 she was sailing with HMS Cerberus when the two engaged and captured the 18-gun Jean Bart in the English Channel. Jean Bart was subsequently taken into service as HMS Arab. A few days earlier the squadron to which Cerberus and Santa Margarita belonged shared in the capture of Jean Bart and the recapture of Caldicot Castle. In April 1795 Santa Margarita came under the command of Captain Thomas Byam Martin. In September 1795 a French squadron captured Hibberts, Chisolm, master, as she was sailing from Jamaica to London, but Santa Margarita recaptured her.

At the action of 8 June 1796 she captured the French Tamise, which had previously been HMS Thames. Santa Margarita had two killed and three wounded in the action. She went on to capture two French privateers, the 16-gun Buonoparte on 24 October 1796, and the 18-gun Vengeur the following day. Buonoparte was the former British packet ship King George, and Santa Margarita sent both into Cork. Vengeur was armed with 18 guns and had a crew of 110 men. She was nine days out of Brest, France when Santa Margarita captured her. Vengeur had previously captured the ship Potomah, which had been sailing from Poole to Newfoundland with a cargo of merchandise; the British recaptured Potomah.

Captain George Parker assumed command of Santa Margarita in December 1796. On 21 June 1797 she captured the Spanish privateer San Francisco off the Irish coast. San Francisco was pierced for 14 guns and had a crew of 53 men. She was from San Sebastián and had cruised between Scilly and Cape Clear for 20 days without having captured anything. She was apparently quite new and sailed well. Parker observed that with better luck she might have done some mischief. Parker went on to have further success against privateers. He captured the 16-gun Adour off Cape Clear on 10 July 1797 and the 16-gun Victorine on 8 August in the same area.

Santa Margarita sailed to the Leeward Islands again in March 1798, and at the end of the year captured the 14-gun privateer Quatorze Juillet. Lloyd's List (LL) reported on 28 May 1799 that the West Indiaman Juno, Watkins, master, had been captured. However, Santa Margarita had recaptured her and sent her into Martinico. Santa Margarita sailed to Jamaica in August 1801, coming under the command of Captain Augustus Leveson-Gower in April 1802, followed by Captain Henry Whitby in 1803.

=== Napoleonic Wars ===
Santa Margarita was on the Irish station in 1804, followed by a period in the Channel between 1804 and 1807 under Captain Wilson Rathbone. She was re-coppered at Plymouth in 1805 and again in 1806, and laid up in ordinary there between 1812 and 1813.

== Fate ==
She was fitted as a lazarette in April 1814 and moved to Pembroke. She became a quarantine ship at Milford between 1814 and 1825, and was fitted out between 1824 and 1826 to allow her to be sailed to Liverpool. She was probably sold there on 8 September 1836 for the sum of £1,710.

== Bibliography ==
- Colledge, J. J.; Warlow, Ben (2006) [1969]. Ships of the Royal Navy: The Complete Record of All Fighting Ships of the Royal Navy from the 15th Century to the Present (3rd Rev ed.). London: Chatham Publishing. ISBN 978-1-86176-281-8. OCLC 67375475.
- Hennequin, Joseph François Gabriel (1835). Biographie maritime ou notices historiques sur la vie et les campagnes des marins célèbres français et étrangers (in French). Vol. 1. Paris: Regnault éditeur.
- Winfield, Rif (2007). British Warships of the Age of Sail 1714–1792: Design, Construction, Careers and Fates. Seaforth. ISBN 978-1-86176-295-5.
