= Syren (1770 ship) =

Great Britain
- Name: Syren
- Owner: British East India Company (EIC)
- Operator: EIC
- Builder: Bombay Dockyard
- Launched: 1770
- Fate: Sold 1778

General characteristics
- Tons burthen: 250 (bm)
- Sail plan: snow (Note: Phipps refers to Syren as a ketch.)

Syren was a snow that the Bombay Dockyard built in 1770 for the EIC. The EIC used her as a packet ship. She made two voyages to England for the EIC before it sold her in 1778.

== Career ==
EIC voyage #1: Captain Edward Berrow left Balambangan Island on 14 February 1774. Syren reached St Helena on 1 June, and arrived at The Downs on 17 August. Berrow had been captain of Royal Captain, which had wrecked on the shoals of Palawan. His officers and crew manned Syren.

EIC voyage #2: Captain Joseph Smith sailed from Portsmouth on 19 January 1775, bound for Bencoolen and Bengal. On 5 February Syren was at Waterford. Lloyd's List reported on 17 February that the "Syren Pqt, Smith, from London to Bengal, is put into Waterford in Distress, having receiv'd considerable Damage." On 7 April she was at Cork for repairs. Once repaired, she was at Falmouth on 28 August. She reached the Cape of Good Hope 22 February 1776 and arrived at Bencoolen on 16 May. She then arrived at Calcutta on 17 July. England bound, she was at Culpee on 29 September. She reached St Helena on 18 January 1777 and arrived at The Downs on 26 April.

== Fate ==
Syren was sold in 1778 as being surplus to requirements. One source states that she was sold into the African slave trade, and renamed African Queen. It further states that on 12 August 1793, after she had landed a cargo of slaves, she was driven out of the harbour at Nevis by a hurricane and foundered. However this appears to be conjecture and currently unverifiable. The pre-eminent database of trans-Atlantic slave trading voyages has no description of a vessel named African Queen that at all conforms to Syren's description. Furthermore, the African Queen that foundered in 1793, first appeared in Lloyd's Register in 1787 and in 1793 was described as built in the East Indies in 1775 and of 376 tons (bm).
