= Action of 11 November 1779 =

1779 battle of the American Revolutionary War

- Part of the American Revolutionary War
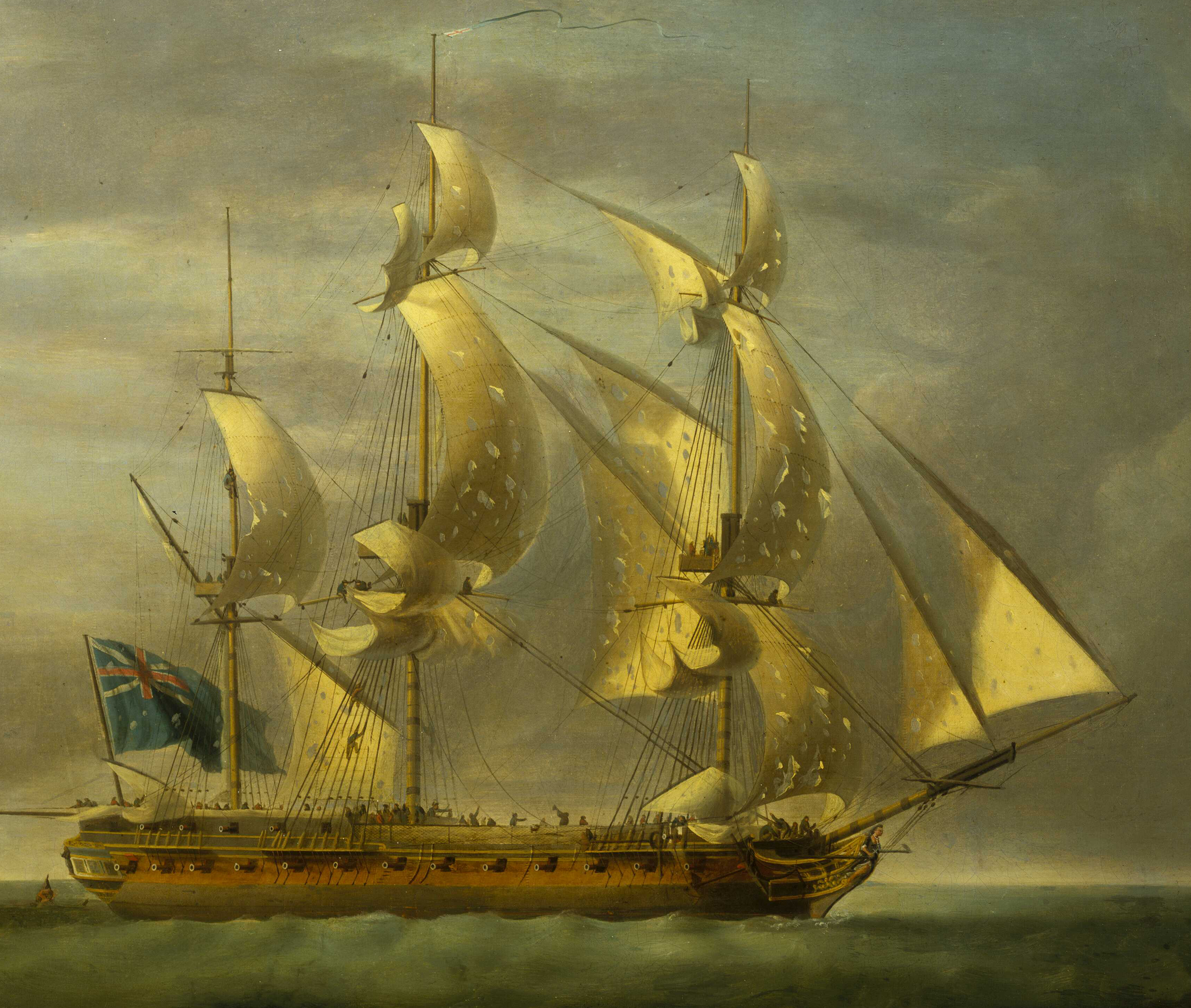
- Painting of Santa Margarita in British service
Date	11 November 1779
Location	Off Lisbon, Atlantic Ocean 38.699°N 9.114°W
Result	British victory

Belligerents
Great Britain	Spain

Commanders and leaders
Alexander Graeme	Andrés de Viana (surrendered)

Strength
1 frigate	1 frigate

Casualties and losses
None	1 killed 3 wounded 1 frigate captured

The action of 11 November 1779 was fought between the Royal Navy frigate HMS Tartar and the Spanish Navy frigate Santa Margarita off Lisbon during the American Revolutionary War.

On 11 November, Captain Alexander Graeme in Tartar, which was part of a squadron under Commodore George Johnstone, was off Lisbon when he sighted the 38-gun Spanish frigate Santa Margarita. Tartar, with the wind behind her, caught up and engaged the Spanish vessel. After around two hours of fighting Santa Margarita was almost dismasted when her captain Andrés de Viana decided to strike the colours.

Santa Margarita was subsequently commissioned into the British navy under her existing name as a 36-gun frigate. She had a very long career, serving until 1836.

== Notes ==
- Allen, Joseph (1853). Battles of the British Navy. Vol. 1. H.G. Bohn.
- Beatson, Robert (1804). Naval and Military Memoirs of Great Britain, From 1727 to 1783. Vol. 6. Longman, Hurst, Rees and Orme.
- Winfield, Rif (2007). British Warships of the Age of Sail 1714–1792: Design, Construction, Careers and Fates. Seaforth. ISBN 978-1-86176-295-5.
