= Essex-class ship of the line =

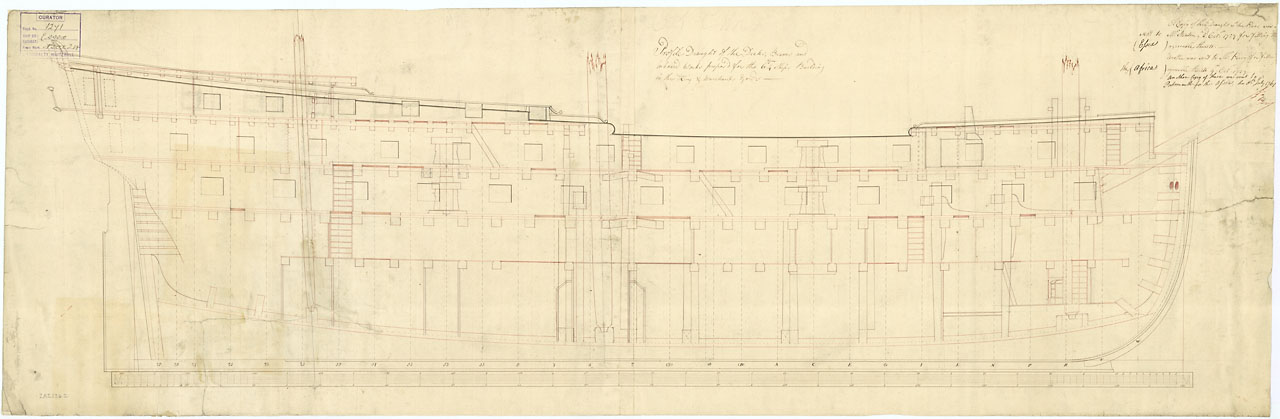
- Essex (1760), Africa (1761)

Class overview
- Name: Essex class
- Operators: Royal Navy
- Succeeded by: St Albans class
- In service: 28 August 1760–1799
- Completed: 2

General characteristics
- Type: Ship of the line
- Length: 158 ft (48 m) (gundeck); 129 ft 9 in (39.55 m) (keel)
- Beam: 44 ft 2 in (13.46 m)
- Propulsion: Sails
- Armament: 64 guns: Gundeck: 26 × 24-pounders; Upper gundeck: 26 × 18-pounders; Quarterdeck: 10 × 4-pounders; Forecastle: 2 × 9-pounders

The Essex-class ships of the line were a class of two 64-gun third rates, designed for the Royal Navy by Sir Thomas Slade.

== Ships ==
- HMS Essex

Builder: Wells and Stanton, Rotherhithe
Ordered: 31 January 1759
Launched: 28 August 1760
Fate: Sold out of the service, 1799

- HMS Africa

Builder: Perry, Blackwall Yard
Ordered: 31 January 1759
Launched: 1 August 1761
Fate: Sold out of the service, 1774
