= Druid-class sloop =

Class overview
- Operators: Royal Navy
- Preceded by: Alderney class
- Built: 1760-1761
- In commission: 1761-1777
- Completed: 2
- Lost: 0

General characteristics (common design)
- Type: Sloop-of-war
- Tons burthen: 208 14/94 bm
- Length: 86 ft 7 in (26.4 m) (gundeck); 72 ft 11 in (22.2 m) (keel)
- Beam: 23 ft 2 in (7.1 m)
- Depth of hold: 9 ft 5 in (2.87 m)
- Sail plan: Snow rig (originally)
- Complement: 100
- Armament: 10 × 4-pounder guns; also 12 x ½-pounder swivel guns

The Druid class was a class of two sloops of wooden construction built for the Royal Navy between 1760 and 1761. Both were built by contract with commercial builders to a common design derived from the Cruizer design of 1732 by Richard Stacey, the Master Shipwright at Deptford dockyard in that era, but with some noticeable differences.

Both were ordered on 19 August 1760, and contracts with the respective builders were agreed on 22 and 25 August. They were two-masted (snow-rigged) vessels, although they were both later reported to be converted to three-masted ship sloops.

Hunter was captured by two American privateers off Boston on 23 November 1775, but was retaken by HMS Greyhound the following day.

== Vessels ==
Name	Ordered	Builder	Launched	Notes
Druid	19 August 1760	John Barnard and John Turner, Harwich	21 February 1761	Sunk as a breakwater at Sheerness in August 1773.
Lynx	10 August 1760	Thomas Stanton, John Wells and William Wells, Rotherhithe	11 March 1761	Sold 14 February 1777 at Sheerness.
