= HMS Africa (1761) =

Ship of the line of the Royal Navy

- Ship plan of Africa

History

Great Britain
- Name: HMS Africa
- Ordered: 31 January 1759
- Builder: Perry, Blackwall Yard
- Launched: 1 August 1761
- Commissioned: September 1761
- Fate: Sold out of the service, 1774

General characteristics
- Class & type: Essex-class ship of the line
- Tons burthen: 135381/94 (bm)
- Length: 158 ft 0 in (48.16 m) (gundeck); 129 ft 6 in (39.47 m) (keel)
- Beam: 44 ft 4 in (13.51 m)
- Depth of hold: 18 ft 10 in (5.74 m)
- Sail plan: Full-rigged ship
- Complement: 500
- Armament: 64 guns: Gundeck: 26 × 24-pounders; Upper gundeck: 26 × 18-pounders; Quarter deck: 10 × 4-pounders; Forecastle: 2 × 9-pounders

HMS Africa was a 64-gun third rate Essex-class ship of the line of the Royal Navy, launched in 1761 and in active service during the latter half of the Seven Years' War against France and Spain.

== Naval career ==
Africa was one of two Essex-class vessels, built according to a design by naval architect Thomas Slade. They were intended to be slightly larger versions of HMS Asia, also designed by Slade but still under construction at the time Africa was launched. Admiralty orders for her construction were issued on 31 December 1758, as part of a general Royal Navy expansion following France's declaration of war earlier in that year. Construction commenced on 7 May 1758 and was completed on 1 August 1761. The vessel was named in November 1759; in selecting her name the Board of Admiralty continued a tradition, dating to 1644, of using well-known geographic features.

The new third-rate was commissioned in September 1761 under Captain Alexander Hood, and assigned to Britain's Mediterranean fleet under Admiral Edward Hawke. She remained at this station for the remainder of the war, returning to England in April 1763 after the Treaty of Paris brought formal hostilities to a close. On arrival at Portsmouth Dockyard she was paid off and her crew dispersed to other vessels. After six months in port she was recommissioned and sent to the Caribbean, where she remained until November 1765. Returning to Portsmouth in that year, she was paid off a second time and left at anchor for the next nine years.

In May 1774 she was declared surplus to Navy needs and sold as timber for £900.

== Bibliography ==
- Winfield, Rif (2007). British Warships of the Age of Sail 1714–1792: Design, Construction, Careers and Fates. Barnsley, United Kingdom: Seaforth. ISBN 9781844157006.
