= Robert Dodd (artist) =

English painter and engraver(1748–1815)

- Born: 1748; England
- Died: 1815 (aged 66–67); London, England
- Education: Unknown
- Known for: Landscape art Marine art

Robert Dodd (1748 – 1815) was an English painter and engraver who specialised in marine art. He is known for his works on the French Revolutionary and Napoleonic Wars.

== Life and family ==
Born as one of three sons of Alexander Dodd, his younger brother was the engineer and painter Ralph Dodd. He married Mary Fulton (b. 1748) on 1 November 1772. He died in early 1815 and was buried on 20 February at St Dunstan and All Saints, Stepney.

== Style ==
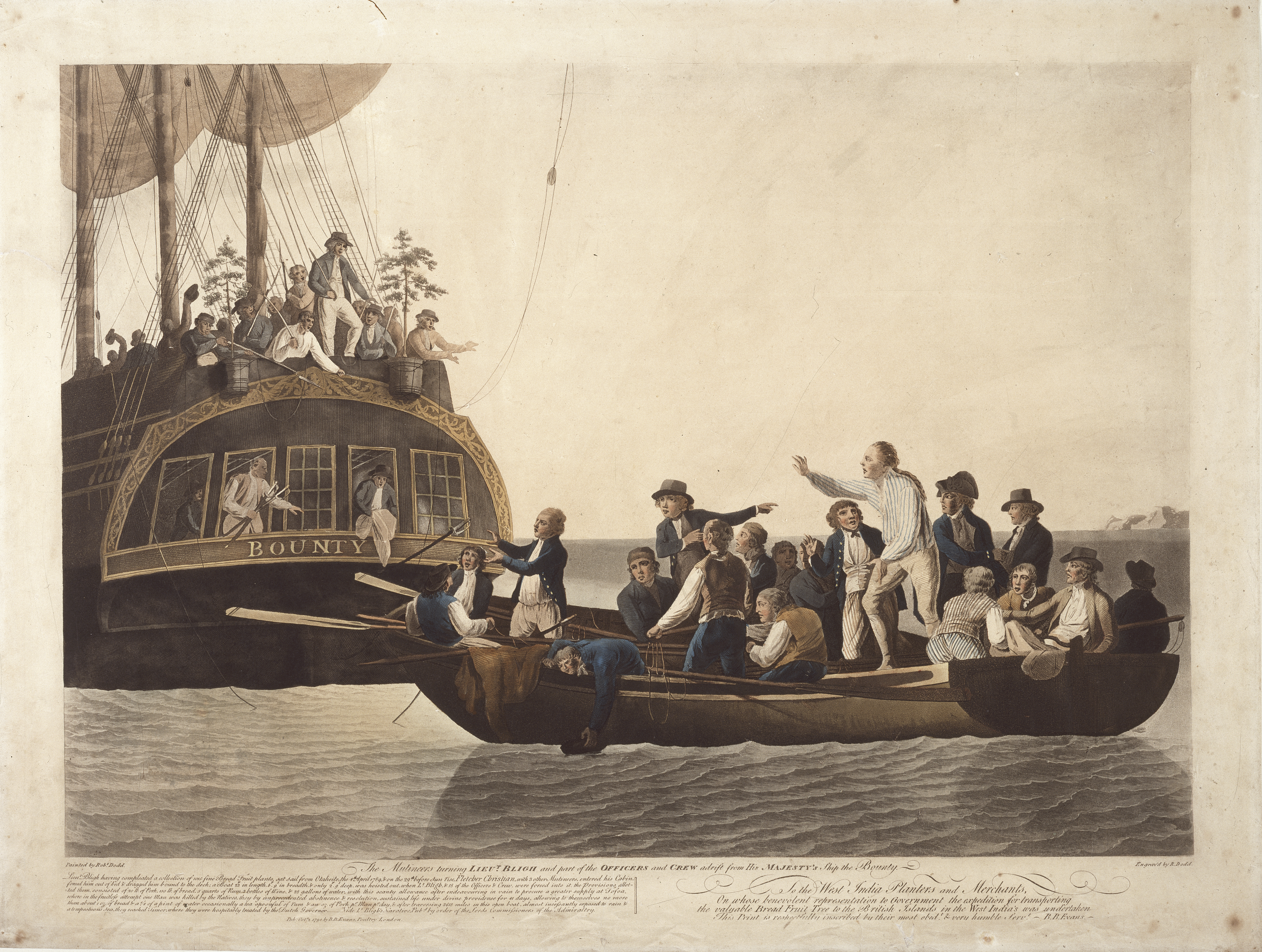
Dodd's best-known work, The mutineers turning Lt Bligh and some of the officers and crew adrift from His Majesty's Ship Bounty, 29 April 1789

Dodd started his career as a landscape painter, but after gaining some recognition in this field, specialised in marine scenes. Living in Wapping, London, he had plenty of material to hand in the way of ships, docks and wharfs, and much of his work includes scenes of the River Thames and naval dockyards. Other themes include battles and actions of the French Revolutionary Wars and the American War of Independence, prominently including a large canvas of the battle of the First of June for the dining room of his local inn, the Half Way House, in Commercial Road, London; the painting is now at the National Maritime Museum.

He exhibited at the Society of Artists in 1780 and the Royal Academy in 1782, continuing to exhibit there regularly until 1809. Although much of his work was subsequently engraved by other artists, he also engraved and published over 100 aquatints of his own work. His use of light effects, particularly the contrasts between the sun's rays and the dark clouds, or the fire against the smoke of battle, convey the drama and activity of a sea battle. Although technically accurate and meticulous, his artistic talents were somewhat eclipsed by the greatest of his peers, and it is his contribution to the historical record that is his greatest legacy.

== Gallery ==
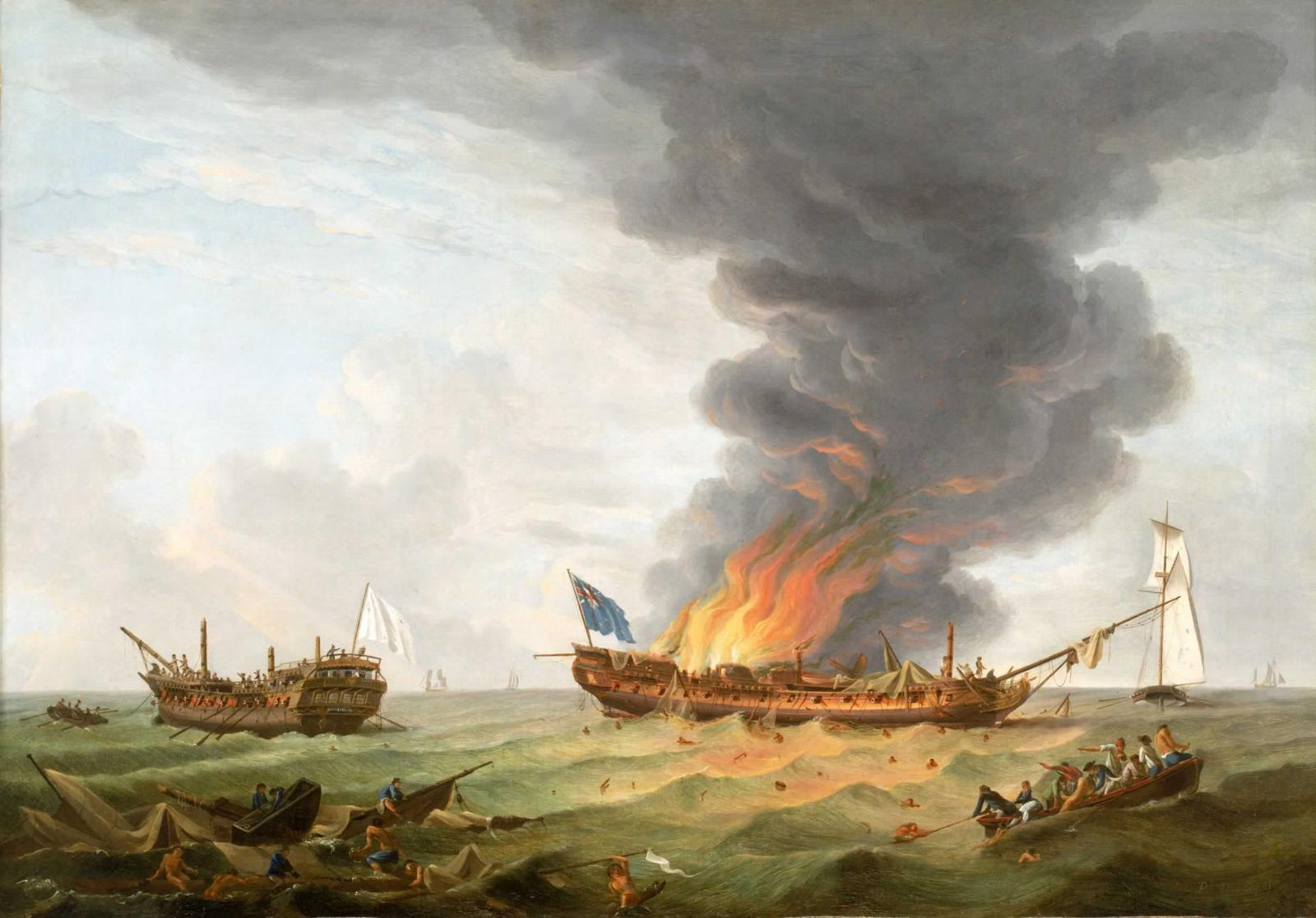
The 'Quebec' and 'Surveillante' in Action, 6 October 1779 (1781)

The capture of the 'Amazone' by HM ship 'Santa Margarita', 29 July 1782 (c. 1783)

Action between the Amazone and HMS Santa Margarita - cutting the prize adrift, 30 July 1782 (c. 1783)

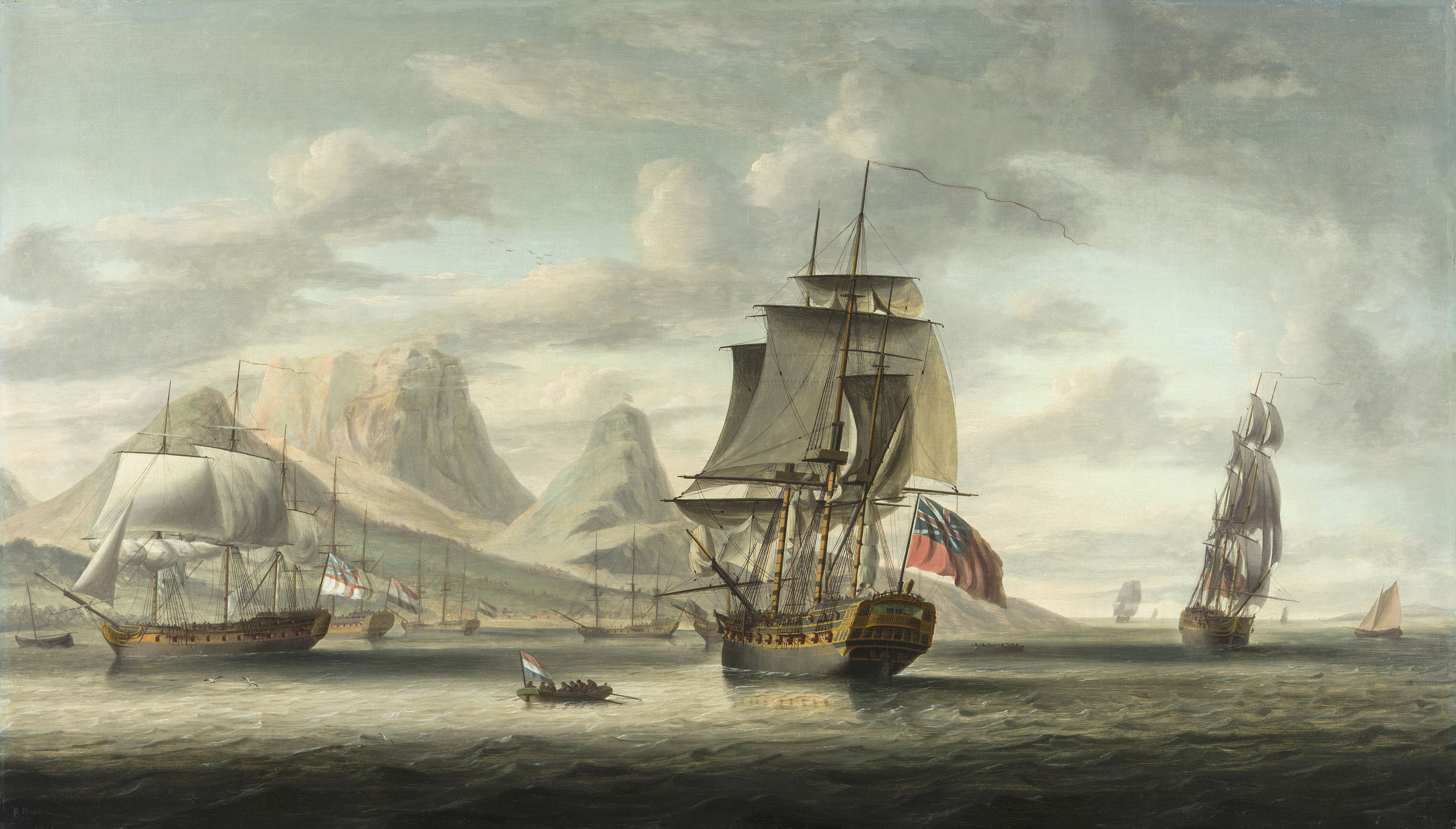
The 'Southampton' with British and Dutch ships In Table Bay, Cape Of Good Hope (1786)

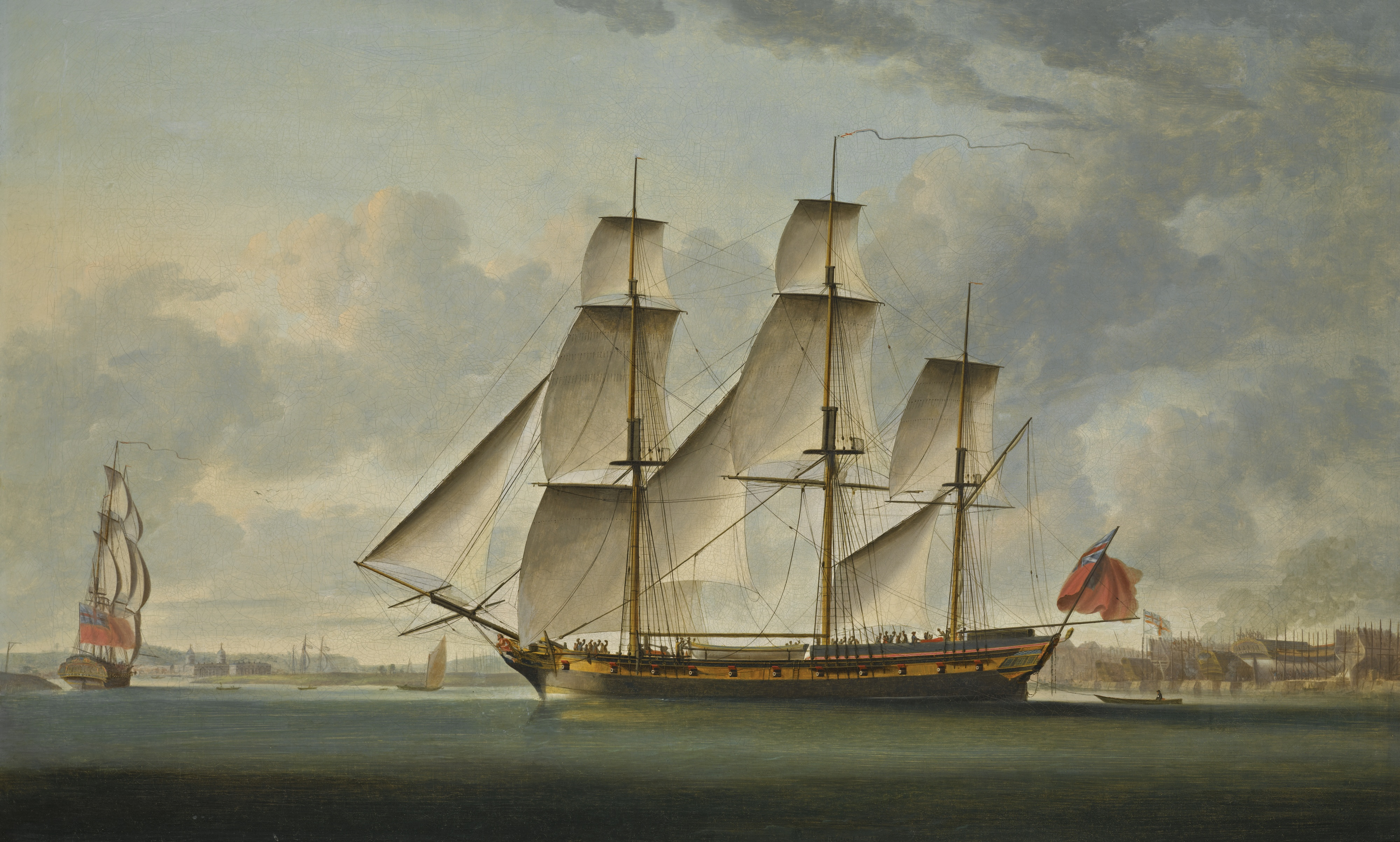
The East Indiaman Delaford, in two positions (1787)

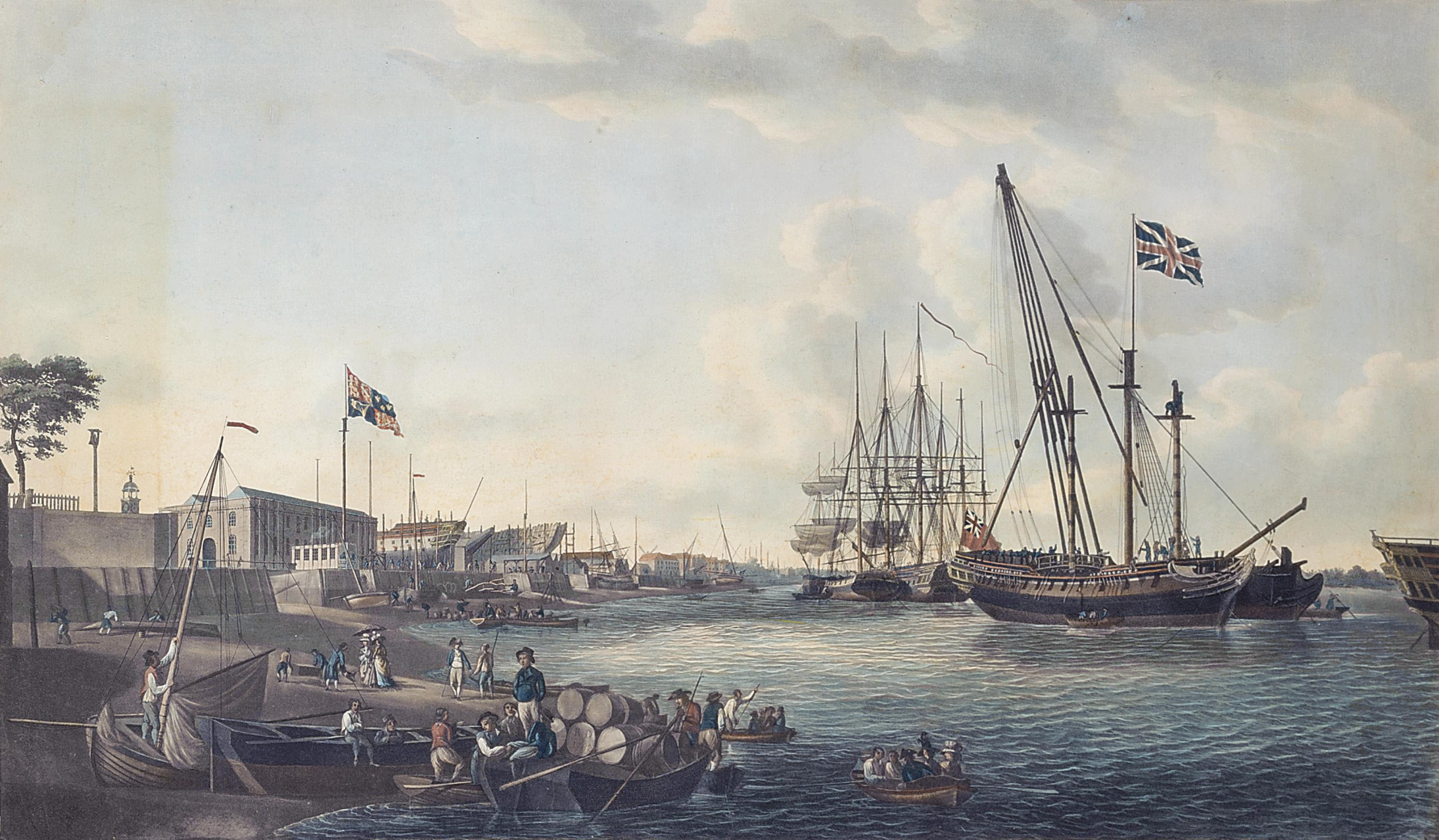
A view of the Royal Dockyard at Deptford (1789)

Nelson Forcing the Passage of the Sound, 30 March 1801, prior to the Battle of Copenhagen (1801)

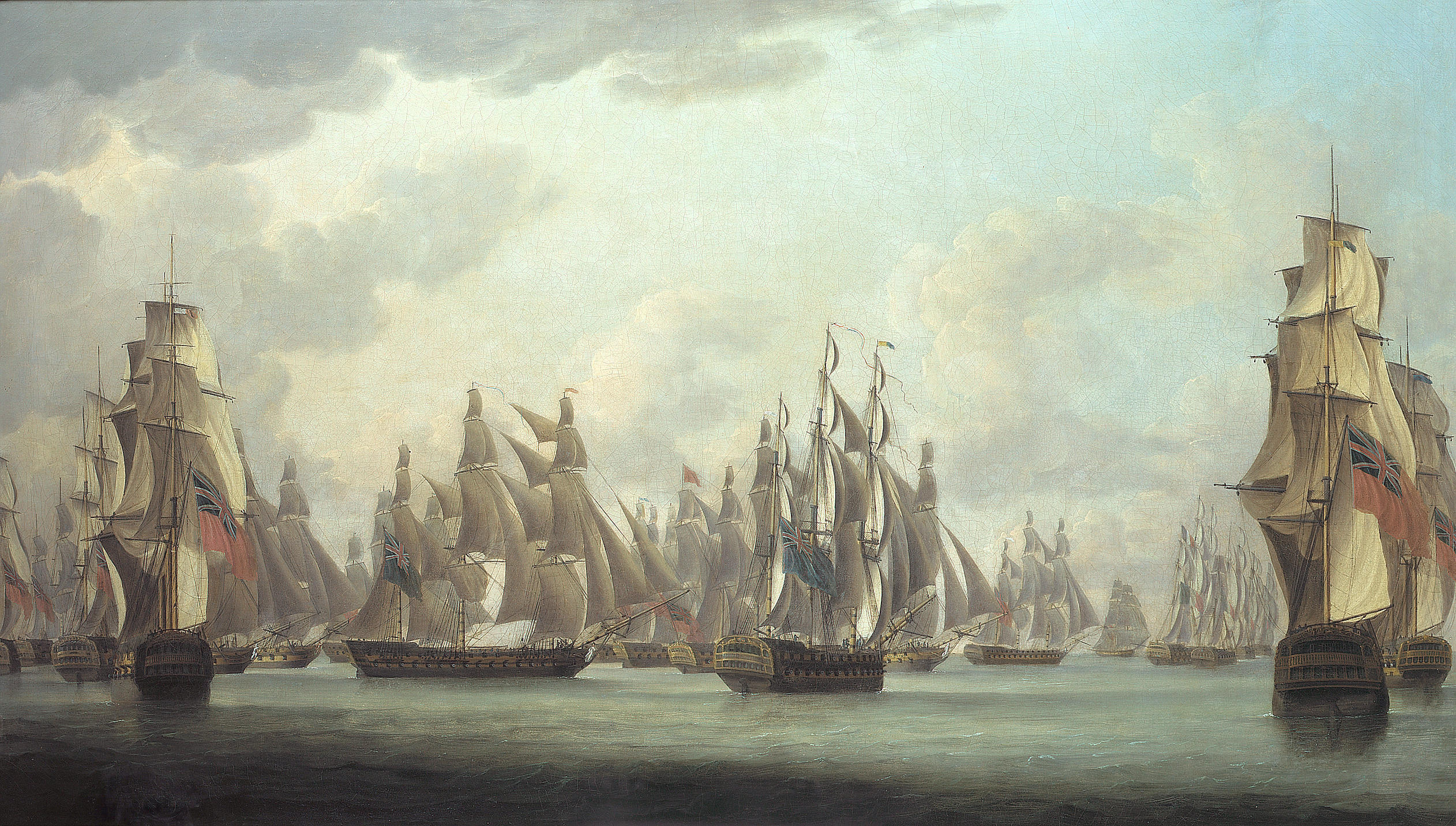
Commodore Dance's celebrated action against a French squadron in the Straits of Malacca on 15th. February 1804 (1804)

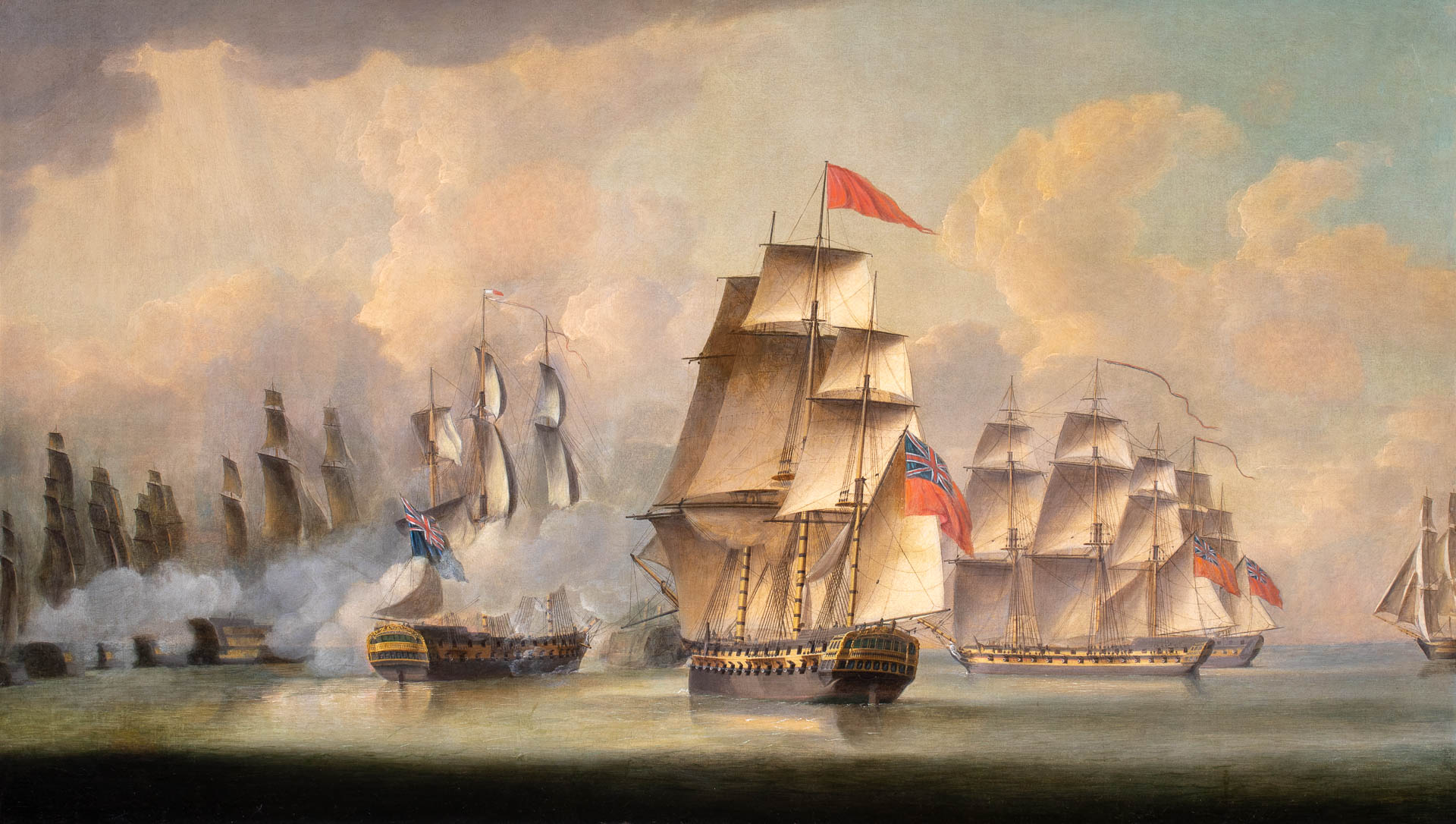
Battle of Pulo Aura, Straits of Malacca on 15th February 1804 (c. 1804)

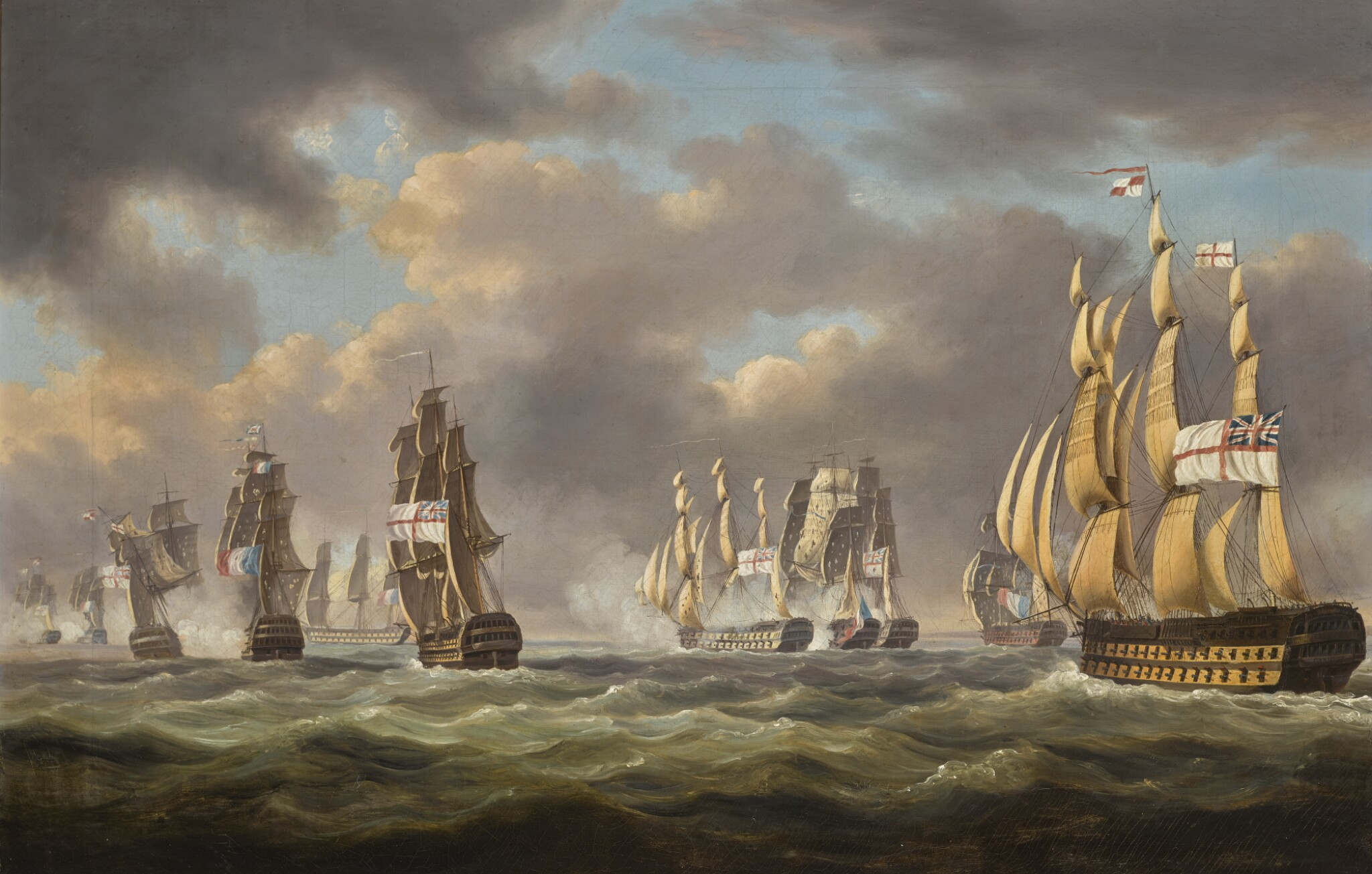
The battle of San Domingo, 6 February 1806 (c. 1806)

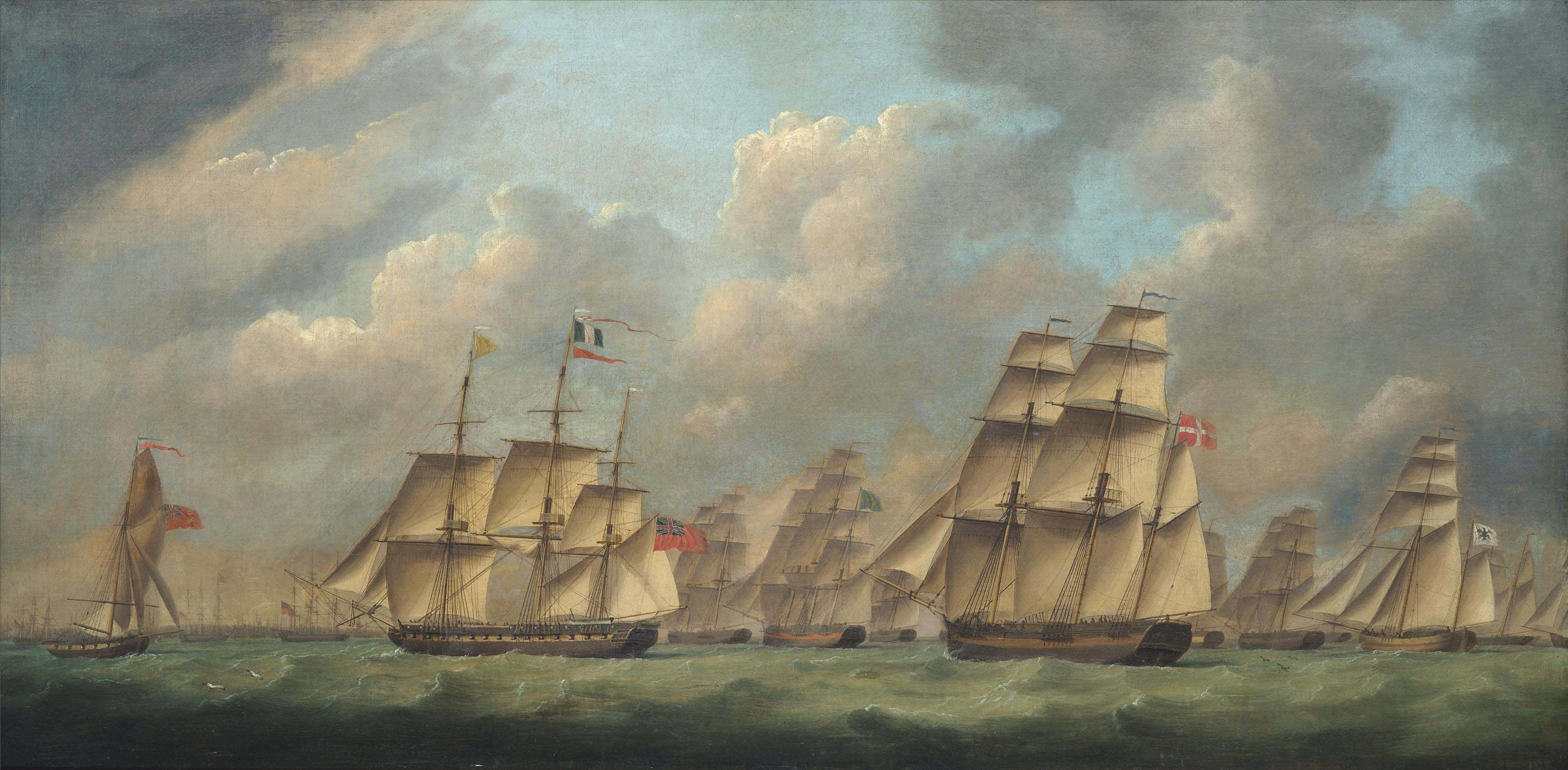
An English frigate escorting a large international merchant convoy (1813)

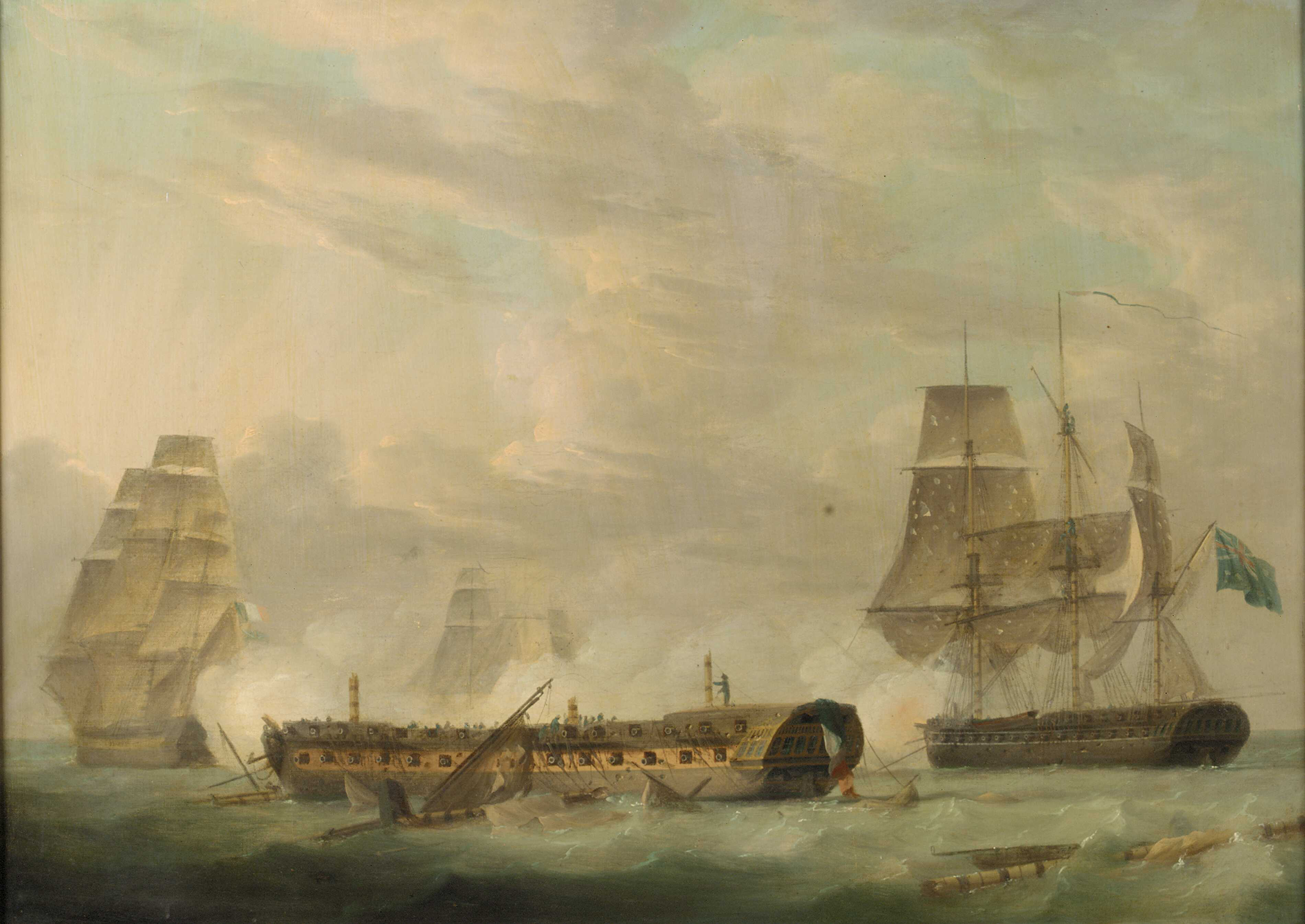
Action at Sea- a French Frigate Completely Dismasted (Date unknown)
