= Royal Captain (1761 ship) =

History

Great Britain
- Name: Royal Captain
- Owner: Sir Richard Hotham
- Operator: East India Company
- Builder: Randall, Rotherhithe
- Launched: 4 February 1761
- Fate: Sold in 1771 for breaking up

General characteristics
- Class & type: East Indiaman
- Tons burthen: 499, (Note: The tonnage is somewhat suspect. Following Queen Anne's charter of 1702, between 1708 and 1747 almost every EIC vessel was registered as being of under 500 tons (bm). The reason was that the charter required every vessel of 500 tons or over to carry a chaplain. Apparently the Directors of the EIC did not feel this was a worthwhile expense.) or 676 (bm)
- Sail plan: Full-rigged ship
- Complement: 99
- Armament: 26 carriage guns

Royal Captain was a three-decked East Indiaman, launched in 1760, that made four voyages for the British East India Company between 1761 and 1771. She was sold 1771 for breaking up.

== Voyages ==
=== Voyage #1 (1761–63) ===
Captain Nathaniel Tanner left Portsmouth on 26 May 1761, bound for Bombay and China. (Note: Nathaniel Tanner had been captain of the privateer Duke of Marlborough during the Seven Years' War.) (Note: Lloyd's Register shows Royal Captain's captain as C. Barrow.) Royal Captain reached Cochin on 12 December, and arrived at Bombay on 2 January 1762. She then sailed to Muscat, which she reached on 19 March, Bandar Abbas (29 March), Muscat again (20 April), and Bombay again (5 May). From there she sailed to Trincomalee, which she reached on 19 June, Madras for the third time (3 July), and finally arrived at Whampoa on 8 November. For her return voyage she crossed the Second Bar, 20 miles or so downriver from Whampoa, on 4 January 1763. However, after the Indiaman Elizabeth caught fire and was destroyed off Lintin Bar in the Canton River on 27 January, Royal Captain took aboard 24 of her crew. The rest of the East Indiamen in China took aboard the rest. Royal Captain reached St Helena 12 April, and arrived at the Downs on 5 July.

=== Voyage #2 (1765–66) ===
Tanner left Portsmouth on 29 January 1765, bound for Madras and China. Royal Captain reached Johanna on 25 May, and arrived at Madras on 25 June. On 9 August she reached Malacca and arrived at Whampoa on 22 September. She crossed the Second Bar on 6 February 1766, reached St Helena on 7 June, and arrived at the Downs on 29 August.

=== Voyage #3 (1768–69) ===
Tanner left the Downs on 7 April 1768, bound for Bombay. She reached Johanna on 1 August and arrived at Bombay on 27 August. After she left Bombay, she reached Tellicherry on 15 December, Cochin on 22 December, Anjengo on 26 December, St Helena on 6 March 1769, and the Downs on 26 May.

=== Voyage # 4 (1770–71) ===
Captain Edward Barrow (or Berrow), left Portsmouth on 22 February 1770, bound for Benkulen and China. She reached the Cape on 20 May, Benkulen on 15 July, and Whampoa on 10 September. Homeward bound, she crossed the Second Bar on 31 December, reached St Helena on 9 April 1771, and arrived at the Downs on 8 July.

== Fate ==
Royal Captain was sold in 1771 for breaking up.
