= Plane Island =

Island in Tunisia

Île Plane الجزيرة المنبسطة
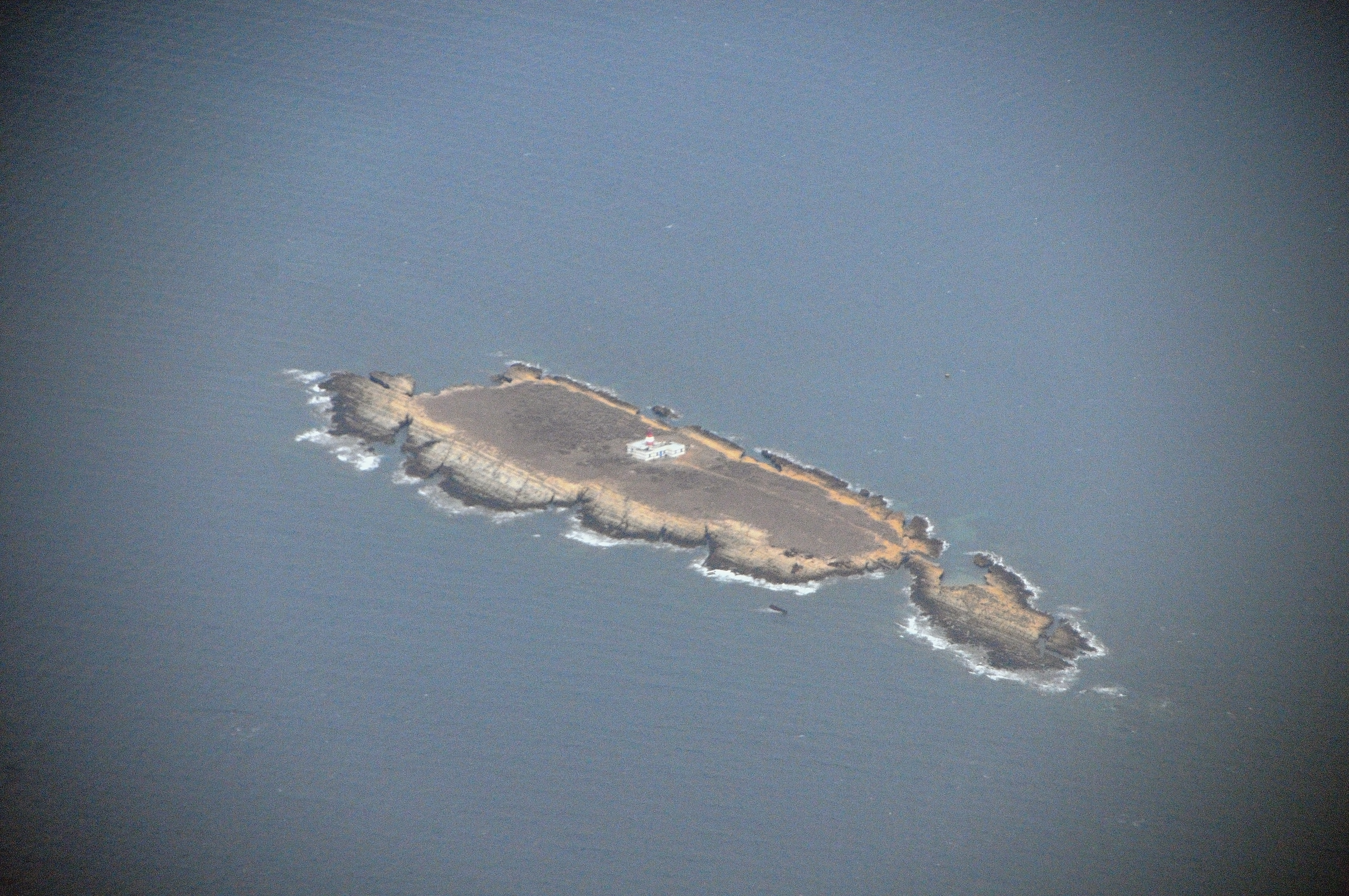
- Plane Island, seen from the north in 2010

- Location within Tunisia

Geography
- Coordinates: 37°10′53.8″N 10°19′42.3″E

Administration
- Tunisia

Plane Island (French: Île Plane; Latin: Phalans Insula) also known as Piana or Plana Island and—in Tunisian Arabic—as Jaziret el-Monbasta (Standard Arabic: الجزيرة المنبسطة, al-Jazira al-Munbasita), is a flat, rocky island in the Mediterranean Sea roughly 3.75 kilometers (2.3 mi) off Cape Farina, Tunisia. It has a lighthouse.

== History ==
Plane Island is possibly the "Terapse" or "Phalans Island" (Latin: Phalans Insula) of ancient geographers.

During the Napoleonic Wars, an error in navigation caused Captain Charles Tyler to wreck the captured frigate L'Aigle on Plane Island in July 1798 while operating against the French and pirates in the area. All of the crew were saved, and Captain Tyler was not held liable for the loss.

After the establishment of French control over Tunisia, Ernest Cosson studied the plant life on Plane Island in May, 1888.

The Belgian ship Scheldepas ran aground off Plane Island on March 14, 1929. The crew was rescued by the British ship Tabarka. The Greek ship Michael L. Embricios ran aground on Plane Island on November 22, 1931. 30 crew were rescued by the German ship Alaya.

The sea lanes around Plane Island were mined by the Allies during the Second World War. As part of Operation Retribution, the Allied blockade of Axis attempts to flee from occupied Tunisia to Sicily, HMS Lookout captured 13 Germans and Italians off Plane Island on 13 May 1943. A little later, HMS Laforey—en route from repairs in Malta—stopped by Plane Island, discovering 23 Axis soldiers and taking them prisoner.

== Lighthouse ==
The island's lighthouse has the designation numbers ARLHS TUN-024, Admiralty E6414, and NGA 22056.

It was erected by the French colonial authorities in 1888. It is a square tower with white and red bands, rising from its keeper's house. The tower stands 12 meters (39 ft) high. Its red lantern remains in use. It flashes twice every 10 seconds with a focal-plane height of 20 meters (65 ft); it is visible for 20–28 kilometers (11–15 nmi).

== Transportation ==
The island remains accessible only by boat. It is closed to the public.

== Gallery ==
A French topological map of the Gulf of Tunis, showing Plane Island as Île Plane

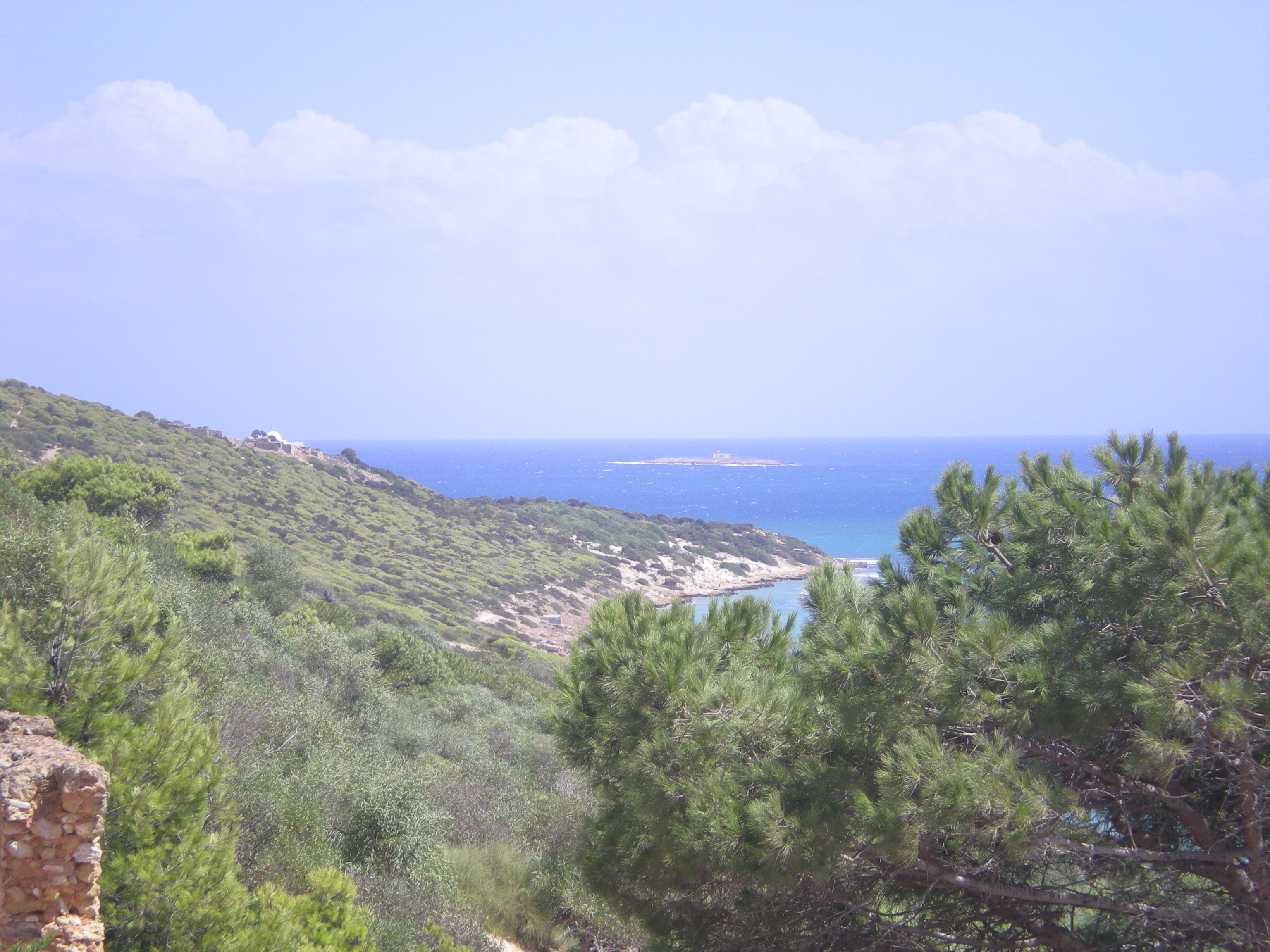
The view of Plane Island from Cape Farina's mountains to the west

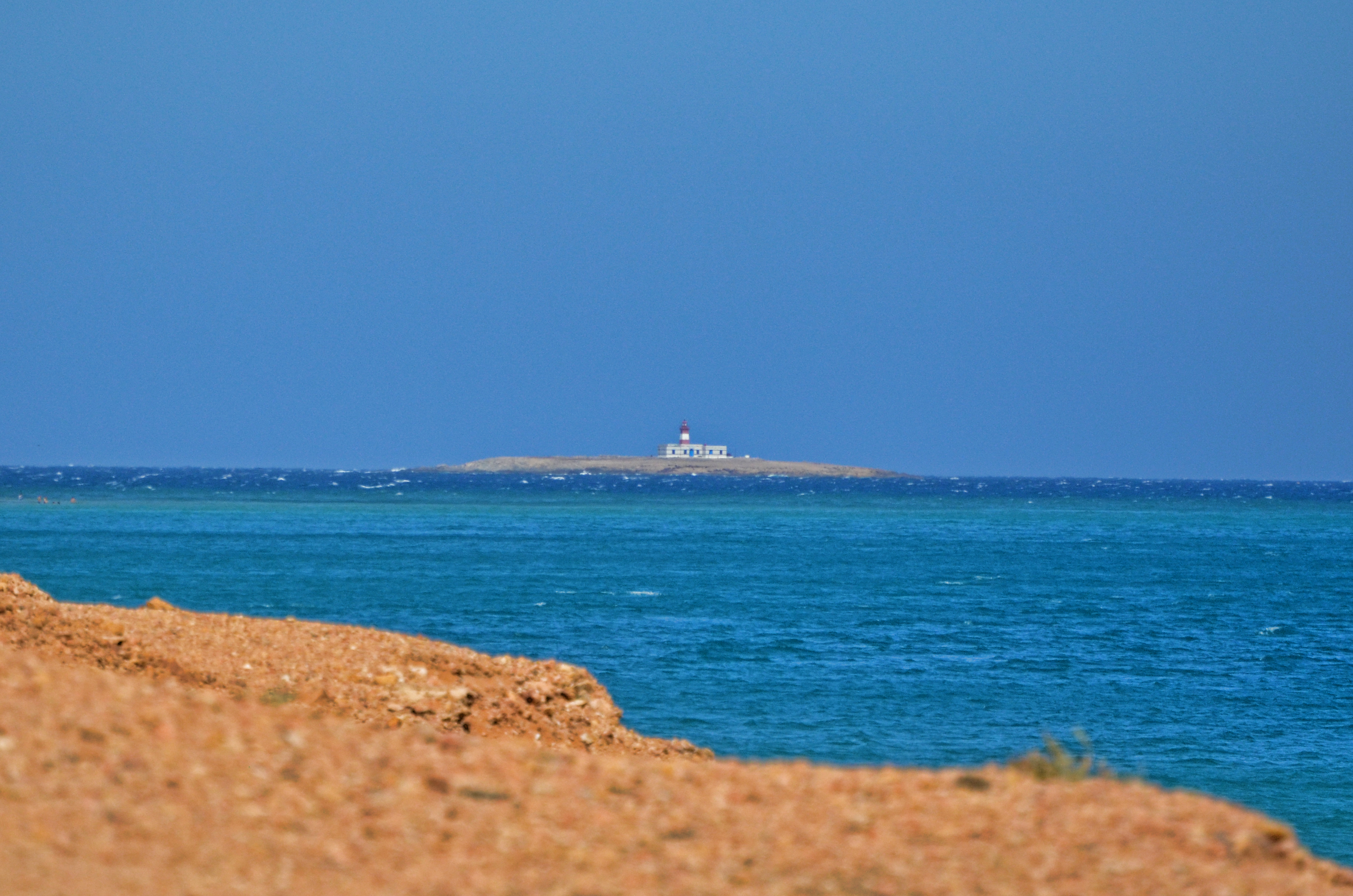
The view of Plane Island from Cape Farina's beach

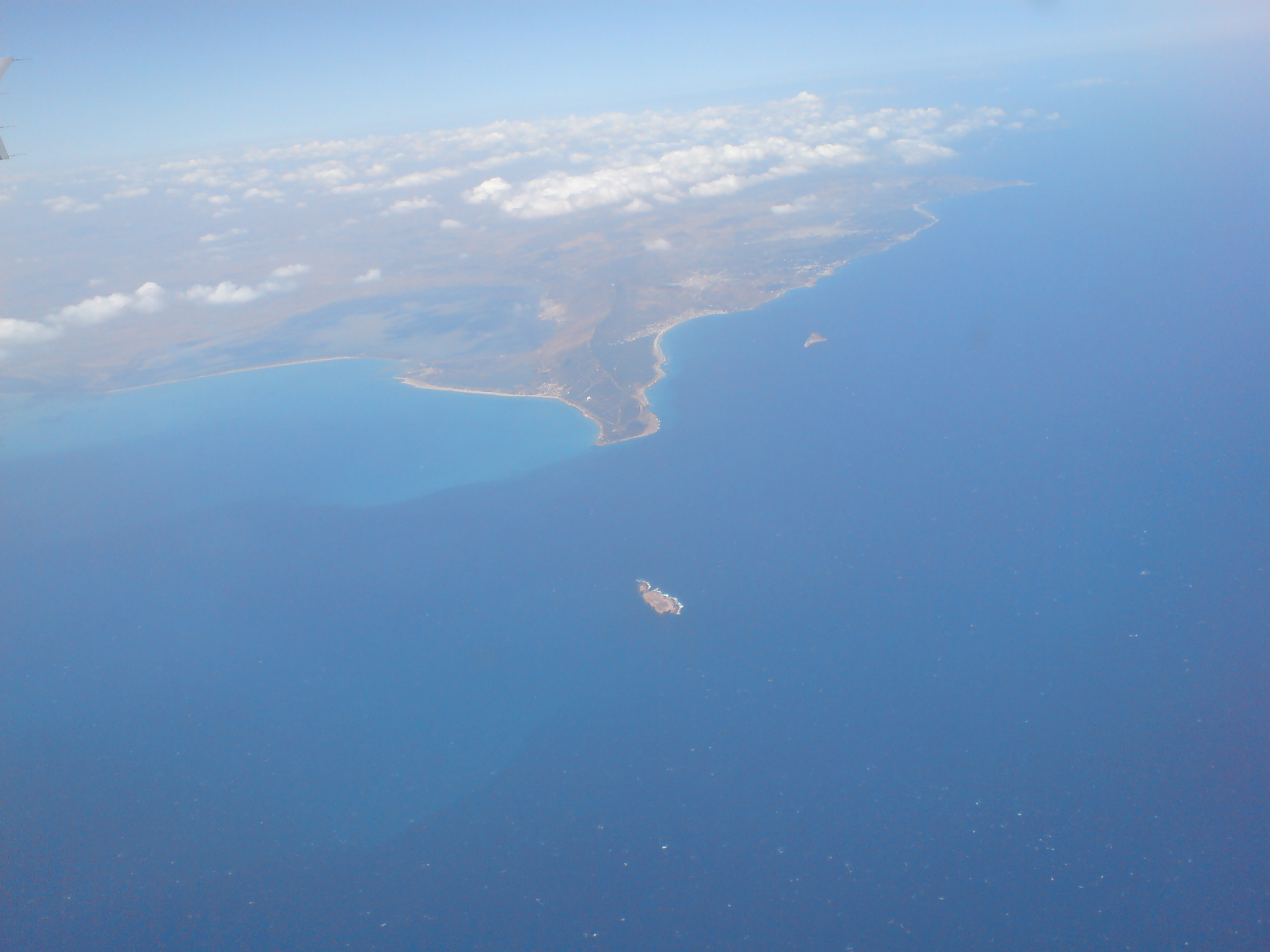
An aerial view from the east

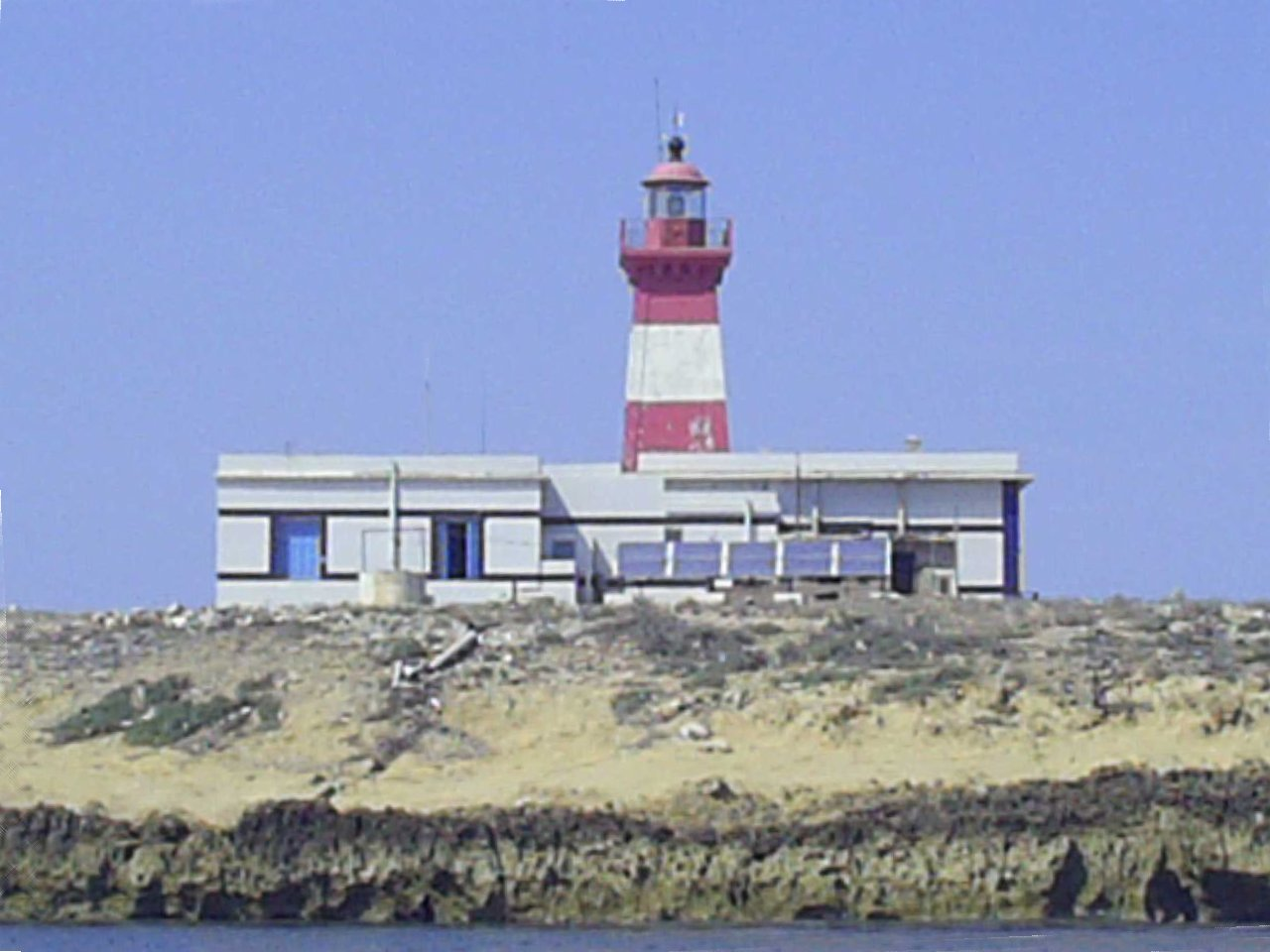
The lighthouse
