= Richard Goodwin Keats =

Royal Navy officer and colonial administrator (1757–1834)

Admiral Sir Richard Goodwin Keats GCB
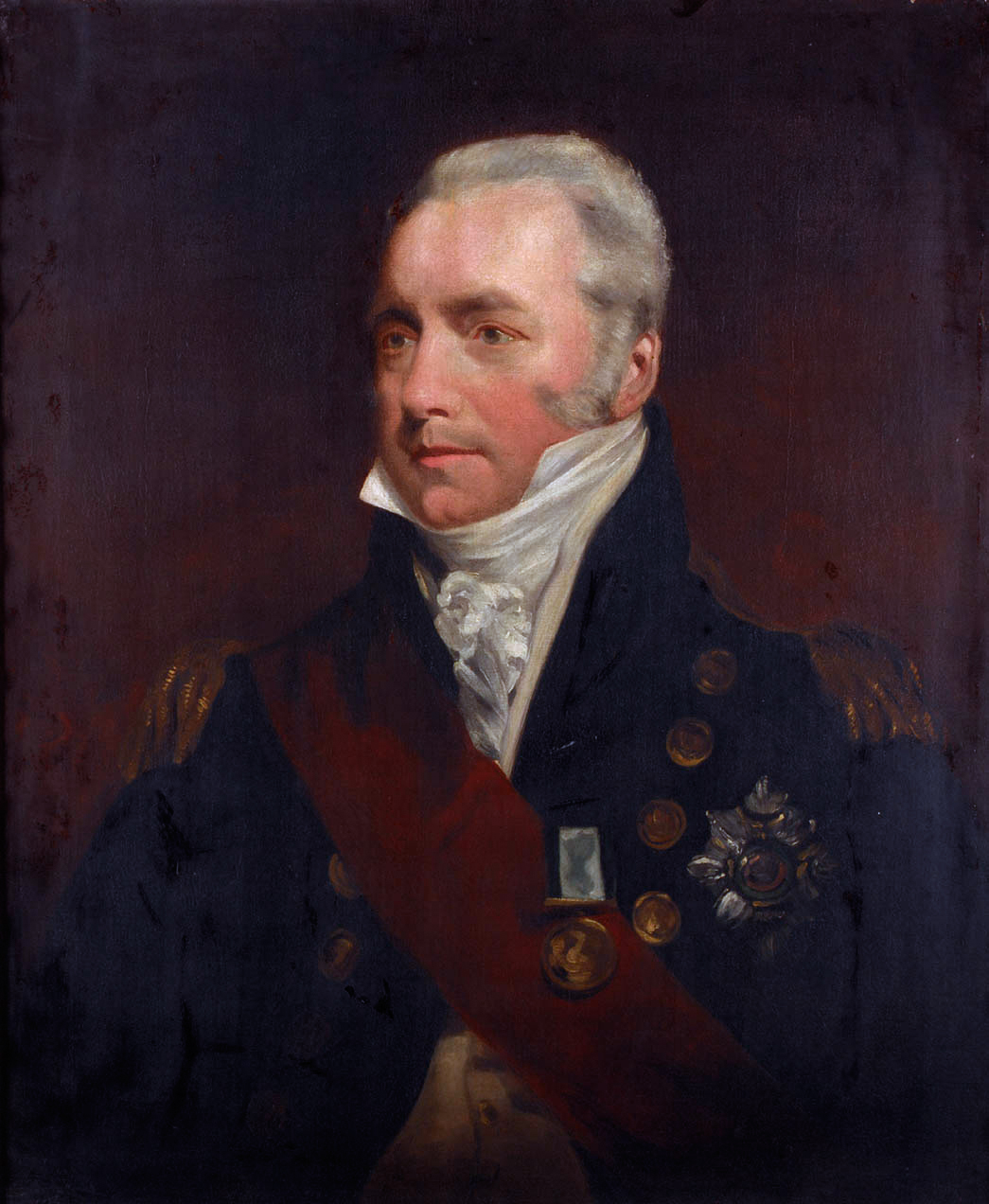
- Portrait by John Jackson, 1817

40th Governor of Newfoundland
- In office 1813–1816
- Preceded by: Sir John Duckworth
- Succeeded by: Francis Pickmore

Governor of Greenwich Hospital
- In office 1821–1834
- Preceded by: Sir John Colpoys
- Succeeded by: Sir Thomas Hardy

Personal details
- Born: 16 January 1757 Chalton, Hampshire
- Died: 5 April 1834 (aged 77) Greenwich Hospital, London
- Military career
- Allegiance: Great Britain; United Kingdom
- Branch: Royal Navy
- Service years: 1770–1812
- Rank: Admiral of the White
- Commands: HMS Rhinoceros; HMS Bonetta; HMS Southampton; HMS Niger; HMS London; HMS Galatea; HMS Boadicea; HMS Superb; HMS Ganges; Governor of Newfoundland
- Conflicts: American War of Independence; Battle of Ushant (1778); Battle of Cape St. Vincent (1780); Battle of Grenada; Battle of Martinique (1780); French Revolutionary Wars; Algeciras campaign; Second Battle of Algeciras Bay; Napoleonic Wars; Battle of San Domingo; Battle of Copenhagen (1807); Walcheren Campaign

Viceregal styles of Sir Richard Goodwin Keats
- Reference style: His Excellency
- Spoken style: Your Excellency

Admiral of the White Sir Richard Goodwin Keats, GCB (16 January 1757 – 5 April 1834) was a Royal Navy officer and colonial administrator who served in the American War of Independence and French Revolutionary and Napoleonic Wars. He retired in 1812 due to ill health and was made Commodore-Governor of Newfoundland, serving from 1813 to 1816. In 1821 Keats was made Governor of Greenwich Hospital in Greenwich, London. He held the post until his death at Greenwich in 1834. Keats is remembered as a capable and well respected officer, in particular due to his actions at the Algeciras campaign.

== Early life ==
Keats was born at Chalton, Hampshire the son of Rev. Richard Keats, the curate, later Rector of Bideford and King's Nympton in Devon and Headmaster of Blundells School, Tiverton, by his wife, Elizabeth. His formal education was brief. At the age of nine, in 1766, he entered New College School, Oxford and was then admitted briefly to Winchester College in 1768 but lacked scholastic aptitude and determined on a career in the Royal Navy.

== Early naval career ==
Keats entered the navy as a midshipman in 1770 aboard the 74-gun HMS Bellona under Captain John Montagu and followed Montagu when he was promoted rear admiral, given command of the North American Station and the governorship at Halifax. He served in a number of ships on the Newfoundland Station under his patron and his patron's son Captain James Montagu.

In April 1777 he was promoted to lieutenant under Captain Robert Digby in HMS Ramillies in which he took part in the First Battle of Ushant on 27 July 1778. As one of Digby's followers he was moved with him to the second-rate, ninety-gun HMS Prince George. Prince William Henry, later William IV, served aboard Prince George as a midshipman for almost two years during this time where Keats was the second, then first lieutenant of his watch. The two formed a life-long friendship, William describing Keats as the one to whom he owed all his professional knowledge.

In 1780 Keats was on Prince George with Admiral Rodney's fleet when the San Julien struck to her at the Moonlight Battle before they proceeded to the relief of Gibraltar. Keats was with the fleet once more when it again relieved the beleaguered rock in 1781. In September 1781 Keats returned to the North American station with Digby in HMS Lion.

== Command ==
On 18 January 1782 Keats was put in command of the store ship HMS Rhinoceros which was later fitted out as a floating battery in the defense of New York City. By May 1782 he had been transferred to the command of the sloop HMS Bonetta. He was part of the squadron that in the action of 15 September 1782 captured a French squadron including the 38-gun Aigle which was bought into British service. Keats played a pivotal role in the engagement, taking responsibility for his ship when the pilot refused to proceed in shallow waters, chasing the French up the Delaware river for two whole days before they grounded and were forced to surrender. Keats was subsequently engaged at New York and Nova Scotia until Bonetta was paid off in 1785 and between then and 1789 Keats was unemployed ashore and for much of the time lived in France.

On 24 June 1789 he was promoted to post-captain in HMS Southampton, possibly at the behest of the Duke of Clarence (Prince William Henry) as a royal favour to a friend. They were engaged in cruises of observation in the chops of the Channel and a voyage to Gibraltar conveying Prince Edward to his new command, in effective banishment. Between 1790 and 1793 Keats commanded the frigate HMS Niger on the Channel Station.

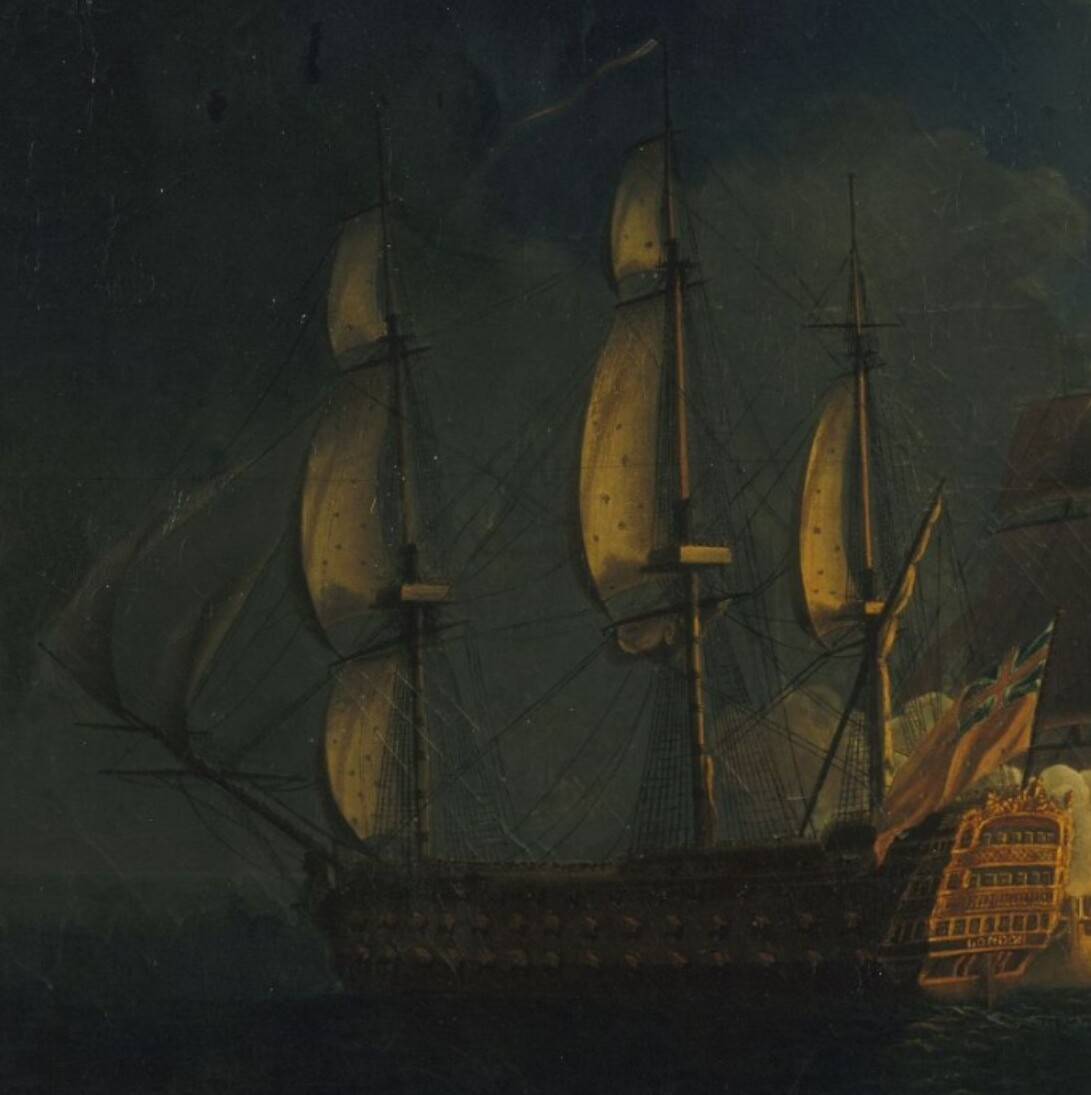
HMS London, which Keats captained from 1793 to 1794

Being based in Portsmouth under the orders of Lord Hood he sat under his lordship's presidency on the famous Court Martial of the mutineers who had taken HMS Bounty from Lieutenant William Bligh in the Pacific Ocean in 1789. He commissioned HMS London in 1793 as the newly appointed flag-captain to the Duke of Clarence but was to be disappointed when the Board of Admiralty determined that it would be inappropriate for the Prince to be in command and recalled him to London, such that Keats and the London sailed without him in Lord Howe's squadron. London was paid off in March 1794.

== Western Frigate Squadron ==
In 1794 Keats was in Sir John Borlase Warren's squadron in the Channel in command of the 32-gun frigate HMS Galatea. In her he took part in the running battles along the French, English and Irish coasts that became highly publicized and exemplified the romantic image of naval warfare as it was perceived by the general public. In 1795 Galatea captured La Revolutionnaire.

In the same year Galatea took part in the failed landing of an invasion force at Quiberon Bay. The invasion force consisted of French Royalist émigré, counter-revolutionary troops in support of the Chouannerie and Vendée Revolt. They were landed by the Royal Navy on 23 June. The aim of the invasion was to raise the whole of western France in revolt, bring an end to the French Revolution and restore the French monarchy. The Landing of the émigrés at Quiberon was finally repulsed on 21 July, dealing a disastrous blow to the royalist cause.

On 23 August 1795 Keats in Galatea drove the French frigate Andromaque of 42 guns ashore and set her alight to stop the French refloating her. The squadron was cruising near the entrance to the Garonne when she hove in sight. Notwithstanding the difficulty of the navigation, and although his French pilot declared his incapacity to conduct the ship through the shoals and refused to continue, Keats took charge and chased the enemy through a night of rain squalls and lightning right over the shoals of Arcachon Bay on which she struck and was immediately wrecked early the following morning. Thus far the Galatea had acted alone, but in the morning she was joined by the Artois and Sylph, the latter of which fired into the bottom of the French frigate to prevent her re-floating and whose men assisted in setting her on fire. Exploits such as this, demonstrating Keats's character in the face of shoal waters, set him apart as one of the few suitable for inshore blockade work off dangerous shores.

In May 1797 Galatea was at the Nore anchorage, and Keats, along with several other captains, was put ashore during the fleet mutiny.

Subsequently, he commissioned the newly built 40-gun HMS Boadicea. Under Keats she served on the Channel station for several years during which time she was engaged watching the port of Brest and at times cruising for prizes by way of reward for the arduous work of blockade. She captured a great many prizes. The first was the 22-gun Spanish ship Union, which she captured on 14 August 1797. On 9 December 1798 Boadicea captured the 20-gun French privateer L'Invincible General Bonaparte. The Admiralty took this vessel into service as the 18-gun sloop HMS Brazen. On 1 April 1799 Keats also captured L'Utile, a brig of 16 guns. During this time Keats was stationed mainly off Brest. He continued there until 1800 when he was reassigned by Earl St. Vincent to Ferrol. Further prizes included Le Milan of 14 guns, the brig Le Requin of 18 guns, the Venus of 32 guns and 200 men, and a large number of merchant ships. The most valuable of these was the Cultivator, a West Indiaman with cargo valued at £20,000.

== HMS Superb and the Algeciras campaign ==
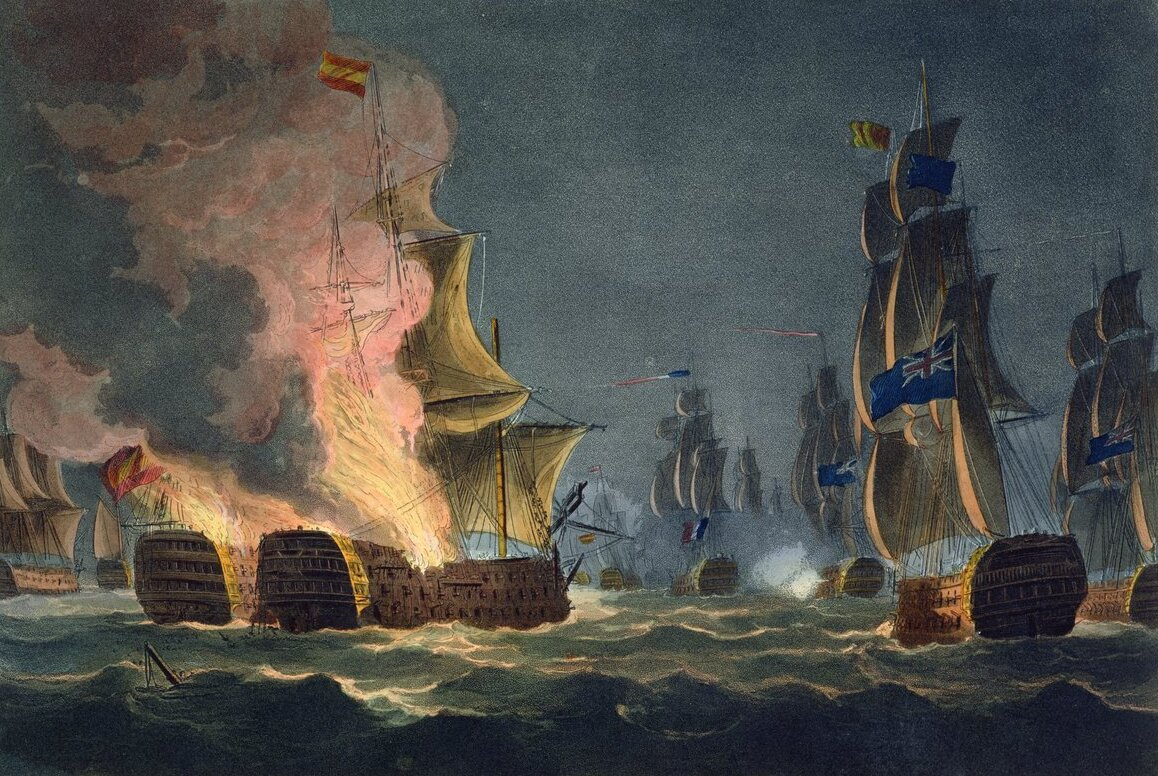
Real Carlos and San Hermenegildo on fire at the Second Battle of Algeciras due to Keat's efforts

By March 1801 Keats was placed in command of the ship with which he is most associated. HMS Superb was a 74-gun third-rate ship-of-the-line ordered in 1795 and completed in 1798. In July 1801 she was stationed off Cádiz and took part in the Second Battle of Algeciras. As the French and Spanish made to escape Algeciras Bay for Cádiz, Admiral Sir James Saumarez hailed Superb and ordered Keats to catch the Franco-Spanish's fleet rear and engage. Superb was a relatively new ship and had not been long on blockade duty. As a consequence she was the fastest sailing ship-of-the-line in the fleet. As night fell and the wind in the Straits increased to a fresh gale the Superb went at 11.5 knots. Keats rapidly gained on the combined fleet, leaving his compatriots some miles astern.

With lights concealed, and making no signals, he sailed Superb alongside the 112-gun Real Carlos on her starboard side. Another Spanish ship, the 112-gun San Hermenegildo, was sailing abreast, on the port side, of Real Carlos. Keats fired three broadsides into Real Carlos before any return of fire, so unexpected was the attack. Some shot passed through the rigging of Real Carlos and struck San Hermenegildo. Real Carlos caught fire and Keats disengaged her to continue up the line. In the darkness the two Spanish ships confused one another for British ships and began a furious duel. With Real Carlos aflame the captain of San Hermenegildo determined to take advantage and crossed the stern of Real Carlos in order to deal a fatal broadside that would run the length of the ship through the unprotected stern. A sudden gust of wind brought the two ships together and entangled their rigging.

San Hermenegildo also caught fire and the two enormous three-deck ships eventually exploded. Superb continued on relatively unscathed and engaged the French 74-gun Saint Antoine under Commodore Julien le Ray. Saint Antoine struck after a fierce exchange of broadsides.^{[a]} The action came to an end with the intervention of Captain Amable Troude aboard Formidable. Troude placed his ship, which had been damaged in the earlier engagement and could not keep up with the main allied fleet, between the escaping allied fleet and the British. He held off four ships, causing significant damage to HMS Venerable, which grounded, before he escaped into Cádiz. Both Troude and Keats were highly praised by their commanders and the general public. Troude received an audience with Napoleon. Nelson said of Keats in a letter to the Duke of Clarence: "Our friend Keats is quite well in his own person he is equal in my estimation to an additional Seventy-four; his life is a valuable one to the State, and it is impossible that your Royal Highness could ever have a better choice of a Sea friend, or Counsellor, if you go to the Admiralty."

Following the signing of the Treaty of Amiens in 1802, Keats and Superb remained in the Mediterranean under Admiral Sir Richard Bickerton. When Nelson relieved Bickerton and took command of the fleet in the Mediterranean Keats remained with him off Toulon. When not watching the French they were sent on a variety of missions – to Naples to secure supplies, during which voyage they surveyed a passage through the Straits of Bonifacio, separating Corsica and Sardinia and three diplomatic missions to Algiers to negotiate with Mustafa Baba, Dey of Algiers to secure reinstatement of British consular representation, the release of ships taken contrary to treaty, and the freedom of enslaved sailors. He accompanied the fleet to the West Indies in 1805 in the famous chase of Admiral Villeneuve that culminated in the Battle of Trafalgar. After the fleet's return to European waters, Superb was sent to Portsmouth to re-fit. Having been at sea for four years without being in a home port she was described by Nelson as "her stem and the knees of her head are loose and broke – nothing but the great exertions of captain Keats has kept her at sea..." Unfortunately, she did not rejoin the fleet off Cádiz until November 1805, missing the Battle of Trafalgar, where Keats was to have been Nelson's second, by less than a month. On 9 November 1805 Keats was made an honorary Colonel of Marines.

== The West Indies and the Battle of San Domingo ==
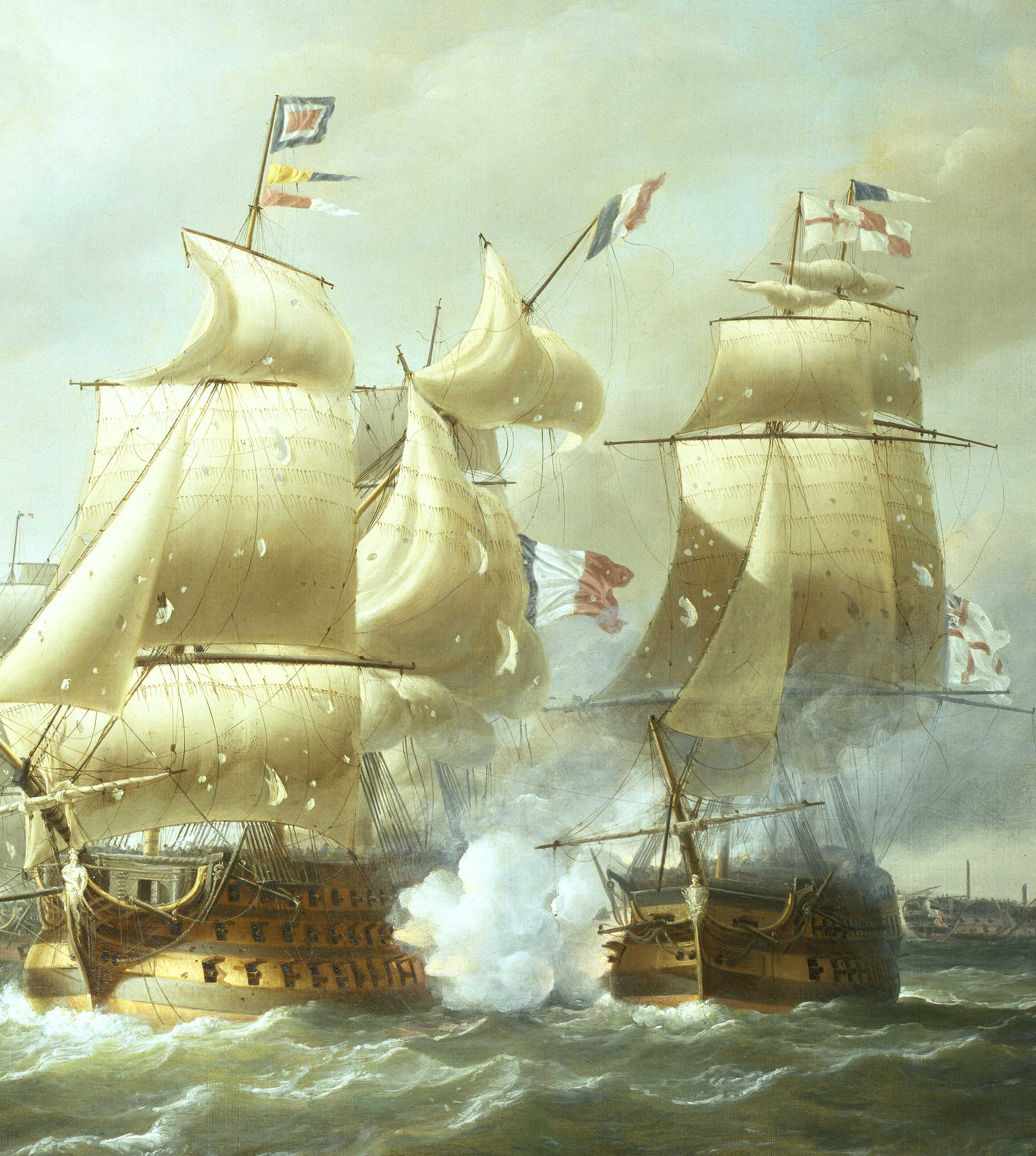
HMS Superb (right) under Keats at the Battle of San Domingo

Admiral John Duckworth took Superb as his flagship in October 1805. Having orders to blockade the remaining French ships sheltering in Cádiz, Duckworth abandoned the blockade in search of a French squadron reported to be off Madeira. By the time Duckworth made it south, that squadron (under Rear Admiral Zacharie Allemand) was long gone. He then came across and chased Contre-Admiral Jean-Baptiste Willaumez, the Superb gaining to within five to seven miles of the fleeing French squadron on Christmas morning. At 10:00 am the Superb cleared for battle, but his fleet now being quite dispersed, Duckworth, to the surprise and disappointment of the men, called off the chase. His actions can be contrasted with Keats's daring approach of the enemy in the Second Battle of Algeciras.

Now in the mid-Atlantic with insufficient supplies to work back to Cádiz, they headed to the West Indies. Vice-Admiral Corentin Urbain Leissègues had separated from Willaumez in the Atlantic and made for Santo Domingo to resupply and refit after a storm. Duckworth was in the process of resupplying his ships at St. Kitts when he learned of the French squadron anchored in Santo Domingo. Duckworth took his squadron of seven line-of-battle ships and attacked Leissègues' five ships of the line.

The Battle of San Domingo was the last open sea fleet action of the Napoleonic War. During the battle Superb suffered 62 casualties in what became an almost total victory for the Royal Navy. Of the five French line-of-battle ships engaged, two were captured and three driven on shore and later destroyed. The British did not lose a single ship. When the British squadron hove in sight of the enemy they immediately weighed seeking to escape the bay. Keats, keenly aware the crew had missed Trafalgar and been denied an engagement with Willaumez, silently fixed a portrait of Nelson to the mizzen stay before addressing the men in a manner intended to lend enthusiasm for the cause. In a few minutes action commenced as the band played "God save the King" and "Nelson of the Nile". Superb, having made up all ground, took in her studding sails and firing her starboard guns was boldly laid up alongside Imperiale, the largest ship in the French Navy, some 118 guns and 1200 men. In less than an hour and a half the Alexandre and Brave of 80 guns each and the Jupiter of 74 were taken and the Imperiale (120) and Diomede (74) were destroyed. Duckworth was fortunate to have with him captains who had been part of Nelson's Mediterranean squadron, used to acting instinctively together without waiting for central direction as little was forthcoming. The battle was a graphic display of the superiority of British sea-power and put her out of all fear of another predatory war in the West Indies.

Keats received the Thanks of Parliament and a silver vase of one hundred guineas. The prizes having been fitted and sent to England, Keats returned to Cádiz in the Superb, and in the May following returned to England. Duckworth was deployed elsewhere and Keats and the Superb were ordered off Brest under the command of Lord St. Vincent. Keats was entrusted with the command of a flying squadron of five-six sail of the line employed in the Bay of Biscay and watching the port of Rochefort. They took a number of prizes including the frigate Rhin of 40 guns and 318 men, taken after a twenty-six hour chase. On learning the Rochefort squadron may be broken up and Keats redeployed St Vincent declared: "Captain Keats has such a perfect knowledge of the coast, from Biscay to Brest inclusive, that a fitter man for the service cannot be found", "under the orders of any other man than Captain Keats, who possesses so much knowledge of that sea, I should judge it improper to be continued during the winter months".

== The Baltic and the Second Battle of Copenhagen ==
In April 1807 Keats was relieved by Sir Richard Strachan and returned to Portsmouth for the purpose of being deployed on a secret mission, which did not eventuate. Keats then took command of HMS Ganges and was promoted commodore with Admiral Gambier's squadron in the Baltic, where between 16 August and 7 September, he took part in the Second Battle of Copenhagen. As a first move in the campaign a division under Keats was detached to the Great Belt, separating Funen from Zealand and Copenhagen with instructions to seal off Copenhagen from any support from the Danish army to the west. The squadron consisted of sixteen vessels. As a compliment to Keats the Admiralty sent the Superb, to which he shifted his flag, and increased the force to twenty nine. Within a week he had over two hundred miles of coast secured and 13,000 troops isolated. With these troops rendered powerless and most of the Danish army also cut off the British forces were secured from any attack from behind. The Danish army of 5,000 in Copenhagen was on its own facing a British force of twenty five thousand.

Keats was promoted rear-admiral on 2 October 1807 and moved into HMS Mars. He led the expedition with Lieutenant General Sir John Moore to the aid of the Swedish at Gothenburg. For some time thereafter he was engaged as commander in the Belt and Sound arranging his squadron to best protect British commerce from Danish gun-boats in what became known as "the gun -boat war".

== Evacuation of La Romana's division ==
A division of Spain's northern army of 12–15,000 men under the command of General La Romana (Pedro Caro y Sureda, Marquis of La Romana) was stationed in the Danish islands when in early 1808 Napoleon installed his brother as King of Spain and Spanish discontent grew to an uprising. Napoleon attempted to prevent the northern army learning of events back home and ensured the various regiments were separated and always accompanied by French or Dutch forces. There seemed no way for them to return to their homeland unless rescued by the British navy. On 23 July secret instructions were sent from the Admiralty to Keats as commander in the Belt and Sound to open negotiations with the Spanish with a view to removing the troops by sea. The mission was described as being of the greatest importance and one in which the King took a lively interest. The shipping at his disposal was quite insufficient to transport or victual an extra 10,000 men. The regiments were dispersed across various islands. He did not have resources to collect all at once, and to do so sequentially would alert the French to what was afoot.

By lengthy secret communication with La Romana it was agreed the Spanish regiments would each move by land on the port town of Nyborg under the pretext of joining together to swear allegiance to Joseph Napoleon. The British ships would similarly move to Nyborg, chosen because its harbour had sufficient water for small war ships and was known to house a large number of small boats that could be used as ferries. From there it was intended the troops be temporarily housed on nearby Langeland, thought to be both defensible and the best able to provision and water the men while waiting for transport capacity and supplies to be sent from England. Keats wrote to the Governor of Nyborg to the effect that he had no argument with the Danes, but if any opposition should be mounted he would take measures which 'it is to be apprehended might occasion the destruction of the town of Nyborg'. The Danish troops put up no resistance, but two vessels guarding the harbour, the Fama (18 guns) and Sacorman (12 guns), had to be attacked and taken to secure the harbour.

An inspection of the defences with La Romana showed the town could not be held against an advancing French army and it was determined to immediately evacuate the men. Transferring his flag to the small sloop Hound, Keats entered the harbour to supervise operations. Fifty seven local vessels were seized and rigged to transport the troops, with Keats undertaking to return the vessels when no longer required for his purposes. Each boat was manned by six crew from the British war ships. As the convoy was leaving Nyborg a further regiment arrived from another part of the coast under the protection of the gun-brig Snipe which had been detached for that purpose. A regiment of cavalry failed to join and the plans of two regiments of infantry stationed near Copenhagen were foiled by a spy and the regiments surrounded. On 13 August, the troops evacuated from Nyborg joined 2,000 more who had independently crossed to Langeland via Tassinge to the south and overpowered the local Danish regiment, so there were now more than 9,000 men temporarily camped on the island.

The majority of vessels at Keats's disposal were not capable of sailing to England, let alone Spain. Transports and victuallers were said to be on the way, but time was of the essence. The French had assembled a significant force in Jutland and were preparing to cross to Funen to launch an attack on Langeland. Gun boat activity could be heard in the night. Keats had cut a number of small escort ships from passing convoys and had taken command of the 44-gun frigate/store ship Gorgon to add to his transport capacity and determined to move the troops to a safe haven. Sweden being the only friendly nation within reach, the destination was Gothenburg, up to a week's sailing away across an open sea where they would be liable to predation. The small boats were all given numbered and lettered designations to identify their 'mother ship' eg.;S1–S22 for Superb, provided with signals, a navigator and crew. On 23 August orders were given to embark. They arrived off Gothenburg on 27 August.

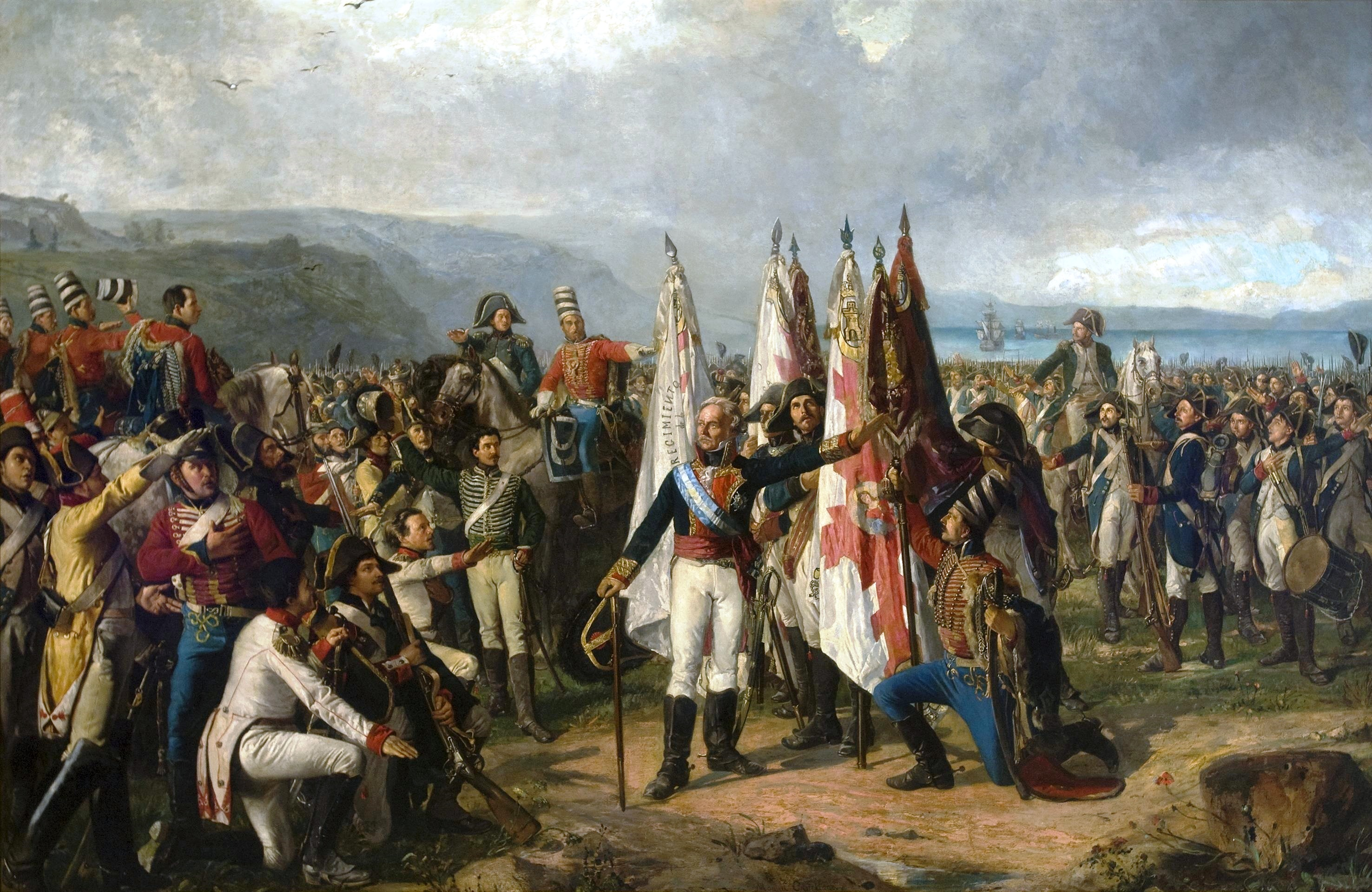
1870 painting of the evacuation of La Romana's division

A week later a convoy of thirty-five transports and supply vessels arrived and the troops were re-embarked for the journey to Spain. After a stormy three-week voyage they all arrived at or near Santander and re-joined their compatriots. The removal of the northern army from the Baltic meant Sweden was safe for a period as the troops remaining to Napoleon were insufficient to mount an invasion. Their redeployment to Spain came at a critical juncture. Whilst the French had been aware of discontent they were unprepared for such an audacious and large scale operation undertaken with such alacrity as gave them no opportunity to mount an adequate response. Keats had demonstrated the capacity of the British navy to implement foreign policy and particularly to deploy large numbers of troops where required, thousands of miles from home.

As a reward for his services he was made a Knight Companion of the Order of the Bath. At the King's request he took as his motto that of La Romana's regiment: "Mi Patria es mi Norte" – my country is my guiding star. La Romana presented Keats with a set of silver mounted pistols given to him by Napoleon saying: "I received these weapons from my greatest enemy, I now give them to my greatest and best friend." Keats remained in the Baltic on convoy duty, wintering at Marstrand, and seeking to support Sweden in preserving her neutrality until ordered home the following summer, when he escorted a merchant convoy of 200 from Karlskrona to Gothenburg where it grew to upwards of 400 strong for the voyage to England where they all arrived safely in July.

== The Walcheren Expedition ==
Only a few days later he joined Sir Richard Strachan on his expedition to the Scheldt river. Orders were to 'sink, burn, and destroy the whole of the enemy's ships of war afloat in the Scheldt, or building at Antwerp, Terneuse, or Flushing, and if possible, to render the Scheldt no longer navigable for ships of war'. The fleet conveyed an army of 39,000 men to the Island of Walcheren. Keats was ordered up the East Scheldt and took possession of the Island of South Beveland. He accepted terms of capitulation of Zierikzee and Browershaven together with the whole of the islands of Schouwen and Duiveland and ultimately took the fortress of Batz so as to command the navigation of both East and West Scheldt. Unfortunately due to the lengthy delays suffered by the army at Flushing the enemy had time to arrange reinforcements and for its shipping to retreat up river to Antwerp which was now well defended. On 17 August Keats wrote to the military commanders advising he had orders to pursue the ultimate objective, namely an advance on Antwerp, but could not proceed further without the cooperation of the army, and was told by Lieutenant General Earl of Rosslyn that he had no instructions whatsoever on the subject, but would advise.

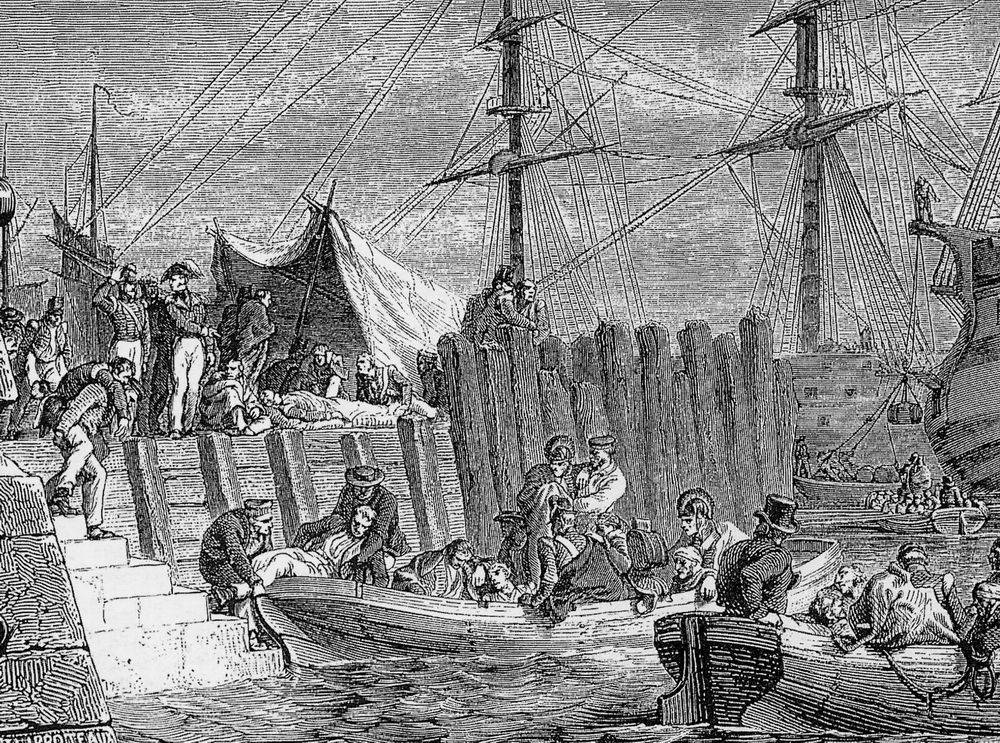
British forces evacuating Walcheren on 30 August 1809

A large portion of the army suffered from Walcheren fever and were severely unwell. Given their indisposition and the advancing number of enemy, it was concluded the ultimate objective was now unachievable. Reminiscent of the evacuation from Nyborg, Keats assisted in the withdrawal of the troops. Although Antwerp remained secure, the port of Flushing had been rendered useless, and three ships on the stocks destroyed while others were brought away and taken into the navy. It emerged in a Parliamentary enquiry that Keats had observed to Lord Castlereagh before departing Deal, that in view of the weather, if Antwerp was the primary objective he hoped they should not find themselves involved in a siege of Flushing or in Walcheren, but should proceed to the ultimate objective without delay. The Minister heard what he had to say, but did not question him about it. Keats told the enquiring it was an expression of his opinion only; it was not advice, as his advice had not been sought.

On Superb's return to Portsmouth in 1809 she was paid off. Keats was granted much needed leave and promoted to rear-admiral of the white squadron. On 26 December 1809 he was given the post of His Majesty's Commissioner for the Civil Affairs of Malta, but resigned before taking office. In 1810 after a nearly twenty-one year's continuous service he took leave ashore. In May 1810 he was granted the Freedom of his home town of Bideford, Devon.

== Siege of Cádiz and the Mediterranean ==
His health only slightly improved, he was called to sea in July 1810. Keats hoisted his flag onboard Implacable commanded by Captain George Cockburn to take command of the British forces including eight sail of the line and numerous gun-boats off Cádiz, which was at that time blockaded by a French army and threatened with a siege. Keats saw the need for further gun boats with more powerful armaments and the Admiralty immediately allowed him to take 30 men from each passing ship of the line, sent shipwrights to construct small gun-boats, and dispatched a number of small frigates and cruisers to supplement the squadron. Spanish ships not well placed to take part in the defence of Cádiz were removed from the over-crowded harbour lest they fall into French hands. Keats directed numerous raids on the French coastal installations, personally leading a number of attacks in his gig.

In March 1811 a significant force under the command of General Graham was landed behind French lines at Algeciras. They marched thirty miles back to Tarifa, while the ships boats transported the artillery along shore. There they were joined by Spanish forces. The ensuing battle resulted in the British victory at the Battle of Barrosa. On 1 August 1811 Keats was promoted vice-admiral and joined Sir Edward Pellew off Toulon. For the second time in his career the promotion was extended down to him, indicating Keats was the particular officer the Admiralty sought to recognise. Keats's health remained compromised. He was given the option to continue in his independent command at Cádiz or to join the Mediterranean fleet as second in command to his long-time friend Sir Edward Pellew, and chose the latter. Pellew's biographer, C.N Parkinson wrote: "If ever Pellew found a kindred spirit it was in the warm-hearted warrior soul of Keats; and if ever he yielded to another in seamanship, it was the same man. They made an odd pair; Pellew – big, gregarious; Keats – short, urbane, but they were as one in purpose. 'With such a man you have everything to expect and nothing to fear,' Pellew wrote."

== Governor of Newfoundland ==
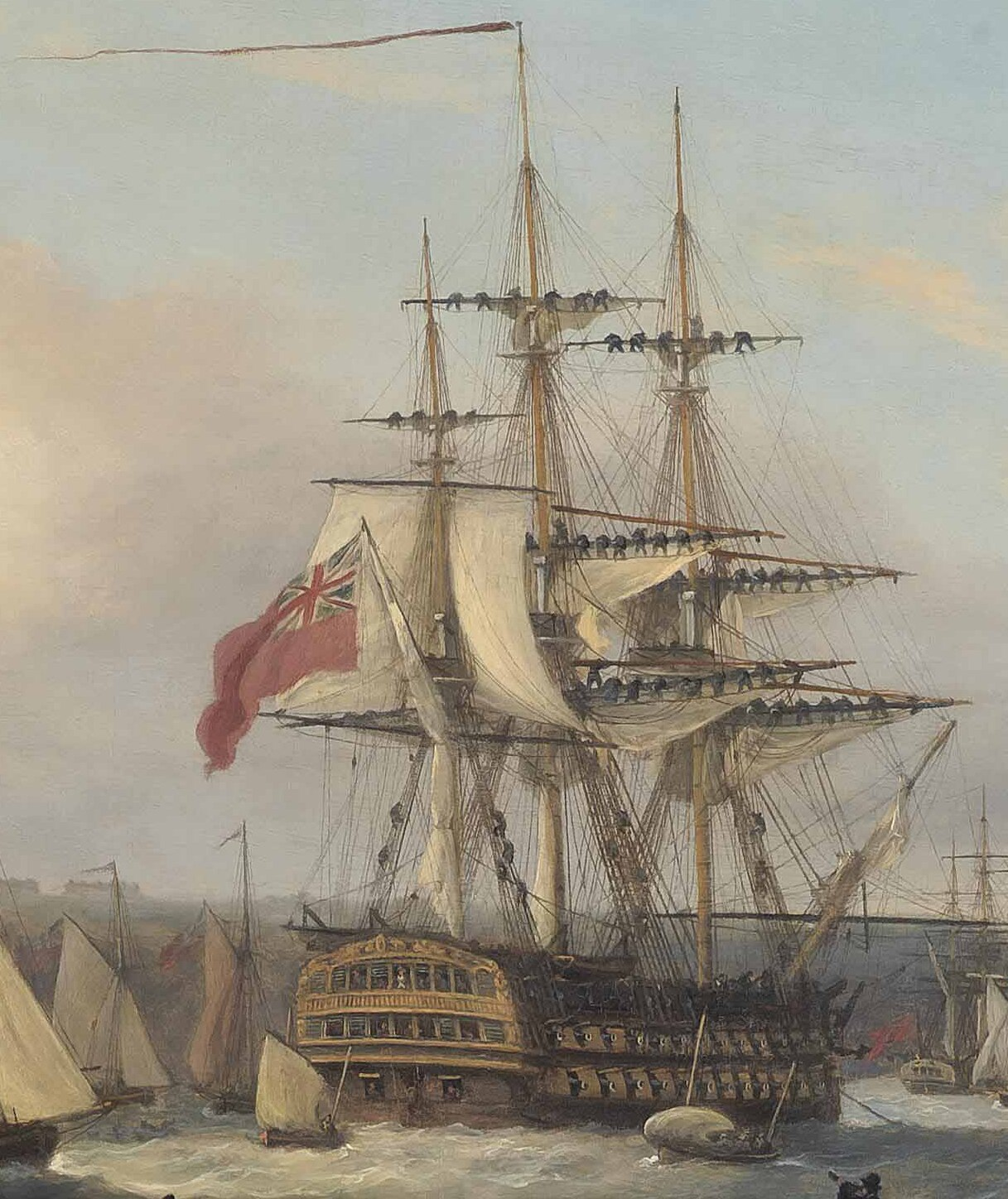
HMS Bellerophon, which brough Keats to Newfoundland

Keats was forced to haul down his flag in 1812 due to ill health and retired to Devon. Time, relaxation and his native air having improved his health, on 9 March 1813 he was made governor of Newfoundland on the understanding more active employment would be found should his health be fully restored.

He journeyed to Newfoundland on the newly re-fitted 74-gun HMS Bellerophon with a convoy of eighty-four merchant ships. During his term as governor the British government agreed for the first time to let Newfoundland settlers lease land for cultivation. Keats granted 110 leases around St. John's in the first year alone. The post became more active during the unrest of the war of 1812 and ships of war were continually anchoring and sailing scouring the coast in protection of trade and the fishery in particular. In 1816 he returned to England and was succeeded as Governor of Newfoundland by Francis Pickmore.

On 7 May 1818 Keats was awarded the additional rank of Major-General of His Majesty's Royal Marine Forces – an honorary position described as reserved for those officers foremost in the catalogue of those who have rendered brilliant and glorious public service, and who had most perilously served their country under the hottest fire. On 12 August 1819 Keats was promoted to Admiral of the Blue. Following a restructure in 1818 Keats was appointed one of the Commissioners of the Board of Longitude.

== Governor of Greenwich Hospital, death and funeral ==
In 1821 he was further honoured by his appointment as governor of Greenwich Hospital, a role he filled with distinction until his death thirteen years later. After forty years at sea he embraced a variety of interests on shore. He maintained his estates of 3,000 acres at Port Hill and Durrant House near Bideford in Devon. For some time he was a director of the Royal Sailing Society and honorary member of the Coronation Sailing Society. On formation of the Royal Thames Yacht Club King William became Patron and Keats Vice-patron – a position passed to his successor as Governor of the hospital – Rear-Admiral Hardy in due course.

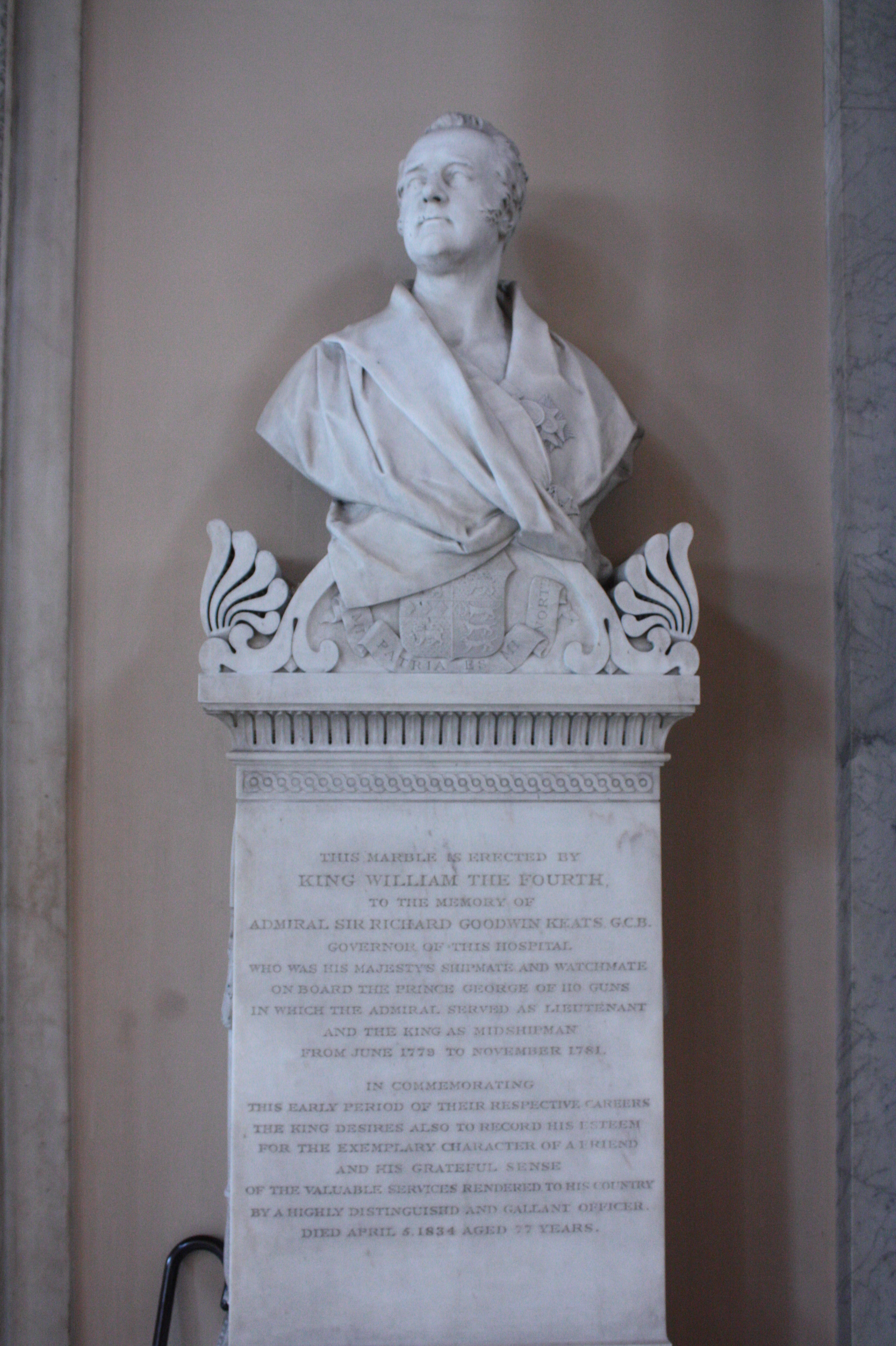
Memorial to Keats at the Greenwich Hospital's chapel

During his governorship at Greenwich he found alcohol abuse among the pensioners to be a significant issue. He promoted temperance within the Hospital and also became a founding Vice President of the British and Overseas Temperance Society. He did not himself abstain, describing total abstinence (particularly on the part of sailors going into battle) as perfect humbug. Keats was tasked by King William with investigating the supposed inventions of one Samuel Alfred Warner who claimed to have conceived devices that would forever change naval warfare. Rear Admiral Hardy was called in to assist. Many years after both had died Warner proffered a report claimed to be in Keats's handwriting supporting the efficacy of the inventions, but no other record has been found of draft or final reports or correspondence in support and Warner's claims are considered to be unsubstantiated and false. The inventions were never fully disclosed and effectively died with Warner.

On 22 July 1830 he was promoted to Admiral of the White. Keats died in Greenwich on 5 April 1834 and his funeral was held at the hospital chapel the following weekend with the Admiralty Board, the naval officers of the King's Household, a battalion of Royal Marines and Naval bands in attendance. His coffin was borne by six admirals as pall-bearers. From early in the morning the town of Greenwich was 'much thronged' with people anxious to view the imposing ceremony. Field guns were fired from the top of the Observatory Hill on the minute as the procession made its way through the hospital courtyards to the Chapel. William IV ordered a bust of his friend to be erected in the chapel and it remains there, under the organ loft on the left hand side of the main entrance. The right hand side is occupied by a bust of Sir Thomas Hardy.

== Family ==
In 1820 Keats married Mary, eldest daughter of the late Francis Hurt of Alderwasley in Derbyshire. There were no children from the marriage.

He was described by United Services Magazine as "a sincere Christian in his belief and practice, and both were characterised by an enlarged benevolence. He was a personable, smart, and strict officer; but at the same time, a kind, intelligent, moral and generous man, with a shrewd and penetrating discrimination."

== Notes ==
a. The battle is described in the novel Master and Commander by Patrick O'Brian, from the viewpoint of Jack Aubrey. The battle is also described in the novel Touch and Go, by C. Northcote Parkinson

== See also ==
- Governors of Newfoundland
- List of people of Newfoundland and Labrador

Political offices
Preceded by Sir John Thomas Duckworth	Commodore Governor of Newfoundland; 1813–1816	Succeeded by Francis Pickmore
Military offices
Preceded by Sir John Colpoys	Governor, Greenwich Hospital; 1821–1834	Succeeded by Sir Thomas Hardy
