= George Elphinstone, 1st Viscount Keith =

Royal Navy officer and politician (1746–1823)

Admiral of the Red The Right Honourable The Viscount Keith GCB FRS
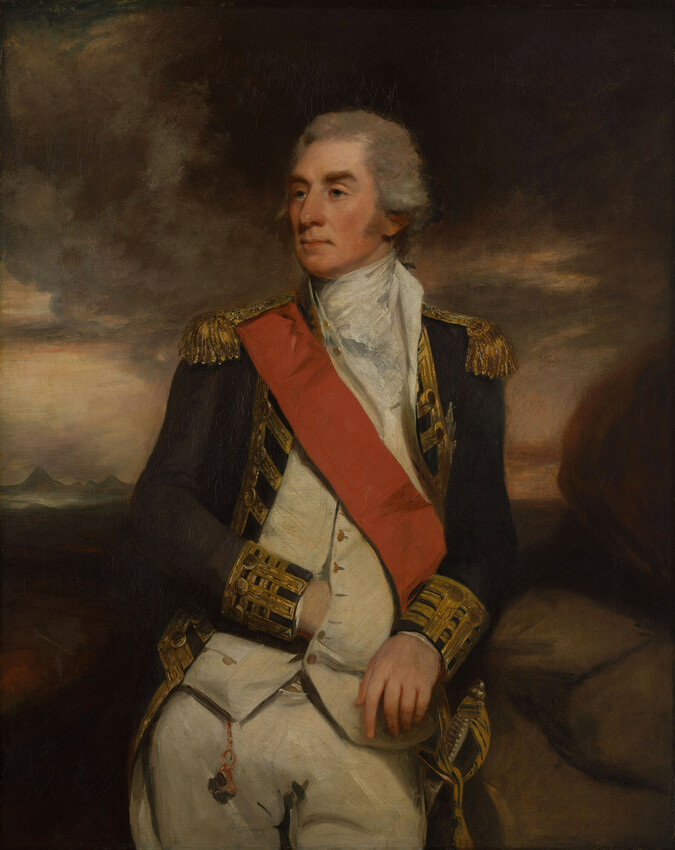
- Portrait by John Hoppner, c. 1799–1801
- Born: 7 January 1746; Elphinstone Tower, Scotland
- Died: 10 March 1823 (aged 77); Tulliallan Castle, Kincardine, Fife
- Military career
- Allegiance: Great Britain; United Kingdom
- Branch: Royal Navy
- Service years: 1761–1823
- Rank: Admiral of the Red
- Commands: HMS Scorpion; HMS Romney; HMS Perseus; HMS Warwick; HMS Carysfort; HMS Robust
- Conflicts: Seven Years' War; American War of Independence; Siege of Charleston; Action of 15 September 1782; Fourth Anglo-Dutch War; French Revolutionary Wars; Siege of Toulon (1793); Invasion of the Cape Colony; Capitulation of Saldanha Bay; Croisière de Bruix; Siege of Genoa (1800); French invasion of Egypt and Syria; Napoleonic Wars; Battle of Blanc-Nez and Gris-Nez
- Awards: Knight of the Order of the Crescent; Knight of the Order of Saints Maurice and Lazarus

Admiral of the Red George Keith Elphinstone, 1st Viscount Keith, GCB, FRS (7 January 1746 – 10 March 1823) was a Royal Navy officer and politician who served in the French Revolutionary and Napoleonic Wars.

== Early life ==
George Keith Elphinstone was born on 7 January 1746 at Elphinstone Tower in Scotland. He was the fifth son of Charles Elphinstone, 10th Lord Elphinstone and his wife Lady Clementina Fleming, the daughter and heiress of John Fleming, 6th Earl of Wigtown. Of Elphinstone's elder brothers, three joined the British military while the fourth, William, joined the East India Company as a sea captain. Elphinstone studied at a grammar school in Glasgow before joining the Royal Navy on 4 November 1761 as a midshipman onboard HMS Royal Sovereign. He transferred to HMS Gosport on 1 January 1762.

Serving in Gosport on the North American Station during the Seven Years' War's final years, Elphinstone served in the campaign to drive out French forces from the Newfoundland Colony which culminated in the Battle of Signal Hill on 15 September. At the end of the year Gosport sailed back to Britain, and in March 1763 Elphinstone left her to join HMS Juno. He stayed in Juno only briefly, transferring from her to HMS Lively after two months. As part of the Mediterranean Fleet, Elphinstone served in Lively until January 1765, at which point he went on leave at home. His leave over, Elphinstone was next appointed to serve on HMS Emerald in August 1766.

In December Elphinstone obtained permission to leave Emerald and join William onboard the East Indiaman Tryton as third mate on a voyage to China. The two brothers' uncle, Lord Marischal, lent each man £2,000 for the journey, which took place over the course of 1767. In December 1769 Elphinstone joined HMS Stag and was promoted to lieutenant on 28 June 1770. He returned to England four months later and began serving on HMS Trident, which went to the Mediterranean. Once Trident returned home Elphinstone was promoted to master and commander and given command of HMS Scorpion on 18 September 1772. He returned with her to the Mediterranean and stayed there until ordered back in April 1774, making a brief cruise to Scotland.

== American War of Independence ==
On 11 March 1775, just before the American War of Independence broke out, Elphinstone was promoted to post-captain and made captain of HMS Romney. He set sail from England in June to serve in the Newfoundland Station and returned with Romney in mid-November with a merchant convoy. On 8 March 1776 he transferred to HMS Perseus and went to North America in July, capturing the American privateer Viper on 27 September before joining a squadron which went to Antigua to refit over the winter. Perseus captured the American privateer Defence on 2 April 1777 and another one, Sachem, three days later; Elphinstone captured another American privateer, America, on 11 October 1779 and the French privateer Thérèse on 22 November. During the siege of Charleston Elphinstone commanded a 450-strong naval brigade on 11 May 1780; he returned to England in late May and Perseus was paid off in June.

On 22 July 1780 Elphinstone was made captain of HMS Warwick and captured the Dutch ship of the line Rotterdam on 5 January 1781. In the same year he was elected to the House of Commons for Dunbartonshire. On 27 March Elphinstone began escorting a merchant convoy from Cork, Ireland to North America and Warwick remained on the North American Station, and he served as a governor to Prince William Henry in New York City. Elphinstone captured the American privateer Elizabeth on 18 May and another, Greyhound, on 11 August. In the action of 15 September 1782 a squadron he commanded captured the 36-gun French frigate Aigle in the Delaware Bay. Elphinstone returned to New York and due to his poor health transferred his captaincy to HMS Carysfort on 29 October and returned in November. Elphinstone stopped being captain of Carysfort on 3 January 1783 and served as HMS Robust's captain from 29 January until 30 August. Following the war's end on 3 September 1783 he remained ashore on half-pay for almost a decade, sitting in Parliament until 1790; was elected a fellow of the Royal Society in the same year.

== French Revolutionary Wars ==
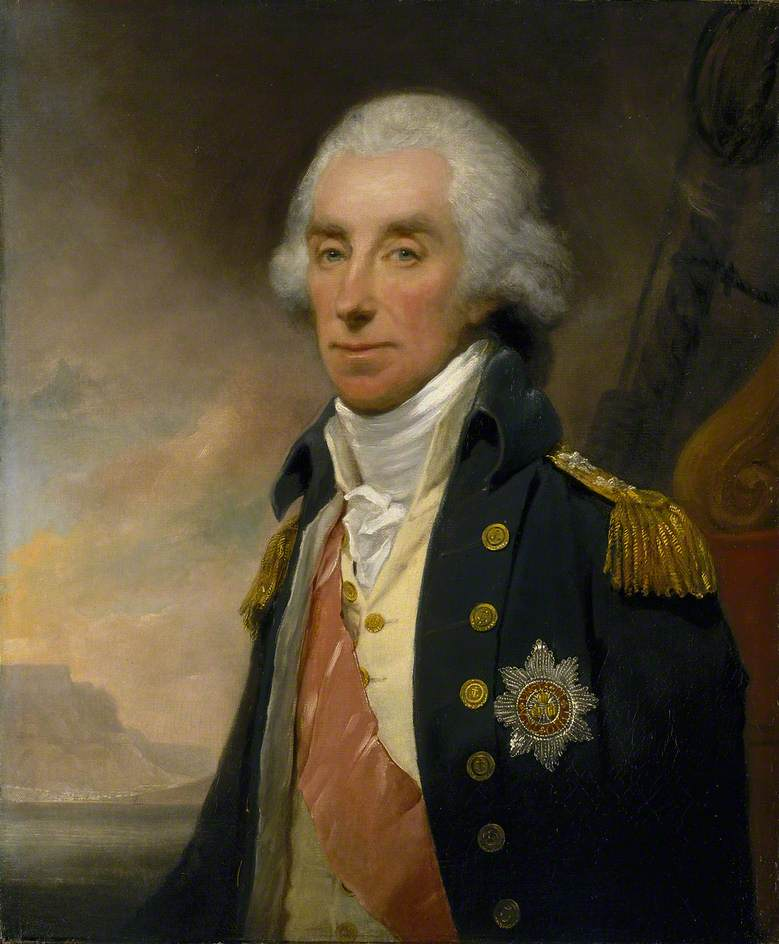
1799 portrait of Keith by William Owen

Following Revolutionary France's declaration of war against Britain on 1 February 1793, Elphinstone was again appointed as Robust's captain, taking part in the occupation of Toulon under Vice-Admiral of the Red Samuel Hood, 1st Viscount Hood in August 1793. When the French Revolutionary Army laid siege to the city, Elphinstone distinguished himself by leading an Anglo-Spanish naval brigade to victory over a French force. When Toulon was evacuated in December, he embarked a number of French Royalist civilians as refugees. Elphinstone was promoted to Rear-Admiral of the Blue on 12 April 1794, hoisting his flag on the 98-gun ship of the line HMS Glory, and 30 May he was invested as a Knight Companion of the Order of the Bath by George III as a reward for his actions in Toulon.

Elphinstone missed the Glorious First of June as he was not aboard Glory and was promoted to Rear-Admiral of the White on 5 July. He transferred his flag to the 98-gun ship of the line HMS Barfleur in August before transferring again to the 74-gun ship of the line HMS Monarch on 14 March 1795 On 3 April 1795 Elphinstone set sail from England at the head of an invasion force with orders to occupy the Dutch Cape Colony; he arrived in June (and was promoted to Vice-Admiral of the Blue on 1 June) and the colony surrendered in September. Elphinstone proceeded to establish the Cape of Good Hope Station, serving as its first commander-in-chief until 1796. He also received a large share of the prize money gained from the colony's capture and went to India, but began suffering health problems there. Elphinstone then decided to return to England and during the voyage home he forced the bloodless surrender of a Batavian Navy squadron sent to retake the Cape Colony at the capitulation of Saldanha Bay on 17 August 1796. In the same year, Elphinston was again elected to the House of Commons for Stirlingshire.

Following Elphinstone's return to England the Nore mutiny broke out in 1797 and he was appointed to command the British naval forces in the area and soon restored order. Elphinstone was subsequently set to Plymouth and restored order in the squadron stationed there as well; for these actions he was made Baron Keith in the Irish peerage in the same year. In late 1798 he was sent as second-in-command to the Commander-in-Chief, Mediterranean Fleet, Admiral of the White Lord St Vincent. Keith's new role was marked by difficulties due to St Vincent's poor health and arbitrary decision making, while Rear-Admiral of the Red Sir Horatio Nelson, also stationed in the Mediterranean, viewed Keith's appointment as a personal slight and was repeatedly insubordinate. On 14 February 1799 Keith was promoted to Vice-Admiral of the Red and in May he proved unable to counter a French expedition under Vice-admiral Étienne Eustache Bruix, mostly due to disputes with other British naval officers. Keith followed Bruix' expedition to Brest on its retreat, but was unable to bring the French to battle.

Elphinstone returned to the Mediterranean in November 1799 as the Mediterranean Fleet's new commander-in-chief. He co-operated with the Austrian army during the siege of Genoa, which surrendered on 4 June 1800. However, the French victory at Marengo on 14 June led to France retaking the city and Keith was forced to rapidly withdraw his ships from Genoa's harbour. On 1 January 1801 he was promoted to Admiral of the Blue and over the next few months Keith oversaw the transportation of a British army to French-occupied Egypt; he continued to participate in the army's successful campaign to liberate the region from France, which lasted until September. As the few warships the French had in Egypt remained in port Keith had no opportunities to engage in naval actions but he distinguished himself in transporting British troops, including at the Battle of Abukir on 8 March.

== Napoleonic Wars and death ==
Keith was made Baron Keith in the British peerage in 1801, and the French Revolutionary Wars were ended in April 1802 by the Peace of Amiens. However, after the renewal of war with France in May 1803 Keith was appointed Commander-in-Chief, North Sea, holding the post until 1807. On 18 July 1805 he unsuccessfully attacked a Franco-Batavian naval force at the Battle of Blanc-Nez and Gris-Nez and on 9 November Keith was promoted to Admiral of the White. He was promoted again to Admiral of the Red on 31 July 1810 and in February 1812 Keith was appointed commander-in-chief of the Channel Fleet before being raised to a viscountcy in 1814. From 1803 to 1805 Keith was engaged in overseeing British anti-invasion preparations in response to Napoleon's planned invasion of the United Kingdom and after the invasion was called off he oversaw the movements of the numerous British squadrons and privateers active off the Iberian Peninsula as part of the Peninsular War along with taking steps to protect British-flagged merchant shipping.

Keith was at Plymouth when Napoleon surrendered to HMS Bellerophon on 15 July 1815 and was brought to the English coastline. On 31 July Keith went aboard Bellerophon and informed Napoleon that the British government had decided he was to be exiled to the colony of Saint Helena. Keith refused to be led into disputes, and confined himself to declaring steadily that he had his orders to obey. He was not much impressed by the appearance of his illustrious charge and thought that the airs of Napoleon and his suite were ridiculous. Keith died on 1823 at Tulliallan Castle, near Kincardine-on-Forth, Fife, his property in Scotland, and was buried in the parish church.

== Personal life and legacy ==
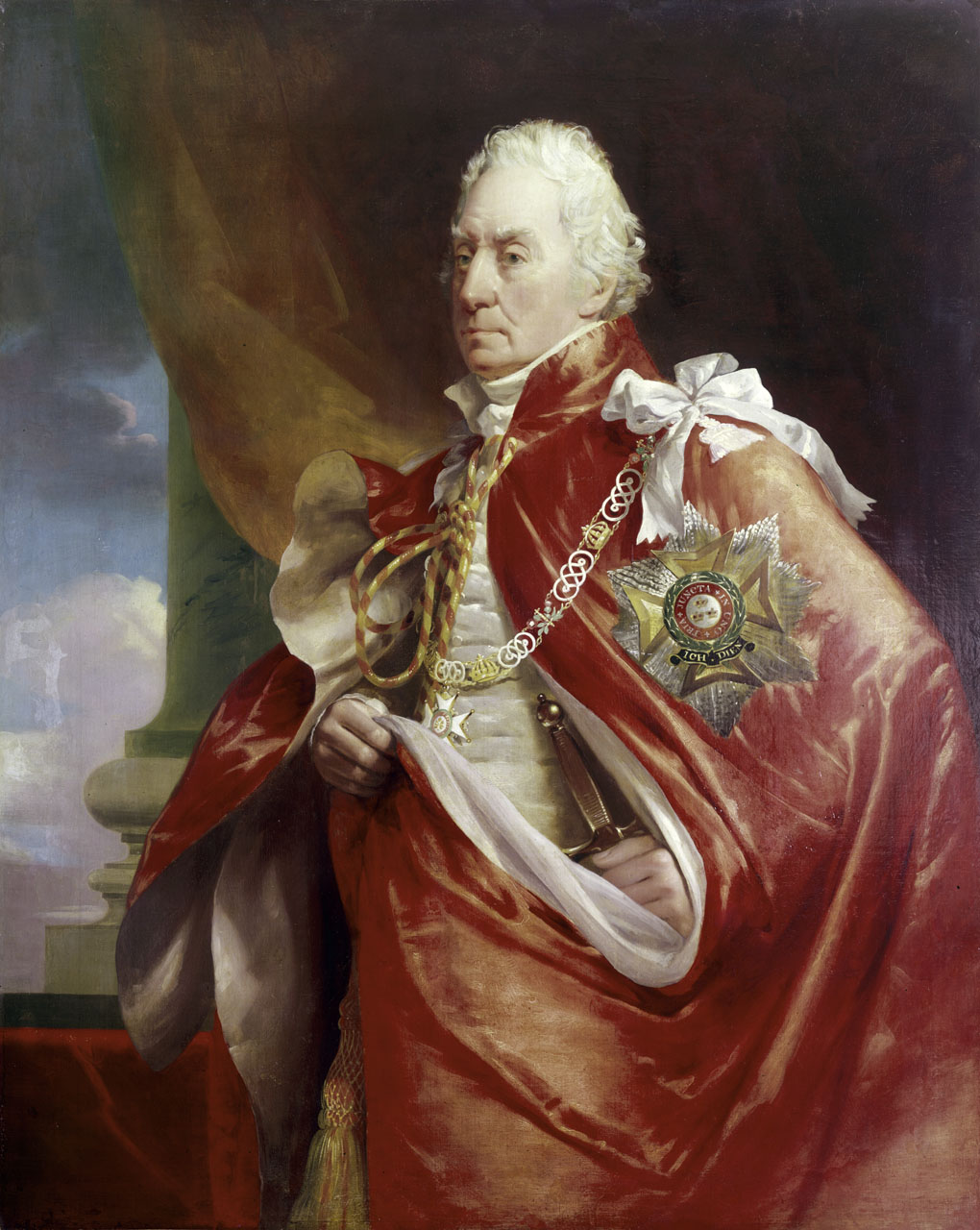
1815–1823 portrait of Keith by George Sanders

He was twice married: in 1787 to Jane Mercer, daughter of Colonel William Mercer of Aldie, and in 1808 to Hester Maria Thrale, daughter of Henry Thrale and Hester Thrale, who is spoken of as 'Queeney' in Boswell's Life of Johnson and in Madame d'Arblay's Diary. He had a daughter by each marriage, the second being Georgina Augusta Henrietta, but no son. Thus the viscountcy became extinct on his death, but the British and Irish baronies descended to his elder daughter Margaret (1788–1867), who married the Comte de Flahault, only to become extinct on her death.

A portrait of him by Owen is in the Painted Hall in Greenwich and another by George Sanders in the National Maritime Museum, Greenwich. He was initiated into Scottish Freemasonry in Lodge Holyrood House (St Luke's), No. 44, on 16 June 1769. Keith and his wife 'Queeney' appear in several of the novels in Patrick O'Brian's Aubrey–Maturin series. He is also mentioned in passing in Robert Brightwell's novel Flashman and the Seawolf, based loosely on the exploits of Thomas Cochrane, 10th Earl of Dundonald (as is, in part, the character of Jack Aubrey).

== Arms ==
Coat of arms of George Elphinstone, 1st Viscount Keith
Crest A Lady from the middle well attired proper holding in her dexter hand a Tower Argent and in her sinister a Laurel Branch proper Escutcheon Argent a Chevron Sable between three Boars' Heads erased Gules Supporters Dexter: A Savage proper wreathed head and middle with Oak Leaves Vert in his exterior hand a Club resting on his right shoulder on his breast a Shield Azure charged with three Fleur de lis Or, at his feet an Anchor Sable; Sinister: A Stag proper attired and unguled Or collared Azure the Collar charged with three Cinquefoils Argent and pendent therefrom a Shield of the last with a Chief Gules charged with three Pallets Or, the dexter hind foot resting on an Anchor Sable Motto Cause Causit

== Citations ==
Military offices
New post	Commander-in-Chief, Cape of Good Hope Station; 1795–1796	Succeeded by Thomas Pringle
Preceded by Earl of St Vincent	Commander-in-Chief, Mediterranean Fleet; 1799–1802	Succeeded by Viscount Nelson
Preceded by Archibald Dickson	Commander-in-Chief, North Sea; 1803–1807	Succeeded by Thomas Macnamara Russell
Preceded by Alexander Graeme	Commander-in-Chief, The Nore (Part of North Sea Command); 1803–1807	Succeeded by Thomas Wells
Parliament of Great Britain
Preceded by Lord Frederick Campbell	Member of Parliament for Dunbartonshire; 1781–1790	Succeeded by Sir Archibald Edmonstone
Preceded by Robert Graham of Gartmore	Member of Parliament for Stirlingshire; 1796–1801	Succeeded by Parliament of the United Kingdom
Parliament of the United Kingdom
Preceded by Parliament of Great Britain	Member of Parliament for Stirlingshire; 1801–1802	Succeeded by Charles Elphinstone Fleeming
Peerage of the United Kingdom
New creation	Viscount Keith; 1814–1823	Extinct
New creation	Baron Keith; 1801–1823	Extinct
New creation	Baron Keith; 1803–1823	Succeeded by Margaret Keith
Peerage of Ireland
New creation	Baron Keith; 1797–1823	Succeeded by Margaret Keith
