= Action of 15 September 1782 =

- Part of the American Revolutionary War
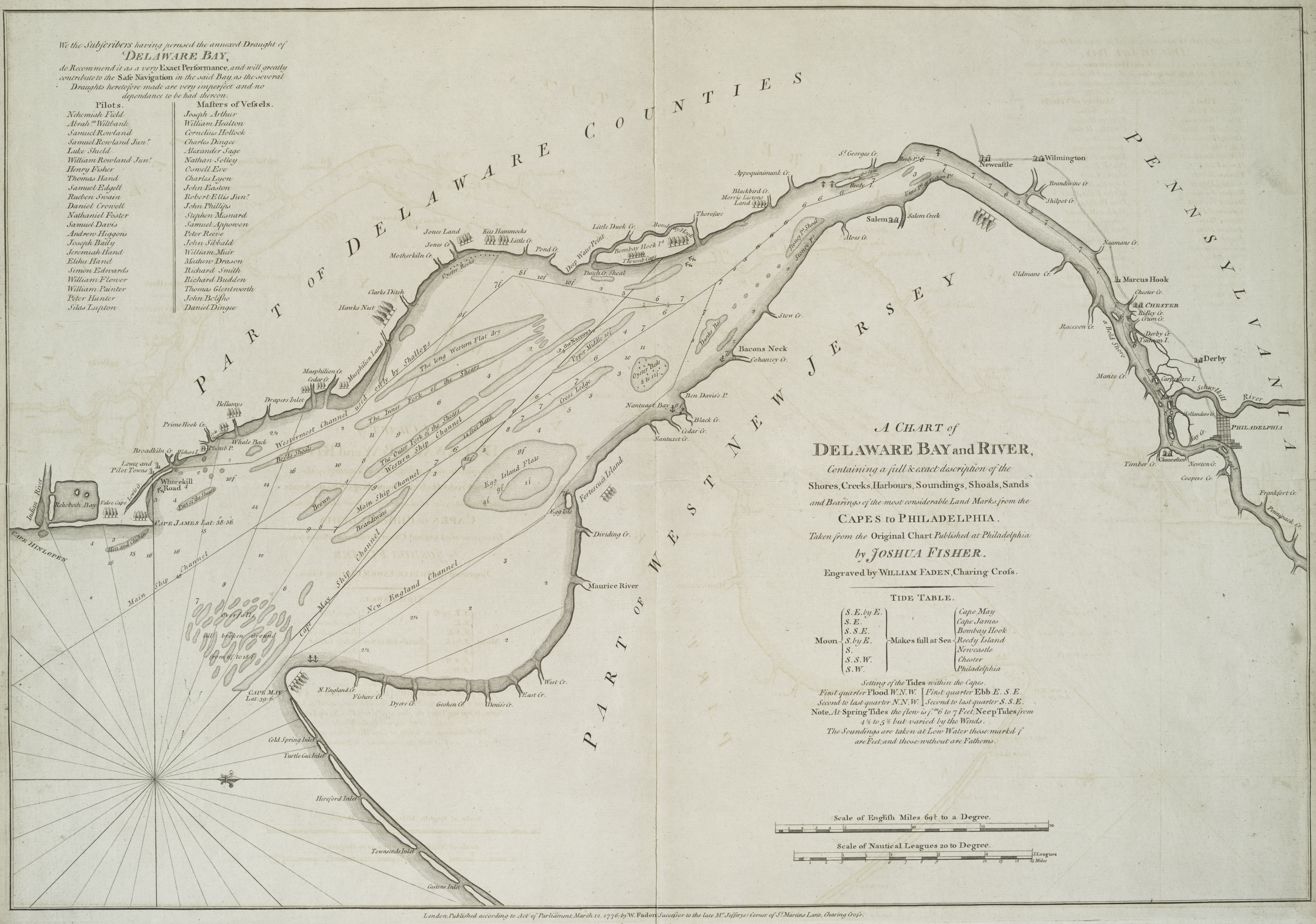
- 1776 map of the Delaware Bay
Date	15 September 1782
Location	Delaware Bay
Result	British victory

Belligerents
Great Britain	France

Commanders and leaders
George Elphinstone	Latouche Tréville (surrendered)

Strength
2 ships of the line 1 frigate 1 sloop-of-war	2 frigates

Casualties and losses
Unknown	600 captured 1 frigate captured

The action of 15 September 1782 (also known as the Second Battle of Delaware Bay) was a naval action in the mouth of the Delaware Bay in which four Royal Navy vessels under George Elphinstone pursued and attacked three French warships that included two frigates under Louis-René Levassor de Latouche Tréville. The French 38-gun frigate Aigle was grounded and captured along with Tréville.

== Background ==
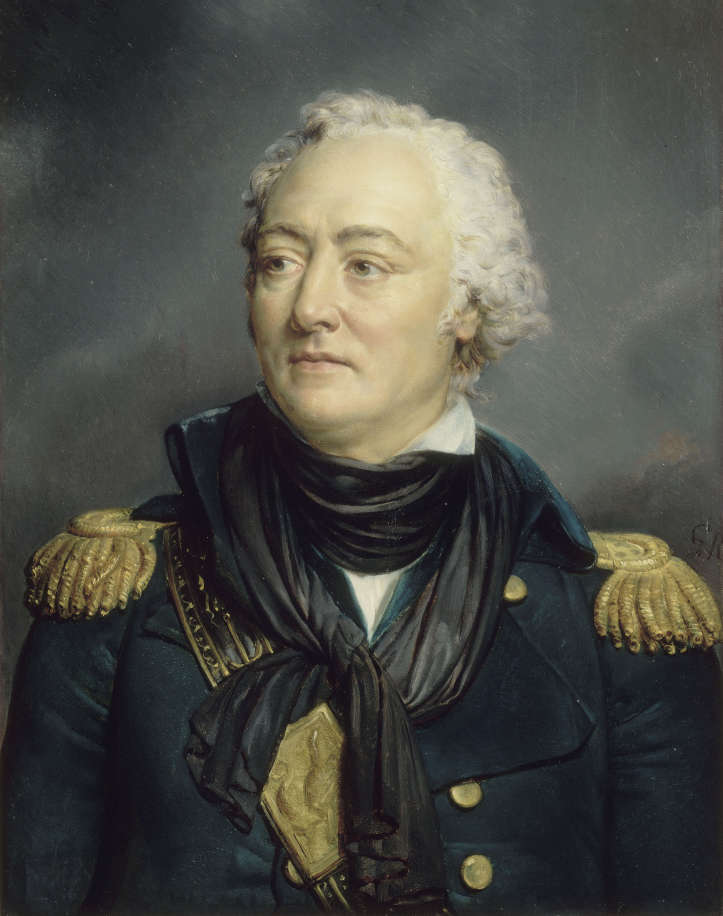
1840 portrait of Latouche Tréville by Georges Rouget

In early 1782, Captain Louis-René Levassor de Latouche Tréville assumed command of Aigle, which, along with the frigate Gloire, ferried funds and equipment for the fleet of Admiral Louis-Philippe de Vaudreuil. On 5 September 1782 Aigle and Gloire encountered the recently acquired British ship Hector, a former French ship of the line that had been severely damaged and then captured during the Battle of the Saintes. Hector managed to escape, but she was damaged further and later sank in the 1782 Central Atlantic hurricane.

Aigle and Gloire chased the 16-gun British sloop HMS Bonetta under Lieutenant Richard Goodwin Keats through the night of 11 September 1782, but she evaded her pursuers. The next morning the French were seen by the 14-gun brig HMS Racoon under Lieutenant Nagle, which had departed company from the squadron off the Delaware River and who failed to identify them as French ships until too late. After receiving raking fire he was forced to surrender. Keats re-joined the squadron and reported his encounter the previous night.

Tréville hoisted signals requesting a pilot, but none was forthcoming. At 2100, the division dropped anchor and Gloire sent a boat to Lewistown to request a pilot, but the boat did not return.

On 13 September the small British squadron consisting of HMS Vestal, HMS Bonetta, and the prize Sophie, (Note: the same ship that carried Tréville's mistress.) led by Captain George Elphinstone in HMS Warwick, and HMS Lion sighted the three vessels anchored in the Delaware River off Cape Henlopen Light. The British set out in chase; Captain Elphinstone, in the 50-gun ship Warwick, dispatched the lighter vessels 28-gun frigate Vestal, the sloop Bonetta and the Sophie under command of Richard Keats as they were to traverse shallow waters.

== Action ==
Chased by the British division, Tréville attempted to escape into shallow waters without a pilot, but then discovered that Racoon had a pilot, offering him 500 Louis d'or to lead the frigates. However, when she entered the safe channel, Aigle found her interdicted by the British, and diverted into a secondary channel, which she found to be barred by a sandbank. The British dropped anchor, waiting for the high tide. Meanwhile, Gloire's boat finally returned with a pilot, who informed Tréville that his situation was hopeless. Tréville then started evacuating his guests and funds from the frigate all through the afternoon and night. (Note: The French officers who escaped included "Baron Viomini" [sic] (commander of the French army), Mons. La Va de Montmerancy, Duke Laurun, Viscount de Fleury, and some others. They took most of the treasure she was carrying, as well.) Two British boats attempted to cut away Gloire's cutter, and Aigle's longboat had to intervene with musket fire.

Around 1000 on the 14th, the British sent a cartel to offer an exchange of prisoners. Tréville agreed and released Racoon's captain, Lieutenant Nagle. Soon after, British boats started advancing, and Tréville attempted to retreat deeper into the channel to hopefully lighten his frigates enough so she could sail over the sandbank. Both Gloire and Aigle ran aground, but Gloire managed to cross, while Aigle settled. Racoon crossed the sandbank with no difficulty.

Gloire succeeded in getting so far up the river that she could not be attacked with any prospect of success, while the British ships had to traverse the shallows without a pilot on board. Keats took upon himself responsibility for navigating the shallows of the Delaware and continued the chase for two whole days as they eased over banks. Aigle, which now had most of Racoon's crew grounded, allowing the Vestal and Bonetta, drawing less water to gain positions to attack the French frigate. The Vestal ran aground on the starboard quarter of the Aigle, the Bonetta anchoring within 200 yards of her larboard quarter, while the Sophie anchored under her stern.

Tréville had some of Aigle's guns thrown overboard and had cut away her masts in an attempt to refloat her, but to no avail. With the descending tide, Aigle settled on the side, rendering her remaining artillery useless. Tréville then started evacuating the frigate and had holes bored in her hull, after which he remained with her and struck her colours on 15 September. (Note: Tréville was freed when the peace was signed in 1783.) Despite the attempts to scuttle Aigle, the British were able to refloat her and took her into service under her own name. Gloire and Racoon escaped.

== Aftermath ==
Along with the Aigle, the British captured all of Racoon's crew. Aigle had had on board some senior French officers, who escaped ashore, as did the now-wealthy pilot. The French officers who escaped included Comte de Rochambeau (commander of the French army), Vicomte de Laval, Duke Laurun, Viscount de Fleury, and some others. In addition, they took most of the treasure the ships were carrying.

The British were able to refloat Aigle and took her into service as HMS Aigle. Tréville, along with several noblemen that included two of Marquis de Lafayette's family, as well 600 sailors and troops, were captured by the crew of the Royal Naval vessels, helped by a number of British troops who had arrived very late in the action. Tréville remained a prisoner for the rest of the war's duration. Captain Elphinstone allowed Tréville and his mistress to reunite. The Sophie was taken into the navy, but sold two years later.
