= HMS Warwick (1767) =

1767 ship of the Royal Navy

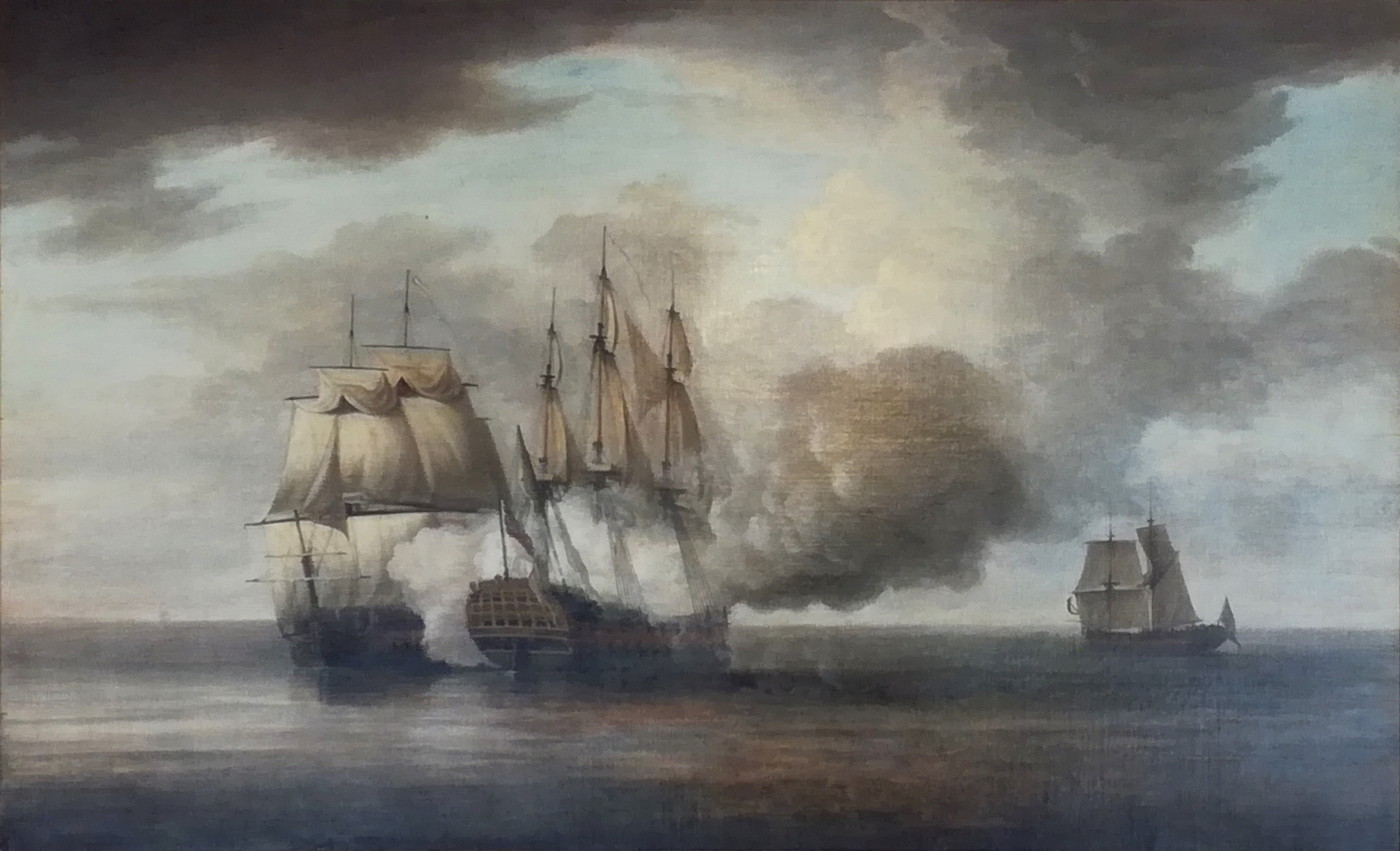
- Warwick (centre) in action against the 50-gun Dutch ship Rotterdam, on 5 January 1781

History

Great Britain
- Name: HMS Warwick
- Ordered: 13 December 1758
- Builder: Thomas Bucknall
- Cost: £20,493.8.10d plus £8,620.1.6d for fitting
- Laid down: 27 August 1762
- Launched: 28 February 1762
- Completed: March 1771
- Fate: Sold 24 March 1802

General characteristics
- Class & type: Fourth-rate
- Tons burthen: 1,073 71/94 (bm)
- Length: 151 feet 0 inches (46.0 m) (gundeck); 124 feet 7 1/4 inches (38.0 m) (keel)
- Beam: 40 feet 3 inches (12.3 m)
- Depth of hold: 18 feet 3 inches (6 m)
- Propulsion: Sails
- Sail plan: Fully-rigged ship
- Complement: 350
- Armament: Lower deck: 22 × 24-pounder guns; Upper deck: 22 × 12-pounder guns; Quarterdeck: 4 × 6-pounder guns; Forecastle: 2 × 6-pounder guns

HMS Warwick was a fifty-gun, two-deck, sailing warship of the Royal Navy and was one of the largest of her type. She was first commissioned during the Falkland Crisis of 1770 but the conflict was resolved before she could sail. In 1780, Warwick left for North America under George Elphinstone, to serve in the American Revolutionary War. While in the Channel, she captured Rotterdam on 5 January 1781, a Dutch two-decker of 50 guns, before returning to America and taking two privateer brigs in May and a schooner in August.

Following the capture of Charleston, she transported troops to the town, arriving on 13 June. She continued to harass enemy shipping in American waters and in September 1782, was part of a squadron that chased the French frigates, Aigle and Gloire, of 28 and 32 guns respectively, into the dangerous shallows of the Delaware River. Gloire escaped but Aigle ran aground and was captured.

At the start of 1783, Warwick returned home and paid off. She was fitted out as a receiving ship at Chatham and served in that role until she was sold in March 1802.

== Construction ==
Warwick was a fourth-rate ship of the Royal Navy, a class of ship that carried between 40 and 60 guns, and which, prior to the Seven Years' War, stood in the line-of-battle. Despite having increased in size since the Admiralty established its 1745 dimensions, 50-gun ships like Warwick were, by the middle of the 1750s, considered too light to be a part of the battle fleet. Relegated to the cruiser class, they were found to be too slow for frigate duties but continued to be ordered and built for convoy escort. With the lower guns removed, they could be quickly converted for use as transports or troopships and, on smaller stations, were often chosen as flagships because they were roomier than a frigate but considerably cheaper than a ship-of-the-line.

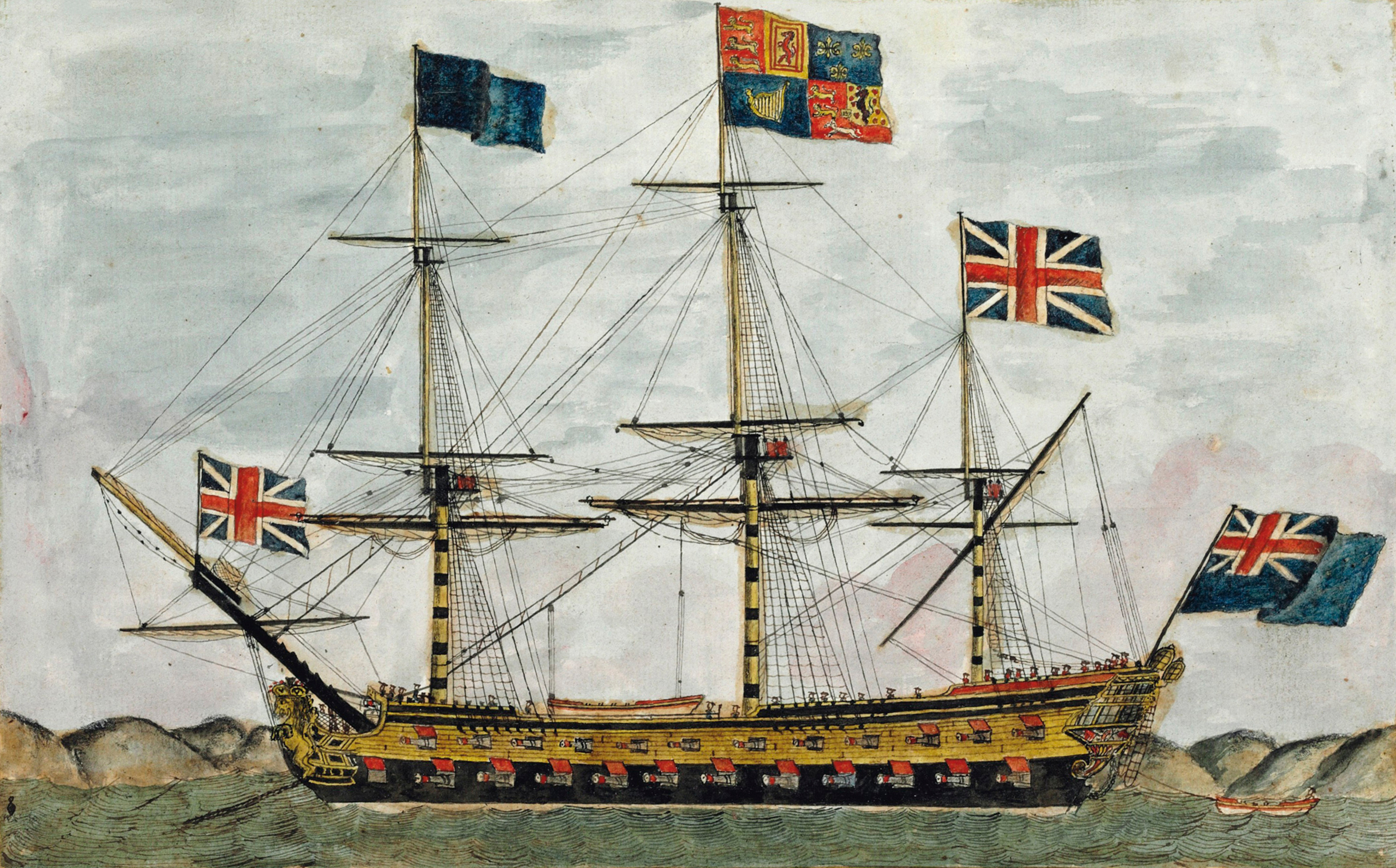
HMS Chatham (1758), a modified version of the 1745 Establishment 50-gun ships

In November 1752, the Admiralty approved a modification to the 1745 directions, which increased the length of the 50-gunner by 3 feet (914 mm) and reduced the beam by 1 foot (305 mm). The resulting vessel, HMS Chatham was more streamlined than her predecessors but she was the only one of her class built. Between Warwick being ordered on 13 December 1758 and laid down on 27 August 1762, the Admiralty had agreed to her being extended by a further four foot. She was launched on 28 February 1762, the longest and largest of her class and of all the subsequent 50-gun vessels until the Grampus-class in 1780. Measuring 151 feet (46.0 m) along the gun deck, 124 ft 7 1/4 in (38.0 m) at the keel, with a beam of 40 ft 3 in (12.3 m) and a depth in the hold of 18 ft 3 in (5.6 m), she came in at 1,073 71/94 tons burthen. The ship cost £20,493.8.10d to build plus another £8,620.1.6d for fitting out.

Warwick was a two-decker, meaning she had two continuous gun decks. The lower gundeck carried 22 number 12-pounder (5.4 kg) guns, while the upper gundeck bore the same amount of 12-pounder (5.4 kg) guns. She also carried a secondary armament on her upperworks comprising four 6 pounders (2.7 kilograms) on the quarterdeck and two on the forecastle.

== Service ==
Warwick was first commissioned during the Falkland Crisis. John Leveson-Gower assumed command in December 1770, but the ship was not ready to sail and the dispute was resolved in January 1771. Warwick was recommissioned under Captain Charles Leslie in February, and following her completion in March, she journeyed to the East Indies. She returned home in September 1772 under Captain Henry Lloyd and paid off in February 1775.

Warwick underwent a small repair and refit at Portsmouth in September 1776 which, by the time it had been completed in July 1777 had cost £13,964.7.11d. Joseph Norwood, who had been in command since March, was replaced by John Moutray in May. Warwick then served in home waters, sailing to meet an inbound convoy of East Indiamen on 5 February 1778. Recommissioned under Captain Richard Collins in August, Warwick joined Admiral Molyneux Shuldham's squadron at Plymouth in December. She continued with escort duties, bringing in another group of merchant ships from the East Indies on 7 March 1779 before paying off again in 1780.

A 3-month long refit began in June, which incorporated the coppering of the ship's hull. On completion, she sailed for North America, under her new captain George Elphinstone, who had taken command in July. Warwick was back in the Channel by the start of 1781, capturing the 50-gun Rotterdam on 5 January. The Dutch two-decker had, five days previously, been engaged by and struck to Isis but the inexperienced and depleted, British crew had failed to take possession of her.

Warwick returned to North America in March and on 18 May captured two American brigs, Elizabeth and Experiment, which were sailing under a letter-of-marque. Another privateer, a schooner called Greyhound, was captured by Warwick on 11 August. The same day, she was in sight, when other ships of her squadron recaptured the 34-gun storeship, HMS Minerva, and was thus entitled to a share of the prize money.

On 13 June, Warwick arrived with troops in Charleston. After debarkation, she sailed for Sandy Hook, arriving there on 26 June. By the end of July, Warwick had put in to New York harbour. Before the year was out, Warwick had added another brig, Betsy to her list of captures.

On 12 September 1782, Warwick, in the company of the 64-gun Lion, the 28-gun Vestal and the 14-gun Bonnetta, took the 22-gun privateer, Sophie. Later in the day, the British squadron spotted two French frigates and immediately gave chase. The frigates proved to be the 28-gun Aigle and the 32-gun Gloire, which had earlier in the day captured the 14-gun brig HMS Racoon. The chase continued into the following day when the French attempted to escape in the shallow waters around the Delaware where, despite the danger, the British followed. The Gloire, being of a lesser draught, escaped but on 14 September, Aigle ran aground. Surrounded by British ships and unable to return fire, she struck her colours.

While cruising in the company of HMS Jason and Grand, Warwick captured the brigs Phoenix on 7 September and Defence on 3 November.

At the beginning of 1783, Captain Samuel Clayton took command of Warwick but his tenure was short; she returned home and paid off in February. Fitted as a receiving ship, between May and September, at a cost of £2,051.6.7d, she remained in that role at Chatham until sold on 24 March 1802.

== Bibliography ==
- Clowes, William Laird (1997) [1900]. The Royal Navy, A History from the Earliest Times to 1900, Volume IV. London: Chatham Publishing. ISBN 1-86176-013-2.
- Gardiner, Robert (2004). Warships of the Napoleonic Era: Design, Development and Deployment. Barnsley: Seaforth Publishing. ISBN 978 1 84832 108 3.
- Winfield, Rif (2007). British Warships in the Age of Sail 1714–1792: Design, Construction, Careers and Fates. Barnsley: Seaforth Publishing. ISBN 978-1-84415-700-6.
