= French frigate Aigle (1782) =

Frigate of the French Navy

- 1782 ship plan of Aigle

History

France
- Name: Aigle
- Namesake: Eagle
- Builder: Dujardin, Saint Malo, plans by Jacques-Noël Sané
- Laid down: 1779
- Launched: 11 February 1780
- Acquired: April 1782 by purchase
- Fate: Captured 15 September 1782

Great Britain
- Name: HMS Aigle
- Acquired: September 1782 by capture
- Commissioned: December 1782
- Fate: Wrecked 19 August 1798

General characteristics
- Displacement: 1200 tonneaux
- Tons burthen: 650 port tonneaux; 1003 (bm)
- Length: 147 ft 5 in (44.9 m) at gun deck.; 37.29 metres at keel.
- Beam: 39 ft 3 in (12.0 m)
- Draught: 5.4 m (17.7 ft)
- Depth of hold: 12 ft 2 in (3.7 m)
- Propulsion: Sail
- Complement: French service:360; British service:280
- Armament: French service: 28 × 24-pounder long guns + 10-14 × 8-pounder guns; British service: Upper deck: 28 × 18-pounder guns; QD:8 × 9-pounder guns + 2 × 32-pounder carronades; Fc:2 × 9-pounder chase guns

Aigle was a 36-gun frigate launched in 1780 as a French privateer. The French Navy purchased and commissioned her in 1782, but a British squadron captured her in the action of 15 September 1782 and the frigate was subsequently commissioned into the Royal Navy as the 38-gun fifth-rate HMS Aigle in December of that year. During the French Revolutionary Wars she served primarily in the Mediterranean, where Aigle was wrecked on 19 August 1798.

== French career ==
Aigle was built as Saint-Malo as a privateer, and had a private career under Jean Dalbarade. The French Navy purchased her from shipowner Clonard for 450,000 Livres. Adapting the privateer to Navy standard was not trivial: she came armed with 28 British 24-pounder long guns, which had to be rebored or replaced to fire the larger French 24-pounder cannonballs, the weight of the French pound being heavier than the British pound. Her hull was coppered at Rochefort before she was commissioned in the Navy.

In early 1782, Captain Latouche assumed command of Aigle, which, along with the frigate Gloire under Captain de Vallongue, ferried funds and equipment for the fleet of Admiral Vaudreuil. The ship had a number of guests, among whom Gontaut de Lauzun, Vioménil, Montmorency-Laval, Chabannes, Vauban, Melfort, Talleyrand-Périgord, Champcenetz, Mac-Mahon, Fleury and American Major Porter. Gloire was similarly crowded with guests. Latouche had requested permission to bring along fast merchantmen to carry luggage, but Minister Castries denied his request. Nevertheless, the 22-gun merchantman Sophie, carrying Latouche's mistress, followed the division. Slower than the warships, she was in tow of Aigle for most of the cruise, and at night Latouche had the division stop to spend the night with his mistress. Vallongue wrote a letter to Castrie to protest. The division stopped at the Bay of Angra for three days, after which Sophie detached from the division, around 5 August.

On their way, Aigle and Gloire skirmished with the 74-gun HMS Hector in the night Action of 5 September 1782; Hector was sailing to Halifax, Nova Scotia, with a prize crew, under Captain John Bourchier, in a convoy under Rear-admiral Graves. Hector was saved from captured when the morning revealed the rest of the convoy and Latouche decided to retreat.

=== Capture ===
Aigle and Gloire captured HMS Racoon off the Delaware River on 12 September 1782. The following day, a small British squadron consisting of HMS Vestal, HMS Bonetta, and the prize Sophie, led by Captain G.K. Elphinston in HMS Warwick, sighted the three vessels anchored in the Delaware River off Cape Henlopen Light. The British set out in chase, but the French were able to navigate the sandbanks with the help of Racoon's pilot, who agreed to help the French for a payment of 500 Louis d'or. Still, Aigle ran aground, which enabled the British to capture her, and with her all of Racoon's crew. Aigle had had on board some senior French officers, who escaped ashore, as did the now-wealthy pilot. (Note: The French officers who escaped included "Baron Viomini" [sic] (commander of the French army), Mons. La Va de Montmerancy, Duke Laurun, Viscount de Fleury, and some others. They took most of the treasure she was carrying, as well.) Latouche had cut away her masts in an attempt to lighten her, and when that failed, had had holes bored in her hull. He remained with her and struck her colours on 15 September. (Note: Latouche was freed when the peace was signed in 1783.) Despite the attempts to scuttle Aigle, the British were able to refloat her and took her into service under her own name. Gloire and Racoon escaped.

== British career ==
The British commissioned Aigle under Captain Richard Creyk in December 1782 for the Leeward Islands station. She was paid off in August 1783.

In December 1792 Captain John Nicholson Inglefield commissioned Agile. On 7 April 1793 he sailed for the Mediterranean. Shortly thereafter, the British were dissatisfied with the actions of the neutral Genoa, in allowing the French frigate Modeste and two French tartanes to 'insult' and 'molest' Aigle while she was also in Genoa.

On 10 August 1794, Aigle was present at the surrender of Calvi, on the island of Corsica. She therefore shared in the first grant of £6000 in prize money.

In 1795 Captain Samuel Hood took command. On 9 December 1795, the French frigate Sensible and corvette Sardine captured Nemesis while she was at anchor in the neutral port of Smyrna. Nemesis did not resist but Samuel Hood Linzee, captain of Nemesis, protested the illegality of the action. The British frigates Aigle and Cyclops blockaded the three ships until Ganteaume's squadron drove the British ships off. The French sailed Nemesis to Tunis in January 1796, but the British recaptured her on 9 March. Samuel Hood's replacement, in April 1797, was Captain Charles Tyler. (Note: Tyler brought with him his protege George Nicholas Hardinge.)

In 1797 Aigle captured several French privateers. On 13 June she captured a brig of six guns and 24 men off Lisbon. The vessel was eight days out of Bordeaux, on her way to Île de France.

On 16 April, Aigle was in company with Boston when Boston captured the French privateer Enfant de la Patrie. Enfant de la Patrie was armed with 16 guns and had a crew of 130 men. She surrendered after a chase of six hours, and after her captain, who reportedly was drunk, had fired at Boston and run into her, with the result that five of his men were killed, he himself drowned, and ten men were wounded.

On 12 June, Aigle and Boston captured the French brig Henrietté. Henrietté (or Hariotte), was a privateer of six guns.

Then on 30 July, she, with Boston in company, captured the French privateer lugger Hazard of eight guns and 50 men. Hazard was from Bayonne, but on this cruise she had last left Corunna. She had made no captures. Then on 13 August Aigle captured the French privateer lugger La Manche (or La Mouche), of eight guns and eight swivel guns, and 49 men. She was 13 days out of Nantes and had made no captures. She was sent into Lisbon and sold there. Four days later, Tyler observed two vessels sailing out of the Bay of Lax. He ordered his lugger to cut them out. The weather prevented the lugger from bringing one out, a brig, so Tyler had her cargo of rice taken out and then burnt the vessel, which was Spanish, bound for Corunna.

On 13 October, Aigle and Boston captured the Spanish packet ship Patagon. She was sent into Lisbon and sold there.

At the end of November, on the 30th, Aigle captured a French privateer of four guns and 52 men. She had taken three English merchant vessels and sent one into Lachs Bay. Tyler sent Aigle's master, Mr. Tritton, with 20 men to bring her out. She turned out to be the Requin. That same evening they also captured a Spanish ship with a cargo of sardines, and sent her into Lisbon.

The day after Christmas, Aigle was in company with Aurora chased three vessels into the bay of Corunna, where they captured their quarry. Tyler left Aurora in charge of the prizes while he chased a strange sail. When he got back, he discovered that one had capsized, but her crew had been saved. The two remaining prizes were carrying hemp, coals, and nails.

On 4 January 1798 Aigle captured a French privateer off the coast of Corunna. The privateer carried 20 guns and crew of 90 men. She was eight days out of Lorient and had not made any captures. Tyler noted that the prize was coppered and a fast sailer. She turned out to be Minerve.

On 13 January Gorgon captured the French privateer Henri, from Nantes. She carried 14 guns, five of which she had thrown overboard during the chase. She also had a crew of 108 men. She had been cruising for five days but had taken nothing. Captain Richard Williams of Gorgon put a prize crew aboard and took her with him into Lisbon. The prize crew consisted mostly of 16 men from Aigle, plus Mr. Tritton.

== Fate ==
Aigle was under Tyler's command when she was wrecked on 19 August 1798 on Plane Island off Cape Farina, Tunisia, due to an error in navigation. All the crew were saved. Tyler was also acquitted of the loss.
