= Cape Farina =

Headland in Bizerte Governorate, Tunisia

Cape Farina Ras et-Tarf Ras Sidi Ali el-Mekki
- Cape
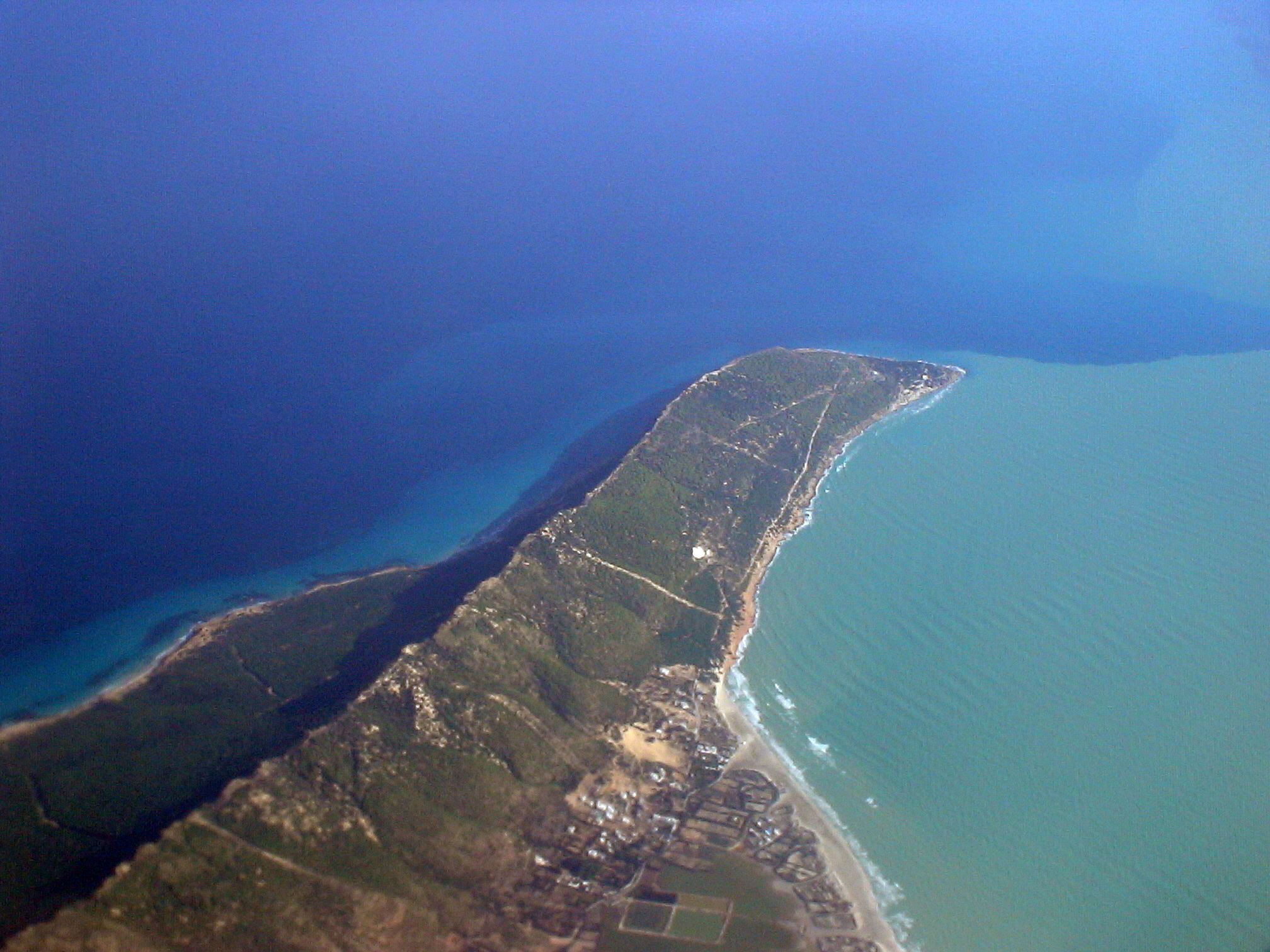
- View of the cape

- Coordinates: 37°10′48″N 10°16′48″E
- Location: Bizerte Governorate, Tunisia

Cape Farina (French: Cap Farina) is a headland in Bizerte Governorate, Tunisia. It forms the northwestern end of the Gulf of Tunis. The Tunisian towns of Ghar el-Melh (the ancient Castra Delia), Rafraf, Lahmeri, and the beach of Plage Sidi Ali Mekki Est are located along the peninsula.

== Names ==
The cape was known to the Phoenicians and Carthaginians as 𐤓𐤀𐤔 𐤀𐤔𐤌𐤍, meaning the Cape of Eshmun, a healing god in the Phoenician pantheon whom the Greeks and Romans variously interpreted as Asclepius or Apollo. From this, the cape's name was interpreted by Greco-Roman authors as Rusucmona and was known under Roman rule as the Cape of Apollo (Latin: Apollinis Promontorium) or of the Beautiful One (Pulchri Promontorium).

Its modern Arabic names are Ras et-Tarf or Ras Sidi Ali el-Mekki.

== Geography ==
The extremity of Cape Farina forms the northwestern end of the Gulf of Tunis. The geological formation responsible for Cape Farina continues underwater before rising to form Plane Island 3.75 kilometers (2.3 mi) offshore.

== History ==
Under Roman rule, the peninsula preserved an ancient and important temple to "Apollo", probably representing a continuation of the Carthaginian worship of the healing god Eshmun. The settlement at Castra Delia (modern-day Ghar el-Melh), the largest on the peninsula, was also sometimes known by the peninsula's latinized Punic name as "Rusucmona".

Under Turkish rule, Porto Farina (modern-day Ghar el-Melh) was a well-fortified base for piracy. This caused it to be the scene of the 1655 English assault wherein naval bombardment completely overwhelmed shore defenses for the first time.

== Gallery ==
A French topographical map of the Gulf of Tunis

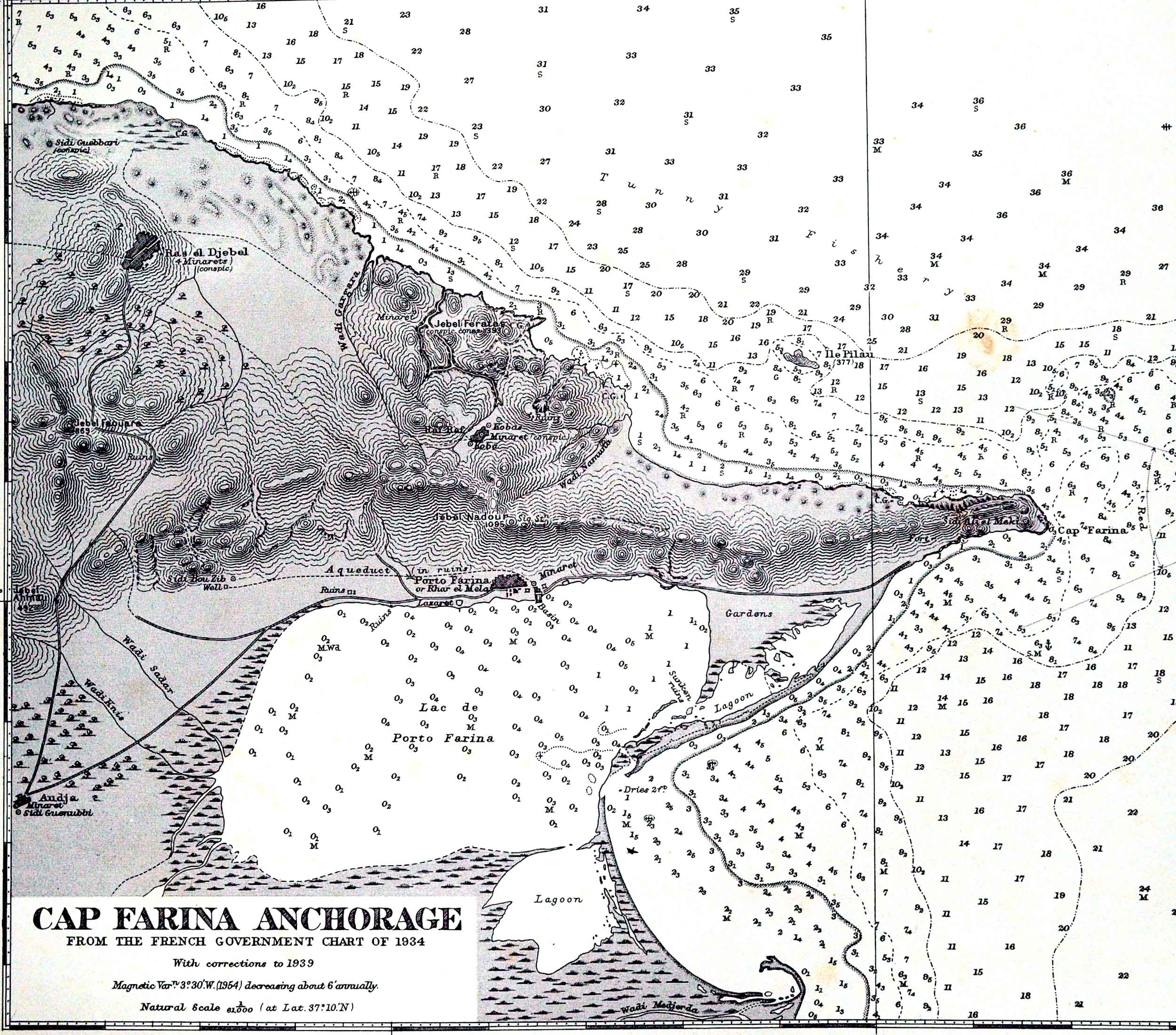
A French nautical chart of the Cape Farina anchorage in 1939

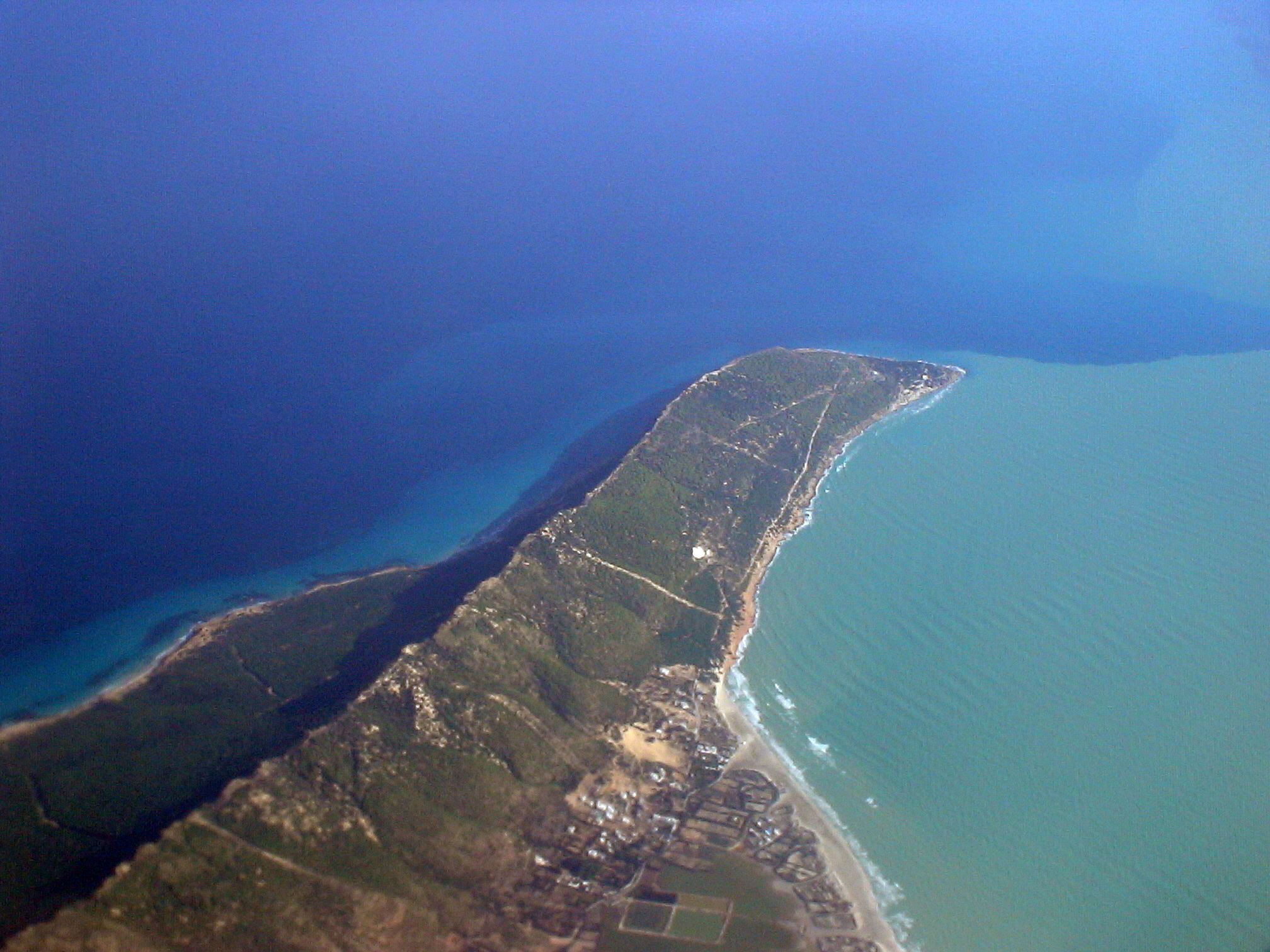
An aerial view of Cape Farina from the west

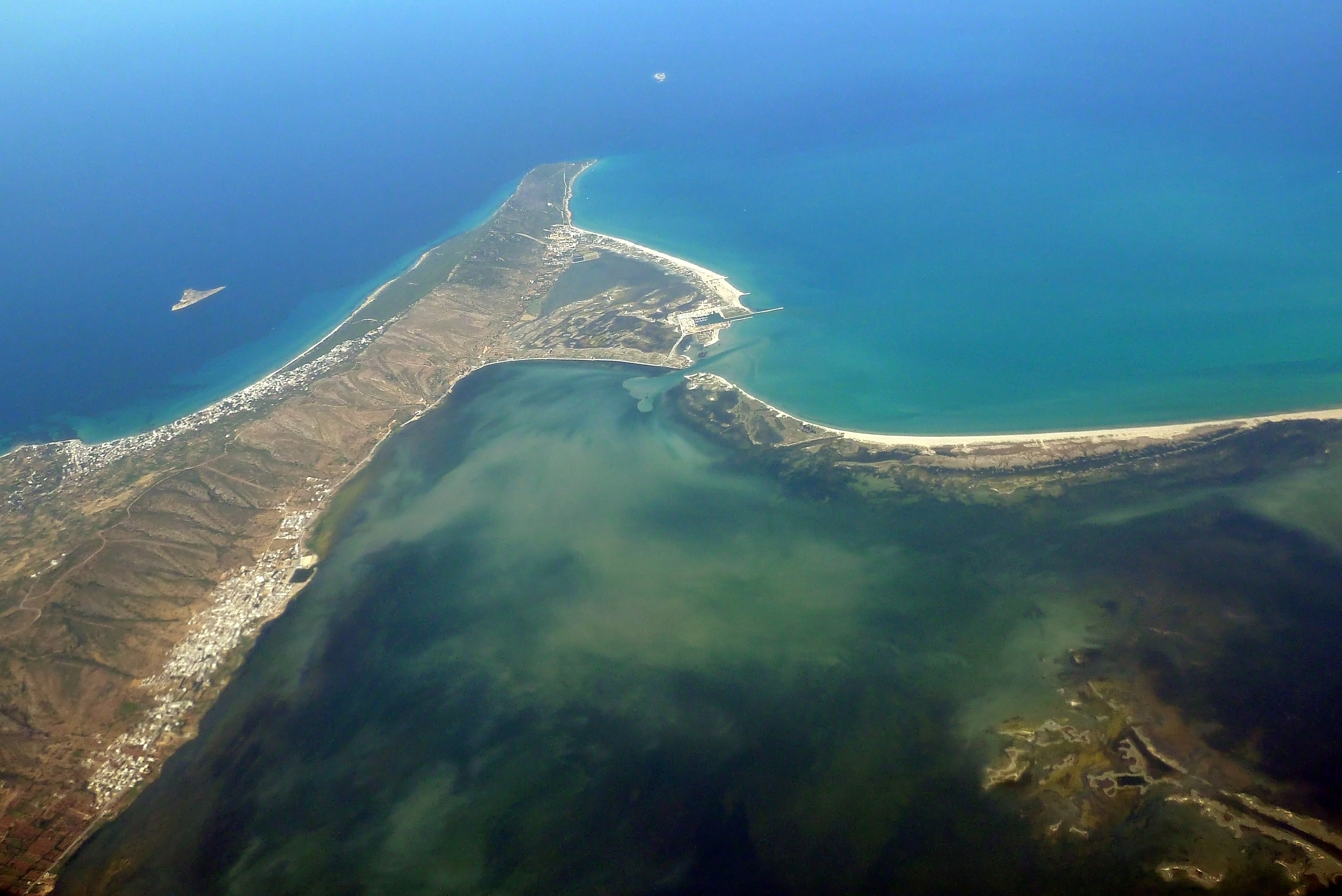
An aerial view of Cape Farina from the southwest
