= HMS Racoon (1782) =

Brig-sloop of the Royal Navy

History

Great Britain
- Name: HMS Racoon
- Commissioned: August 1782
- Out of service: 12 September 1782

General characteristics
- Class & type: brig-sloop
- Armament: 14 guns

HMS Racoon was a 14-gun two-masted brig-sloop of the Royal Navy, purchased for service during the American Revolutionary War. She was commissioned in August 1782 under the command of Lieutenant (and later Admiral) Edmund Nagle, but was captured and destroyed four weeks later by the French frigate Aigle.

== Naval service ==
Racoon was one of at least forty North American merchant vessels purchased by the Royal Navy between 1775 and 1784 to bolster Britain's offensive capacity against the combined naval forces of France, Spain and the American colonies. Before her purchase in mid-1782, she had been the mercantile brig Lovely Sally. She was two-masted, but her age and dimensions are otherwise unrecorded. She was commissioned on 1 August 1782 under Lieutenant Edmund Nagle who was transferred aboard after four months in command of the 14-gun sloop Polecat.

Britain's naval capacity was tested by France's successful Hudson Bay raids in the week after Racoon's launch. The newly purchased brig was immediately put to sea, and was cruising off the mouth of the Delaware River when she encountered the 38-gun French frigate Aigle and her sister ship Gloire. Racoon was smaller and slower than the French frigates, and Nagle had few alternatives other than surrender. He and his crew were held aboard Aigle until it in turn was captured by larger British vessels. All of Racoon's crew were freed, except the ship's pilot who chose to remain with the French when they fled in Aigle's boats ahead of the British capture.
