= Robert Linzee =

Royal Navy officer (1739–1804)

Admiral Robert Linzee
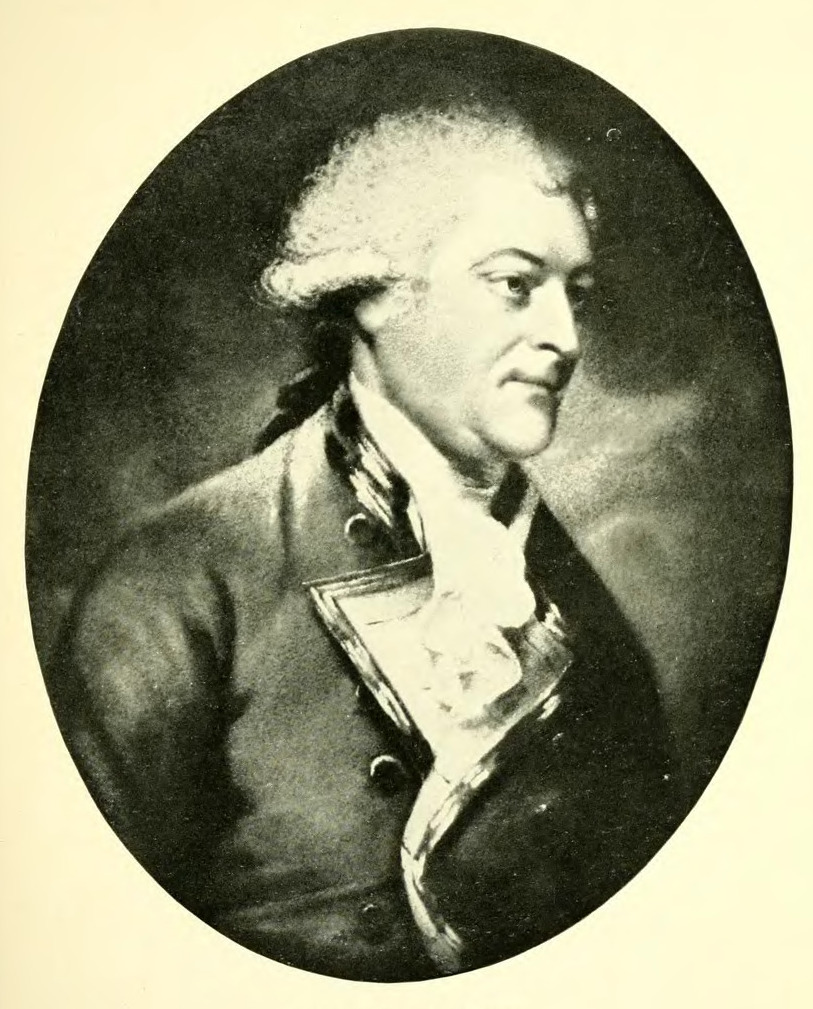
- Born: 1739; Portsmouth, Hampshire
- Died: 4 October 1804; Wickham, Hampshire
- Burial place: Wickham, Hampshire
- Military career
- Allegiance: Great Britain; United Kingdom
- Branch: Royal Navy
- Service years: –1804
- Rank: Admiral of the Blue
- Commands: HMS Viper; HMS Surprize; HMS Thetis; HMS Magnificent; HMS Saturn; HMS Alcide
- Conflicts: Seven Years' War; American Revolutionary War; Relief of Quebec; Action of 9 August 1780; Battle of the Saintes; Battle of the Mona Passage; Action of 15 February 1783; French Revolutionary Wars; Siege of Toulon; Capture of Corsica; Naval Battle of Genoa; Naval Battle of Hyères Islands; Napoleonic Wars

Admiral of the Blue Robert Linzee (1739 – 4 October 1804) was a Royal Navy officer who served in the American War of Independence and the French Revolutionary and Napoleonic Wars.

Linzee entered the navy and was promoted to lieutenant during the Seven Years' War. He was advanced to his own commands shortly before the outbreak of the American War of Independence and served off the North American coast and in the Caribbean during that conflict. He saw important service against privateers as a frigate captain before advancing to command a ship of the line despite the loss of one of his ships. He saw action in several important battles, commanding a ship at the Battle of the Saintes and at the Battle of the Mona Passage. Left without a ship after the peace, he briefly commissioned a ship during the Spanish Armament, but paid her off after the crisis passed.

He was back in service after the outbreak of the French Revolutionary Wars, taking a ship out to the Mediterranean, and quickly being appointed a commodore with orders to assist the Corsican patriots against the French. Linzee commanded a small squadron in the area supporting Corsican and British efforts to dislodge the French. He later became a junior flag officer in the Mediterranean Fleet. He fought in two fleet actions in 1795, at Genoa and then at Hyères Islands. He returned to Britain shortly after Sir John Jervis took over command in the Mediterranean. He did not serve at sea again, though he continued to be promoted, rising to the rank of admiral of the blue before his death in 1804.

== Family and early life ==
Robert Linzee was born in Portsmouth, Hampshire in 1739 and baptised there on 13 February 1740, the youngest child of five sons and five daughters born to Edward Linzee and his wife Anne Newnham. Edward Linzee was a burgess and several times mayor of Portsmouth and the Linzees were a significant local family.

Linzee entered the navy and saw service during the Seven Years' War, being promoted to lieutenant on 29 January 1761. He was advanced to commander on 25 November 1768 and given command of the 10-gun sloop HMS Viper, based at Boston in 1769. His promotion to post-captain followed soon after, on 3 October 1770, and took command of the 50-gun HMS Romney that month. Romney was at this time flying the broad pennant of Commodore Samuel Hood, and Linzee remained in command until she was paid off in March 1771.

== American War of Independence ==
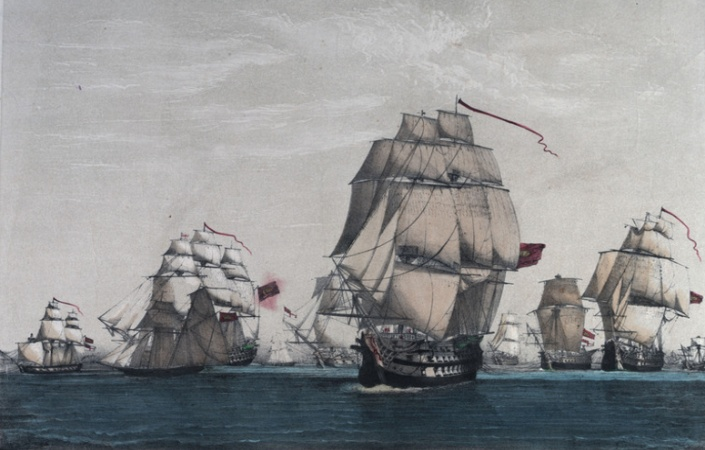
Spanish watercolour depicting the capture of most of the merchants in Sir John Moutray's convoy

In February 1775 he took command of the new 28-gun sixth rate HMS Surprize and sailed for Newfoundland in May that year. He participated in the Relief of Quebec the following year, before undertaking cruises against American shipping. Surprize captured the American privateers Maria, on 7 May, and Gaspee, on 15 May 1776. Linzee returned to Newfoundland in January the following year, spending 1777 and part of 1778 off the North American coast, capturing another American privateer, Harlequin, on 7 September 1778. Linzee then took Surprize back to Britain to be refitted and coppered. Linzee's next command, from 1780, was the 32-gun HMS Thetis. He was sent out as a convoy escort under the command of Captain Sir John Moutray, and managed to escape when the convoy was largely overwhelmed and captured on 9 August 1780 by a Spanish fleet under Luis de Córdova y Córdova. Linzee then joined the squadron dispatched to the West Indies under Samuel Hood in November 1780, and remained serving in the Leeward Islands the following year. On 12 May 1781 Thetis struck a rock off Saint Lucia and was wrecked.

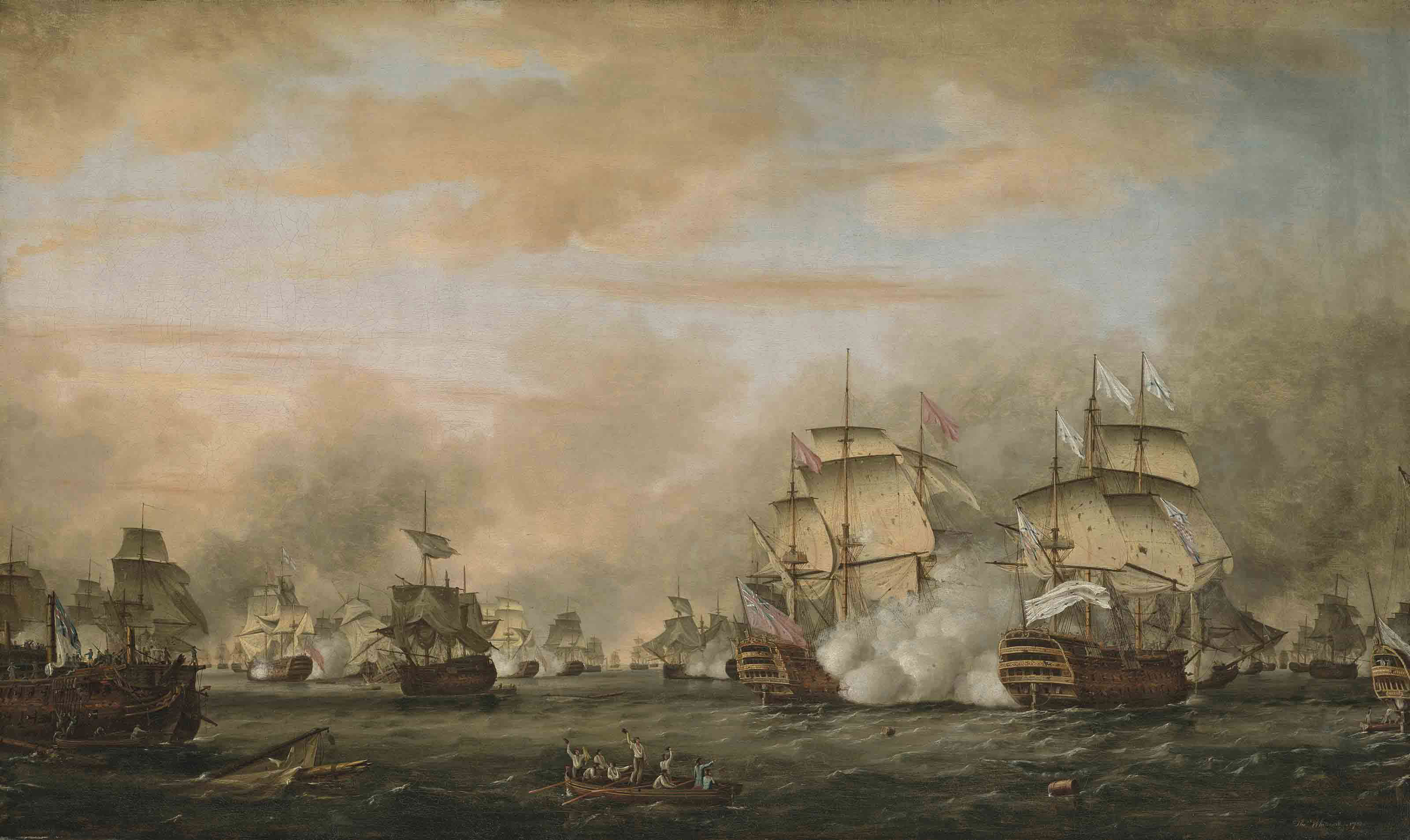
The Battle of the Saintes, 12 April 1782: surrender of the Ville de Paris by Thomas Whitcombe, painted 1783, shows Hood's HMS Barfleur, centre, attacking the French flagship Ville de Paris, right.

Linzee's career survived the customary court martial for the loss of his ship and in November 1781 he commissioned the 74-gun HMS Magnificent for service. He resumed his service in the Caribbean by returning to the Leeward Islands in February 1782, and went on to see action in a number of important engagements between British and French fleets. He was present with Admiral Sir George Rodney's fleet at the first indecisive clash with the Comte de Grasse's force in the Dominica Channel on 9 April, and then again at Rodney's decisive victory over de Grasse three days later at the Battle of the Saintes on 12 April. Linzee was one of those dispatched a few days later under Sir Samuel Hood to search for more French ships, and was in action again on 19 April at the Battle of the Mona Passage. In the British victory that resulted, Magnificent played a significant role in chasing down and capturing the 32-gun frigate Aimable, at the cost to herself of four killed and eight wounded.

Linzee left the Caribbean for North America in July 1782 with Admiral Hugh Pigot's force, and spent September and October at New York. He participated in the blockade of Cap-François in November 1782, and on 12 February 1783 Magnificent sailed from Gros Islet Bay on a cruise in company with the 64-gun ships HMS Prudent and HMS St Albans. On 15 February 1783 Magnificent sighted the 36-gun French frigate Concorde and gave chase. She was close enough to identify the mysterious ship as a frigate by 18:00, and by 20:00 as darkness fell Concorde opened fire on her pursuer with her stern guns. Magnificent overhauled the French ship by 21:15, and after fifteen minutes forced her to strike her colours. Magnificent took possession of Concorde, described as carrying 36 guns and 300 men and under the command of M. le Chevalier du Clesmaur. Shortly after her surrender the Concorde's maintopsail caught fire, forcing the crew to cut away the mainmast to extinguish it. Prudent and St Albans came up two hours later and Magnificent towed Concorde to St. John's, Antigua. The American War of Independence ended shortly afterwards, and Linzee took Magnificent back to Britain to be paid off.

== Peace and French Revolutionary Wars ==
The peace between the end of the American War of Independence in 1783 and the outbreak of the French Revolutionary Wars in 1793 resulted in the drawdown of the navy, and Linzee does not appear to have had any commands except for a short period during the Spanish Armament in early 1790. He commissioned the 74-gun HMS Saturn in May 1790, and sailed her from Portsmouth to St Helens in June to join the Channel Fleet under Samuel Barrington, and later Lord Howe. The crisis eventually passed without breaking into open war, and Linzee duly paid Saturn off in September 1791. Linzee was appointed a Colonel of Marines in March 1793, shortly after the outbreak of the French Revolutionary Wars.

He was given command of the 74-gun HMS Alcide that month, and went out to join Lord Hood's fleet off Toulon in April. He supported the defence of Toulon, and was appointed a commodore in September, raising his broad pennant aboard Alcide. Hood then dispatched him with a small force, consisting of the 74-gun ships HMS Alcide and HMS Courageux, the 64-gun HMS Ardent, the 32-gun HMS Lowestoffe and the 28-gun HMS Nemesis, to support the Corsican insurgents under General Pasquale Paoli. The squadron carried out several attacks on fortified French positions, but the British could render little material assistance until the landing of an expeditionary force under Lieutenant-General David Dundas and the reinforcement of the British blockade with extra ships from the Mediterranean Fleet. In one such attack, on 30 September 1793, Linzee took his squadron in to bombard Forneille, but suffered a number of casualties without inflicting appreciable damage. Linzee was then sent with his force to Tunis to attempt to capture or destroy the French 74-gun Duquesne and some gunboats, but the dey refused to allow any violation of his neutrality.

== Flag rank ==
Linzee was promoted to rear-admiral of the white on 12 April 1794. He remained with Alcide, passing command of her to his flag captain, Thomas Shivers. Linzee shifted his flag later that year to the 98-gun HMS Windsor Castle, at first commanded by Captain Edward Cooke, and then from October by Captain William Shield. Linzee remained active in the operations off Corsica during this time. While anchored in San Fiorenzo Bay on 10 November 1794, a mutiny broke out aboard his ship. The mutineers declared that they were unhappy with the admiral, captain, first lieutenant and boatswain. Hotham, Rear-Admiral Hyde Parker, and several senior captains went aboard Windsor Castle to try to persuade the men to return to their duties. Shield requested a court martial to investigate his conduct, which was granted and honourably acquitted him. The mutiny was suppressed in time, the mutineers being pardoned by Hotham, and shortly after this Shield left the ship and was replaced by Captain John Gore, while a new first lieutenant and boatswain were also appointed.

Linzee then went on to serve as one of the junior flag officers of the Mediterranean Fleet, seeing action under Hood's replacement, Lord Hotham. Still flying his flag aboard Windsor Castle Linzee was in action at the Naval Battle of Genoa on 14 March, and the Naval Battle of Hyères Islands on 13 July 1795. He had been promoted to vice-admiral shortly before the latter battle, on 1 June 1795. He briefly flew his flag aboard the 100-gun HMS Victory between October and November 1795, in the short interim between Hotham's departure, and the arrival of the new commander, Admiral Sir John Jervis. After serving for a brief period under Jervis, Linzee finally returned to Britain aboard HMS Princess Royal in June 1796, escorting several merchant convoys. Linzee appears to have had no further active commands, although he was promoted to the rank of admiral of the blue on 1 January 1801. Admiral Robert Linzee died on 4 October 1804, at the age of 64, at Wickham, Hampshire. He was buried in the church there.

== Family and issue ==
Linzee was twice married. He married his first wife, Ann Redstone, on 9 October 1771. She died on 26 July 1781, and Robert remarried on 2 February 1792, uniting with the 21-year-old Mary Grant. She survived her husband, and later remarried. Robert Linzee had a single son with his first wife, born circa 1774 and named Edward Linzee. Edward did not follow his father into the navy, but entered the Church.
