= Charles Inglis (Royal Navy officer, died 1791) =

Royal Navy admiral

Rear-Admiral Charles Inglis
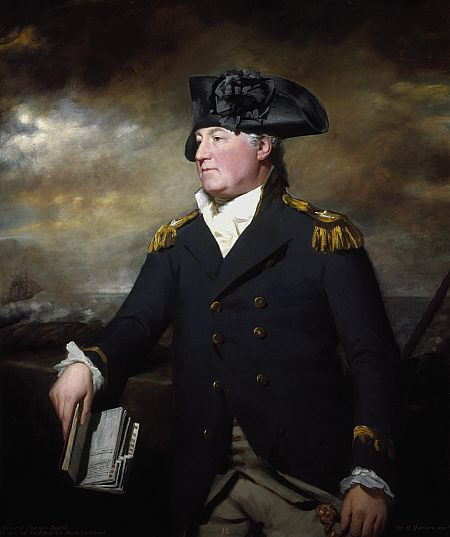
- Portrait by Sir Henry Raeburn, c. 1783
- Born: c. 1731
- Died: 10 October 1791
- Relatives: Sir John Inglis (father); Adam Cockburn, Lord Ormiston (grandfather); Charles Inglis (son)
- Military career
- Allegiance: Great Britain
- Branch: Royal Navy
- Service years: 1745–1791
- Rank: Rear-Admiral of the Blue
- Commands: HMS Escorte; HMS Carcass; HMS Newark; HMS Lizard; HMS Salisbury; HMS St Albans
- Conflicts: War of the Austrian Succession; Second Battle of Cape Finisterre; Seven Years' War; Raid on Rochefort; Raid on Le Havre; American War of Independence; Action of 12 December 1779; Relief of Gibraltar; Battle of Saint Kitts; Battle of the Saintes

Charles Inglis (c. 1731 – 10 October 1791) was an officer of the Royal Navy who saw service during the War of the Austrian Succession, the Seven Years' War, and the American War of Independence, rising to the rank of rear-admiral.

Inglis was born into a gentry family and embarked on a career in the navy, serving at first under Captain George Brydges Rodney. He saw action with Rodney at the Second Battle of Cape Finisterre, and was left without a ship after the end of the War of the Austrian Succession. Family friends and connections may have helped him receive new postings, and he was promoted to lieutenant during the Seven Years' War. After serving on several different ships, he was given his own commands, in which he took part in operations off the French coast, including one led by his old commander Rodney. Peace once again brought temporary inactivity for Inglis, though he briefly commissioned a ship during the Falklands Crisis.

Back in service again with the outbreak of the American War of Independence, Inglis served in the Caribbean, where he captured a large Spanish privateer. He was in Sir Samuel Hood's fleet at the Battle of Saint Kitts in 1781, and, in 1782, fought at the Battle of the Saintes, where his old commander, now Admiral Sir George Rodney, defeated a French fleet. Inglis was given command of a small squadron of his own and cruised with some success during the last years of the war, capturing a French frigate. He retired ashore after the end of the war, was promoted to rear-admiral in 1790, and died the following year.

== Family and early life ==
Inglis was born c. 1731, the fourth son of Sir John Inglis and his wife Anne, the daughter of Adam Cockburn. He embarked on a naval career, at first joining the 40-gun HMS Ludlow Castle under Captain George Brydges Rodney, in 1745, and the next year went with Rodney to the 60-gun HMS Eagle. Rodney carried out several successful cruises, capturing four ships from a French convoy in June 1747, and fighting under Rear-Admiral Edward Hawke at his clash with Desherbiers de l'Etenduère's fleet at the Second Battle of Cape Finisterre on 25 October 1747. Inglis saw action on both of these occasions. Eagle was heavily engaged with the French 70-gun Neptune in the latter engagement and suffered considerable damage. She was paid off in August 1748 on the conclusion of the peace, and Inglis was left without a ship. He remained unemployed until 1750, when he joined the 50-gun HMS Tavistock, at that time under the command of Captain Francis Holburne. Inglis's biographer, P. K. Crimmin noted that like Inglis, Holburne was a lowland Scot, and that Inglis may have been benefiting during this time from a network of patronage that included John Cockburn, Inglis's uncle and a Lord of the Admiralty between 1727 and 1732 and again during 1742 and 1744, and Sir John Clerk, a friend of the family with considerable political influence.

Inglis passed his lieutenant's examination on 6 February 1755, having by now spent ten years serving in the navy. He was appointed to the 74-gun HMS Monarch, at that time under the command of Captain Abraham North, and by April 1756 had been transferred to HMS Magnanime, also of 74 guns, under Captain Wittewronge Taylor. Inglis followed Taylor to his next two commands, the 90-gun HMS Marlborough, and then on 3 June 1757, the 84-gun HMS Royal William. He was then promoted to commander and received his first independent command on 17 June 1757, that of the 14-gun sloop HMS Escorte.^{[a]} Inglis was initially assigned to support Hawke's September 1757 Rochefort expedition, which ultimately failed to take the town. His next appointment was to the newly completed bomb vessel HMS Carcass in June 1759, which was assigned to support the attack on Le Havre the following month, conducted by Inglis's old commander, George Brydges Rodney. The expedition succeeded in its aim of destroying a large number of flat-bottomed boats which had been assembled in the port, thus frustrating a planned invasion attempt. Carcass is next recorded as having sailed to the Mediterranean in May 1759, though she was back in England by the following year, being paid off at Sheerness in September 1760.

== Captaincy ==
At some point after this Inglis was advanced to post-captain, and on 15 December 1761 he was given command of the 80-gun HMS Newark. She hoisted the broad pennant of Commodore Sir Peircy Brett in January 1762, and sailed for Mediterranean that month to reinforce Admiral Sir Charles Saunders's squadron in anticipation of the entry of Spain to the war. There was no fleet action, and Newark was still in the Mediterranean in 1762, when she supported the re-occupation of Menorca. The island was eventually returned to the British under the terms of the Treaty of Paris. Inglis sailed Newark back to Britain with the fleet after the peace, and paid her off in August 1763. Her decommissioning once again left Inglis without a ship, and it was not until September 1770 that the Falklands Crisis brought an opportunity for further employment.^{[b]}

As tensions between Britain and Spain over ownership of the Falkland Islands increased, the Royal Navy hastily commissioned and prepared for service a number of ships in the anticipation of war. Inglis's old commander, now Admiral Holburne, was a member of the Board of Admiralty, and may have had a hand in arranging his appointment to one of these ships, the 28-gun HMS Lizard. The appointment was short-lived; the Spanish backed down after failing to gain French support for their claims and the threat of war passed. The navy demobilised many of its ships, and Inglis returned to half-pay.

== American War of Independence ==
Once again Inglis was reliant on a war to return him to service. He commissioned the 50-gun HMS Salisbury in August 1778 and sailed for Jamaica in January 1779. On 12 December she was sailing in the Bay of Honduras, when at daybreak a large ship was sighted ahead. Inglis gave chase, a pursuit which lasted all day until Salisbury came in range at 6.30pm. The fleeing ship hoisted Spanish colours and an action began, which last until 8.30pm when the Spanish ship had her mainmast shot away. Having sustained heavy casualties and suffered considerable damage, she struck her colours. She was found to be the 50-gun privateer San Carlos, carrying stores and 397 men. Four men were killed on Salisbury and fourteen wounded, five mortally.^{[c]} Inglis continued off North America until the summer of 1780, when he returned to England, paying Salisbury off in August that year.

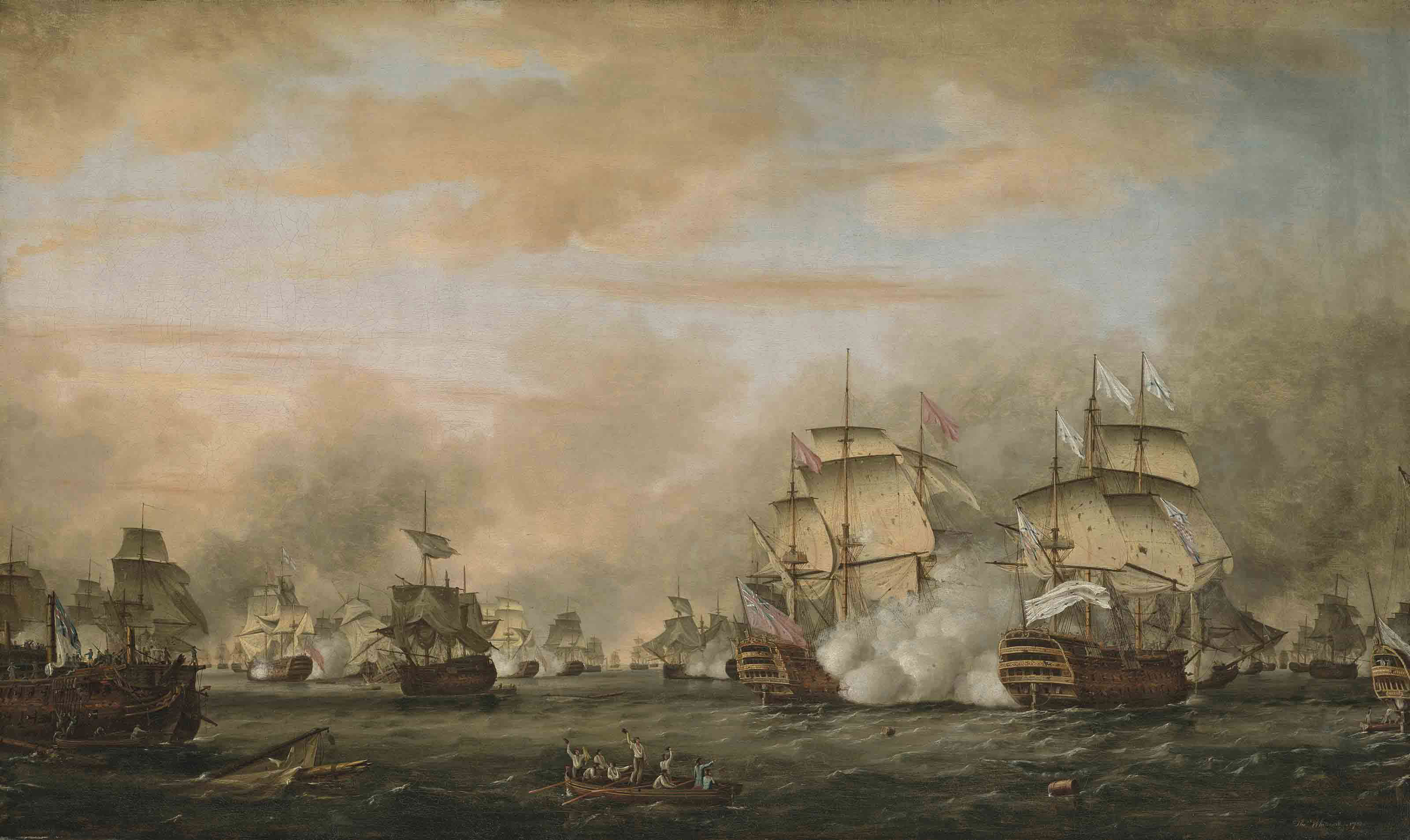
The Battle of the Saintes, 12 April 1782: surrender of the Ville de Paris by Thomas Whitcombe, painted 1783

Inglis's next command was the 64-gun HMS St Albans, which he took over in November 1780, sailing in April the following year with Vice-Admiral George Darby's fleet to the relief of Gibraltar. He was with Admiral Robert Digby's squadron later that year, before being sent to the Leeward Islands to join Sir Samuel Hood at Barbados. He served with Hood during the Battle of Saint Kitts, when Hood attempted to relieve the island and repulsed several attacks by the Comte de Grasse on 25 and 26 January 1782. Inglis was again in action with the French on 9 April, when Hood's fleet clashed with de Grasse's in the Dominica Channel, and fought at the Battle of the Saintes on 12 April, where the main British fleet under Inglis's old captain, now Admiral Sir George Rodney, decisively defeated de Grasse. St Albans had six men wounded during this engagement. Inglis sailed to North America in late July 1782 with Rodney's successor, Admiral Hugh Pigot. He was back in the West Indies by November, and was given command of a squadron of four ships cruising independently there. The squadron, consisting of St Albans, the 64-gun HMS Prudent, the 74-gun HMS Magnificent and the sloop HMS Barbados, was sent from Gros Islet Bay on 12 February to investigate reports of a French squadron, consisting of Triton, Amphion and several frigates, having sailed from Martinique.

On 15 February 1783 the frigate Concorde was sighted by the 74-gun HMS Magnificent, under Captain Robert Linzee. Magnificent was close enough to identify the mysterious ship as a frigate by 18:00, and by 20:00 as darkness fell Concorde opened fire on her pursuer with her stern guns. Magnificent overhauled the French ship by 21:15, and after fifteen minutes forced her to strike her colours. Magnificent took possession of Concorde, the latter being described as carrying 36 guns and 300 men, and being under the command of M. le Chevalier du Clesmaur. Shortly after surrendering the Concorde's maintopsail caught fire, forcing the crew to cut away the mainmast to extinguish it. Prudent and St Albans came up two hours later and Magnificent towed Concorde to St. John's, Antigua. Concorde was afterwards brought into the navy as HMS Concorde.

== Later life ==
Inglis sailed St Albans back to Britain in July 1783 and paid her off on the conclusion of the war. He saw no further service at sea, though he continued to be promoted on the basis of his seniority, being made rear-admiral of the blue on 21 September 1790. He died on 10 October 1791, at his brother's seat near Edinburgh. His biographer, P. K. Crimmin, assessed him as being 'a capable and competent officer without being inspired or presented with fortunate opportunities.' There are no details of Inglis having married, and Wood's The Ancient and Modern State of the Parish of Cramond stated that he died unmarried, but he is known to have had at least one child, a son, Charles Inglis. The younger Charles Inglis followed his father into the navy, served in several engagements of the French Revolutionary and Napoleonic Wars, and died in 1833 with the rank of post-captain.

== Notes ==
a. Escorte was a former French privateer under the name Scott. She had been captured on 24 February 1757 by HMS Badger. A clerk erroneously recorded the French name as Escorte, a name which subsequently stuck.

b. Charnock wrote that Inglis had been moved to command a fifth rate shortly after commissioning Newark, but could not say which one, or on what service. Winfield does not list Inglis in command of any of the fifth rates in service at the time, and the Oxford Dictionary of National Biography states Inglis returned to Britain in Newark in 1763.

c. Winfield includes 'in Action off Monte Christi 20 June 1780'. An action was fought off Monte Christi on 20 March 1780 between a French squadron under Toussaint-Guillaume Picquet de la Motte and a British squadron under William Cornwallis, but Salisbury was not present. Cornwallis again encountered a French fleet, on 20 June 1780, but off Bermuda. Again Salisbury was not one of the ships involved.
