= Hillsborough (1774 ship) =

History

Great Britain
- Name: Hillsborough
- Owner: Charles Foulis
- Operator: British East India Company
- Builder: Perry & Co., Blackwall Yard
- Cost: £8676
- Launched: 23 July 1774
- Captured: 1780

Kingdom of Spain
- Name: Santa Balbina
- Captured: 1780
- Fate: Sold for breaking up 1794

General characteristics
- Tons burthen: 741, or 74111/94, or 76459/94 (bm)
- Length: 137 ft 0 in (41.8 m), or 116 ft 10 in (35.6 m) (overall); 100 ft 0 1/2 in (30.5 m) (keel)
- Beam: 35 ft 7 in (10.8 m)
- Depth of hold: 14 ft 2 in (4.3 m)
- Armament: Indiaman: 30 guns; Spanish Navy: 24 × 8 + 10 × 4-pounder guns

Hillsborough was a three-decker East Indiaman launched in 1774. She made two voyages to India and China for the British East India Company. Her voyages took place during the American War of Independence, and she had just set out on her third voyage when a Spanish fleet captured her on 9 August 1780, together with almost the entire convoy of which she was a member. The Spanish Navy took her into service as Santa Balbina, a frigate of 34 guns. She was sold in 1794 for breaking up.

== Voyages ==
=== Voyage #1 (1775–1776) ===
Captain Robert Preston left Portsmouth on 19 March 1775, bound for Madras and Bengal. Hillsborough reached Madeira on 16 April, Madeira, Johanna on 6 August, and Madras on 15 September, and arrived at Kedgeree on 24 October. On her return voyage she passed Barrabulla (or Barra Bulla), either the sandbank or head on the Hooghli River, on 22 January 1776. She reached Madras again on 9 February, St Helena on 25 May, and the Downs on 18 August.

=== Voyage #2 (1778–1780) ===
Captain Pitt Collett left Plymouth on 9 February 1778, bound for Madras and China. Hillsborough reached False Bay on 21 April, Madras on 19 June, and Malacca on 26 August, and arrived at Whampoa on 27 September. She started home, crossing the Second Bar, about 20 miles down river from Whampoa, on 2 March 1779. She reached Balambangan on 1 June, St Helena on 24 September, and the Downs on 12 Jan 1780.

=== Voyage #3 (1780–loss) ===
Collett and Hillsborough left Portsmouth on 27 July 1780, as part of an enormous convoy of 63 merchantmen, including four more East Indiamen, Gatton, Godfrey, Mountstuart, and Royal George. Hillsborough was bound for Madras and Bengal, though the other vessels had diverse destinations, almost all being bound to the West Indies. The entire convoy was under the escort of HMS Ramillies, under the command of Sir John Moutray, and three frigates, including the 36-gun frigates HMS Thetis and HMS Southampton.

On 8 August 1780 unusual sails were seen. Moutray signalled his ships to alter course and follow him close to the wind. They paid no attention to his orders. Unfortunately, the strange sails were a Spanish naval fleet, under the command of Admiral Luis de Córdova y Córdova, together with a squadron of French ships. The British convoy and their Spanish and French forces met at 36°28′N 15°20′W.

A frigate flotilla, commanded by Santiago de Liniers and part of the Concepción squadron, captured Hillsborough.

We received fourteen shot from one of the seventy-four's had two men killed and six wounded, our bowspirit shot and shivered up as far as the gammoning, when we struck to the Ferme, a 74 (Spanish). We were all, except the ladies and their husbands, the captains, first and second officers, and about six other gentlemen, ordered on board the Ferme: but on going on board, had it in our option to return; which we all did; and we met with the greatest civility, humanity, and generosity on board [...] The great kindness of the Spaniards makes our situation scarcely felt, as everything is done by them to alleviate our misfortune; and we have never yet felt that we were prisoners

— Officer of East Indiaman Hillsborough, Cádiz, August 25, 1780.

The British warships escaped with eight of the convoy. The enemy captured the other 55 merchantmen, including the five East Indiamen and their cargoes worth £1.5 million, and 2,805 prisoners. It was a blow to British commerce, and especially to the forces in the West Indies, which lost a vast quantity of military stores.

== Spanish Navy and fate ==
The Spaniards took their prizes into Cádiz. Spanish reports indicate that "Helsbrek" had on board 130 men, apparently all crew. (Some of the other Indiamen were also carrying troops, women, and other passengers in addition to their crew.)

The Spanish Navy took all five East Indiamen into service. Hillsborough became the 34-gun frigate Santa Balbina. In 1794 she was sold for breaking up.
