= Action of 9 August 1780 =

Naval battle of the American Revolutionary War

- Part of the Anglo-French War (1778–1783)
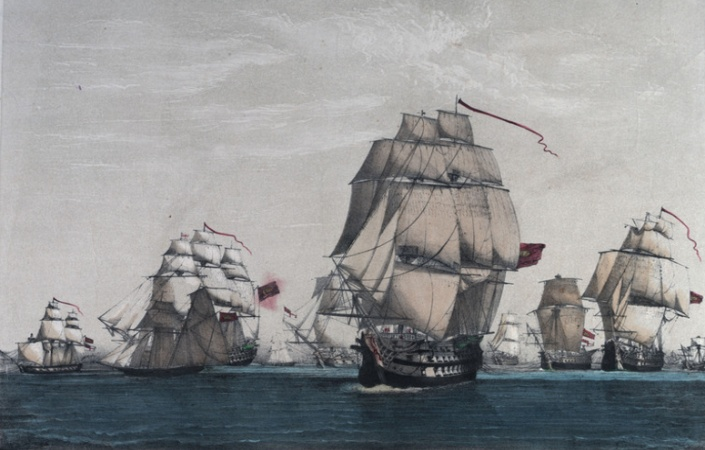
- The British convoy of 63 merchant ships with all but 8 ships captured by the fleet under Luis de Cordova, Unknown author
Date	9 August 1780
Location	Off Cape St. Vincent, Atlantic Ocean 35°50′1″N 13°14′0″W
Result	Franco-Spanish victory

Belligerents
Spain; France	Great Britain

Commanders and leaders
Luis Córdova; Jose Mazarredo; Antoine Hilarion de Beausset	John Moutray

Strength
32 ships of the line 6 frigates	1 ship of the line 2 frigates 63 merchant vessels

Casualties and losses
None	3,144 prisoners 55 merchant vessels captured

The action of 9 August 1780 was a naval engagement during the American Revolutionary War and a part of the Anglo-French War (1778–1783) in which a Spanish fleet and French fleet, led by Admiral Luis de Córdova y Córdova, encountered a large British convoy. The Franco-Spanish force captured almost all the merchant vessels in the convoy, which dealt a severe blow to the commerce of Great Britain.

The British convoy, escorted by HMS Ramillies (74 guns, under Captain Sir John Moutray) and two frigates - Thetis (36 guns) and Southampton (36 guns), sailed from Portsmouth on 27 July. On 9 August, they encountered the Spanish fleet.

The Franco-Spanish fleet captured 55 of the 63 merchant vessels present, making it one of the most complete naval captures ever made. The losses, were, in total 80,000 muskets, equipment for 40,000 troops, 294 cannons, and 3,144 men. The financial impact of the losses were estimated to be around £1,500,000 (£1,000,000 in gold and silver and £500,000 in equipment and ships). The action also helped to derail a secret British diplomatic effort to make peace with Spain.

Putting the scale of the capture into modern perspective, £100 in 1780 is equivalent to £22,937.72 in 2025. An equivalent value of £342,565,800 in 2025.

== Background ==
Discontent with colonial rule in the Thirteen Colonies began shortly after the defeat of France in the French and Indian War in 1763. On July 4, 1776, the Second Continental Congress adopted the Declaration of Independence. From 1778, France and Britain fought over dominance in the English Channel, the Mediterranean, the Indian Ocean and the Caribbean. Spain was allied with France through the Bourbon Family Compact. The kingdoms of France and Spain entered the American Revolutionary War as allies of the Thirteen Colonies. Action of 17 August 1779 under the command of the French admiral Louis Guillouet, Count of Orvilliers, and the Spaniard Luis de Córdova, sowed panic on the British coasts after fleeing the squad of the Channel and apprehending the ship HMS Ardent, leaving the coast free for the Spanish-French invasion of Great Britain.

The British convoy sailed from Portsmouth, and consisted of 63 merchant vessels. The convoy included East Indiamen, West Indiamen, 18 victuallers, military storeships, and transports carrying the 90th Regiment of Foot. The troops were intended for service in the West Indies, and they had tents and camp equipment with them. Besides arms, ammunition, and a train of artillery, the five East India vessels carried a large quantity of naval-stores to supply the British squadron in India in support of the wars against the Maratha Confederacy, Hyder Ali and the French East India Company.

On the morning of 2 August, the convoy fell in with the Channel Fleet. The Channel Fleet accompanied the convoy for several hours, to a point 112 leagues off the Isles of Scilly, where the two groups of ships parted company.

== Intelligence about the convoy ==
Spanish intelligence agents stationed in London managed to find out the date of departure of the convoy and the possible route to follow before splitting, immediately reported to Don Jose Moñino, count of Floridablanca, Floridablanca also received information from the Captain General of Cuba that a strong squad of merchant and war British ships was going to sail from England with reinforcement troops, war material, food and ammunition for Rodney and the forces fighting in the American revolutionary War. This information had been collected by the network of secret agents created by Juan de Miralles and based in Philadelphia.

== Interception ==
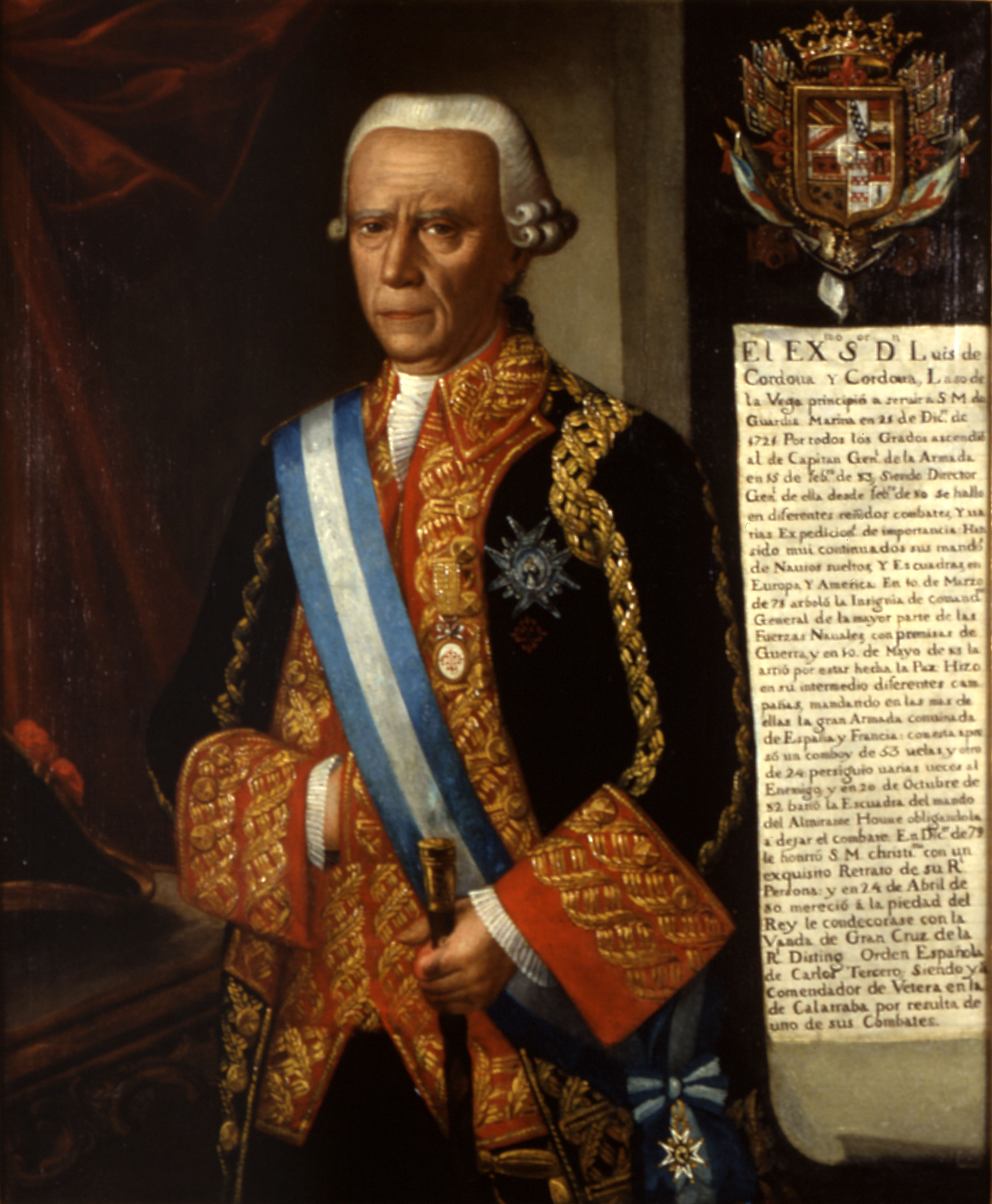
Luis de Córdova

Following the instructions given to Luis de Córdova by Don Jose Moñino, count of Floridablanca, the Spanish fleet set sail from Cádiz and sailed as far as Madeira and the Canary Islands, where Don Luís deployed several frigates to spot the convoy. One of these frigates intercepted the convoy on the night of 8 August.

The news was greeted with caution, because there was doubt as to whether the ships were the Channel Fleet or the British convoy. The deputy Spanish commander, José de Mazarredo, called for an immediate attack. He concluded that there was no reason for the British fleet to be sailing so far from the Channel, and argued that all the suspected ships had to be a convoy under escort.

When strange sails (those of the Franco-Spanish fleet) were spotted, Captain Moutray signalled his ships to alter course and follow him close to the wind. The two frigates (Thetis and Southampton) and eight of the convoy followed the Ramillies and so escaped, but the rest of the British convoy mistook the lanterns at mast head of the Santísima Trinidad for those of their own commander, and fooled by a ruse of war, they steered accordingly. At daybreak, they found themselves intermingled with the Spanish fleet. Admiral Córdova enveloped them, and hoisted signals to launch a general chase.

Córdova's fleet captured 50 West Indiamen, including those chartered by the crown, and the five East Indiamen, Gatton, Godfrey, Hillsborough, Mountstuart and Royal George, totaling to 55 captured ships. The British loss was the worst disaster in the history of the East India Company. The 120-gun ship of the line Santísima Trinidad, the flagship of Admiral de Córdova, fired on Mountstuart and Godfrey to induce them to strike. Gatton was also attacked by the Purísima Concepción and set on fire, but the fire was later brought under control, and the ship was seized. A frigate flotilla, commanded by Santiago de Liniers, and part of the Concepción squadron, captured the 30-gun East Indiaman Hillsborough.

This was a major intelligence failure, for the British Admiralty did not learn of the presence of an enemy fleet at sea until 4 August, and neither did Geary nor Captain John Moutray.

== Aftermath ==
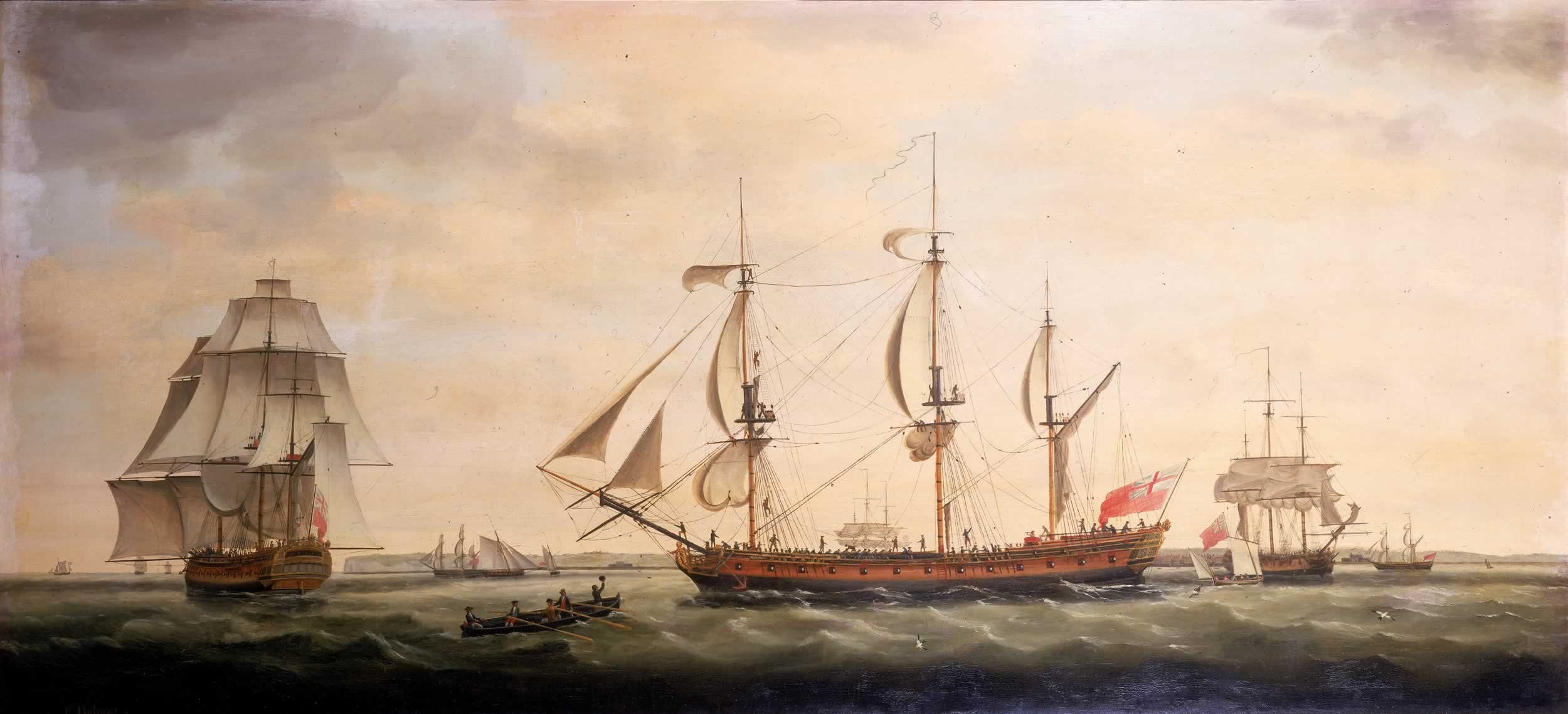
The Indiaman Royal George in Three Positions in the Downs by Francis Holman, 1779. Royal George was one of the five East Indiamen the Franco-Spanish fleet captured.

The captured British ships were brought to Cádiz, which was an unusual spectacle since the capture of such a great enemy convoy by any navy was an uncommon event; de Córdova's fleet did this on two occasions. All the ships, including the five East Indiamen, were incorporated into the Spanish merchant fleet.

The Spaniards behaved with humanity to their prisoners, repaying the treatment which their countrymen had been given by Admiral Rodney.

We received fourteen shot from one of the seventy-four's had two men killed and six wounded, our bowspirit shot and shivered up as far as the gammoning, when we struck to the Ferme, a 74. (The Spanish Firme) We were all, except the ladies and their husbands, the captains, first and second officers, and about six other gentlemen, ordered on board the Ferme: but on going on board, had it in our option to return; which we all did; and we met with the greatest civility, humanity, and generosity on board [...] The great kindness of the Spaniards makes our situation scarcely felt, as everything is done by them to alleviate our misfortune; and we have never yet felt that we were prisoners

— Officer of East Indiaman Hillsborough, Cádiz, August 25, 1780.

The five British East Indiaman were brought into Spanish service. The Spanish navy commissioned the 30-gun Hillsborough as the 12-gun store-ship Santa Clotilde, the 28-gun Mountstuart as the 34-gun Santa Balvina, the 28-gun Royal George as the 40-gun Real Jorge, the 28-gun Godfrey as the 34-gun Santa Biviana and the 28-gun Gatton as the 34-gun Santa Paula.

Among the British merchantmen who managed to escape were British Queen and Fanny, whose copper sheathing helped distance their pursuers.

This Spanish victory, compounded by the serious storm losses in the Caribbean, produced a financial crisis among marine insurance underwriters throughout Europe. Many went bankrupt, and war insurance rates, already remarkably high due to the presence of privateers, were driven to intolerable levels. It also increased and made increasingly public the dissatisfaction which prevailed against the ministry, and against the conduct and government of the Royal Navy. King George III fainted when he received the news, in addition to the loss to the state coffers, the king had just lost a significant sum of his own wealth that, advised by his secretary, had been invested in the London Stock Exchange. Insurance company Lloyd's, one of his investments, suffered great losses having to face redemption of policies worth more than half its assets and lost 60 per cent of its market capitalization.

Public discontent in Great Britain also increased against the British prime minister Frederick North; who was also Chancellor of the Exchequer as well as the Royal Navy leadership. North was the second British Prime Minister to be forced out of office by a motion of no confidence. This successful interception by enemies showed that the English fleet, dispersed in too many theaters of operations, had lost control of the Atlantic routes in 1780. This led to the Franco-American victory in Yorktown campaign and Franco-Spanish victory in Invasion of Minorca. The Franco-American victory in Yorktown campaign led to the surrender of the British Army force of General Charles Earl Cornwallis, an event that led directly to the beginning of serious peace negotiations and the eventual independence of the United States of America from Great Britain.
