= Royal George (1777 ship) =

Three-decker East Indiaman

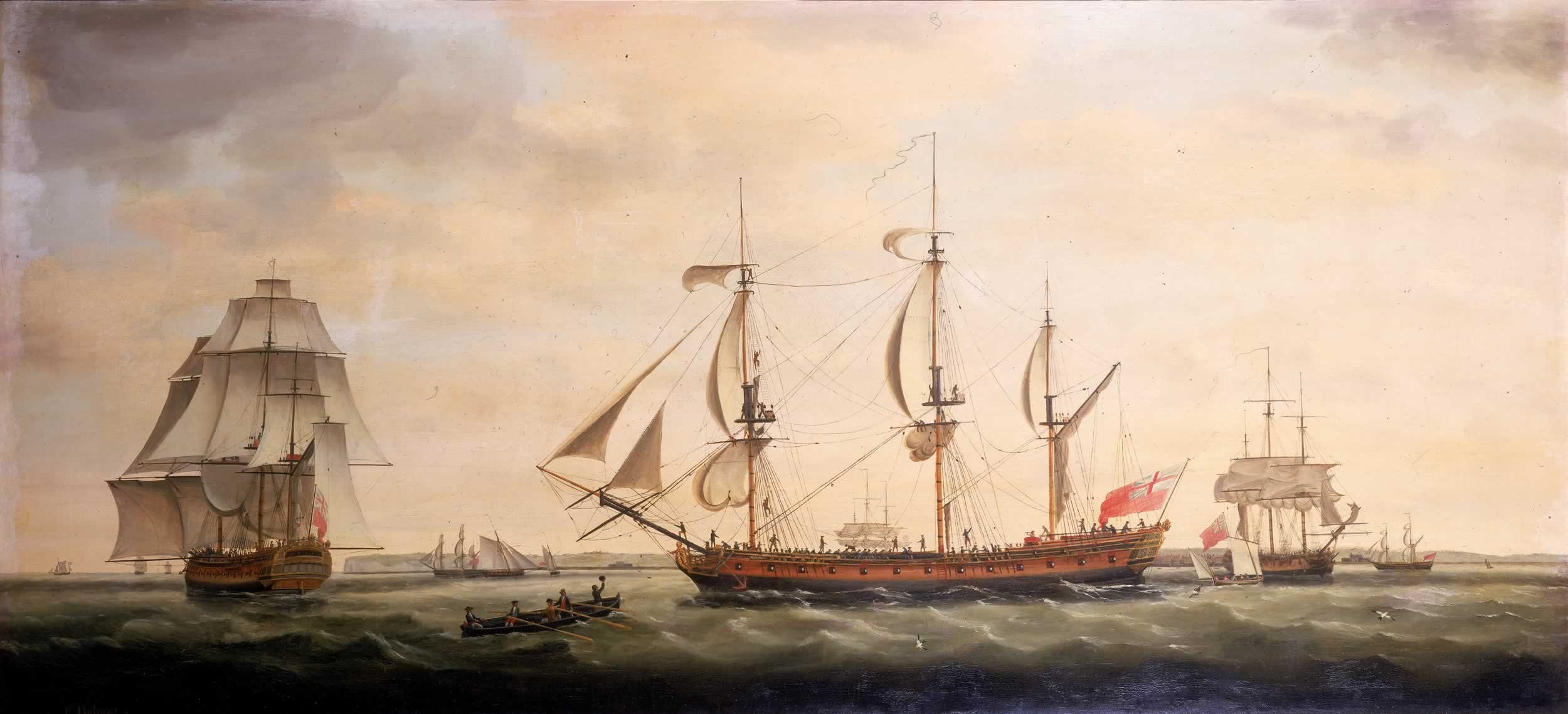
- The Indiaman Royal George in Three Positions in the Downs, by Francis Holman, 1779.

History

United Kingdom
- Name: Royal George
- Owner: East India Company
- Builder: Randall, Gray & Brent, Rotherhithe
- Launched: 17 October 1777, or 18 October
- Captured: 1780

Kingdom of Spain
- Name: Real Jorge
- Out of service: 1784
- Captured: 1780
- Fate: Broken up

General characteristics
- Tons burthen: 758, (bm)
- Armament: Indiaman: 28 or 30 guns; Spanish Navy: 40 guns

Royal George was a three-decker East Indiaman launched in 1777. She made one voyage to Madras and China for the British East India Company. Her voyage took place during the American War of Independence, and she had just set out on her second voyage when a Spanish fleet captured her on 9 August 1780, together with almost the entire convoy of which she was a member. The Spanish Navy took her into service as Real Jorge, a frigate of 40 guns. She was out of service by 1784, and broken up thereafter.

== Voyage #1 (1778–1780) ==
Captain Thomas Foxall left Portsmouth on 2 February 1778, bound for Madras and China. Royal George reached Johanna on 25 May, and Madras on 29 June. She reached Malacca on 26 August, and arrived at Whampoa on 2 October. On her return voyage she crossed the Second Bar, about 20 miles before Whampoa, on 20 February 1779. She reached St Helena on 24 September, and the Downs on 13 January 1780.

== Voyage #2 (1780–capture) ==
For Foxall's second voyage as captain of Royal George, his first officer was Nathaniel Dance, who would go on to distinguish himself in 1803 at the Battle of Pulo Aura. Royal George left Portsmouth on 27 July 1780, as part of an enormous convoy of 63 merchantmen, including four more East Indiamen, Gatton, Godfrey, Mountstuart, and Hillsborough. Royal George was bound for Madras and Bengal, though the other vessels had diverse destinations, almost all being bound to the West Indies. The entire convoy was under the escort of HMS Ramillies, under the command of Sir John Moutray, and three frigates, including the 36-gun frigates HMS Thetis and HMS Southampton.

On 8 August 1780 unusual sails were seen, and Moutray signalled to his ships to alter course and follow him close to the wind. They paid no attention to his orders. Unfortunately for the British convoy, the strange sails were a Spanish naval fleet, under the command of Admiral Luis de Córdova y Córdova, together with a squadron of French ships. The British convoy and their Spanish and French forces met at 36°28′N 15°20′W.

The British warships escaped with eight of the convoy. The enemy captured the other 55 merchantmen. including the five East Indiamen, and their cargoes worth £1.5 million, and 3,144 prisoners. It was a blow to British commerce, and especially to the forces in the West Indies, which lost a vast quantity of military stores.

== Spanish Navy service and fate ==
The Spaniards took their prizes into Cádiz. Spanish records reported that Royal George was carrying a crew of 122 men, 17 troops, five women, and 10 other passengers.

The Spaniards offered the East Indian Company the opportunity to buy back Royal George, but the Company refused.

The Spanish Navy took all five East Indiamen into service. Royal George became the 40-gun frigate Real Jorge. She was out of service by 1784 and sold for breaking up at some point thereafter.
