= Mary Moutray =

Scottish Jacobite supporter (1675-1729)

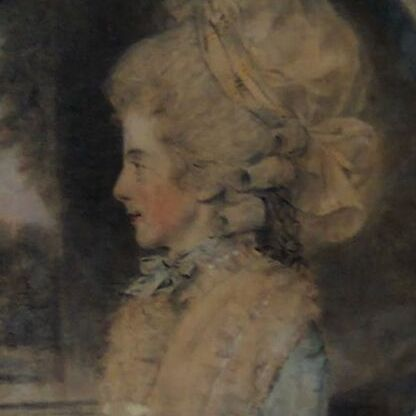
- Born: Yorktown
- Baptised: 1752
- Died: 1844; County Meath
- Spouse(s): John Moutray
- Children: Katherine Moutray, John Moutray

Mary Moutray born Mary Pemble (bap. 1752 – 1844) was a naval wife of John Moutray who was the Royal Commissioner in Antigua. Horatio Nelson was besotted with her and Cuthbert Collingwood was another friend and admirer.

== Life ==
Moutray was baptised in Yorktown, Virginia in 1752. Her parents were Catherine Selby and Lieutenant John Pemble of HMS Tryton.

She married on 2 September 1771 to a naval officer, John Moutray at Berwick upon Tweed. Her husband was thirty years older than her. She and John had twins in 1773 that they called Catherine and John.

In the 1780s they were in Antigua where her husband was the Royal Commissioner. one of the captains there was Horatio Nelson who hated this particular posting. The only thing in his mind that made it bearable was the presence of Mary Moutray. Mary and her husband were only there for a few months in 1784 but she made a lasting impression on Nelson. He first met her in June 1784 and the friendship developed despite Nelson reporting her husband for a breach of procedure. Nelson said that he cried when he first thought of Antigua without her. He said that her company was where he had "spent more happy hours than anywhere else". When Nelson did start to court a wife he would tell, Frances Nisbet, about Mrs Moutray. Mary wrote about Nelson noting that he took to wearing a wig because he had lost hair dues to a fever. Cuthbert Collingwood kept a sketch of him in that wig.

After John Moutray died Mary petitioned for a pension and although she gained Royal support the request was denied by Lord Howe on the grounds that it might create a precedent for other claims. Some commentators have supposed that if John Moutray had died in Antigua then Nelson would have married Mary. Nelson took an interest in Mary's son John. He was with Nelson at the Siege of Calvi. When John died during the siege Nelson paid for his memorial.

When Nelson died in 1805 then Cuthbert Collingwood wrote to her. He too had been captivated by her when he was in Antigua and he had written poetry about her.

John and Mary's daughter Katherine (a.k.a. Kate) married the Thomas de Lacy who was a long-serving archdeacon of Meath in 1806. Mary died in Meath in 1844.
