= Spanish ship Purísima Concepción =

Ship of the line of the Spanish Navy (1779–1810)

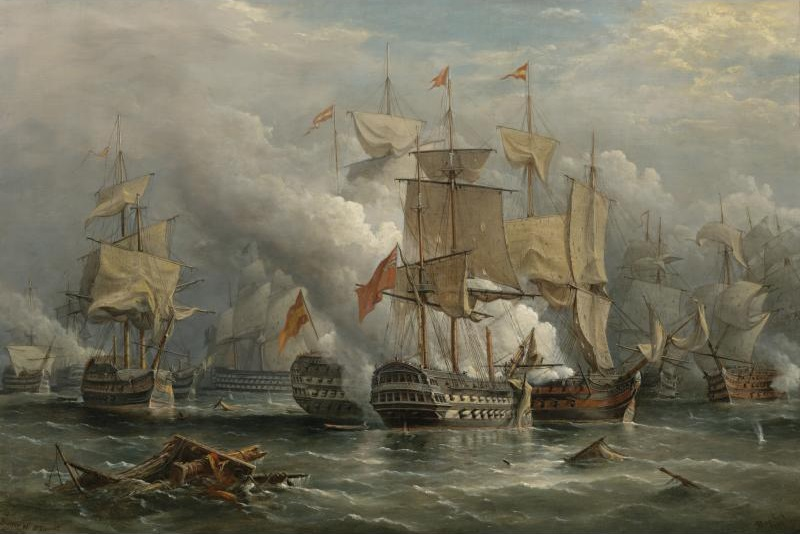
- A painting depicting the Second Battle of Cape St Vincent in which Purísima Concepción took part

History

Spanish Empire
- Name: La Purísima Concepción
- Namesake: Immaculate Conception
- Builder: Real Astillero de Esteiro, Ferrol (Francisco Gautier)
- Laid down: 29 February 1779
- Launched: 24 December 1779
- Completed: 1780
- Commissioned: 1780
- Out of service: 9 August 1810
- Refit: 1780, 1784, 1806
- Stricken: 1810
- Fate: Sunk on 9 August 1810 by French forces off Cádiz.

General characteristics
- Class & type: First-rate ship of the line
- Tons burthen: 2,771 bm
- Length: 213 Burgos Feet (Gundeck) (as completed); 220 Burgos Feet 6 Burgos inches (Gundeck) (as rebuilt 1796); 186 Burgos Feet 0 Burgos inches (Keel)
- Beam: 58 Burgos Feet 4 Burgos inches
- Depth of hold: 28 Burgos Feet 9 Burgos inches
- Decks: 3
- Propulsion: Sail
- Capacity: 800 - 1,000 men
- Troops: 446 Infantry + 3 Infantry Officers, 91 Artillerymen, 127 Marines + 6 Marine Guards + 16 Marine Officers + 16 General Officers (In 1800, Brest)
- Complement: 34 Pajes + 109 Grumetes + 202 Naval Artillerymen + 48 Naval Officers (In 1800, Brest)
- Armament: 112-120 guns - 32 36 pounders, 30 24 pounders, 32 12 pounders and 18 8 pounders

Purísima Concepción was a ship of the line of Spanish Navy. Commissioned in 1780, she served in the American Revolutionary War and French Revolutionary and Napoleonic Wars before being destroyed by French forces in 1810.

== Commission and construction ==
The name Purísima Concepción translates into English directly as Immaculate Conception, a religious reference to the veneration of the Virgin Mary. The names of contemporary Spanish ships commonly had religious undertones as with general Spanish naming traditions of the period.

Purísima Concepción was laid down on 29 February 1779 at the Royal Dockyards at Ferrol, Province of A Coruña, Galicia. She was designed by Spanish naval architect Francisco Gautier and constructed by José Joaquín Romero Fernández de Landa. She was launched on 24 December 1779 and commissioned into the Spanish Navy in 1780. She was completed and commissioned in 1780.

== Service ==
Purísima Concepción was recorded as having been at Cádiz in 1780, her first action involved attachment to the 3rd Franco-Spanish fleet for the Campaign of the English Channel.

On 9 August 1780, Purísima Concepción was part of the Spanish fleet that captured a British convoy of 52 ships under the command of Admiral Luis de Córdova y Córdova and Vice Admiral Jose de Mazarredo y Salazar.

On 5 October 1781, Purísima Concepción was anchored at Cádiz.

In 1782, Purísima Concepción supported Spanish actions at Gibraltar during the Great Siege of Gibraltar and was back at Cádiz on 15 April 1782.

On 22 October 1782, Purísima Concepción was one of 38 ships of the line of the Spanish fleet at the Battle of Cape Spartel though she did not see any action that day.

In 1784, Purísima Concepción was sailed from Cádiz to Cartagena where she was ordered set in commission. On 13 August 1784, she left Cartagena in a patrol squadron together with the sixth-rate, 24 gun frigate Santa Gertrudis returning to Cádiz. The following day, 14 August, Purisima Concepción assisted Santa Gertrudis in the capture of a 14-gun Algerian vessel. The action lasted around a half-hour beginning when Purísima Concepción opened fire on the Algerian ship at around 10 o'clock in the morning. The Algerian vessel was boarded around a half-hour later resulting in the smaller vessel's capitulation. The Algerian vessel had four heavy cannons, two deck-mounted guns and eight swivel guns. On 15 August, Purísima Concepción arrived in Cádiz together with the Gertrudis and their Algerian prize vessel.

In early February 1793, Purísima Concepción arrived at Cartagena for commissioning and soon after returned to Cádiz. On 23 February 1793, she sailed from Cádiz with 6 other ships of the line to Cartagena where they would join the Siege of Toulon. On 2 October 1793, the fleet left Cartagena bound for Toulon, arriving in the theater on 21 October to join the combined British-Spanish fleet. After the victory at Toulon on 19 December, Purísima Concepción left on 25 December bound for Cartagena, arriving on 31 December 1793.

On 3 March 1795, Purísima Concepción was at Cádiz.

On 26 June 1796, Purísima Concepción was at Cartagena. While docked, a fire broke out on the ship but it was extinguished by the crew before causing significant damage.

In 1797, Purísima Concepción was at Cádiz and was trapped there by the British blockade of the port. Spain eventually prevailed in the battle. On 14 February 1797, she took part in the Second Battle of Cape St Vincent. She was the flagship for the second Spanish squadron. Her commander was Lieutenant-General Francisco Javier Morales de los Ríos and her Flag Captain & Brigadier was José Escaño. The Spanish fleet was commanded by Admiral José de Córdoba y Ramos. During the action, she suffered 8 killed and 21 wounded. The Spanish defeat at Cape St. Vincent enabled the British Royal Navy under Admiral Horatio Nelson back into the Mediterranean Sea.

In 1800, Purísima Concepción was attached to the Spanish fleet in the Second Campaign of the English Channel. Later in the year she was blockaded by the British Fleet under Rear Admiral John Colpoys at Brest. She remained blockaded at Brest until 1801.

In 1808, Purísima Concepción was careened at Ferrol and sailed from Ferrol to Cádiz later in the year when the process was complete.

In 1809, Purísima Concepción was at Cádiz.

In 1810, Purísima Concepción was at Cádiz. On 6 March, a big storm swept the harbor at Cádiz. On 7 March, Purísima Concepción lost her anchors and ran ashore on the French-occupied Spanish coast. On 8 August 1810, Purísima Concepción was under heavy shot from French warships and land forces. On 9 August, she was burned by French troops and sunk off the coast. At the time of the loss, the ship was under the command of Rafael Mastre. Two other Spanish line ships, Montañés and San Ramón, the Spanish frigate Paz, a Portuguese warship, a British brigantine and 20 merchant ships were similarly lost as a result of the storm and subsequent French attacks.

== Commanders ==
Commanders of the Purísima Concepción
Commander	Commanded From	Commanded Until	Notes
Captain Don Antonio de Osorno y Funes	1782	?	N/A
Captain Don Juan Landecho	13 August 1784	?	N/A
Commodore Don Pedro de Cárdenas	1786	?	N/A
Commodore Don Francisco Santiesteban	2 October 1793	?	N/A
Commodore Don Luis de Villabriga y Rozas	1794	1796	N/A
Commodore Don Jose Escaño	1797	?	N/A
Captain Don Francisco Javier de Uriarte y Borja	1800	?	N/A
Captain Don Rafael Maestre	1808	9 March 1810	N/A

Flag Officers of the Purísima Concepción
Commander	Commanded From	Commanded Until	Notes
Vice Admiral Don Miguel Gascón	1780	?	Purísima Concepción served as flagship
Admiral Don Luis de Cordova	5 October 1781	15 April 1782	Purísima Concepción served as flagship
Admiral Don Juan Bautista Bonet	1782	?	N/A
Admiral Don Juan de Langara y Huarte	23 February 1793	1 March 1793	N/A
Admiral Don Juan de Langara y Huarte	21 October 1793	?	N/A
Admiral Don Francisco de Borja	1794	?	N/A
Admiral Don Jose de Mazarredo	3 March 1795	?	N/A
Vice Admiral Francisco Morales de los Ríos y Pineda, Count of Morales de los Ríos	1797	?	Purísima Concepción served as flagship

== Bibliography ==
- Winfield, Rif; Tredrea, John M; García-Torralba Pérez, Enrique & Blasco Felip, Manuel (2023). Spanish Warships in the Age of Sail 1700—1860: Design, Construction, Careers and Fates. Seaforth Publishing. ISBN 978-1-5267-9078-1.
