= Battle of Le Havre =

Battle of Le Havre may refer to:

- Raid on Le Havre in July 1759 during the Seven Years' War
- Operation Astonia in September 1944 during the Second World War
