= Action of 15 February 1783 =

- Part of the American Revolutionary War and the Anglo-French War (1778–1783)
Date	15 February 1783
Location	off Guadeloupe, Caribbean Sea
Result	British victory

Belligerents
Great Britain	France

Commanders and leaders
Robert Linzee	Chevalier Clesmaur

Strength
1 ship of the line	1 frigate

Casualties and losses
Minor	300 killed or wounded 1 frigate captured

The action of 15 February 1783 was a small naval engagement of the American Revolutionary War, involving the 36-gun French Navy frigate Concorde and the Royal Navy 74-gun ship of the line Magnificent. The British were victorious when Concorde was overhauled and captured.

== Course of battle ==
Captain Charles Inglis was given command of a squadron of four ships cruising independently in the West Indies. The squadron, consisting of HMS St Albans, the 64-gun HMS Prudent, the 74-gun HMS Magnificent under Captain Robert Linzee and the sloop HMS Barbados, had arrived in St. Lucia. They were to eventually help blockade Cap-François off Saint-Domingue with the help of ships of the line from the Jamaica station. On 12 February reports arrived of a French squadron, consisting of Triton, Amphion and several frigates, having sailed from Martinique, and so the squadron was sent to investigate.

Magnificent sailed from Gros Islet Bay in Bay on 12 February 1783 in company with Prudent and St Albans. Three days later, a French frigate was sighted just past Guadeloupe island by Magnificent. The frigate was the Concorde carrying 36 guns and 300 men, and was under the command of Chevalier du Clesmaur. Magnificent gave chase and by 20:00 as darkness fell, Concorde opened fire on her pursuer with her stern guns. Magnificent however overhauled the French ship by 21:15, and after fifteen minutes of fighting that included a devastating broadside, forced her to strike her colours. Magnificent then took possession of Concorde.

== Aftermath ==
Shortly after surrendering, Concorde's maintopsail caught fire, forcing the crew to cut away the mainmast to extinguish it. Prudent and St Albans arrived two hours later and Magnificent towed Concorde to St. John's, Antigua. Concorde served in the Royal Navy as HMS Concorde until being broken up in 1811.

== Notes & References ==
- McGrigor, Mary (2003). Defiant and Dismasted at Trafalgar: The Life & Times of Admiral Sir William Hargood. Leo Cooper Ltd. ISBN 978-1844150342.
