= Action of 12 December 1779 =

1779 naval battle

- Part of the American Revolutionary War
Date	12 December 1779
Location	off Punta Sal, present day Bay of Honduras
Result	British victory

Belligerents
Great Britain	Spain

Commanders and leaders
(Kingdom of Great Britain) Charles Inglis	(Spain) Juan Antonio Zavelleta

Strength
1 ship of the line (HMS Salisbury)	1 ship of the line (San Carlos)

Casualties and losses
9 killed 9 wounded	1 ship of the line captured 60 killed or wounded 337 captured

The action of 12 December 1779 was a minor naval engagement that took place in the Bay of Honduras during the American Revolutionary War between a British Royal naval Fourth-rate fifty gun ship and a fifty gun Spanish privateer.

The 50-gun HMS Salisbury had sailed for Jamaica in January 1779 under the command of Charles Inglis. On 12 December she was sailing in the Bay of Honduras off the coast of the Punta Sal when at daybreak a large ship was sighted ahead. Inglis gave chase, a pursuit which lasted all day until Salisbury came in range at 6.30 pm The fleeing ship hoisted Spanish colours and an action began, which lasted until 8.30 pm when the Spanish ship had her mainmast shot away. Having sustained heavy casualties and suffered considerable damage, she struck her colours. She was found to be the 50-gun privateer San Carlos under Don Juan Antonio Zavelleta, carrying stores; mainly 5,000 stand of arms heading from Cádiz to Fort Omoa, which had recently been captured and then abandoned by British forces.

In the battle the San Carlos had a complement of 397 men with 60 men killed or wounded and the rest being captured. Four men were killed on Salisbury and fourteen wounded of which five were mortal. Inglis then sailed to Jamaica carrying the San Carlos in and then distributed the prize money before heading to North America by the summer of 1780.
