= HMS Actif =

Sloop of the Royal Navy

History

Great Britain
- Name: Active
- Launched: c.1789
- Captured: 21 May 1793

France
- Name: Actif
- Acquired: 21 May 1793 by capture
- Captured: 16 March 1794

Great Britain
- Name: HMS Actif
- Acquired: By capture 1794
- Fate: Foundered 1794

General characteristics
- Type: sloop
- Displacement: c.150 tons (French)
- Tons burthen: 165, or 100 (bm)
- Complement: British privateer:40; Royal Navy service:60
- Armament: British privateer:12 × 4-pounder guns + 4 × swivel guns; French privateer: 6 to 16 guns; Royal Navy service:10 × 4-pounder guns

HMS Actif was supposedly the British privateer Active that the French captured in 1793 and that became the French privateer Actif. Iphigenia recaptured Actif on 16 March 1794. The Royal Navy took her into service but she foundered on 26 November. All her crew were saved.

== British privateer ==
British sources state that Active was a Liverpool privateer launched c. 1789. She was under the command of Captain Stephen Bower (or Bowers), and was sailing under a letter of marque dated 2 May 1793. The French frigate Sémillante captured this privateer on 21 May 1793. At capture, Active was armed with eleven guns and three howitzers.

There are problems with this story. Bowers's letter of marque describes Active as a brig of 100 tons (bm), not a sloop of 165. More critically, both Williams's account of the capture, and that in Lloyd's List report that a Guernsey privateer recaptured Active and took her into Guernsey. Lloyd's List further named the re-captor as the privateer Brilliant.

== French service ==
On 16 March 1794 Iphigenia captured both Actif and Espiegle in the West Indies.

== Royal Navy service and loss ==
The Royal Navy registered Actif as a sloop on 17 July. However, already by 4 June she was on active service with the Royal Navy, participating in the capture of Port-au-Prince. Commander John Harvey became her captain on 5 September.

Harvey was sailing Actif to England when by 24 November she developed leaks while off Bermuda. Even with the crew working the pumps continuously, she took on so much water as her structure weakened that on the 26th she had to make distress signals. HMS St Albans came up and rescued Harvey and his crew. The rescuers left her to founder at 30°9′N 76°58′W.
