= HMS St Albans (1764) =

Ship of the line of the Royal Navy

- St Albans

History

Great Britain
- Name: HMS St Albans
- Ordered: 13 January 1761
- Builder: Perry, Blackwall Yard
- Launched: 12 September 1764
- Fate: Broken up, 1814
- Notes: Floating battery from 1813

General characteristics
- Class & type: St Albans-class ship of the line
- Tons burthen: 1380 (bm)
- Length: 159 ft (48 m) (gundeck)
- Beam: 44 ft 4 in (13.51 m)
- Depth of hold: 18 ft 10 in (5.74 m)
- Propulsion: Sails
- Sail plan: Full-rigged ship
- Armament: 64 guns: Gundeck: 26 × 24-pounders; Upper gundeck: 26 × 18-pounders; QD: 10 × 4-pounders; Fc: 2 × 9-pounders

HMS St Albans was a 64-gun third rate ship of the line of the Royal Navy, launched on 12 September 1764 by Perry, Wells & Green at their Blackwall Yard, London.

She sailed with a complement of 525 men and 64 guns with a draught of 1,380 tons and a gun deck of 159 ft 6ins x 42 ft. This type of ship was the second biggest class of ships-of-the-line on the navy list with 39 ships in 1793, and 41 in 1812. The 64 was essentially a cut price 74-gun ship; it had neither the gun power nor the sailing qualities of the latter. but more could be produced for the money. It was not a popular class with naval officers.

She served in the American War of Independence from 1777 and was part of the fleet that captured St Lucia and won victories at Battle of St. Kitts and The Saintes. She was converted to a floating battery in 1813 and was broken up in 1814.

== Career ==
Captain Richard Onslow took command of St Albans on 31 October 1776. He took a convoy to New York City in April 1777 and joined Lord Howe in time for the repulse of d'Estaing on 22 July 1777 at Sandy Hook. She captured two prizes in December, 1777. On 30 January 1778 she and HMS Otter in Chesapeake Bay recaptured the Fortune that had previously been captured by a French privateer. On 4 February her boats captured and burned a schooner in the James River. On 14 February her boats captured and burned the Virginia State Government owned trading sloop Shore, and the sloop Defiance off Hampton Creek, Virginia. She captured two more prizes in March, the French Jean Andre on 12 March by her tender, plus another. On 21 March her tender, H. M. schooner Dasher, captured the sloop Holt and the schooner Hawke in the area of Hampton Roads, Virginia. Hawke was broken up for firewood on 5 April and Holt on 6 April. Another prize was captured by her tender in April, 1778. Onslow sailed for the West Indies on 4 November 1778 with Commodore Hotham, and took part in the capture of Saint Lucia and its defence against d'Estaing that December at the Cul-de-Sac. In August 1779, he brought a convoy from St Kitts to Spithead.

On 10 December 1780, St Albans, in company with Vestal, Monsieur, Portland and Solebay captured the Comtess de Buzancois.

Captain Charles Inglis took command of St Albans in November 1780. On 13 March 1781 he sailed in with Vice-Admiral George Darby's fleet to the relief of Gibraltar. He was with Admiral Robert Digby's squadron later that year, before being sent to the Leeward Islands to join Sir Samuel Hood at Barbados.

St Albans was with Hood during the Battle of Saint Kitts, when Hood attempted to relieve the island and repulsed several attacks by the Comte de Grasse on 25 and 26 January 1782. Inglis was again in action with the French on 9 April, when Hood's fleet clashed with de Grasse's in the Dominica Channel, and fought at the Battle of the Saintes on 12 April, where the main British fleet under Inglis's old captain, now Admiral Sir George Rodney, decisively defeated de Grasse. St Albans had six men wounded during this engagement.

St Albans sailed to North America in late July 1782 with Rodney's successor, Admiral Hugh Pigot. She was back in the West Indies by November, where Inglis was given command of a squadron of four ships cruising independently there. The squadron, consisting of St Albans, the 64-gun Prudent, the 74-gun Magnificent and the sloop Barbados, was sent from Gros Islet Bay on 12 February to investigate reports of a French squadron, consisting of Triton, Amphion and several frigates, having sailed from Martinique.

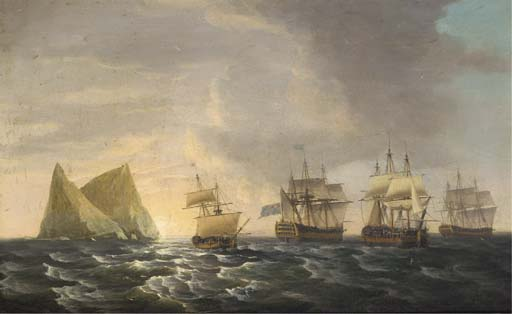
Admiral Pigot's return from the West Indies on board HMS Formidable in the company of other Royal Naval warships including St. Albans and HM brig Swift, Dominic Serres

On 15 February 1783 the 74-gun Magnificent, under Captain Robert Linzee. was on a cruise in company with Prudent and St Albans. Magnificent sighted a strange sail and gave chase. She was close enough to identify the mysterious ship as a frigate by 18:00, and by 20:00 as darkness fell the quarry opened fire on her pursuer with her stern guns. Magnificent overhauled the French ship by 21:15, and after fifteen minutes forced her to strike her colours. Magnificent took possession of Concorde, of 36 guns and 300 men under the command of M. le Chevalier du Clesmaur. Shortly after surrendering, Concorde's maintopsail caught fire, forcing the crew to cut away the mainmast to extinguish it. Prudent and St Albans came up two hours later and Magnificent towed Concorde to St. John's, Antigua.

On 26 November 1794 she rescued the crew of HMS Actif which had developed leaks and was foundering.

St Albans and Porcupine shared in the capture on 8 November of the brig Molly.

St Albans was recommissioned under the command of Captain Francis Austen in February 1807. The ship sailed to serve in the East Indies and off China on 5 April 1809. By October 1810 Captain Edward Brace had assumed command and St Albans was serving off the coast of Cádiz.

From December 1810 she was at Spithead then on Cádiz station until December 1812 under Brace and captains Charles Grant & John Devonshire.

She was taken out of commission and docked in Chatham for refit December 1812 - October 1813

== Fate ==
By September 1813, St Albans was converted to be used as a floating battery. She was broken up in June 1814.
