= Planned French invasion of Britain (1759) =

Part of the Seven Years' War and Jacobite Risings

- Part of the Seven Years' War
- The Battle of Quiberon Bay, which ended the planned invasion
- Location: France, English Channel
- Planned by: Duke of Choiseul
- Commanded by: Duke of Aiguillon; Charles, Prince of Soubise; Hubert de Brienne
- Objective: Invade and occupy Britain
- Date: 1759
- Executed by: France
- Outcome: Called off

In 1759, France planned to invade Great Britain during the Seven Years' War. 100,000 French soldiers were to land in Britain to end British involvement in the war. Due to various factors, including naval defeats at the Battle of Lagos and the Battle of Quiberon Bay, the invasion was never launched. This was one of several failed French attempts during the 18th century to invade Britain.

== Background ==
The War of the Austrian Succession ended in 1748 with the Peace of Aachen. All of its signatories considered it unsatisfactory; in France "as stupid as the peace" became a catch phrase. Frustrated by the loss of Silesia to the Kingdom of Prussia, Maria Theresa of Austria looked for an alliance which would enable her to recover it. This led Austria to an historic rapprochement with France. France was prepared to ally with her historic enemy because this would, the Conseil du Roi thought, allow her to concentrate her efforts against Great Britain in a future war. In reaction, Prussia, which had emerged from the war as a newly significant European power, allied with her previous enemy, Great Britain. By 1755 Britain and France were fighting an undeclared war at sea and on the Indian frontier of North America; for example: in May, 2,000 British soldiers invaded French North America; in June, the Royal Navy captured nearly 300 French fishing vessels off Newfoundland and their 4,000 crew, both hitting France economically and reducing the French navy's potential recruitment pool of experienced seamen. The invasion of Saxony by Prussian troops, in August 1756, triggered what was later known as the Seven Years' War. France supported Austria and Russia in a land campaign against Prussia, and launched what she saw as her main effort in a maritime and colonial offensive against Great Britain.

By the beginning of 1759 neither alliance had the advantage, in either the land or sea campaigns. Both France and Great Britain were having serious problems financing the war. In 1759 over 60% of French revenue went to service its debt, causing numerous shortages. The French navy in particular was overstretched and suffered from the lack of a coherent doctrine, exacerbated by the inexperience verging on incompetence of the Secretary of State for the Navy, Nicolas René Berryer, a former chief of police. Meanwhile, Britain's war effort over the first three years of the war had been a failure. From the summer of 1757 the British war effort came under the control of William Pitt, who imposed an assertive and coordinated strategy. It consisted of a naval and colonial effort to expel the French from North America and ruin their maritime trade, while dispersing their efforts between fighting Prussia in Europe and attempting to defend the wide range of French overseas possessions. By early 1759 this was beginning to bear fruit.

== Invasion plans ==
=== Conception ===
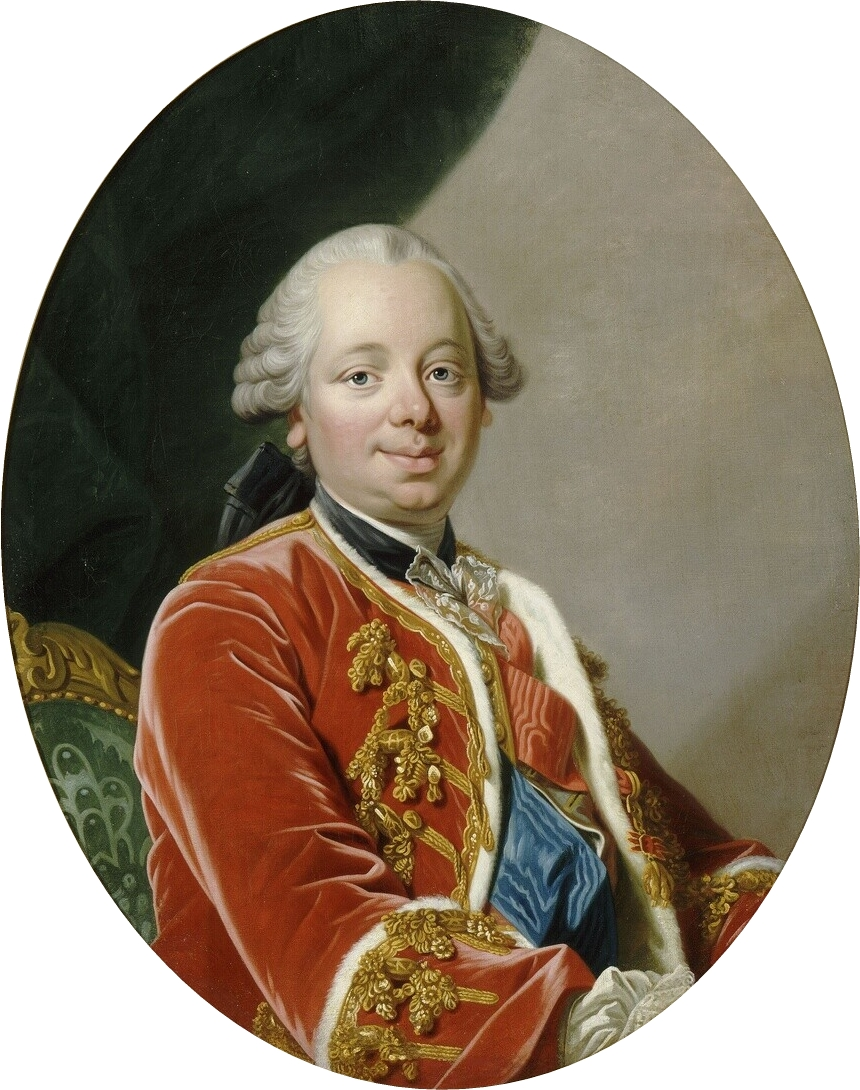
The Duke of Choiseul was the principal author of the invasion plan, with which he hoped to end the war against Britain with a single masterstroke.

The invasion was planned by Étienne François de Choiseul, Duke of Choiseul who became French foreign minister in December 1758 and effectively served as Prime Minister during the period of the mooted invasion. He wanted to launch a bold initiative that would knock Britain out of the war with one stroke. French pride had been stung the previous year by the ease with which the British had captured Louisbourg and launched amphibious raids on the French coast during 1758, such as that against Cherbourg. British financial subsidies and military aid to her only ally Prussia had kept that country afloat since 1756. Choiseul's brief as foreign minister was to overturn this situation.

Choiseul was interested in the concept of a French invasion of Britain. He perceived that Britain's strength was its naval power. He saw that if a large French force managed to cross the Channel without being intercepted, it could triumph over the relatively weak British land forces. Choiseul initially ignored perceived wisdom that any invasion would have to involve French warships. He believed that trying to bring warships out of the blockaded port at Brest would cause unnecessary delays, and could be disastrous. A mixed force as he saw it would suffer the same fate as the Spanish Armada. A previous attempt by France in 1744 had had to be abandoned.

His conception was relatively simple: a massive fleet of flat-bottomed transport craft would carry an army of 100,000 troops across the Channel where they would be landed on the coast of southern England. An essential component of the plan was speed. The French would wait for a favourable wind and cross the Channel quickly. Once they landed, they believed they would easily overpower the small army Britain retained on home soil and end the war. Choiseul managed to overcome opposition in the French cabinet and the invasion was approved as the cornerstone of French strategy for 1759 along with an attempt to capture Hanover.

=== Jacobite involvement ===
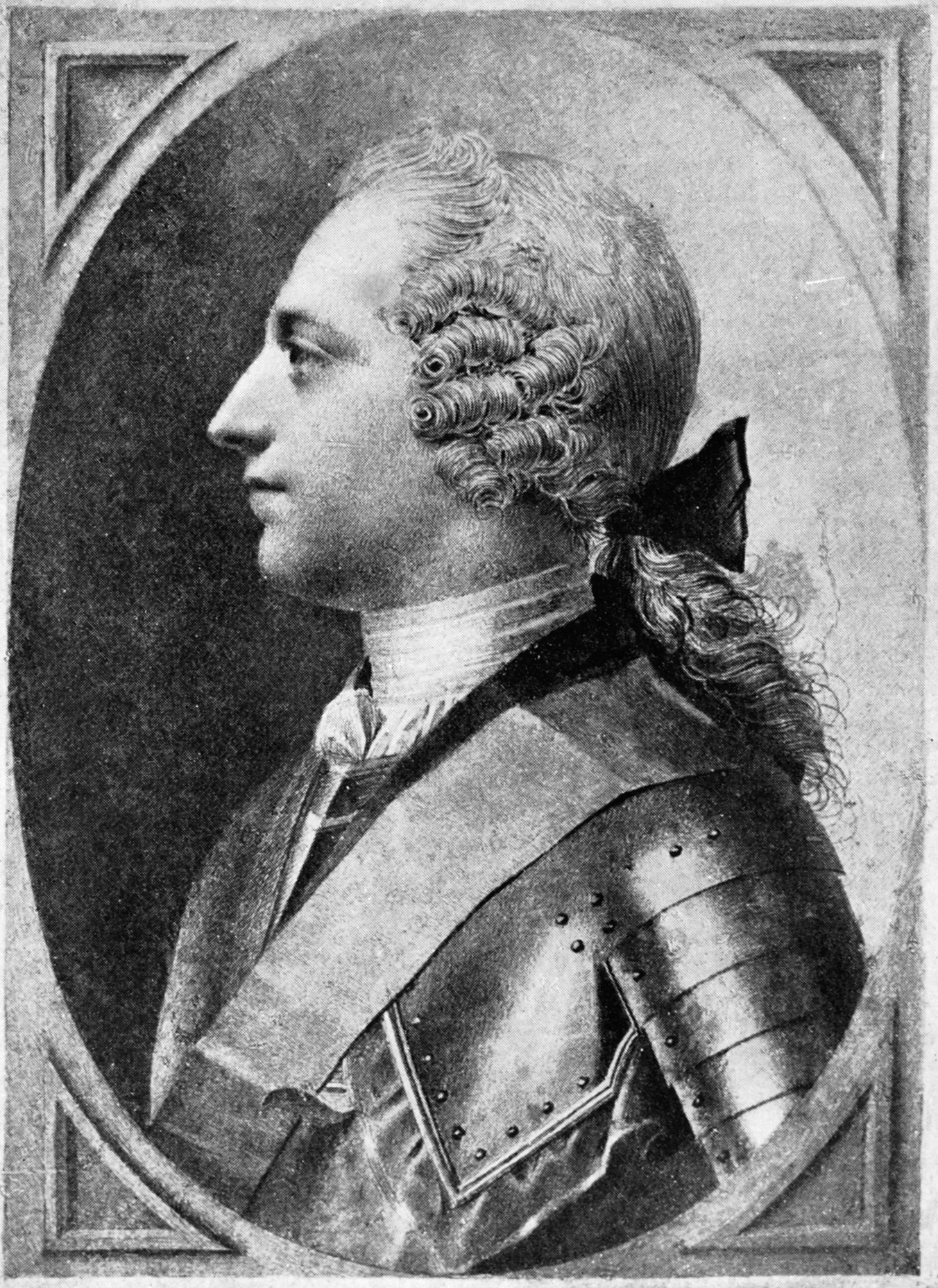
Prince Charles Edward Stuart, after a portrait by Giles Hussey

As part of the scheme the French considered trying to start a Jacobite rebellion, as they had in 1745, by sending the heir apparent of the Jacobite movement Charles Edward Stuart with or ahead of the invading forces. A secret meeting was arranged with Charles Stuart in Paris in February 1759, but it went badly. Charles turned up late and drunk, and proved surly and uncooperative. Convinced that the Jacobites were of little material help, Choiseul dropped them from the plan. From then on, any French landing would have to be entirely accomplished by French troops. He did however consider sending Charles to Ireland where he could be declared King of Ireland and lead a rebellion. Eventually the French decided to try to recruit Jacobite supporters without involving Charles directly in the operation – as he was considered a potential liability.

France also sought support from Denmark and Russia to provide troops and naval stores for the expedition, but both declined to participate. Sweden initially agreed to take part in the scheme by sending an invasion force to Scotland, but later backed out of this arrangement. The Dutch Republic, traditionally a British ally but neutral at the time, was deeply alarmed by the French actions, and demanded assurances that the French were not planning to place the pretender Stuart on the British throne, an action they believed would threaten their own security. The French ambassador assured them they were not.

=== British response ===
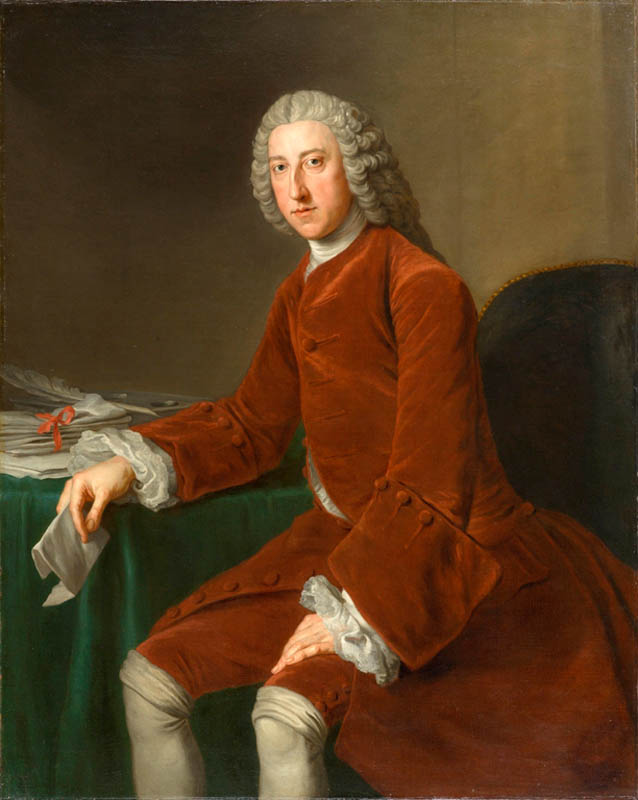
William Pitt was the British war leader, and mobilised Britain's defences against the invasion threat.

The British were well aware of these developments through a well-established network of secret agents. On 19 February the British war cabinet met at Lord Anson's house to discuss the potential invasion. Both William Pitt and the Prime Minister, the Duke of Newcastle, were extremely bullish about the prospects of the campaign. A few proposals were made, such as stationing troops on the Isle of Wight, but the consensus was that existing strategy was already sufficient to deal with the invasion threat. No plans were made for the withdrawal of British troops in Germany or to request that Hanoverian troops be sent to defend Britain.

Pitt was committed to despatching expeditions to French colonies around the world, a policy that had proved successful. It had, however, deprived Britain of necessary troops to defend itself from a European invasion. In response to this the government had pushed through a Militia Act which created a large militia to defend Britain. The fighting capabilities of this force were untested, though it provided the British with a much larger force on paper than her regular troops alone. General John Ligonier, 1st Viscount Ligonier estimated that he would have only 10,000 regular troops immediately available to resist any French landing.

A tight blockade was maintained on major French ports throughout 1759 under the command of Admiral Sir Edward Hawke. It proved crippling, as it denied France valuable colonial shipping supplies, and the ease with which the Blockaders kept the French fleet bottled up was shattering to French morale. Improvements in supply arrangements had enabled the British to maintain a continuous blockade, something they had failed to accomplish previously. The British shared conventional wisdom that any invasion would have to involve the Brest fleet, but kept a close watch on all potential departure points.

=== French preparations ===
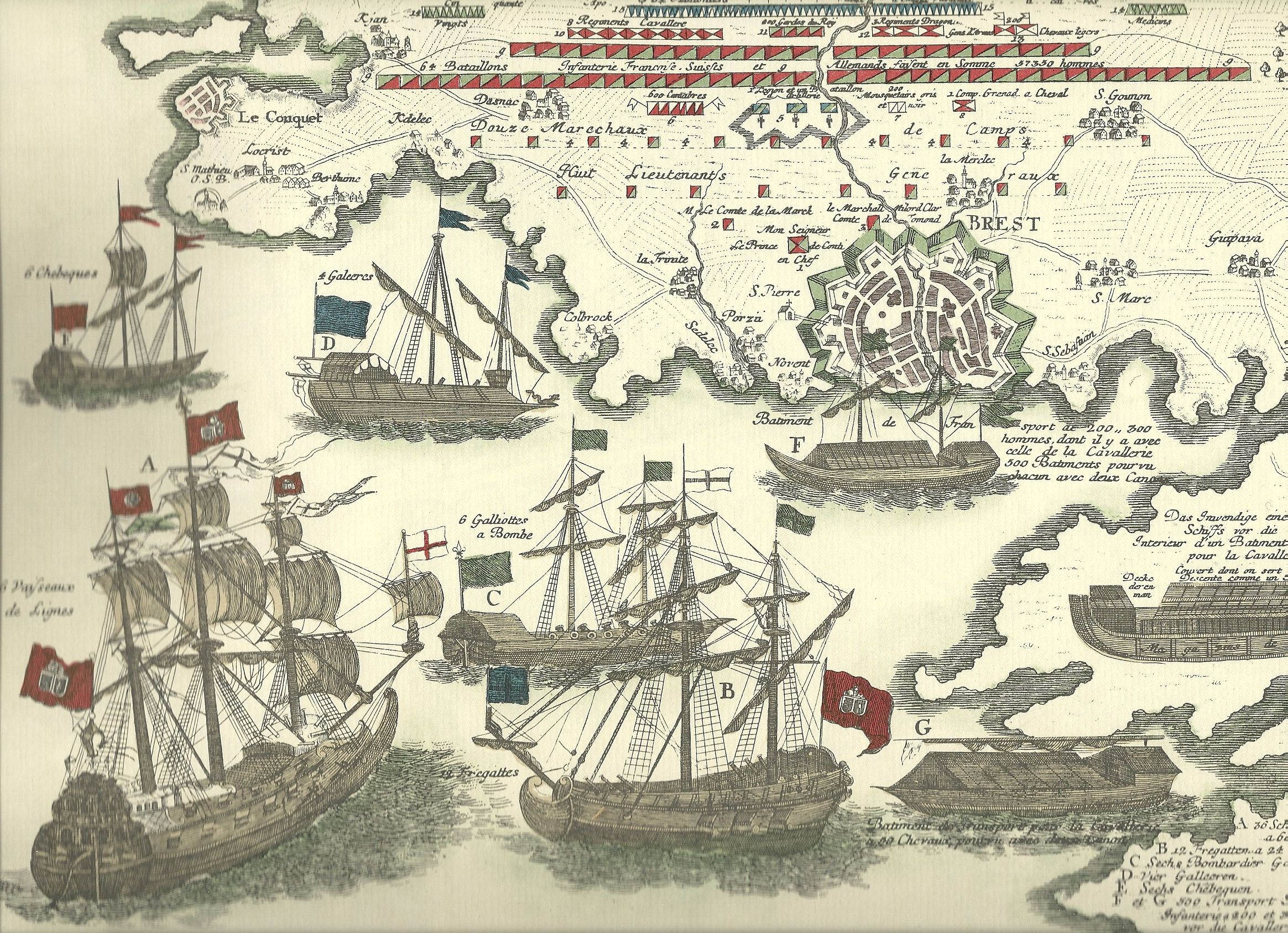
French Fleet with French and Imperial German troops in Brest, 1759

During 1759 the French pressed on with their preparations. Hundreds of the flat-bottomed transport craft were constructed in Le Havre, Brest, St Malo, Nantes, Morlaix and Lorient. An estimated 30 million livres was spent on the construction of the boats. A number of small but well-armed escorts were also constructed. By midsummer, more than 325 transports were nearing completion. 48,000 troops were immediately ready to take part in the invasion. Drills were conducted which found the French troops could embark and disembark from the ships in just seven minutes.

Throughout the year, several points of the plan were altered, but it remained the same in essence. In spite of opposition from within the French cabinet (particularly the war minister Belle-Isle), Choiseul insisted on launching the crossing without fleet support. The French decided to launch the invasion force entirely from Le Havre, a large harbour some distance from the blockading British fleet at Brest. A smaller diversionary force would leave from Dunkirk.

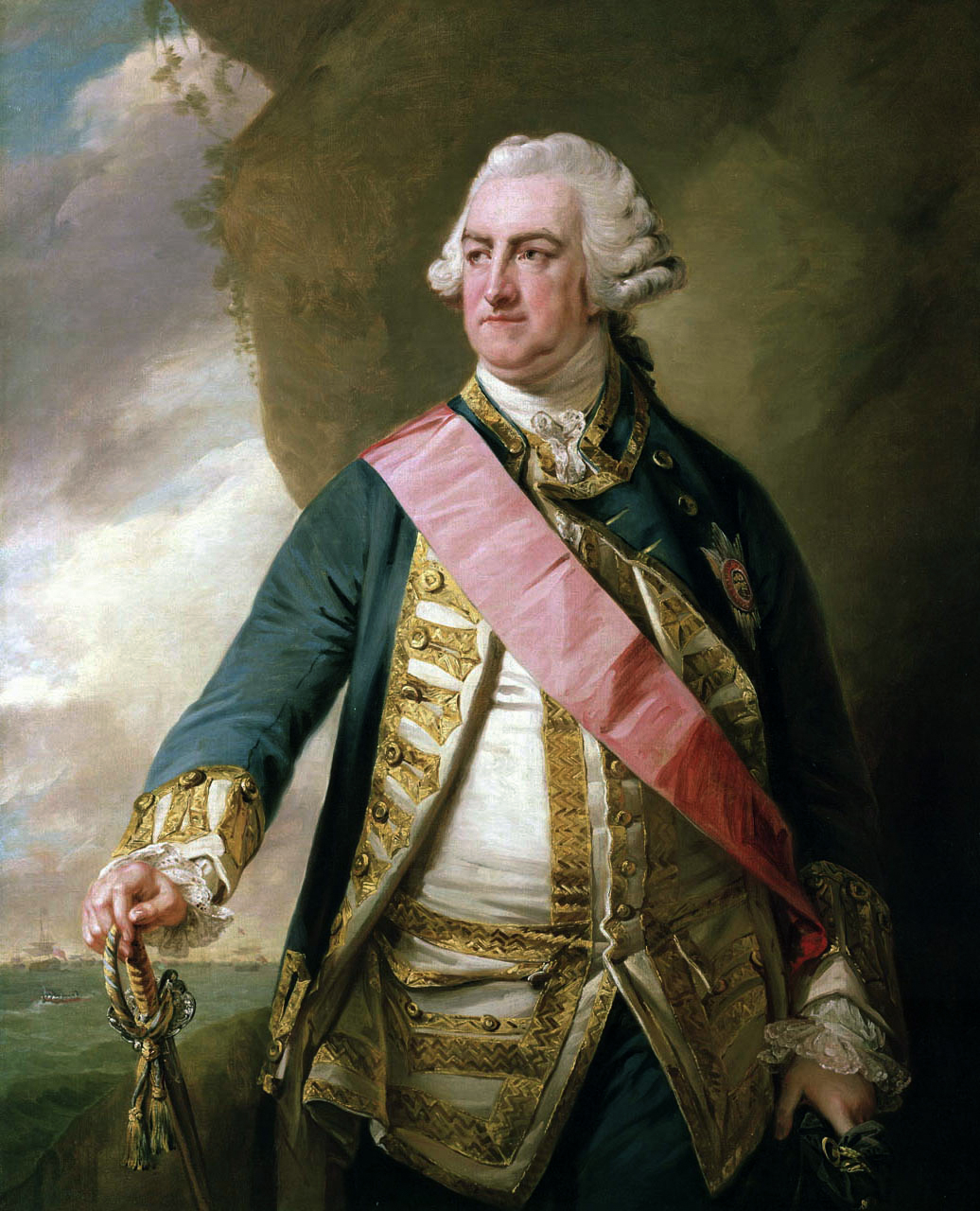
Sir Edward Hawke's fleet kept up a constant blockade of the French coast throughout 1759.

In June, French planners agreed that a separate, smaller force would be sent to Scotland to try to gain Jacobite support, and crush British resistance in a pincer movement. Emmanuel Armand de Vignerot du Plessis, Duke of Aiguillon was selected to take command of this force. Once landing on the Clyde approximately 20,000 Scottish Jacobites, mostly Highland clansmen, would rise and join him. Command of the larger southern invasion was given to Charles, Prince of Soubise. Plans called for Soubise's force to wait for good winds, and then cross the Channel speedily from Le Havre, landing in Portsmouth.

== French naval defeats ==
=== Le Havre raid ===
The surprise Le Havre raid by British forces in early July did considerable damage, destroying a number of the transports. However, the success of the venture lured the British commanders into a false sense of security, making them believe it had been a greater setback than it had in fact. The French intended to capitalise on this, but scaled back their initial plans. A War Council in Paris decided to launch the expedition to Scotland first, and if it was successful, send follow-up forces to Portsmouth and Maldon. Exact details were left vague to enable them to respond to changing circumstances.

Delays to the assembly of the invasion force pushed back the date of the launch, and the sea grew rougher and more dangerous to cross. Some French leaders were wary of putting the fleet to sea in potentially bad weather, but the need for a major victory to restore French morale and win an honourable peace overruled their concerns. In October, Aiguillon arrived at his command centre at Vannes, near to where much of his army had gathered. For five days after 15 October, the British blockading squadrons were forced to withdraw from the French coast by a storm, leaving the French invasion forces free to sail. Hubert de Brienne declined to leave harbour, as he believed his fleet was not ready, and on 20 October the British returned to blockade the French Atlantic ports again.

=== Battle of Lagos ===
In summer 1759, the French Toulon fleet under Admiral La Clue slipped through the blockade and sailed out through the Straits of Gibraltar. They were caught and defeated by a British fleet at the Battle of Lagos in August. Their intended destination had been the West Indies, but the loss of ships and men stretched the French fleet almost to breaking point, and raised questions about the viability of the invasion.

=== Battle of Quiberon Bay ===
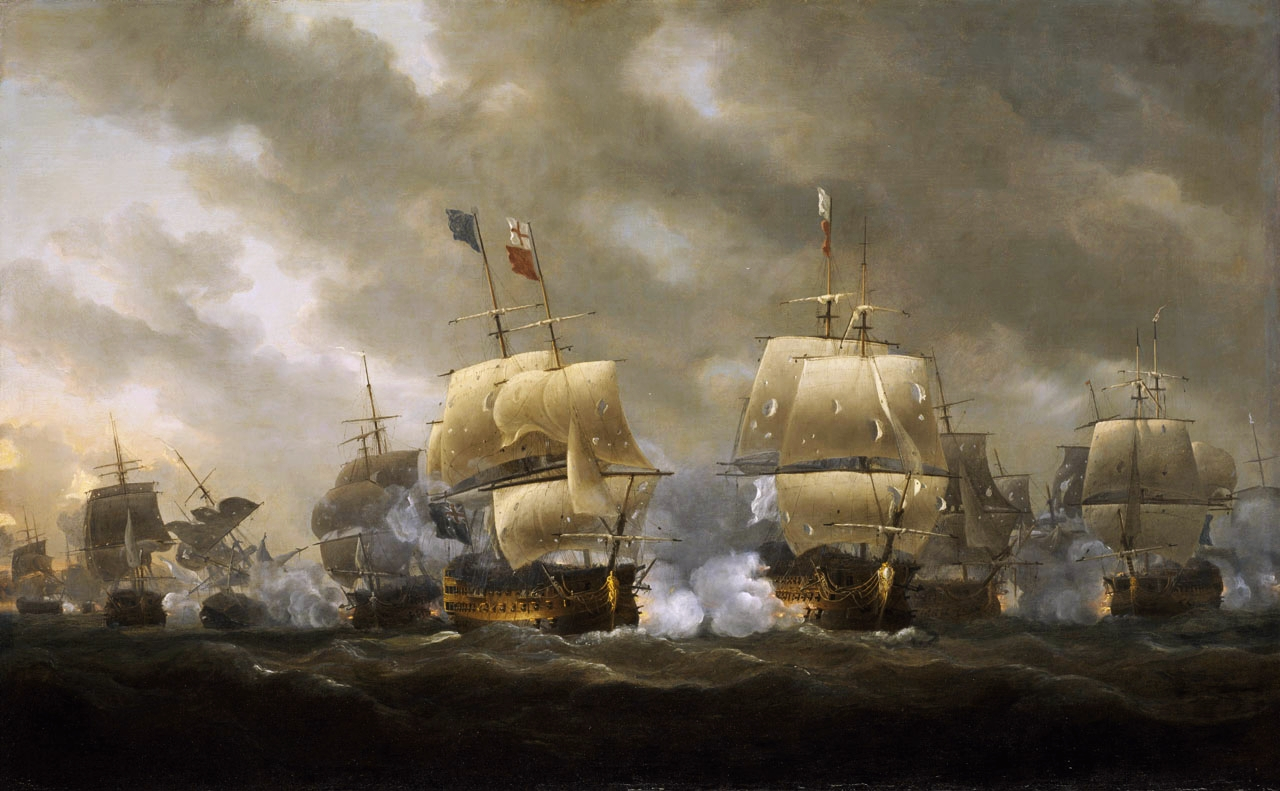
The French naval defeat at Quiberon Bay proved a devastating setback to the planned invasion, and was one of the major reasons behind its ultimate cancellation

The invasion plan received a crippling blow in November, when the French Brest Squadron was heavily defeated at the Battle of Quiberon Bay. De Brienne had sailed from Brest on 15 November heading a hundred miles down the coast to Quiberon Bay, where the invasion army was now waiting to board his transports. De Brienne's fleet became caught in a storm which slowed them down and allowed a pursuing British fleet under Hawke a chance to catch up with them.

Meeting at the mouth of Quiberon Bay on 21 November, the two fleets closed in on each other. De Brienne initially formed a line of battle and prepared to engage, but then changed his mind and his ships raced to take shelter in the bay. Hawke pursued, taking a high risk in the middle of a violent storm, and captured or drove ashore five French ships. The remainder managed to find shelter in the bay. They were now blockaded in by the British fleet, and most were abandoned and their guns taken off them. Only three ships ever sailed again, a devastating setback to the French Channel fleet. The crushing defeat at Quiberon Bay ended any real hope of a major invasion of the British Isles.

== Landing in Ireland ==
A privateer, François Thurot, sailed from Dunkirk with five ships to provide diversionary support to the invasion. In 1760 he landed on the northern Irish coast and set up a base at Carrickfergus. Had he not repeatedly clashed with the commander of the land expedition, the force might have captured poorly defended Belfast. Having sailed for home, the Royal Navy killed Thurot and destroyed his squadron in the Irish Channel. By this point, the French had abandoned the invasion. However, many French people took heart from Thurot's expedition as it demonstrated that French forces could land in the British Isles. Madame de Pompadour suggested that France would have won at Quiberon, had Thurot been in command instead of de Briennes.

== Abandonment ==
With the Brest fleet destroyed at Quiberon Bay, they were now unable to escort the French troops across the Channel. Some now began pressing Choiseul for a return to the original plan of an unescorted crossing, suggesting that the invasion be postponed to early 1760.

1759 was a disastrous year for the French war effort. They suffered severe defeats in Canada, the West Indies, Europe and India. Choiseul was particularly disappointed by the poor performance of the French navy. As word of these disasters poured in, the extent to which France's forces were now stretched became clear. Realising they needed the French forces earmarked for the invasion elsewhere, particularly in Germany to fight Hanover, Choiseul reluctantly called off the invasion.

He remained hopeful that it might still be possible at some future date, but the war situation continued to deteriorate for France during the next few years particularly when Spain entered the war as a French ally in 1761. Choiseul began in 1762 to plan a fresh invasion, but this was also abandoned when an armistice was signed.

== Aftermath ==
The French fully abandoned the plan in 1763, when the Peace of Paris mandated a general cessation of hostilities. Choiseul continued to advocate a direct strike against Britain as the way to win future wars, and despatched engineers and agents to examine British defences in preparation. During the Falklands Crisis of 1770 he proposed a similar action, but was dismissed by the French King, Louis XV. Further French invasions were planned in 1779 during the American War of Independence, and by Napoleon in 1803–04, but none came to fruition for much the same reasons as Choiseul's 1759 campaign had been abandoned.

== See also ==
- Great Britain in the Seven Years' War

== Notes, citations and sources ==
=== Sources ===
- Anderson, Fred (2000). Crucible of War: The Seven Years' War and the Fate of Empire in British North America, 1754–1766. London: Faber and Faber. ISBN 9780571205356.
- Chaline, Oliver (2011). "Quiberon Bay, 20 novembre 1759". Les cahiers du Pays de Guérande (in French) (53). Société des Amis de Guérande: 17–29. ISSN 0765-3565.
- La Condamine, Pierre de (2000). Le combat des Cardinaux : 20 novembre 1759, baie de Quiberon et rade du Croisic (in French). La Turballe: L'Esprit large-Éd. Alizés. ISBN 978-2911835032.
- Ériau, Jean-Michel (2011). "La Bataille du Croisic". Les cahiers du Pays de Guérande (in French) (53). Société des Amis de Guérande: 17–29. ISSN 0765-3565.
- Goodman, Elise (2000). The portraits of Madame de Pompadour: Celebrating the Femme Savante. Berkeley: University of California Press. ISBN 978-0520224087.
- Jenkins, E.H. (1973). A History of the French Navy : From Its Beginnings to the Present Day. London: Macdonald and Janeś. ISBN 978-0356041964.
- "The Battle of the Monongahela, 1755". Library of Congress. World Digital Library. 2017.
- Longmate, Norman (1993). Island Fortress: The Defence of Great Britain, 1603–1945. London: Harper Collins. ISBN 978-0586208465..
- McLynn, Frank (2005). 1759: the Year Britain Became Master of the World. London: Pimlico. ISBN 978-0099526391.
- Middleton, Richard (1988). "Naval Administration in the Age of Pitt and Anson, 1755-1763". In Black, Jeremy & Woodfine, Philip (eds.). The British Navy and the Use of Naval Power in the Eighteenth Century. Leicester: Leicester University Press. pp. 109–127. OCLC 572510434.
- le Moing, Guy (2003). La Bataille navale des Cardinaux: 20 novembre 1759 (in French). Paris: Economica. ISBN 978-2717845037.
- Rodger, N.A.M. (2004). The Command of the Ocean. London: Penguin. ISBN 978-0713884111.
- Rodger, N. A. M. (1993), The Insatiable Earl: A Life of John Montagu, Fourth Earl of Sandwich, London: Harper Collins
- Simms, Brendan (2008), Three Victories and a Defeat: The Rise and Fall of the First British Empire, London: Penguin Books, ISBN 978-0140289848
- Szabo, Franz A. J. (2007). The Seven Years' War in Europe 1756–1763. Harlow, Essex: Longman. ISBN 978-0582292727.
