= HMS Ludlow Castle =

Two vessels of the Royal Navy have been named HMS Ludlow Castle after Ludlow Castle in Shropshire:

- HMS Ludlow Castle (1707) was a 42-gun 1706 Establishment frigate launched in 1707 and rebuilt as a 40-gun 1719 Establishment frigate in 1723. She was hulked at Antigua in 1743 and sold in 1749.
- HMS Ludlow Castle (1744) was a 44-gun 1741 Establishment frigate launched in 1744 and rebuilt as a 26-gun frigate in 1762. She was broken up at Portsmouth in 1771.
