= Thomas de Lacy =

Irish Anglican priest

Thomas de Lacy (1773–1844) was a 19th-century Anglican priest in Ireland.

== Life ==
Lacy was born in County Dublin in 1773 and educated at Trinity College, Dublin.

He was Rector of Kilskeer; and archdeacon of Meath from 1799.

He married Katherine (a.k.a. Kate) Moutray in 1806. Katherine was the daughter of John and Mary Moutray who had lived in Antigua.

He died still the archdeacon on 8 February 1844.
