= Le Havre raid =

1759 battle of the Seven Years' War

- Part of the Seven Years' War
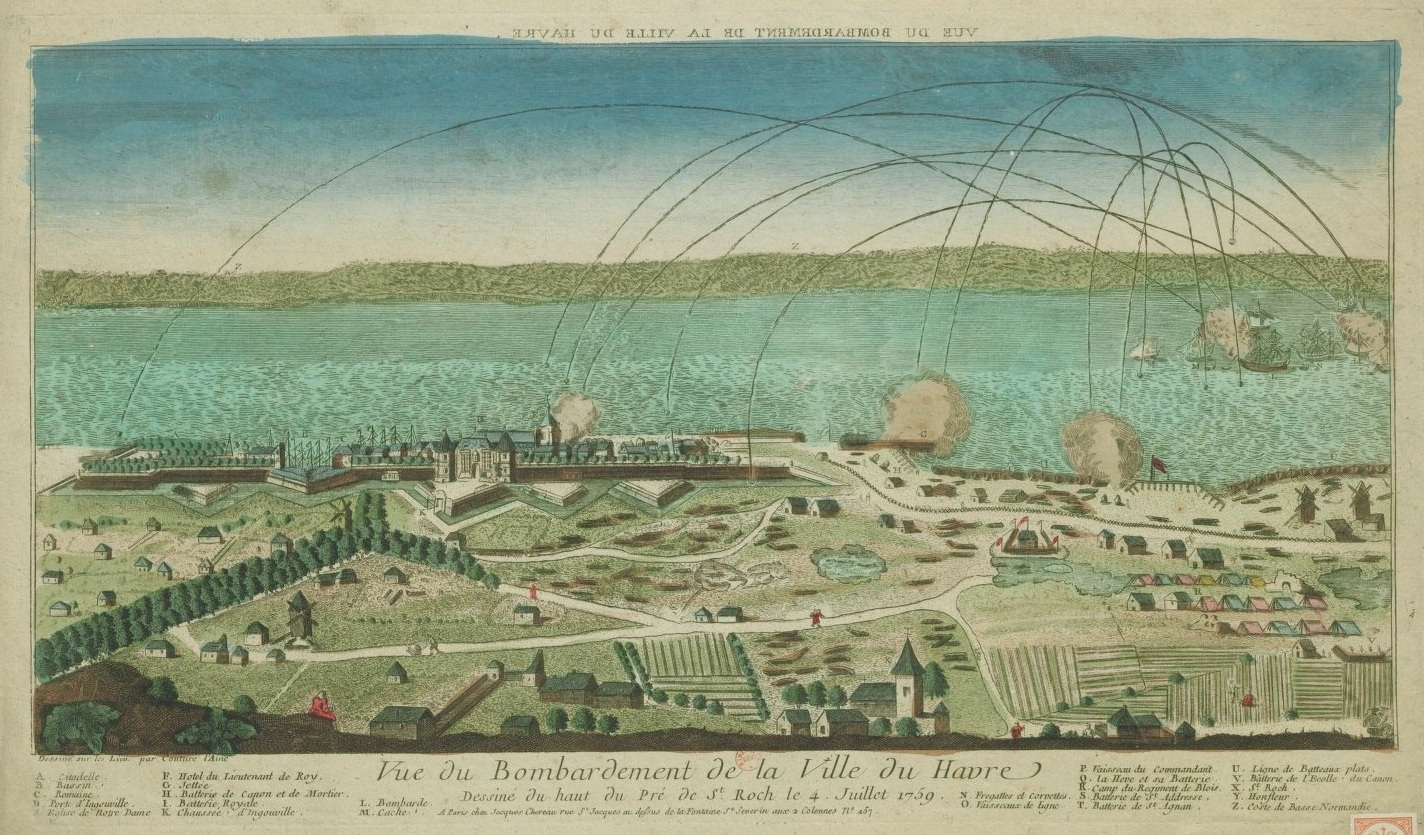
- c. 1800 engraving of the raid
Date	3–5 July 1759
Location	Le Havre, France 49°26′14″N 0°8′40″E
Result	British victory: Beginning of the Annus Mirabilis of 1759

Belligerents
Great Britain	France

Commanders and leaders
George Rodney	Charles, Prince of Soubise

Strength
5 ships of the line 5 frigates 1 sloop 6 bomb ketches	8,000; 12 prams 337 barges

Casualties and losses
Unknown	Several barges destroyed

The Le Havre raid was a two-day naval bombardment of the French port of Le Havre early in July 1759 by a Royal Navy fleet under Rear-Admiral of the Blue George Rodney during the Seven Years' War, which succeeded in its aim of destroying many of the invasion barges being gathered there for the planned French invasion of Britain.

== Background ==
By the summer of 1759 Étienne François de Choiseul, Duke of Choiseul's planned invasion of Britain was underway, with intensive naval preparations being made in the French ports in the Atlantic and in the Channel: Brest, Le Havre, Rochefort and Toulon. Troops were assembled at a number of points, principally at Dunkirk, Saint-Omer, Ostend, Lille and Vannes. Choiseul had decided that Le Havre was to be the main base for the Prince de Soubise's strike at England, as it lay on the Seine and troop movement was far easier than any other French port.

The British had received intelligence that the French had a number of flat-bottomed boats at Le Havre for disembarking troops.

== Raid ==
Rear-Admiral of the Blue George Rodney was detached at the beginning of July with a fleet and sailed from Spithead on 2 July, arriving off Le Havre. Rodney's fleet consisted of the 60-gun ship of the line HMS Achilles as flagship, four 50-gun fourth-rates, five frigates, a sloop, and six bomb ketches and anchored there, with the bomb vessels positioned in the narrow channel of the river leading to Honfleur. The next day the attack commenced on the flat-bottomed boats and supplies which had been collected there. Over 3000 shells were fired at the principal targets – the magazines, batteries and the boats, as well as into the town for fifty consecutive hours. Rodney, with some of his frigates, remained off the port for the rest of the year, and captured numerous prizes.

The bombardment did immense damage, while Rodney's fleet received little harm in return from a numerous body of French troops who came down to the shore and under the cover of entrenchments and batteries kept up an active fire upon the assailants. The town was set on fire in several places and burned with great fury while the inhabitants fled.

== Aftermath ==
The success of the venture, however, lured the British commanders into a false sense of security, making them believe it had been a greater setback than it had. The French intended to capitalise on this, but scaled back their initial plans instead.

In summer 1759, the French Toulon fleet sailed out through the Straits of Gibraltar but was caught and defeated by a British fleet at the Battle of Lagos in August. In November of that year, the French Brest Squadron was decisively defeated at the Battle of Quiberon Bay. With these two defeats combined – the invasion plans received a crippling blow.

The victory helped contribute to what became known as the Annus Mirabilis in Great Britain.

== Line of battle ==
=== Ships of the line ===
- Achilles (60), flagship, Captain Samuel Barrington
- Chatham (50), Captain John Lockhart
- Deptford (50), Captain John Hollwell
- Isis (50), Captain Edward Wheeler
- Norwich (50), Captain George Darby

=== Frigates ===
- Brilliant (36), Captain Hyde Parker
- Juno (36), Captain Henry John Philips
- Vestal (32), Captain Samuel Hood
- Boreas (28), Captain Robert Boyle
- Unicorn (28), Captain Thomas Graves

=== Sloop ===
- Wolf (8), Commander Hugh Bromedge

=== Bomb ketches ===
- Furnace, Commander Jonathan Faulknor
- Firedrake, Commander James Orrok
- Basilisk, Commander John Clarke
- Mortar, Commander Joseph Hunt
- Carcass, Commander Charles Inglis
- Blast, Commander Thomas Willis
