= HMS Salisbury (1769) =

50-gun fourth-rate ship of the line of the Royal Navy

History

Great Britain
- Name: Salisbury
- Builder: Chatham Dockyard
- Launched: 2 October 1769
- Fate: Wrecked near San Domingo, 13 May 1796

General characteristics
- Tons burthen: 1,051 81/94
- Length: 146 ft 0 in (44.50 m) (gundeck); 120 ft 5 1/4 in (36.709 m) (keel)
- Depth of hold: 17 ft 4 in (5.28 m)
- Propulsion: Sails
- Sail plan: Full-rigged ship
- Armament: 50 guns: Lower gun deck: 22 × 24-pdrs; Upper gun deck: 22 × 12-pdrs; Quarterdeck: 4 × 6-pdrs; Forecastle: 2 × 6-pdrs

HMS Salisbury was a 50-gun fourth-rate ship of the line of the Royal Navy.

== Service ==
The Salisbury was built at Chatham Dockyard by Joseph Harris to the design of Sir Thomas Slade, and launched on 2 October 1769. She participated in Admiral Edward Hawke's Western Squadron in the Mediterranean, and undertook several voyages to the West Indies.

=== Fate ===
The Salisbury was grounded on 13 May 1796 near Santo Domingo and surrendered to the Spanish.
