= John Moutray =

Captain John Moutray of Roscobie
- Born: c.1722
- Died: 22 November 1785; Bath, Somerset
- Burial place: Bath Abbey
- Spouse: Mary Moutray
- Children: John and Catherine
- Military career
- Allegiance: Great Britain
- Branch: Royal Navy
- Service years: c.1744–1785
- Rank: Captain
- Commands: HMS Thetis; HMS Emerald; HMS Thames; HMS Warwick; HMS Britannia; HMS Ramillies; HMS Edgar; HMS Vengeance; Resident Commissioner Antigua
- Conflicts: War of the Austrian Succession; First Battle of Cape Finisterre; Seven Years' War; Battle of Fort Beauséjour; American Revolutionary War; Battle of Cape Spartel
- Memorials: Bath Abbey

John Moutray of Roscobie (c.1722 – 22 November 1785) was an officer of the Royal Navy. He reached the rank of post-captain and served as the Royal Commissioner for English Harbour in Antigua.

== Biography ==
Moutray was born in about 1722. He was married to Mary Pemble on 2 September 1771. She was thirty years younger than him.

He was promoted to post-captain on 28 December 1758.

On 29 July 1780 a convoy of 63 ships were bound for the East Indies and West Indies. It left Great Britain under the care of Captain Moutray, in the 74-gun HMS Ramillies, and was accompanied by the 36-gun frigates HMS Thetis and HMS Southampton. On 8 August unusual sails were seen, but Moutray ignored them. Later and belatedly Moutray signalled his ships to alter course and follow him close to the wind. They paid no attention to his orders, and by daylight that day a combined Franco-Spanish fleet had captured the bulk of the convoy.

The warships escaped with eight of the convoy; the other 55 merchantmen were captured, with the loss of their cargoes worth a million and a half, and 2,805 prisoners. It was a blow to British commerce, and especially to the forces in the West Indies, which lost a vast quantity of military stores.

The merchants at home were so enraged, Captain Moutray had to be tried by court-martial. He claimed that others had falsified records for an unknown motive. He was dismissed him from his ship. However, before long he was again employed. Later historians have noted that there should have been a larger escort if the cargo was so valuable.

He went on to become the Commissioner of the naval dockyard in the Leeward Islands from April 1784 until 1785, where he, and particularly Mary Moutray his wife, became friends with Cuthbert Collingwood and Horatio Nelson. He died on 22 November 1785 in Bath, Somerset at the age of 62.

Moutray was buried at Bath Abbey four days later. He left his estate to his wife and children. His will also refers to two children he had by a woman named Elspeth London.

His wife petitioned for a pension and despite having Royal support the request was denied. Nelson took an interest in their son John and when he died he paid for a memorial. John and Mary's daughter Katherine (aka Kate) married the Thomas de Lacy archdeacon of Meath in 1806.

== Memorials ==
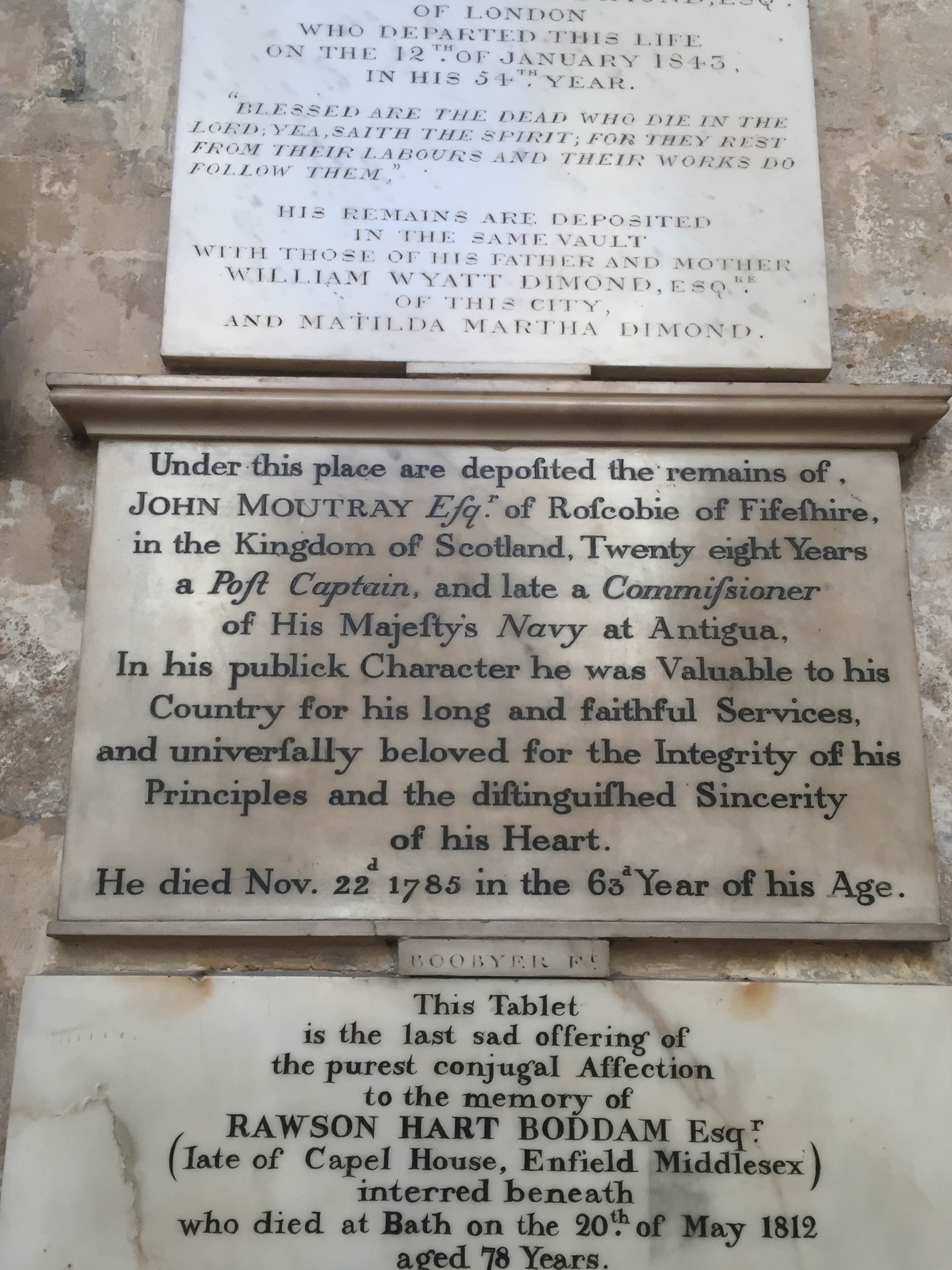
John Moutray Epitaph in Bath Abbey

Buried at Bath Abbey, His epitaph reads:

Under this place are deposited the remains of John Moutray Esq of Roscobie in Fifeshire in the Kingdom of Scotland twenty eight years a post captain and late a Commissioner of His Majesty's Navy in Antigua. In his public character he was valuable to his country for his long and faithful services and universally beloved for the integrity of his principles and the distinguished sincerity of his heart. He died 22 Nov 1785 in the 63rd year of his age".
