= Luis de Córdova y Córdova =

Spanish Navy officer (1706–1796)

Luis de Córdova
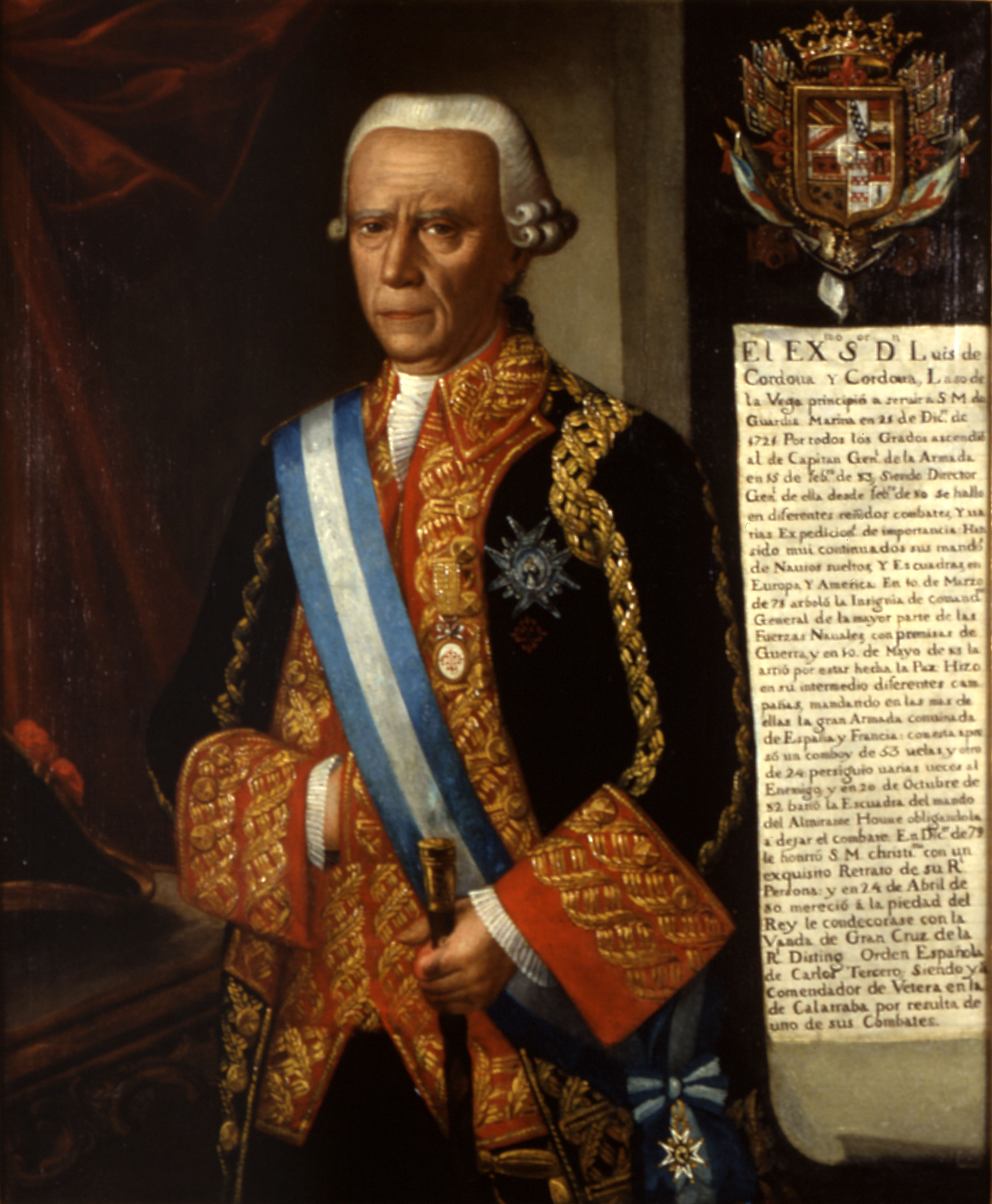
- Portrait of Córdova
- Born: 8 February 1706; Sevilla, Spain
- Died: 29 July 1796 (aged 90); Cádiz, Spain
- Military career
- Allegiance: Spain
- Branch: Spanish Navy
- Rank: Admiral
- Conflicts: War of the Polish Succession; Battle of Bitonto; Action of 28 November 1751; Anglo-Spanish War (1779–1783); Armada of 1779; Action of 9 August 1780; Battle of Cape Spartel

Admiral Luis de Córdova y Córdova, sometimes spelt Córdoba (8 February 1706 – 29 July 1796) was a Spanish Navy officer. Known for his service in the Navy during the Anglo-Spanish War, his best remembered actions were the capture of two merchant convoys totalling 79 ships between 1780 and 1782, including the capture of 55 ships from a convoy composed of Indiamen, and other cargo ships 60 leagues off Cape St. Vincent. In 1782 he battled the Royal Navy to a stalemate at the Battle of Cape Spartel, but failed to prevent the British relieving the Great Siege of Gibraltar.

== Early life ==
Córdova was born in Seville to don Juan de Córdova Lasso de la Vega y Puente, a mariner, navy captain, and knight of the Order of Calatrava, and doña Clemencia Fernández de Córdova Lasso de la Vega Veintimiglia, daughter of the Marquis of Vado del Maestre and first-cousin of her husband. He was baptised at San Miguel parish on 12 February. Despite being known in historiography as Luis de Córdoba y Córdoba, his actual surnames, from both his paternal and maternal side, were “Fernández de Córdoba”, one of the most illustrious noble houses in Spain, whose most notorious member was El Gran Capitán.

His inclination toward the sea began at a young age — at 11 he enlisted aboard his father's ship and by 13 he had made his first journey to America. In 1721 he joined the naval academy at Cádiz and by 1723 graduated with the rank of Alférez de Fragata (ensign). The first lap of his career was marked by successful cruises and actions at sea that won the approval of his superiors and even the praise of the King.

In 1730 Córdova had the distinction of commanding the naval escort for the Duke of Parma, Infante Carlos de Borbón (later Charles III of Spain), who journeyed across the Mediterranean en route to the campaigns in Italy. Carlos and his generals went on to reconquer the Kingdom of Naples for the Bourbons at the Battle of Bitonto, with naval assistance from a squadron commanded by Córdova.

In 1732 he was promoted to lieutenant on a frigate, the year in which he participated in the capture of Oran. Two years later he would do it in the reconquest of Naples and Sicily.

== The Order of Calatrava ==
In 1735 he was promoted to lieutenant and in August 1740 to captain of a frigate. This same year he took part in the fights against the Algerian pirates in the Mediterranean. He was appointed captain of the ship in 1747, and in command of the ship América, in union with the Dragon (both with 60 guns), under the command of Pedro Fitz-James Stuart (later the Marquis of San Leonardo), they engaged in combat near Cape Saint Vincent against the Algerian ships Danzik (60 guns) and Castillo Nuevo (54), the first captain of Algiers. The New Castle withdrew at the first volleys, but the Danzik continued fighting for about 30 hours in the space of four days, until it lost half its crew.2 After a sieve, it lowered its flag and had to be burned as it could not be used. . Fifty Christian captives were rescued. For this action, King Ferdinand VI granted Córdoba a commission from the Order of Calatrava.3

The city of Cordova, Alaska was named after him.

== America and England ==
Later he took part in the escort of various convoys of the Carrera de Indias, and in the period 1754-1758 he had some outstanding performances in which he fought smuggling in Cartagena de Indias. In the absence of the rank of brigadier at that time, which was created in 1773, he was directly promoted to squad leader on July 13, 1760. He then took command of a squadron with which he made multiple navigations, especially through North American waters, and with which he participated in various commissions, such as the gala parade held in 1765 in the waters of Cartagena to celebrate various events. He ended the command of said squad upon his return to Cádiz in March 1774, and in December of that same year he was promoted to lieutenant general, at 68 years of age.

Spain allied with France by family pacts, in the middle of the American war of independence Luis de Córdova was appointed commander of a Spanish squadron, which joined the French squad of Orvilliers when in June 1779 war was declared on Britain. The combined Franco-Spanish fleet, in which there were 68 ships - of which the Spanish Santísima Trinidad carried the Cordova insignia - entered the English Channel to attempt the invasion of the British Isles in August 1779. The campaign ultimately ended in failure, since differences of opinion arose between the French and Spanish command. The former wanted at all costs to destroy the British Channel Fleet first, and then carry out the planned landing in Great Britain. The Spanish advocated to carry out the disembarkation immediately, on the grounds that the Channel Fleet was not in a position to avoid it. In the end there was no landing, and the facts proved the Spaniards right. With isolated actions, the British hindered the actions of the combined fleet and managed to prepare to face the situation, which together with bad weather, scurvy and a typhus epidemic that affected the Franco-Spanish crews, made the allied squad desist, who retired to Brest.

The French general, Count of Guichen, was amazed that Córdova took certain precautions against bad weather when the weather was still good and, on the contrary, that he ordered them to be suspended while it was still in the end of a storm and to them it seemed full. strength of him. The French admiral asked Mazarredo where such a forecast came from and the major general showed him the marine barometers that the Spanish ships had begun to use when the French allies did not yet have them. For his role in the failed campaign, Córdova received as a gift from King Louis XVI of France a gold box richly adorned with diamonds with the expressive dedication "Luis a Luis". On his side, the King of Spain awarded him the Grand Cross of Carlos III, at that time the most valuable distinction.

== General Director of the Spanish Navy ==
At that time, Luis de Córdova was already 73 years old, and many French people believed that, although in the past he had been a good officer, he was already very old and his head was failing. But Floridablanca, in a letter to Aranda dated November 27, 1779, said that it seemed to him that "the old man is more encouraged and suffered than the young men of Brest", and added that none of his detractors had been able to advance, improve or rectify none of your action plans. Due to this, on February 7, 1780 he was appointed general director of the Navy.

In the action of 9 August 1780, Córdova, commanding the same combined squadron, captured a British convoy of 55 merchant ships destined for British forces in North America and India and escorted by three warships near Cape Santa María. The warships went to the Spanish Navy with the names of Colón, Santa Balbina and Santa Paula. Córdoba took 3,000 sailors prisoner, plus 1,800 soldiers, valuing the captured loot at 1 million dollars. Despite the attacks that he was subjected to by British naval forces, which constituted the most distant protection of the convoy, he managed to lead his captured ships safely to Cádiz, which was lauded in the Spanish press and made him the hero in the eyes of the Spanish public.

In the 1781 campaign, also in the English Channel, his squadron suffered violent storms without experiencing setbacks and serious ills, thanks to the correct dispositions taken by General Córdova seconded by his Major General José de Mazarredo. In this campaign he also captured another British convoy of 24 ships and took it to Brest. In these navigations and battles, the good instruction of the Spanish crews stood out, as a result of the efforts of the major general, effectively seconded by Escaño, at the time the assistant of the majority. Before they were published, the effects of what was to later become the Ordinances of the Navy, the product of the laborious work and experience of these two sailors, were beginning to be felt.

== The blockade of Gibraltar ==
Back in Spain, in 1782 he commanded the combined naval forces that had gathered in the bay of Algeciras to blockade Gibraltar and attempt to take it from the British. He participated with direct attacks on the square, on the occasion when Antonio Barceló commanded the employees directly in the attack at close range, and then the floating batteries attacked, under the orders of General Ventura Moreno Zavala, supported with the fires of his ships from this unfortunate attack of the invention of the French d'Arçon. When these were set ablaze by the heated bullets of the British defenders, he sent his smaller boats to put out the fires and save their crews. In the fires and blasts of these heavy batteries, theoretically unsinkable and incombustible, with water circulating "like blood through the human body", there were 338 dead, 638 wounded, 80 drowned and 335 prisoners. The effects were far outweighed by the bombardment of the gunboats invented by Barceló, which made it effective.

He continued the blockade of Gibraltar, which was defended by Governor Elliot. The ships remained at sea and only took refuge in Algeciras during hard times. The situation in Gibraltar became very tight, so the British decided to send a large convoy, escorted by a force of 30 ships under the command of Admiral Richard Howe. The British entered the Mediterranean after making their way through a storm from the southwest and Córdova came out to meet them, but Howe took advantage of the storm and managed to bring the convoy ships with the much-awaited resources into Gibraltar, without Córdova being able to prevent it. In the storm, the Spanish ship of the line San Miguel was captured, thrown by the storm under the very walls of Gibraltar, and other Spanish ships suffered many damage.

When Lord Howe was returning to the Atlantic, Córdoba again met him and on October 20, 1782, the Battle of Cape Spartel occurred. The British admired "the Spanish way of maneuvering, their ready line of battle, the swift positioning of the flagship in the center of the force and the opportunity with which the rear guard forced the sail, shortening the distances." After five hours of indecisive combat, Howe's 34 ships of the line, outnumbered by the 46 Franco-Spanish ships of the line, disengaged, ending the battle. The Spanish warship Santísima Trinidad was able to completely discharge all of its batteries.

Peace was signed with Great Britain on January 30, 1783, by which the island of Menorca and Florida were restored to Spain. The king rewarded the services of Córdoba by appointing him general director of the Navy on February 7, 1783 and shortly afterwards captain general. Córdova lowered his insignia of the combined squad the following May 1. On July 2, 1786, he laid the first stone of the Pantheon of Illustrious Sailors of the Island of León (today San Fernando), the town where he died on July 29, 1796, at the age of 90, being buried in the church of San Francisco of said locality. In 1851 the transfer of his remains to the Pantheon of Illustrious Sailors was decreed, which was fulfilled in 1870.

== Offspring ==
Luis de Córdova y Córdova, married to María Andrea de Romay, had a son, Antonio de Córdova y Romay, who also entered the Navy and died in 1782 after having reached the rank of brigadier.

== Other honors ==
=== Eponymy ===
- Cordova (Alaska): named in 1790, by the Spanish explorer Salvador Fidalgo.

== See ==
- Capture of the English double convoy (1780)

== Bibliography ==
1. González de Canales, Fernando. Catalog of Paintings of the Naval Museum. Volume II. Ministry of Defence. Madrid, 2000. pp. 178–179.
2. Martínez-Valverde and Martínez, Carlos. General Encyclopedia of the Sea. Garriga, 1957.
3. Peña Blanco, Joaquín Guillermo. The Royal Navy against the Royal Navy. The Spanish Navy on the European front for the independence of the United States. (2020) Alicante: Editorial EAS
