= HMS Thetis (1773) =

Frigate of the Royal Navy

History

Great Britain
- Name: HMS Thetis
- Namesake: Thetis
- Ordered: 25 December 1770
- Builder: Wyatt & Co. Buckler's Hard
- Laid down: 1771
- Launched: 1773
- Commissioned: 1777
- Out of service: 1781
- Fate: Wrecked 1780

General characteristics as built
- Class & type: 32-gun fifth-rate Amazon-class frigate (1773) frigate
- Length: 126 ft 3 in (38.48 m) (gundeck); 104 ft 1 in (31.72 m) (keel)
- Beam: 35 ft 1.75 in (10.7125 m)
- Draught: 8 ft 4 in (2.54 m) (forwards); 13 ft 0 in (3.96 m) (aft)
- Depth of hold: 12 ft 2 in (3.71 m)
- Sail plan: Full-rigged ship
- Complement: 220
- Armament: Upper deck: 26 × 12-pounder guns; QD: 4 × 6-pounder guns + 4 × 18-pounder carronades; Fc: 2 × 6-pounder guns + 2 × 18-pounder carronades

HMS Thetis was a 32-gun fifth-rate frigate of the Royal Navy, built by Wyatt & Co. at Buckler's Hard shipyard in 1773.

From 1777 to 1781 she served with the North American squadron. In January, 1778 she was under the command of Captain John Gell.

Thetis took part in the action of 9 August 1780, when a convoy she was escorting fell prey to a Franco-Spanish squadron. 55 merchantmen were captured, but she managed to escape.

In 1780, she was wrecked.
