= Aigle-class frigate =

Frigate class of the Royal Navy

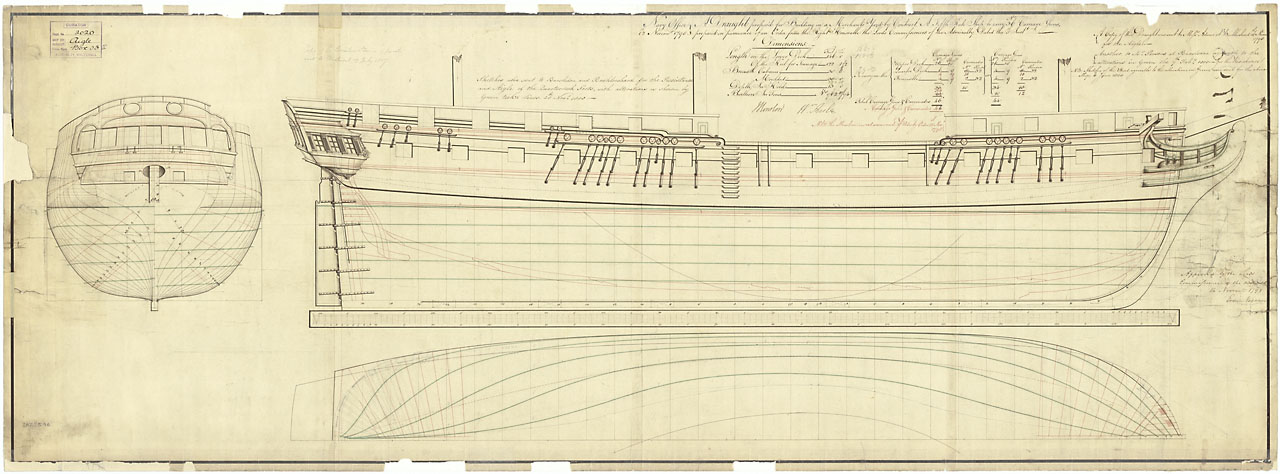
- Lines of the Aigle class

Class overview
- Name: Aigle class
- Operators: Royal Navy
- Preceded by: Apollo class
- Succeeded by: HMS Ethalion
- Built: 1798–1801
- In commission: 1801–1845
- Planned: 2
- Completed: 2
- Lost: 1

General characteristics
- Type: Fifth-rate frigate
- Tons burthen: 962 81/94 (bm)
- Length: 146 ft (44.5 m) (gundeck); 122 ft 1 1/2 in (37.2 m) (keel)
- Beam: 38 ft 6 in (11.7 m)
- Depth of hold: 13 ft (4 m)
- Sail plan: Full-rigged ship
- Complement: 264
- Armament: Gundeck: 26 × 18-pounder guns; QD: 4 × 9-pounder guns + 8 × 32-pounder carronades; Fc: 4 × 9-pounder guns + 2 × 32-pounder carronades

Aigle-class frigates were 36-gun sailing frigates of the fifth rate designed by Surveyor of the Navy, Sir John Henslow for the Royal Navy. Only two were built: HMS Aigle and HMS Resistance. Aigle was ordered first on 15 September 1798 but a 16-month delay during her construction meant that Resistance was completed and launched first on 29 April 1801.

== Background ==
Frigates of the period were three-masted, full-rigged ships that carried their main battery on a single, continuous gun deck. They were smaller and faster than ships of the line and primarily intended for raiding, reconnaissance and messaging. Since late 1778, those of 36 or 38 guns with a main armament of 18-pounder long guns, had become the standard in the Royal Navy and by 1793, when the French Revolutionary War began, it was not unusual for them to be close to 1000 tons burthen (bm).

== Design and construction ==
The Aigle-class frigates were 36-gun sailing frigates of the fifth rate designed by Surveyor of the Navy, Sir John Henslow in 1798 for the Royal Navy. Henslow's designs were not wildly innovative and tended towards small modifications on established frigate classes; his alterations being primarily to the size and, in particular, length of ships. British frigate designs were frequently lengthened during this period so that they could reach sailing speeds comparable to French frigates and the Aigle class followed this trend.

As designed, the Aigle-class was 962 81/94 tons (bm); 146 feet 0 inches (44.5 metres) along the gun deck, 122 ft 1 1/2 in (37.2 m) at the keel, with a beam of 38 ft 6 in (11.7 m) and a depth in the hold of 13 ft (4.0 m). Close in dimensions and armament to Henslow's 1797 Penelope class, the Aigle class did not have the same shallow depth in the hold and were known for being "very roomy". The ships would carry a complement of 264 men when fully manned.

A sailing report from 15 August 1815, noted that Aigle was "...similar to Apollo, being fast and weatherly, manoeuvrable and a good sea-boat". It also recorded her as making 10 knots (12 mph; 19 km/h) close-hauled under topgallants but with her best performance of 12 knots (14 mph; 22 km/h) with the wind coming over the stern quarter. According to naval historian Robert Gardiner, the tendency to design longer frigates ended with the Aigle class. He notes however that they were not the fastest of their type, being outsailed by the Apollo class for example, which had been designed by William Rule at around the same time and were "generally similar".

=== Armament ===
Although classed as 36-gun fifth rates, (Note: The gun-rating of a vessel was the number of long guns it was designed to carry and did not always match its actual armament. Before 1817, carronades were not counted at all unless they were direct replacements for long guns.) the Aigle-class frigates would be armed with a main battery of twenty-six 18 pounders (8.2 kilograms) on the gun deck, four 9 pdr (4.1 kg) on the quarterdeck and four on the forecastle. They would also carry ten 32 pdr (14.5 kg) carronades, short lightweight guns with a large bore. They were cheaper to produce and much easier to handle than the equivalent long gun but lacked the accuracy and range. Eight would be carried on the quarterdeck and two on the forecastle. (Note: On 17 June 1799, an Admiralty Order saw two of the 9-pounder guns on the quarterdeck and forecastle replaced by more 32-pounder carronades, necessitating the widening of the gunports to accept the larger guns. The order was reversed on 15 October 1801.)

== Comparisons ==
	HMS Aigle	HMS Resistance
Ordered	15 September 1798	28 January 1800
Laid down	November 1798	March 1800
Launched	23 September 1801	29 April 1801
Length (gundeck)	146 ft 2 in (44.6 m)	146 ft 1 1/4 in (44.5 m)
Length (keel)	122 ft 1 in (37.2 m)	122 ft 1 in (37.2 m)
Beam	38 ft 8 in (11.8 m)	38 ft 9 in (11.8 m)
Depth in hold	13 ft 0 in (4 m)	13 ft 0 1/2 in (4 m)
Tons burthen (BM)	970 84/94	975 8/94

Only two Aigle-class frigates were built: HMS Aigle and HMS Resistance. Aigle was ordered first but a 16-month delay during her construction meant that Resistance was completed and launched first, (Note: The First Lord of the Admiralty, Lord St Vincent, was untrusting of civilian shipyards and Parsons was one of very few such shipwrights to continue receiving orders for Royal Navy vessels. In reward for completing and launching Resistance on schedule he was given the order for the 36-gun frigate HMS Tribune by comparison Balthazar and Edward Adams were fined £1000 for unacceptable delays.) and due to timber's propensity to expand and contract was slightly larger when measured at 975 8/94.

Built under contract by Balthazar and Edward Adams, Aigle was ordered on 15 September 1798 and her keel was laid down in November at Bucklers Hard shipyard in Hampshire. Launched on 23 September 1801, her dimensions were: 146 feet 2 inches (44.6 metres) along the gun deck, 122 ft 1 in (37.2 m) at the keel, with a beam of 38 ft 8 in (11.8 m) and a depth in the hold of 13 ft (4.0 m). This made her 970 84/94 tons (bm). Aigle drew between 17 ft (5.18 m) at the bow and 19 ft 4 in (5.89 m) at the stern.

Resistance was ordered on 28 January 1800 to be built at Bursledon by the shipwright George Parsons. Laid down in March of the same year, Resistance was launched on 29 April 1801 with the following dimensions: 146 feet 1 1/4 inches (44.5 m) along the upper deck and 122 feet 1 inch (37.2 m) along the keel, with a beam of 38 feet 9 inches (11.8 m) and a depth in the hold of 13 feet 0 1/2 inch (4 m). The ship had a draught of 10 feet 5 inches (3.2 m) forward and 15 feet 7 inches (4.7 m) aft, and measured 9758/94 tons burthen. The fitting out process was completed at Portsmouth Dockyard on 21 June.

In accordance with Surveyor of the Navy Sir Robert Seppings' designs, in January 1820, Aigle had her square transom removed and a circular stern fitted. This gave her improved protection in the rear and allowed a better field of fire. She was subsequently laid up once more, then repaired and converted to a sixth-rate 24-gun corvette of 990 tons burthen, at Chatham Dockyard between March and July 1831.

== In service ==
=== Aigle ===
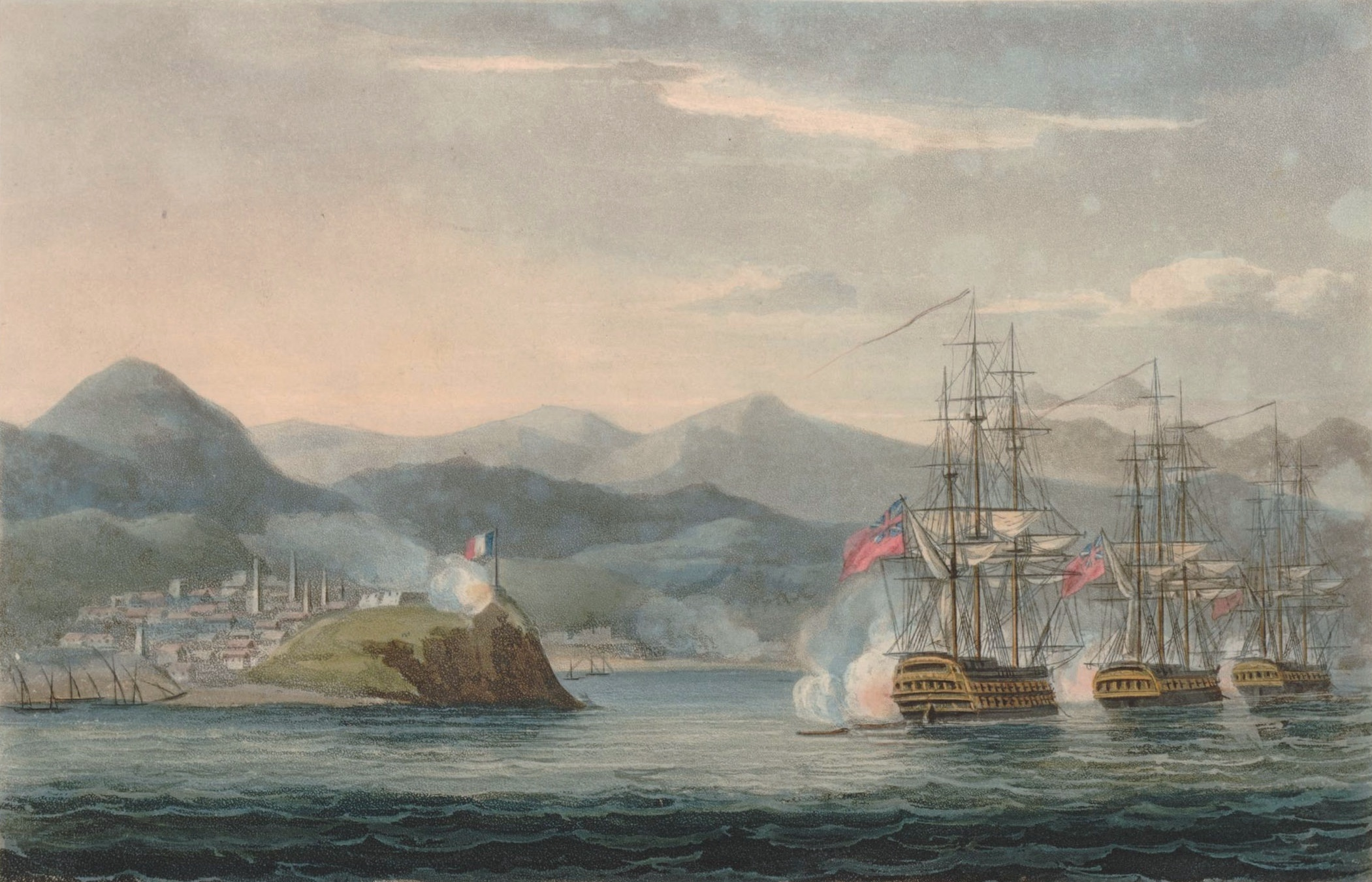
Pembroke, Alcmene and Aigle bombarding Fort Maurizio on 11 April 1814

Much of Aigle's career as a frigate was spent trying to keep the English Channel free of enemy warships and merchant vessels. She was first commissioned under Captain George Wolfe in December 1802 and completed for sea service on 24 March 1803. On 12 July, Aigle destroyed two French naval vessels, the ship-rigged Charente of 20 guns and the 8-gun brig Joie, after forcing them aground. On 22 March 1808, she was first into the action against two large French frigates, compelling one to seek the shelter of the Île de Groix batteries and chasing the other onto the shore.

Aigle was at the Battle of Basque Roads in April 1809, when Captain Thomas Cochrane's partially successful action began with an attacking force of fireships against a French fleet, anchored off the Île-d'Aix. Initially providing support to the fireships' crews, Aigle went on to help force the surrender of the stranded French vessels Ville de Varsovie and Aquilon. In July 1809, Aigle took part in the Walcheren Campaign, an amphibious operation against the Kingdom of Holland, carrying out a two-day long bombardment of Flushing that led to its capitulation on 15 August.

In October 1811, Aigle was sent to the Mediterranean, under Captain Sir John Louis, where she and her crew raided the island of Elba. Under the command of Captain Sir James Brisbane, bombarded Fort Maurizio until its guns were silenced so her crew could collect the prizes she had previously chased ashore. She later provide naval support during the invasion and occupation of the city of Genoa. Converted to a corvette in 1831, she returned to the Mediterranean under Lord Clarence Paget. In 1852, she became a coal hulk and receiving ship before being used as a target for torpedoes and sold for breaking in 1870.

=== Resistance ===
Resistance, like Aigle spent much of her time in the English Channel. She was first commissioned by Captain Henry Digby for the Channel Fleet in May 1801. In August, she escorted a convoy to Quebec, capturing the French privateer Elizabeth on the way, reputedly the last prize of the French Revolutionary War, and returned to duty in the Channel towards the end of the year. Recommissioned under Captain Philip Wodehouse in 1803, she left for the Mediterranean but never arrived, being wrecked off Cape St. Vincent on 31 May. Her crew however, survived.
