= Henry Duncan =

Henry Duncan may refer to:

- Henry Duncan (minister) (1774–1846), Scottish minister, geologist and social reformer; founder of the savings bank movement
- Henry Duncan (Royal Navy officer, born 1735) (1735–1814), naval captain and deputy comptroller of the Royal Navy
- Sir Henry Duncan (Royal Navy officer, born 1786) (1786–1835), Scottish sailor

== See also ==
- James Henry Duncan (disambiguation)
