= John Nicholson Inglefield =

Royal Navy officer

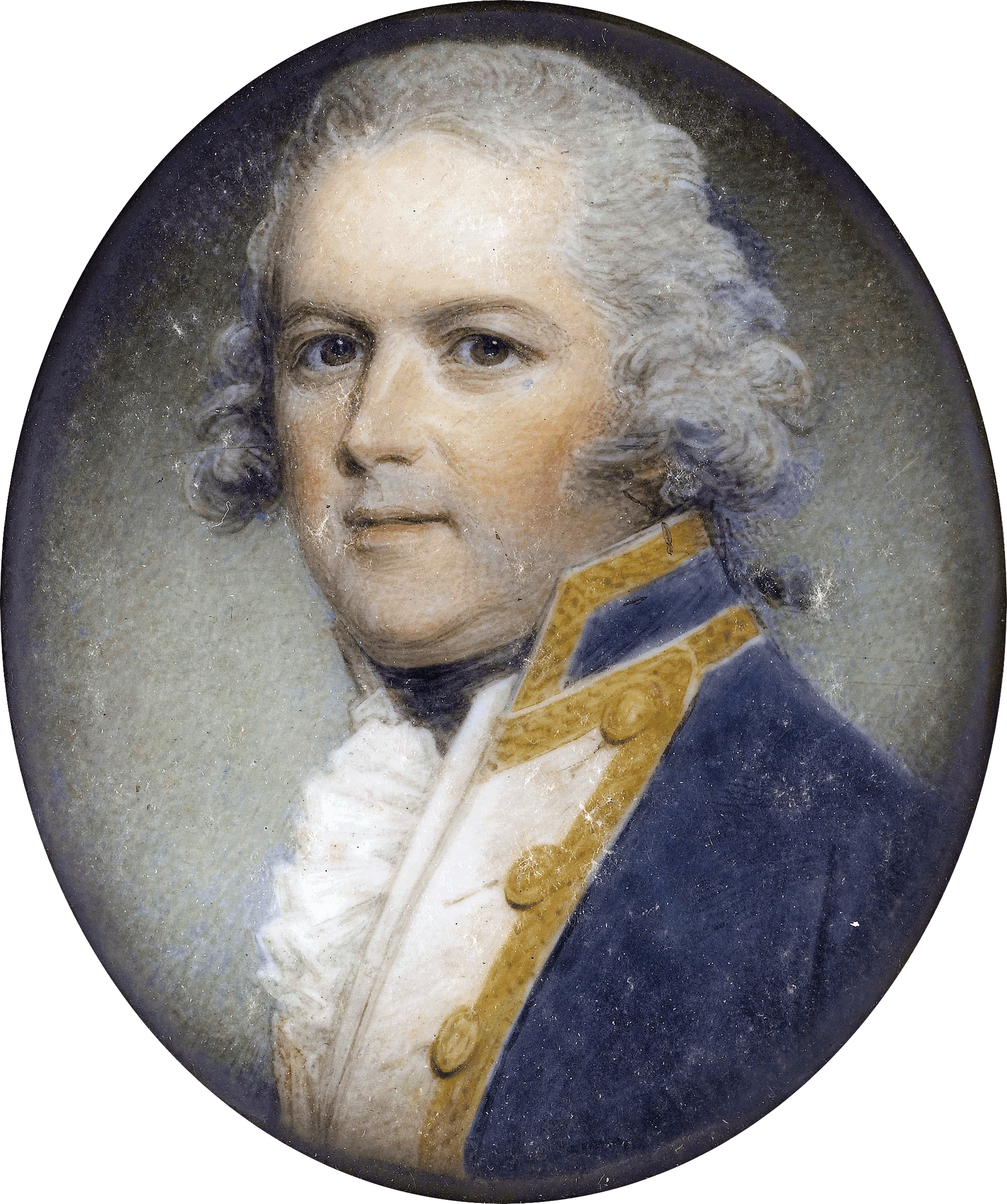
Miniature portrait of Inglefield

Captain John Nicholson Inglefield (1748 – 7 February 1828) was a Royal Navy officer.

== Life ==
John Nicholson Inglefield was the son of a ship's carpenter, Isaac Inglefield, and his wife, a sister of the ship designer Thomas Slade – later Sir Thomas Slade. According to Captain Inglefield himself, his paternal family was of Lancashire origin and distantly connected to that of the Englefields.

Under the patronage of his maternal uncle, Thomas Slade, Inglefield joined the navy as a boy of 11 in 1759. In April 1766, he was rated able seaman aboard the Launceston: in May 1768, he was made lieutenant and moved into HMS Romney under the command of Sir Samuel Hood. This connection was to prove the most significant of Inglefield's career. Although Inglefield returned to the Launceston in October, by July 1769, he was back with Hood aboard the Romney and from that time forward his career was closely associated with his friend's. With him Inglefield left the Romney in December 1770, served in HMS Marlborough and HMS Courageux, and in 1778, in HMS Robust with Hood's brother Alexander. Aboard the Robust, he was present at the First Battle of Ushant on 27 July.

On 27 December 1773, at Baughurst, Hampshire, Inglefield married Ann Smith, daughter of a gentleman of Greenwich named Robert Smith. They had three daughters and one son, Samuel Hood Inglefield, who also went on to a distinguished naval career and was the father of Edward Augustus Inglefield. In June 1779, Inglefield was promoted to command of the brig-sloop HMS Lively and in the October of the following year was promoted to post captain and posted to HMS Barfleur of 90 guns, in which his patron, Sir Samuel Hood, hoisted his flag. As captain of the flagship, Inglefield sailed to the West Indies and took part in the skirmish with the French fleet off Martinique in 1781. In August of the same year, Hood transferred him to HMS Centaur (74 guns), which Inglefield commanded in three actions against the French, culminating on 12 April 1782, at the Battle of the Saintes.

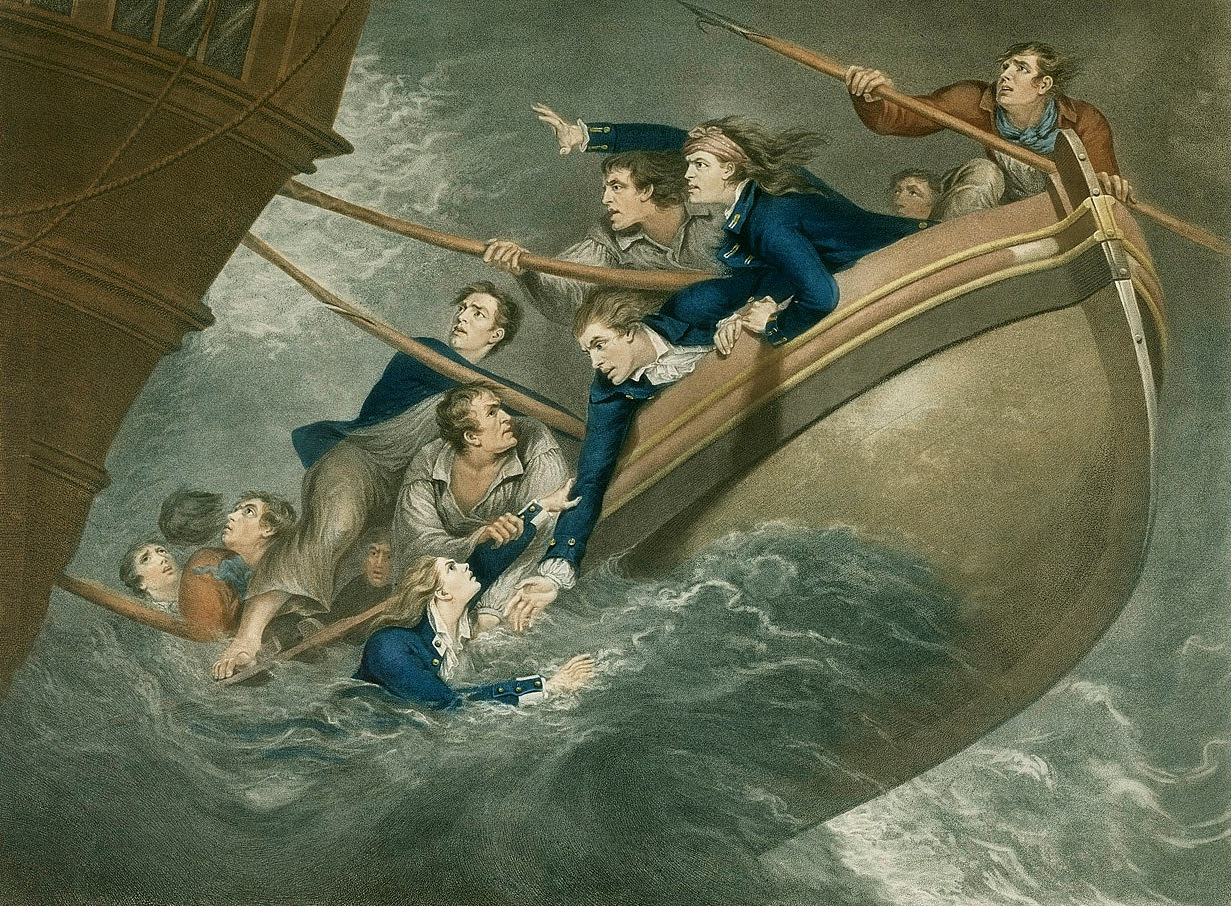
Inglefield and 11 other men escaping from Centaur, by James Northcote

It was however aboard the Centaur that Inglefield suffered the most harrowing episode of his career when, sailing for England with the convoy under Rear-Admiral Sir Thomas Graves, his ship along with the others was struck by a hurricane. The Centaur, an ageing ship, was severely damaged. Thrown upon her beam ends, dismasted in order to right herself and with her rudder gone, she eventually foundered despite the most strenuous efforts of Inglefield and the crew over several days. Inglefield and eleven others escaped aboard the pinnace, though otherwise the ship's complement of some six hundred men was lost.

Subsisting on a few bottles of French cordials, some spoilt bread, ship's biscuit and rainwater wrung out into a bailing cup, the survivors successfully navigated to Faial Island in the Azores after 16 days of the most terrible privation that saw one of them, Thomas Matthews, die the day before they reached land. On returning to England and the court martial usual in such cases, the survivors were acquitted. Inglefield's spare and unsensational description of this disaster, Captain Inglefield's narrative concerning the loss of the 'Centaur' was published shortly afterwards. A dramatic painting of the incident in which those on the pinnace, thrusting off from the foundering Centaur, pulled aboard a 15-year-old midshipman who had thrown himself from the wreck, was later made into a popular print.

For three years Inglefield was given a home posting aboard the guardship HMS Scipio in the Medway. In 1786, however, he and his wife were publicly involved in a marital dispute which led to a permanent breach. After accusing his wife of making advances towards a manservant, Inglefield demanded a separation. Denying the accusation, Mrs Inglefield sued him for desertion. Although she won her case in court, the marriage was irretrievably damaged and they appear never to have cohabited again.

In 1788, Inglefield was posted to HMS Adventure (44 guns) which, joined later by HMS Medusa (44 guns), also under his command, patrolled the West Coast of Africa. In 1792, he served as one of the judges at the court-martial of the mutineers from HMS Bounty, who had been captured on Tahiti. In 1793, he was serving in the Mediterranean aboard the frigate HMS Aigle (36 guns), and in 1794, was appointed captain of the fleet – chief of staff to the commander-in-chief. Towards the end of 1794 he returned to England with Samuel, now Viscount, Hood and was thereafter a resident commissioner of the Navy Board, serving in Corsica, Malta, Gibraltar and Halifax, Nova Scotia. A commissioner's post was considered equivalent to the rank of rear admiral, but was only given to officers who had ended their active service. In 1799, he was placed on the list of retired captains.

He died in Greenwich before 7 February 1828, when his will was proved. In his will he bequeathed his estate of some £8,300, apart from three annuities to relatives, to his two surviving children, Samuel Hood Inglefield and Lady Ann Hallowell Carew, wife of Sir Benjamin Hallowell Carew.

Military offices
Preceded by Henry Duncan	Resident Commissioner, Halifax; 1803–1812	Succeeded by Philip Wodehouse
