= Sir Isaac Coffin, 1st Baronet =

Royal Navy Admiral (1759–1839)

Admiral Sir Isaac Coffin Bt GCH
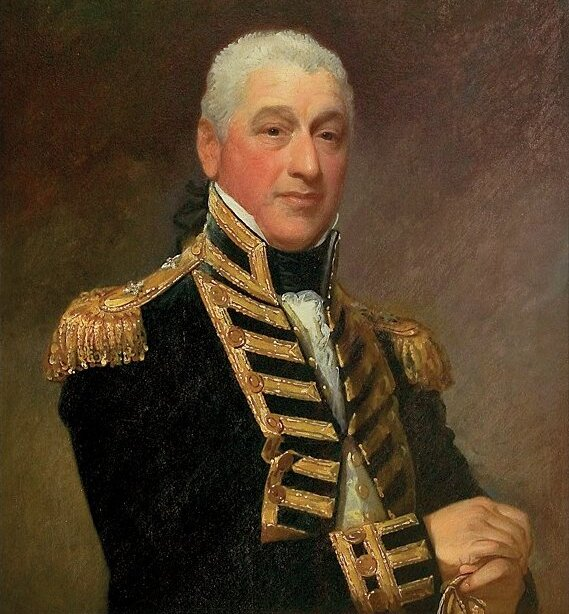
- Admiral Sir Isaac Coffin by Gilbert Stuart, c. 1810
- Born: 16 May 1759; Boston, Province of Massachusetts Bay, British America
- Died: 23 July 1839 (aged 80)
- Burial place: Cheltenham, Gloucestershire, England
- Military career
- Allegiance: United Kingdom of Great Britain and Ireland
- Branch: Royal Navy
- Service years: 1773–1839
- Rank: Admiral
- Commands: HMS Avenger; HMS Pacahunter; HMS Shrewsbury; HMS Hydra; HMS Thisbe; HMS Alligator; HMS Melampus
- Conflicts: American Revolutionary War; Battle of Cape Henry; Battle of St. Kitts; French Revolutionary Wars; Napoleonic Wars

Admiral Sir Isaac Coffin, 1st Baronet, GCH (also Coffin-Greenly; 16 May 1759 – 23 July 1839) was an officer of the Royal Navy who served during the American War of Independence and the French Revolutionary and Napoleonic Wars.

Coffin was born in Boston and served in the navy on a number of ships during the War of Independence. He fought at Cape Henry with Arbuthnot and at St. Kitts with Hood, eventually being promoted to command a number of small ships on the American coast. Despite his rise through the ranks, he clashed occasionally with the naval hierarchy, with the first incident occurring while still a newly commissioned commander aboard HMS Shrewsbury. An incident over unqualified lieutenants led to his court-martial, though he was acquitted. A more serious incident occurred after the end of the war with America, when Coffin was particularly active off the Canadian coast. A charge was brought of issuing false musters, and though the practice was endemic in the navy, led to his dismissal from the ship. The First Lord of the Admiralty, Lord Howe, then intervened to have him dismissed from the Royal Navy entirely, a decision that was later overturned by an inquiry, which set an important precedent. Restored to his rank, Coffin commanded several ships during the opening years of the wars with France, but the recurrence of an old injury forced him to move ashore. He spent the rest of the war commanding a number of dockyards, continuing to rise through the ranks, and being created a baronet for his good service. Retiring from active naval service towards the end of the Napoleonic Wars Coffin briefly changed his surname to Coffin-Greenly before reverting it, entered politics, and died with the rank of admiral in 1839.

== Family and early life ==
Isaac Coffin was born in Boston, Province of Massachusetts Bay, on 16 May 1759, into what would prove to be a strong American Loyalist family. He was the fourth and youngest son of the paymaster of the customs in the port, Nathaniel Coffin. His father descended from Tristram Coffin, who immigrated to Massachusetts from Devon in 1642. His mother was Elizabeth, the daughter of the merchant Henry Barnes, of Boston. He attended the Boston Latin School. He first appeared on the books of the 74-gun HMS Captain as an able seaman in October 1771, while Captain was at Boston under the command of Captain Thomas Symonds, and is recorded as having transferred to the brig HMS Gaspée under Lieutenant William Hunter at Rhode Island in May 1773. However it is more likely that he did not enter the service until October 1773, joining George Montagu, captain of HMS Kingfisher. Montagu was the son of Rear-Admiral John Montagu, then commander in chief on the North American station. He later followed George Montagu aboard HMS Fowey.

Coffin was commissioned lieutenant on 18 August 1776 while serving aboard the brig HMS Diligent under Lieutenant Edmund Dod at Halifax, but was not able to take up the rank immediately. Instead he joined the 50-gun HMS Romney as a midshipman in September 1776, the Romney then being at Newfoundland. In June 1778 he moved aboard the 50-gun HMS Europa, still as a midshipman. He finally received a posting as a lieutenant in October 1778, aboard the cutter Placentia. He briefly served as a volunteer aboard Captain Thomas Pasley's ship HMS Sibyl, and from there moved in June 1779 to the armed ship Pincon, serving on the Labrador coast. The Pincon was wrecked in August 1779, and in November he was moved aboard the 50-gun HMS Adamant under Captain Gideon Johnstone as her second lieutenant. The Adamant was then being completed at Liverpool, with Coffin helping to oversee work. He was involved in a number of accidents during the final phases of work, but was able to get her ready to sail to Plymouth under a jury-rig by June 1780. He went out with Adamant to North America the following month as a convoy escort, and in February 1781 transferred to the 90-gun HMS London, flagship of Rear-Admiral Sir Thomas Graves. Coffin's time aboard London was brief, and in March he moved aboard the 74-gun HMS Royal Oak, under Captain Swiney. Royal Oak was the flagship of Vice-Admiral Mariot Arbuthnot at the Battle of Cape Henry on 16 March, and Coffin acted as Arbuthnot's signal lieutenant.

== Commands ==
Royal Oak then returned to New York, but ran aground while passing from the North to the East River, and was badly damaged. She had to sail to Halifax for repairs, after which Arbuthnot returned to England. Royal Oak set sail to return New York in July, joining the fleet, now under Admiral Graves, on her journey. Here Coffin received news of his promotion to master and commander on 3 July, and on arriving in New York, took command of the sloop HMS Avenger. He was initially based in the North River, but in December he exchanged ships with Alexander Cochrane and took command of the 14-gun sloop Pacahunter. While aboard Pacahunter he was present during a great fire in St. John's, and helped to fight it, a service that earned him the thanks of the House of Assembly.

His service aboard her was shortlived, for he and the entire ship's company volunteered to join Rear-Admiral Samuel Hood's flagship, the 90-gun HMS Barfleur. Coffin was present at Hood's attack on the French fleet under the Comte de Grasse at Basseterre, the Battle of St. Kitts, on 25 January 1782. Coffin then went on to Antigua to join his ship, travelling aboard Captain Hugh Cloberry Christian's HMS Fortunee, and in company with a frigate under Captain Henry Harvey. During the voyage the two ships ran into the French ship of the line Triomphant and the frigate Braave. The French fired upon the smaller British ships, but the latter were able to escape and arrived safely at St. John's. Coffin then went on to Jamaica where his friendship with Hood led to his promotion to post-captain on 13 June 1782 and an appointment to command the 74-gun HMS Shrewsbury.

== Clash with Rodney ==
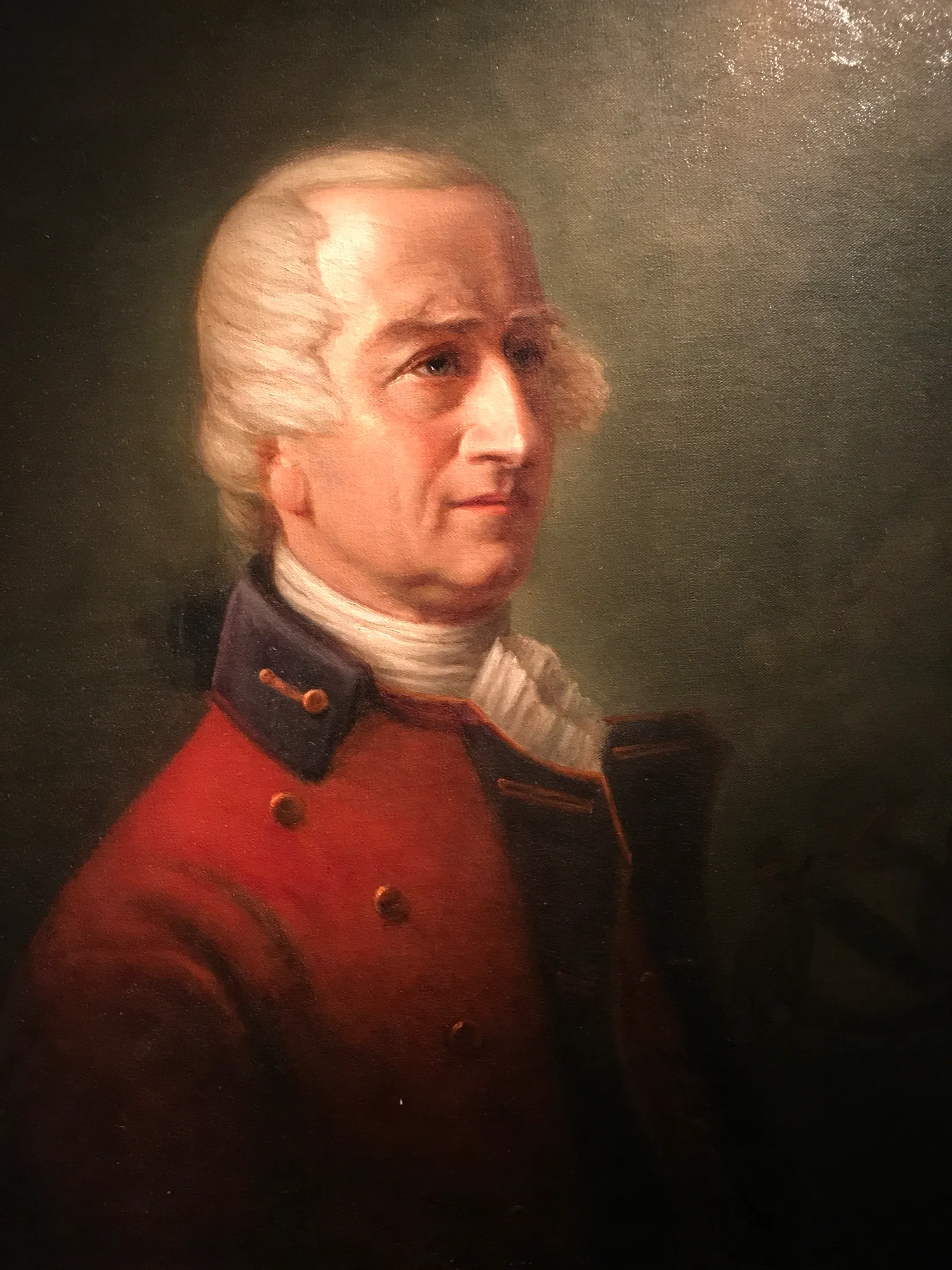
Guy Carleton, 1st Baron Dorchester. Coffin transported him and his family to and from Quebec, but his musters of Dorchester's sons nearly caused his downfall.

It was while commanding Shrewsbury at Jamaica that Coffin had the first of a number of run-ins with naval authority that was to mark his career. The commander of the fleet, Admiral George Brydges Rodney, ordered Coffin to take three lieutenants with insufficient sea time. Coffin refused, apparently unaware that the order had come from Rodney himself, arguing that as the boys had respectively only five, three and two years service, they were unqualified to serve as lieutenants. On learning that it was Rodney's express wish that the boys be taken on as lieutenants, Coffin grudgingly acceded, but Rodney came to hear of Coffin's initial refusal, and had him court-martialed on charges of disobedience and contempt. The trial was held at Port Royal on 29 July, with Coffin being acquitted of both charges, the court determining that 'the appointment of these officers by commission was irregular and contrary to the established rules of the service.' Despite the verdict, the court did not have the power to suspend appointments made by the commander in chief, and Coffin was forced to write to the Admiralty on 20 September 1782, requesting the lieutenants' commissions be suspended. The Admiralty issued the recall of the commissions on 14 December, by which time Coffin had moved from Shrewsbury to take command of the 20-gun HMS Hydra. Coffin sailed Hydra back to England and paid her off in March 1783.

== Thisbe and the Magdalen Islands ==
Coffin was left temporarily unemployed after the end of the American War of Independence, and spent some of his time in France, where he studied the French language. He returned to service in May 1786 with an appointment to command the 28-gun HMS Thisbe. He was ordered to transport Lord Dorchester and his family to Quebec, and departed the Scilly Isles for the voyage across the Atlantic on 9 September. He arrived at the Gulf of Saint Lawrence on 10 October, and anchored at Quebec on 23 October. Coffin sailed for Halifax two days after arriving, reaching the port on 9 November, and spending the winter there. In 1787 he moved to operate in the Gulf of Saint Lawrence and took a particular interest in the Magdalen Islands. He warned the governor's council that New Englanders were exploiting the fisheries in the gulf and were trading illegally with the inhabitants of the islands. Coffin, an American loyalist who had been deprived of his patrimony by the outcome of the War of Independence, was granted the islands in 1798 for his good service. His attempts to attract settlers or evict the squatters who had arrived from Saint Pierre and Miquelon were however unsuccessful. In an effort to exercise authority on his property Coffin had 1 Penny tokens made at Birmingham, England in 1815. The British government felt this was overstepping his authority and revoked his grant of the island. His long association with his estates in Canada, and his business there led to one of his obituaries noting that by the time of his death 'he had crossed the Atlantic, on service or pleasure, no less than thirty times.'

== Dismissal from the service ==
While at Halifax with Thisbe, Coffin entered four boys, including two of Lord Dorchester's sons, onto the ship's books as captain's servants. The boys did not serve on the ship, and were probably still at school. Though technically prohibited, the practice of entering boys onto ships' books as a means of giving them false sea time, was widespread throughout the service, and many naval officers began their careers in this manner. Coffin was accused of knowingly signing false musters, and brought to trial by court-martial. The charge was maliciously motivated, but the court was compelled to examine the evidence. Coffin was tried aboard HMS Dido and the offence was proven. The offence technically required the defendant to be dismissed from the service, but considering the mitigating circumstances, the malicious nature of the charge and the fact that the practice was common in the navy, the court merely sentenced him to be dismissed from his ship.

Coffin returned to Britain, whereupon the sentence came to the attention of the First Lord of the Admiralty, Lord Howe, who insisted that the full punishment required by the 31st Article of War be carried out. Coffin was duly dismissed from the navy, though he lodged an appeal against the decision. In the meantime Coffin emigrated to Flanders and travelled as a mercenary throughout Denmark, Sweden and Russia, in search of a commission. Meanwhile Coffin's case was considered by the judges of the admiralty, on the question of whether the Admiralty had the right to set aside the judgement of a court-martial. After considering the case, they recorded that though the judgement reached in the original court-martial had not been legal, ' ... the punishment directed to be inflicted ... upon persons convicted of the offence specified in the 31st Article of War ... cannot be inflicted, or judgement thereupon be pronounced, or supplied by any other authority than that of the Court Martial which tried the offender.' In other words, Howe's decision to overrule the sentence imposed by the original court-martial was ruled invalid, and Coffin was reinstated in the service, with the payment of arrears in his wages. The judgement defined the limits of Admiralty interference with courts-martial, and became a frequently cited precedent.

== Return to service, and French Revolutionary Wars ==
Coffin returned to active service during the Spanish Armament, taking command of the sixth rate HMS Alligator in 1790. At one point Alligator was anchored at the Nore when one of her sailors fell overboard. Coffin jumped into the water to rescue him, and succeeded in recovering the man before he drowned. Coffin experienced a serious rupture while carrying out the rescue, that would dog him in later life. From the Nore he moved to Spithead, and then to Ceuta, where Alligator briefly carried the flag of Admiral Philip Cosby. Superseded by the arrival of HMS Fame, Alligator was sent to cruise off Western Ireland. In 1792 Coffin returned to Canada, this time to bring Lord Dorchester home. Alligator was then paid off, and Coffin, finding himself temporarily unemployed, took the opportunity to tour parts of the continent.

The outbreak of the French Revolutionary Wars in 1793 led to Coffin returning to service in command of the 36-gun HMS Melampus. He was initially ordered to take Lord Dorchester back to Canada, but the order was later cancelled, and Coffin was compelled to transfer most of his crew to HMS Severn, and then re-man Melampus. Having done so, he transported armaments and stores to Guernsey in preparation for the expedition under the Earl of Moira. He was then assigned to operate in the English Channel, departing Spithead in company with HMS Active to join Sir James Wallace. While sailing down the Channel the two British ships encountered a French squadron consisted of five frigates, a corvette and a cutter. The British ships were able to outmanoeuvre the French, and escaped. It was about this time that Coffin began to feel the effects of his rupture, and after over-exerting himself one night, was taken seriously ill and obliged to quit his ship. For the next four months he was virtually crippled, and never again had a seagoing command.

== Dockyard service ==
Coffin was appointed regulating captain at Leith in Spring 1795, and in October that year took up the post of resident commissioner of the navy at Corsica. His business took him at times to Naples, Florence and Leghorn, and after the British evacuation of the island in 1796 he went from Elba to Lisbon, where he remained for two years. Coffin was next appointed to serve as the Navy Boards resident navy commissioner at Port Mahon Dockyard, Menorca in 1798, followed by the offer of the post at Sheerness. He went out to Halifax Dockyard as its resident commissioner for six months prior to returning and taking up the post of Resident Commissioner of the Navy at Sheerness Dockyard. Both here and at Halifax Coffin seems to have acted under the belief, strongly expressed at the time by Admiral the Earl of St Vincent, that the yard officers were corrupt. Jervis was a strong proponent of the reform of the civil administration of the navy, and Coffin acted to forcefully impose Admiralty regulations. In this he was perhaps influenced by his own experiences with Admiralty law and the rigid hierarchy within the navy, but managed to undermine the efficiency of the dockyards with his overzealous application of the regulations. He was heavily criticised at a local level, but retained Jervis's confidence, and was promoted to rear-admiral on 23 April 1804. He so upset the dock workers that a threatening letter was sent after he ordered a worker to be pressed into the navy for insolence, eventually forcing him to reverse his decision. His reputation as an effective and energetic commissioner earned him the honour of being created a baronet "of the Magdelaine Islands in the Gulph [sic] of St. Lawrence, British North America" on 19 May that year, which was followed by being created admiral-superintendent at Portsmouth Dockyard. He remained at Portsmouth until being promoted to vice-admiral on 28 April 1808, at which point he retired.

== Family and later life ==
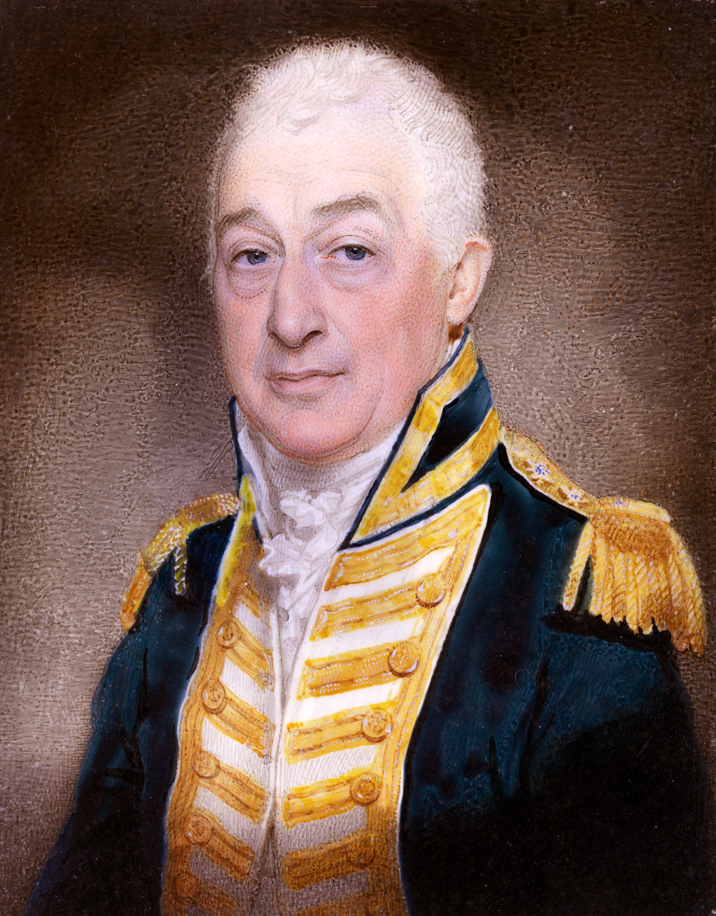
Sir Isaac Coffin (1759–1839), Admiral of the Blue, by an unknown artist

Coffin started a family during his retirement, marrying Elizabeth Browne Greenly at Titley on 3 April 1811. Elizabeth was the heiress of William Greenly, and Isaac briefly changed his surname to Coffin-Greenly on 11 February 1811, but reverted to Coffin on 13 March 1813. He was advanced to full admiral on 4 June 1814 and entered politics, being elected as Member of Parliament for Ilchester in 1818, and holding the seat until 1826. Greville recorded the result of one Parliamentary debate soon after his election:

The Opposition were very angry with Sir I.Coffin, who, with the candour of a novice, had made himself informed of the facts of the petition, and finding they were against his friends, said so in the House.

Coffin was created a Knight Grand Cross of the Royal Guelphic Order in 1832. He was a personal friend of Lord Nelson, at whose 1805 funeral he was a pallbearer. He was also a friend of the Duke of Clarence (later William IV), and during the 1832 reform crisis was placed on the King's private list of those to be made peers. However, several Government ministers opposed his appointment on the grounds of his close association with his American relatives, and his name was dropped from the list. Coffin was a noted patron of charities, and a few weeks before his death donated a hundred pounds to the Royal Naval Charity, with the note that he did so 'fearful I might suddenly slip my wind, and in the hurry of my departure forget to order ... £100 to be set aside'. Elizabeth Coffin died on 27 January 1839, with Admiral Sir Isaac Coffin dying six months later on 23 July 1839, at the age of 80. He was buried at Cheltenham, Gloucestershire. As he had no sons, the baronetcy became extinct upon his death.

== Legacy ==
Coffin Bay and Greenly Island in South Australia were named in honor of Sir Isaac Coffin by the British explorer Matthew Flinders in 1802.

The Coffin School on Nantucket, established with funds provided by Sir Isaac Coffin, was established in 1827. Known as the Admiral Sir Isaac Coffin Lancasterian School, this educational institution was funded by Coffin for the purpose of "promoting decency, good order and morality, and for giving a good English education to youth". The school educated Nantucketers throughout the 19th century. The imposing Greek Revival building in which it was housed after 1854 (and which prominently bears Sir Isaac's name) functioned for a variety of educational purposes throughout the twentieth century and is now used to provide services to Nantucket youth.

Coffins were not named for him. The word coffin, first attested in English in 1380, derives from the Old French cofin, from Latin cophinus, the latinisation of Greek κόφινος (kophinos), all meaning basket. The earliest attested form of the word is the Mycenaean Greek ko-pi-na, written in Linear B syllabic script. The modern French form, couffin, means cradle. (Note: See also berceau, couffin and cophinus at Wiktionary)

== Bibliography ==
- "Sir Isaac Coffin, 1st Baronet". Dictionary of Canadian Biography (online ed.). University of Toronto Press. 1979–2016.
- The Naval Chronicle. Vol. 12. J. Gold. 1805. (reissued by Cambridge University Press, 2010. ISBN 978-1-108-01851-7)
- Army and Navy Chronicle. Vol. 8–9. Benjamin Homans. 1839.
- Clarke, James Stanier (1805). The Naval Chronicle. Vol. 12. London: J. Gold.
- The Gentleman's Magazine. Vol. 167. London: F. Jefferies. 1840.
- Goodrich, Samuel Griswold (1840). Biography of eminent men, statesmen, heroes, authors, artists, and men of science, of Europe and America. Vol. 2. London: Cornish, Lamport.
- Laughton, J. K. (1893). "Coffin, Sir Isaac (1759–1839)". In Gwyn, Julian (ed.). Oxford Dictionary of National Biography. Oxford Dictionary of National Biography. Vol. 36 (online ed.). Oxford University Press. doi:10.1093/ref:odnb/5807. (Subscription, Wikipedia Library access or UK public library membership required.)
- The Nautical Magazine. Vol. 2. Brown, Son and Ferguson. 1832.
- Tracy, Nicholas (2006). Who's who in Nelson's Navy: 200 Naval Heroes. London: Chatham Publishing. ISBN 1-86176-244-5.
- Cuhaj, George S. (2009). Standard Catalog of World Coins 1801–1900. Wisconsin: Krause Publications. ISBN 978-0-89689-940-7.

Parliament of the United Kingdom
Preceded by Hon. John Ward; George Philips	Member of Parliament for Ilchester; 1818–1826; Served alongside: John Merest (1818–1820); Stephen Lushington (1820–1826)	Succeeded by Richard Sharp; John Williams
Baronetage of the United Kingdom
New creation	Baronet (of the Magdalaine Islands); 1804–1839	Extinct
Preceded by Middleton baronets	Coffin baronets of the Magdalaine Islands; 12 May 1804	Succeeded by Honyman baronets
Military offices
Preceded by Henry Duncan	Resident Commissioner, Halifax; 1799–1800	Succeeded by Henry Duncan
