= HMS Resistance (1801) =

Royal Navy fifth-rate frigate

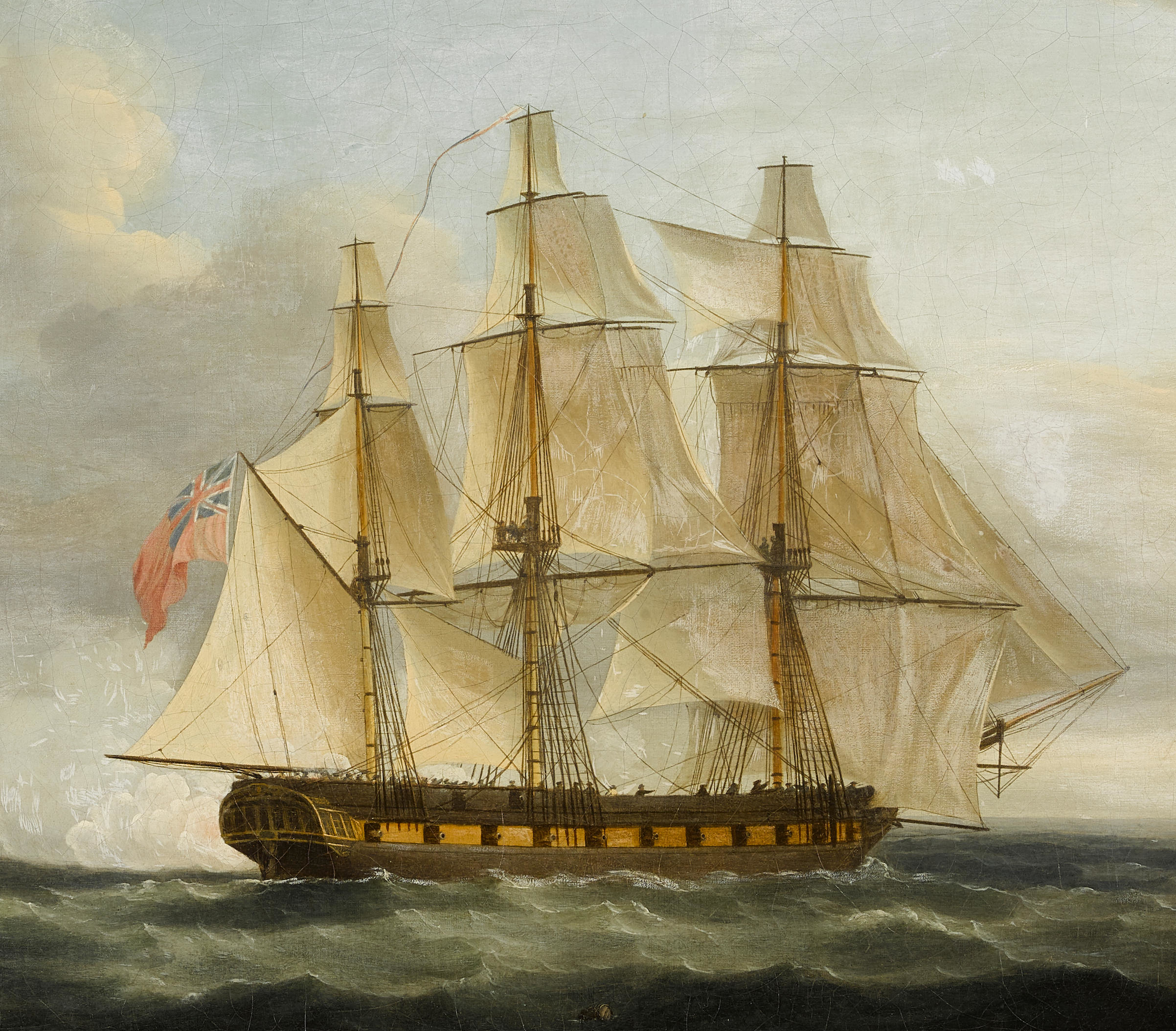
- Resistance's sister ship HMS Aigle

History

United Kingdom
- Name: HMS Resistance
- Ordered: 28 January 1800
- Builder: George Parsons, Bursledon
- Laid down: March 1800
- Launched: 29 April 1801
- Completed: 21 June 1801
- Commissioned: May 1801
- Fate: Wrecked 31 May 1803

General characteristics
- Class & type: Fifth-rate Aigle-class frigate
- Tons burthen: 9758/94 (bm)
- Length: 146 ft 1 1/4 in (44.5 m) (upper deck); 122 ft 1 in (37.2 m) (keel)
- Beam: 38 ft 9 in (11.8 m)
- Draught: 10 ft 5 in (3.2 m) (forward); 15 ft 7 in (4.7 m) (aft)
- Depth of hold: 13 ft 0 1/2 in (4 m)
- Propulsion: Sails
- Complement: 264
- Armament: UD: 26 × 18-pounder guns; QD: 4 × 9-pounder guns + 8 × 32-pounder carronades; Fc: 4 × 9-pounder guns + 2 × 32-pounder carronades

HMS Resistance was a 36-gun fifth-rate Aigle-class frigate of the Royal Navy, one of a pair designed by Sir John Henslow. Resistance was commissioned in May 1801 by Captain Henry Digby, and after brief service in the English Channel the frigate left for Quebec in charge of a convoy. While on voyage Resistance captured the French privateer Elizabeth, which was the last ship captured during the French Revolutionary War. Having returned to England at the end of the year, the frigate resumed service in the English Channel, with Captain Philip Wodehouse replacing Digby. On 31 May 1803 Resistance was sailing to the Mediterranean Sea when she was wrecked off Cape St. Vincent; the crew survived.

== Design and construction ==
Resistance was a 36-gun, 18-pounder, fifth-rate Aigle-class frigate. Designed by the Surveyor of the Navy Sir John Henslow in 1798, the ship was one of two constructed to the design, along with the namesake of the class HMS Aigle. During the French Revolutionary War British frigate designs were frequently lengthened so that they could reach sailing speeds comparable to French frigates. The Aigle class followed this trend, being close in dimensions to the Penelope class which the naval historian Robert Gardiner describes as the "apogee" of the lengthening trend. The Aigle class did not, however, have the same shallow depth in the hold that the Penelope class did, in fact being known as "very roomy".

The Aigle-class frigates were the first to be designed with solid barricades on their forecastle, but their initial designs were changed considerably as they underwent construction. Most notably the barricades were adapted to have access openings in them on 15 November 1798, and the location of the head was raised on 6 June 1800. In 1817 Aigle received further changes during a refit, including the addition of a circular stern, but Resistance did not survive to receive these more impactful additions.

Resistance was designed with a crew complement of 264, and held twenty-six 18-pounder guns on the upper deck. This main armament was planned to be supported by four 9-pounder guns and eight 32-pounder carronades on the quarterdeck, with a further four 9-pounder guns and two 32-pounder carronades on the forecastle. The 9-pounder guns were in place as chase guns. On 17 June 1799, before Resistance was laid down, an Admiralty Order saw two of the 9-pounder guns on the quarterdeck and forecastle replaced by more 32-pounder carronades, necessitating the widening of the gunports to accept the larger guns. The order was reversed on 15 October 1801, and Resistance had the 9-pounder guns returned to her.

Resistance was ordered on 28 January 1800 to be built at Bursledon by the shipwright George Parsons. Laid down in March of the same year, Resistance was launched on 29 April 1801 with the following dimensions: 146 feet 1 1/4 inches (44.5 m) along the upper deck and 122 feet 1 inch (37.2 m) along the keel, with a beam of 38 feet 9 inches (11.8 m) and a depth in the hold of 13 feet 0 1/2 inch (4 m). The ship had a draught of 10 feet 5 inches (3.2 m) forward and 15 feet 7 inches (4.7 m) aft, and measured 9758/94 tons burthen. The fitting out process was completed at Portsmouth Dockyard on 21 June. (Note: The First Lord of the Admiralty, Lord St Vincent, was untrusting of civilian shipyards and Parsons was one of very few such shipwrights to continue receiving orders for Royal Navy vessels. In reward for completing and launching Resistance on schedule he was given the order for the 36-gun frigate HMS Tribune.)

Gardiner describes Resistance's sister Aigle as a "good all-round performer under sail", but says that the ship was not quite the fastest of its type. The class was, for example, outclassed in sailing capabilities by the Apollo class that had been designed around the same time and was "generally similar". Despite this the Aigle class was recorded as fast, weatherly, and manoeuvrable, capable of reaching between 10 knots (19 km/h) and 12 knots (22 km/h) in the most favourable of conditions.

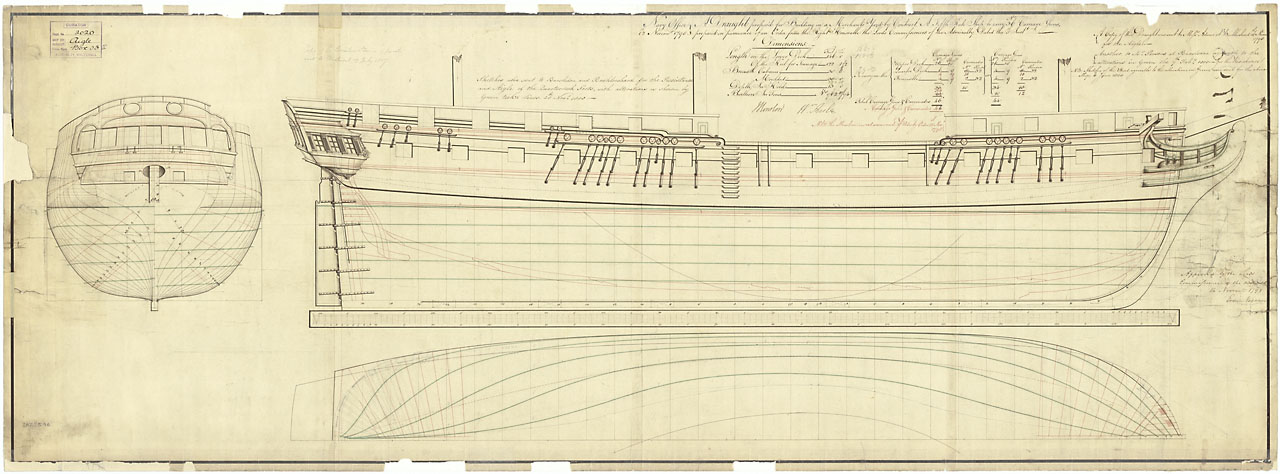
The 1798 design of the Aigle class

== Service ==
Having been appointed to Resistance on 21 April 1801, Captain Henry Digby commissioned the ship in May. Resistance initially served in the English Channel, returning to Portsmouth from a cruise off Le Havre on 30 June. Then on 3 August the frigate sailed to the North America Station as escort to a convoy heading to Quebec. While acting in this role Resistance captured the French 8-gun privateer Elizabeth on 22 August, as the latter attempted to sail from Cayenne to Bordeaux. This was the last ship taken during the French Revolutionary War. Digby brought Elizabeth with him to Quebec, where the privateer was sold for around £6,000–7,000.

Resistance returned to Britain towards the end of the year, arriving back at Portsmouth on 30 November. The frigate was subsequently ordered to prepare for a journey to the West Indies Station, and on 6 January 1802 was storing ship for the journey at Gosport. Lieutenant Henry Thomas Lutwidge was sent ashore with the ship's launch, and by the evening was ready to return to Resistance. His boat crew however had become intoxicated while ashore, and one seaman named Fagan was incapable of using the oar he was holding. Worried that they would miss the tide and not make it back to Resistance, Lutwidge ordered another man to take over from Fagan. When Fagan refused to release his oar to the man, Lutwidge came forward and hit each of them on the arm with the tiller, and then struck Fagan on the head with it. Fagan released the oar and fell into the bottom of the boat.

Having been dragged on board by his shipmates Fagan did not report the injury, and died the following morning. The ship's surgeon, William Beatty, recorded his death as suffocation or apoplexy from drunkenness. (Note: Beatty, who would go on to serve as Horatio Nelson's chief surgeon at the Battle of Trafalgar, left Resistance in January 1802.) At Haslar Naval Hospital the injury was discovered, and Lutwidge reported himself to Digby, requesting an investigation. On 13 March Lutwidge was brought to trial at Winchester, accused of murdering Fagan. He received favourable testimonies of his character from several naval officers and seamen, and was acquitted of murder but found guilty of manslaughter, punished with three months imprisonment and a fine of £100. (Note: Lutwidge continued in the navy and was promoted to commander on 26 November 1830, dying at that rank on 30 January 1861.)

The ship in the meantime resumed her role as a cruiser, leaving Portsmouth on 28 January on anti-smuggling duties, from which she returned on 12 February. Resistance continued tackling smugglers through the winter. With the Peace of Amiens beginning, Digby went on half pay on 9 May and was replaced in command by Captain Philip Wodehouse. Resistance went on further anti-smuggling patrols on 13 June. For a period of time after this the frigate was stationed at Weymouth, attending to the visiting George III. Resistance returned to Portsmouth from these duties on 12 August, and on 22 September sailed to Chatham Dockyard to be paid off. After a brief pause in service the ship was recommissioned in the same month, and on 31 October returned to Portsmouth from patrolling "eastward".

Resistance sailed from Portsmouth to Lymington on 2 November, there taking on board Captain Sir Harry Neale and his family. The frigate took the Neales to Naples where they looked to recuperate their failing health. Having completed this, on 31 May 1803 Resistance was returning to the Mediterranean Sea when the frigate was wrecked off the Portuguese coast a few miles north of Cape St. Vincent. The entire crew survived.
