= Francis Hartwell =

Sir Francis Hartwell, 1st Baronet (15 February 1757 – 28 June 1831) was a British Navy officer and Deputy Comptroller of the Navy from 1808 to 1814.

He was born the son of Captain Broderick Hartwell, RN, of Dale Hall, Essex, later the lieutenant-governor of Greenwich Hospital. Francis was commissioned into the Navy himself as a lieutenant in 1775.

In 1777 he was given command of the troopship Lord Amherst in Jamaica, but the ship was wrecked on Bermuda when transporting wounded soldiers back to England. He had better luck with his next command, the cutter Rattlesnake in the Channel fleet, when they captured a French West-Indiaman, after which he was promoted commander. He then took the Aetna 8 to Africa in 1779 and took part in the capture of the island of Gorée in Senegal from the French before sailing to the West Indies. There he was promoted captain and briefly given command of HMS Sphinx, a 20 gun six-rater before transferring to HMS Brune, 32-gun frigate, with which he captured a French ship, the Renard and the privateer Resolution.

In 1792 he recommissioned HMS Thetis, a 38-gun fifth-rate frigate, and escorted a convoy to St. Helena after which he captured two French merchantmen, unfortunately losing one back to the French. When Thetis was paid off the following year he retired from active service.

He thereafter served the Navy in an administrative capacity as a commissioner of the Victualling Board and commissioner of Sheerness (1796) and at Chatham (1799). He was appointed a Navy commissioner without special function in 1801 before being appointed Deputy Comptroller of the Navy from 1808 to 1814.

He was knighted in May 1802 and on 26 October 1805 created the 1st Baronet Hartwell of Dale Hall, Essex.

He died at his London residence in 1831. He had married in 1781 Anne Charlotte Maria, the eldest daughter of Captain John Elphinstone by whom he had 2 surviving sons, one of whom predeceased him. On his first wife's death he had married Louisa Aldridge in 1812, by whom he had a daughter. He was succeeded in the baronetcy by his grandson Sir Brodrick Hartwell, 2nd Baronet.

Baronetage of the United Kingdom
New creation	Baronet (of Dale Hall); 1805–1831	Succeeded by Brodrick Hartwell
