= Royal Naval Dockyard, Halifax =

Naval base in Halifax, Nova Scotia

- Halifax, Nova Scotia, Canada
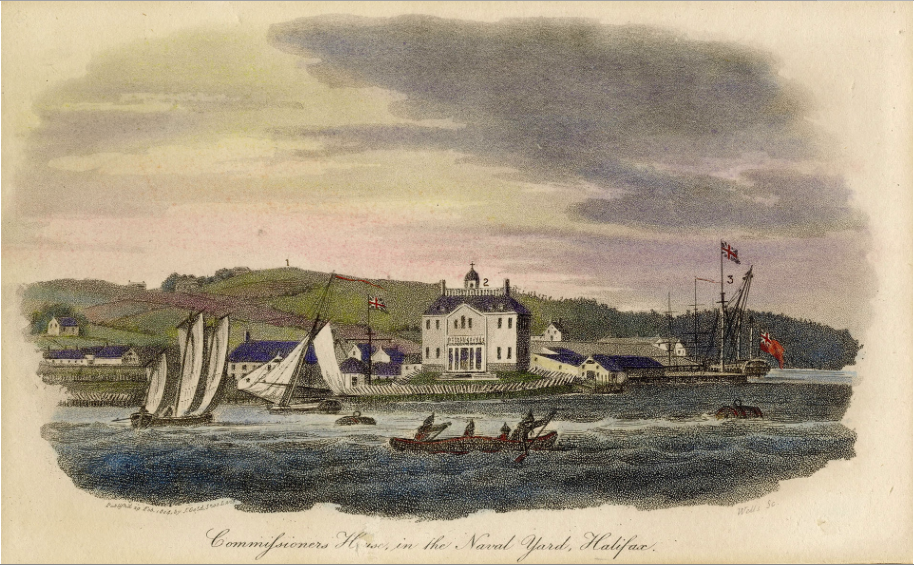
- View of Halifax Naval Yard, c. 1804

Site information
- Type: Shipyard, dockyard
- Operator: Royal Navy (1759–1905); (Canada) Canadian Department of Marine and Fisheries (1907–1911); Royal Canadian Navy (1911–present)

Location
- Coordinates: 44°39′23.63″N 63°34′44.69″W

Site history
- Built: 1759
- In use: 1759–present

National Historic Site of Canada
- Official name: Halifax Dockyard National Historic Site of Canada
- Designated: 1923

Garrison information
- Garrison: North American Station

Royal Naval Dockyard, Halifax was a Royal Navy base in Halifax, Nova Scotia. Established in 1759, the Halifax Yard served as the headquarters for the Royal Navy's North American Station for sixty years, starting with the Seven Years' War. The Royal Navy continued to operate the station until it was closed in 1905. The station was sold to Canada in 1907 becoming His Majesty's Canadian Dockyard, a function it still serves today as part of CFB Halifax.

== History ==
Halifax Harbour had served as a Royal Navy seasonal base from the founding of the city in 1749, using temporary facilities and a careening beach on Georges Island. The British purchased the property which now contains the Fleet Maintenance Facility Cape Scott for the Naval Yard. This property had belonged to John Gorham (Gorham Point), Captain Ephraim Cook, Philip Durell, Joseph Gerrish and William Nesbitt. (In the summer of 1751, Gorham built the first registered vessel in Halifax, a brig he named Osborn Galley, at Gorham Point.) Land and buildings for a permanent Naval Yard were purchased in 1758 and the Yard was officially commissioned in 1759. The Yard served as the main base for the Royal Navy in North America during the Seven Years' War, the American Revolution, the French Revolutionary Wars and the War of 1812.

In 1818 Halifax became the summer base for the squadron which shifted to the Royal Naval Dockyard, Bermuda, for the remainder of the year. The Halifax yard did not have a dry dock until 1887 so it was officially called the "Halifax Naval Yard" when first established, although it was popularly known as the Halifax Dockyard. The graving dock, coaling facilities and torpedo boat slip were added between 1881 and 1897. The station closed in 1905 and sold to Canada in 1907, becoming His Majesty's Canadian Dockyard, a function it still serves today as part of CFB Halifax.

The Yard was on the western shores of Halifax Harbour to the north of Citadel Hill and the main Halifax townsite. In addition to refitting and supplying the North American Squadron the Halifax Yard played a vital role in supplying masts and spars for the entire Royal Navy after the loss of the timber resources in the American colonies following the American Revolution. Masts cut all over British North America were collected and stored in Halifax to be shipped to British Dockyards in wartime with heavily escorted mast convoys.

The site was designated a National Historic Site of Canada in 1923.

== Facilities ==
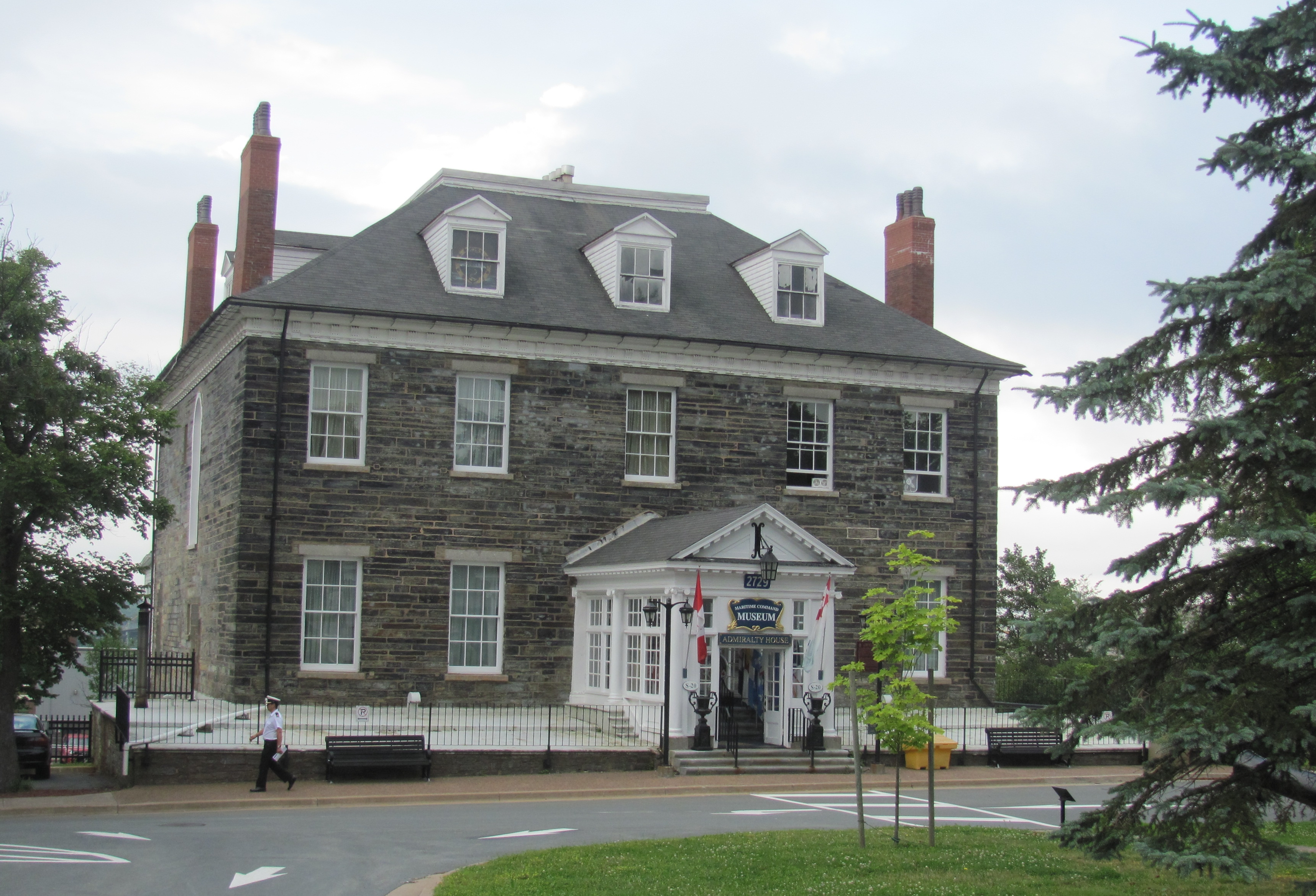
Completed in 1819, Admiralty House served as the summer residence for the commander of the North American station.

The Naval Yard was initially defended by its own large blockhouse, three redoubts and a fortified stone wall. These defences were enhanced and later replaced by the large network of army fortifications whose main purposes was to safeguard the Naval Dockyard including nearby Fort Needham, Fort George, the Halifax Citadel; York Redoubt; Fort Charlotte on Georges Island, Fort Clarence in Dartmouth; five forts on McNabs Island and extensive batteries at Point Pleasant.

Many of the original Royal Navy 18th and 19th century buildings in the Dockyard were destroyed in the 1917 Halifax Explosion; others were demolished in World War II to make way for machine shops, stores buildings and drill halls needed to man and maintain the many escort ships being commissioned during the crash expansion of the Royal Canadian Navy during the Battle of the Atlantic. Only one residence from 1814 and the Admiral's Residence from 1816 survived. The Admiral's residence is now the Maritime Command Museum. The original Naval Yard clock has been restored and moved to the Halifax Ferry Terminal entrance while the original Naval Yard bell is preserved at the Maritime Museum of the Atlantic in Halifax, a museum which also features a large diorama depicting the Naval Yard in 1813 at its height in the Age of Sail.

The building and facilities in the base included:

- careening wharf
- mast ponds and mast house
- boat house
- refitting yard
- building slip
- astronomical observatory
- commissioner's residence
- graving yard (after 1887)
- coal facility
- torpedo boat yard
- Wardroom
- victualling yard (North Dockyard)
- Gate Warder's House
- Commissioner's House
- Hospital – home to Royal Naval College of Canada from 1911 to 1917
- Admiralty House – home to the Admiral of the North American Station and now Maritime Command Museum

== Ships ==
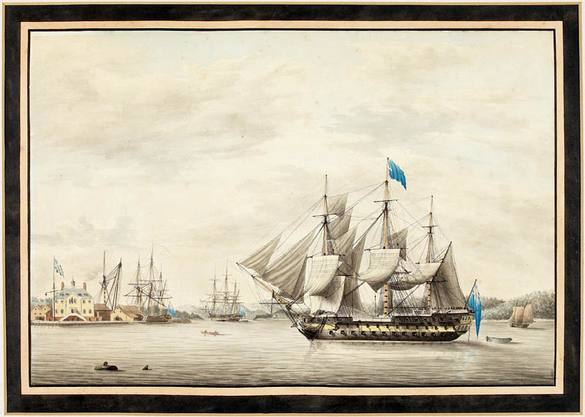
HMS Asia at the Halifax Naval Yard, c. 1797.

The main purpose of the Halifax Yard was to supply, man and refit ships but it also built some warships including:

- HMS Halifax (1768)
- HMS Halifax (1806)

Ships based at the Royal Navy Yard Halifax included:

- HMS Asia
- HMS Atalanta
- HMS Aeolus
- HMS Driver
- HMS Indian
- HMS Shannon

== Administration of the dockyard and other key officials ==
The Master Shipwright was originally the key civil official at the royal navy dockyards during the 16th century until the Navy Board introduced resident commissioners of the navy in the 17th century, after which he became deputy to the resident commissioner. In 1832 the post of commissioner was replaced by the post of superintendent, who was retained the same powers and authority as the former commissioners. In September 1971 all flag officers of the Royal Navy holding positions of Admiral Superintendents at Royal Dockyards were restyled as Port Admirals.

=== Resident Commissioner of the Navy, Halifax Nova Scotia ===
Incomplete list of post holders included:

1. 1775–1778, Captain Marriott Arbuthnot
2. 1778–1781, Captain Sir Richard Hughes
3. 1781–1783, Captain Andrew Snape Hamond
4. 1783–1799, Captain Henry Duncan
5. 1799–1800, Captain Isaac Coffin
6. 1800–1803, Captain Henry Duncan
7. 1803–1812, Captain John Nicholson Inglefield
8. 1812–1819, Captain Philip Wodehouse

=== Master Shipwright, Halifax Dockyard ===
Incomplete list of post holders included:

1. 1756–1762, George Kittoe (originally appointed as acting master shipwright)
2. 1763–1770, Abraham Constable
3. 1783–1792 Provo Featherstone Wallis, father of Provo Wallis
4. 1813–1818, Thomas Forder Hawkes
5. 1818–1839, Algernon Frederick Jones

Note: (post holders were appointed until 1875)

=== Master Attendant, Halifax Dockyard ===
Incomplete list of post holders included:

1. 1758, Richard Hamilton
2. 1763, David Hooper
3. 1780–1787, Samuel Hemmens
4. 1788–1799, Thomas Read
5. 1799–1802, John Jackson
6. 1806, John Parry
7. 1807–1810, Thomas Atkinson
8. 1815–1827, John Douglas

=== Storekeeper, Halifax Dockyard ===
Incomplete list of post holders included:

1. 1756-1773/, Joseph Gerrish (superannuated)
2. 1773–1780, Richard Williams (resigned March 1780)
3. 1780, Mar–Aug, John Gambier
4. 1780, George Thomas
5. 1790–1799, Titus Livie
6. 1832–1840, John Robert Glover
7. 1841–1852, Alex Elliot

=== Naval Storekeeper, Halifax Dockyard ===
Title changed in 1853

1. 1853–1854, Alex Elliot
2. 1855–1858, Edgecumbe Chevallier
3. 1858–1859, John N. Macgregor

=== Naval Storekeeper and Agent Victualler, Halifax Dockyard ===
Additional title and responsibility added in 1859

1. 1859, John N. Macgregor

=== Officers-in-Charge, Royal Naval Hospital Halifax ===
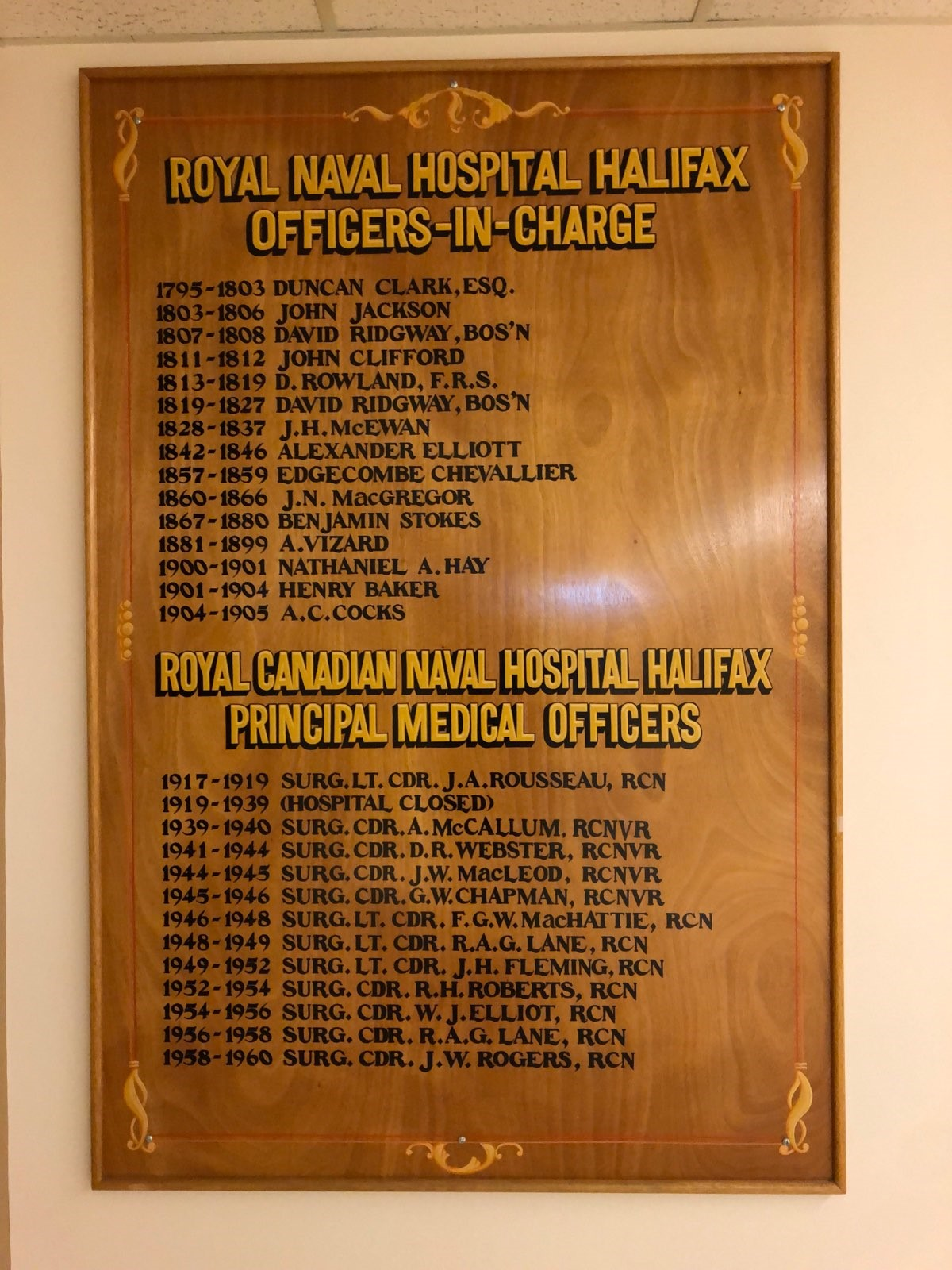
Royal Naval Hospital Halifax – Officers-in-Charge, Health Centre, CFB Halifax, Nova Scotia

1. 1795–1803 Duncan Clark
2. 1803–1806 John Jackson
3. 1807–1808 David Ridgway
4. 1811–1812 John Clifford ( – 31 Dec. 1812)
5. 1813–1819 David Rowlands
6. 1819–1827 David Ridgway
7. 1828–1837 J.H. McEwan
8. 1841–1855 Alexander Elliott
9. 1855–1859 Edgecombe (Edgecumbe) Chevallier
10. 1860–1866 J.N. MacGregor
11. 1867–1880 Benjamin Stokes
12. 1881–1899 Andrew Vizard (1841-27 Oct 1922)
13. 1900–1901 Nathaniel A. Hay
14. 1901–1904 Henry Baker
15. 1904–1905 A.C. Cocks

== See also ==
- George Benson Hall
- History of the Halifax Regional Municipality
- Military history of Nova Scotia
- Port of Halifax
- List of historic places in Halifax, Nova Scotia

== Sources ==
1. Brent Raymond, "Tracing the Built Form of HMC Dockyard", Nova Scotia Museum, 1999. Curatorial Report No. 88
2. Clowes, Sir William Laird (1897–1903). The royal navy, a history from the earliest times to the present Volume III. London, England: S. Low Marston.
3. Clowes, Sir William Laird (1897–1903). The royal navy, a history from the earliest times to the present Volume IV. London, England: S. Low Marston.
4. Clowes, Sir William Laird (1897–1903). The royal navy, a history from the earliest times to the present Volume V. London, England: S. Low Marston.
5. George Bates. John Gorham 1709–1751. Collections of the Nova Scotia Historical Society.
6. Gwyn, Julian, (2004). Frigates and Foremasts: The North American Squadron in Nova Scotia Waters, 1745–1815 Vancouver, BC: UBC Press ISBN 978-0-7748-0911-5. OCLC 144078613.
7. Harrison, Simon (2010–2018). "Master Attendant at Halifax Dockyard". threedecks.org. S. Harrison.
8. Harrison, Simon (2010–2018). "Master Shipwright at Halifax Dockyard". threedecks.org. S. Harrison.
9. Harrison, Simon (2010–2018). "Storekeeper at Halifax Dockyard". threedecks.org. S. Harrison.
10. Marilyn Gurney, The Kings Yard, Maritime Command Museum, Halifax.
11. Research guide B5: Royal Naval Dockyards
12. CFB Halifax Officers Mess.
