= Mentor (1784 ship) =

Slave ship (1784–1794)

History

Great Britain
- Name: HMS Wasp
- Builder: Portsmouth Dockyard [M/Shipwright Peirson Lock]
- Launched: 1749
- Captured: Sold 1781

Great Britain
- Name: Polly
- Acquired: 1781
- Renamed: Mentor (1784)
- Captured: c. December 1795

General characteristics
- Tons burthen: 136, or 1403/94, or 14037/94or 150 (bm)
- Length: Overall: 73 ft 3 in (22.3 m); Keel: 61 ft 9 in (18.8 m)
- Beam: 20 ft 8 in (6.3 m)
- Depth of hold: 9 ft 2 in (2.8 m)
- Complement: 50 (Royal Navy)
- Armament: 1749: 8 × 3-pounder guns + 10 × ½-pounder swivel gunss; 1782: 8 × 9-pounder + 2 × 6-pounder guns

Mentor was the former HMS Wasp. The British Royal Navy sold Wasp in 1781 and she became the mercantile Polly, which traded with Africa. In 1784 Polly became the slave ship Mentor. Mentor made eight full voyages in the triangular trade in enslaved people. She carried captives from The Gambia to the West Indies. French privateers captured her in late 1795 as she was on her way from West Africa to the West Indies on her ninth voyage.

== HMS Wasp ==
Captain John Barker commissioned Wasp in July 1749. In January 1753 he sailed her to Nova Scotia. She was laid up and paid off at Deptford on 17 October 1754.

The Navy surveyed Wasp on 14 January 1755. In June Commander William Leaver recommissioned her. She served on the Downs station in 1756-1757.

Commander Edward Yates, recommissioned Wasp in June 1760 for cruising in Home Waters. Commander George Collier replaced Yates in August 1761. Commander William Cornwallis replaced Yates in July 1762, and Commander William Webster replaced Cornwallis in October. Wasp was paid off in March 1763.

Wasp was surveyed On 8 March 1763. Commander Charles Leslie recommissioned her in April 1763, for the Western Channel. In 1764 Commander George Talbot commanded her for the Irish Sea, and cruising. In 1767 she was under Commander James Cumming, for cruising in Home waters.

In 1764 Commander George Talbot commanded Wasp for the Irish Sea, and cruising. In 1767 Commander James Cumming commanded her for cruising in Home waters. In 1770 she was under Commander Henry Duncan. In November 1772 she was under Commander Richard Toby; In May 1773 Commander St John Chinnery commanded her, still in the Irish Sea.

Wasp participated in the Spithead Review on 22 June 1773.

Between September and November 1774, Wasp underwent fitting at Plymouth. Commander Richard Bligh commissioned her in November. Commander William Blair replaced Bligh in December 1777. Commander James Lys replaced Blair in April 1778, and Commander Martin Cole replaced Lys in March 1780.

Disposal: Wasp was paid off in September 1780. The Navy sold her on 4 January 1781.

== Polly ==
Polly first appeared in Lloyd's Register (LR) in 1782. LR carried the annotation that she had been the sloop-of-war Wasp. On 31 August 1781, Polly, Duley, master arrived at Gravesend from Gorée.

Year	Master	Owner	Trade	Source & notes
1782	B.Duley	Capt.&Co.	London–Africa	LR
1784	B.Duley	Capt.&Co.	London–Africa	LR

Although her trade initially was London–Africa, Polly apparently was not an enslaving ship. She does not appear in the most complete database of trans-Atlantic enslaving voyages. Duley did not remain her master. He apparently sailed to Africa in 1784 in Recovery, also not listed as an enslaving ship.

== Mentor ==
Mentor first appeared in LR in 1784. It noted that she had been Polly.

Year	Master	Owner	Trade	Source & notes
1784	Middleton	Capt. & Co.	London–Africa	LR; small repairs 1784
1786	Middleton; W.Littleton	Capt. & Co.	London–Africa	LR; raised 1786 & new deck of pine

1st voyage transporting enslaved people (1784–1785): Captain William Lyttleton sailed from London on 22 October 1784, bound for The Gambia, sailing via Teneriffe. Mentor arrived at Charleston on 28 May 1785 with 152 captives. She arrived back at London on 18 September.

2nd voyage transporting enslaved people (1786–1787): Captain Lyttleton sailed from London on 11 March 1786, bound for The Gambia. Mentor arrived at Kingston, Jamaica on 23 December 1786 with 220 captives, and landed 197. She had embarked 242. The mortality rate was 19%. She arrived back at London on 23 March 1787. (Lloyd's List reported that Mentor, Littleton, master, had arrived at Dominica with 220 slaves, and sailed on to Jamaica.)

The Slave Trade Act 1788 (Dolben's Act) limited the number of enslaved people that British enslaving ships were permitted to transport, based on the ships' tons burthen. It was the first British legislation passed to regulate shipping slaves. At a burthen of 136 tons, the cap would have been 227 captives. After the passage of Dolben's Act, masters received a bonus of £100 for a mortality rate of under 2%; the ship's surgeon received £50. For a mortality rate between two and three per cent, the bonus was halved. There was no bonus if mortality exceeded 3%.

3rd voyage transporting enslaved people (1788): Captain John Hamilton sailed from London on 8 March 1788, bound for The Gambia. Mentor arrived at Kingston on 2 August 1788 with 213 captives and landed 208; she had embarked 216. The mortality rate was about 4%. She arrived back at London on 9 November.

4th voyage transporting enslaved people (1789–1790): Captain Robert Lewin sailed from London on 22 February 1789, bound for The Gambia. Mentor, Wilcox, master arrived at Jamaica in December with 190 captives. She arrived back in England on 28 April 1790.

5th voyage transporting enslaved people (1790–1791): Captain Edward Wilcox sailed from London on 31 December 1790, bound for West Africa. While Mentor was in the Downs she had to cut her cables and then return to Dover. Mentor arrived at Jamaica in July 1791 with 186 captives. Her master when she arrived was Johnson.

6th voyage transporting enslaved people (1792): Captain Taylor sailed from London on 5 April 1792, bound for the Gambia. Mentor arrived at Dominica on 1 August, with 130 captives. She arrived back at London on 14 October.

7th voyage transporting enslaved people (1792–1793): Captain John Brand sailed from London of 22 November 1792, bound for The Gambia. Mentor started acquiring captives on 12 January 1793. She sailed from Africa on 26 March with 194 captives and arrived at Kingston on 28 April with 190. The mortality rate was just over 2%. She was also at Dominica, but whether before or after Kingston is not clear. She arrived back in London on 8 September.

8th voyage transporting enslaved people (1794): Captain Brand sailed from London 28 February 1794. Mentor started acquiring captives at the Gambia on 1 May, and left there on 3 June, with 203 captives. She arrived at St Vincent on 2 July, with 197 captives. Her mortality rate was just under 3%. She arrived back in London on 17 September.

== Fate ==
Captain Brand sailed from London on 12 June 1795, bound for West Africa on Mentor's ninth voyage transporting enslaved people. That year, 79 vessels from England sailed on enslaving voyages; 14 of these vessels sailed from London.

Mentor arrived in West Africa but as she was on her way from Africa to the West Indies, French privateers from Gorée captured her and took her into Gorée.

In 1795, 50 British ships transporting enslaved people were lost. This was the worst loss in the period 1793 to 1807. Seven of the losses occurred in the Middle Passage, that is as the ships were on their way from Africa to the West Indies. War, not maritime hazards nor resistance by the captives, was the greatest cause of vessel losses among British vessels transporting enslaved people .
