= HMS Aurora (1777) =

Enterprise-class Royal Navy frigate

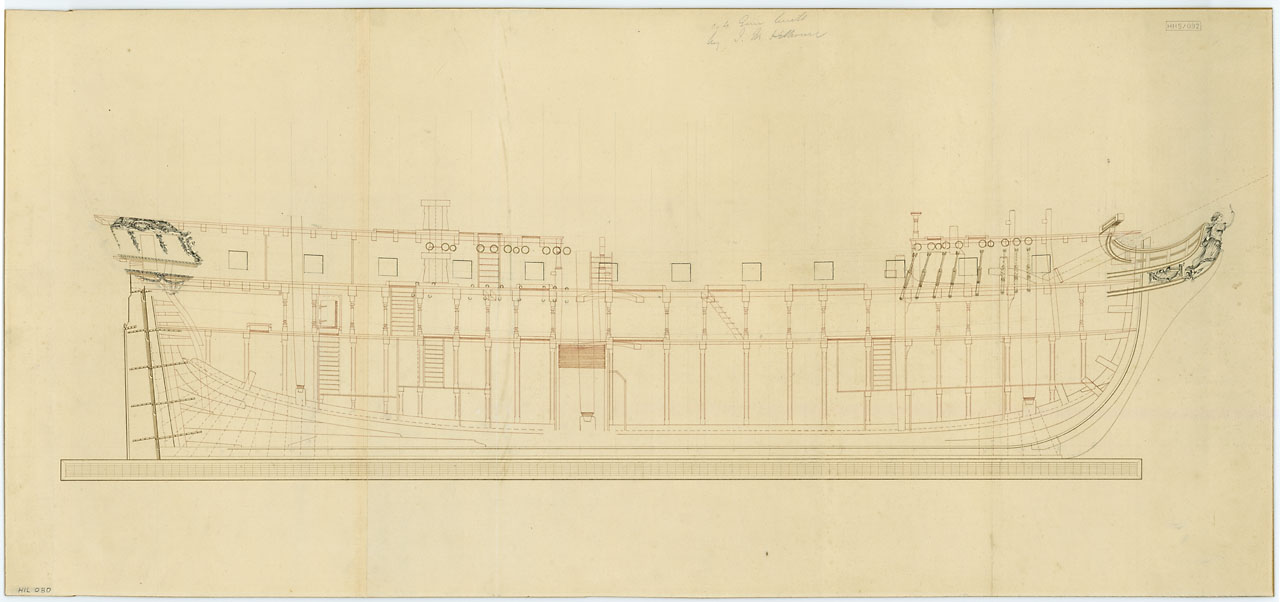
- Plan of an Enterprise-class frigate, similar to Aurora

History

Great Britain
- Name: HMS Aurora
- Ordered: 3 July 1776
- Builder: John Perry & Co, Blackwall
- Laid down: July 1776
- Launched: 7 June 1777
- Completed: 9 August 1777 (at Woolwich Dockyard)
- Commissioned: July 1777
- Fate: Sold to break up 3 November 1814

General characteristics
- Class & type: 28-gun Enterprise-class sixth-rate frigate
- Tons burthen: 595 86/94 (bm)
- Length: 120 ft 6 in (36.73 m) (overall); 99 ft 4 in (30.28 m) (keel)
- Beam: 33 ft 7 in (10.2 m)
- Depth of hold: 11 ft 0 in (3.35 m)
- Sail plan: Full-rigged ship
- Complement: 200 officers and men
- Armament: Upper deck: 24 × 9-pounder guns; QD: 4 × 3-pounder guns; 12 × swivel guns

HMS Aurora was a 28-gun Enterprise-class sixth-rate frigate of the Royal Navy, that saw service during the American and French Revolutionary wars, and the Napoleonic Wars. Designed to carry a complement of 200 men, she was armed with a main battery of twenty-four 9-pound guns.

Launched in June 1777, she was commissioned the following month and sent to the West Indies where she formed part of a squadron under Vice-admiral Clark Gayton, attacking American shipping interests in the area. On 13 January 1778, under command of Capt. Harmon Courter, she captured the American privateer "St. Peter". Her tender, schooner Libra, captured sloop Fly on 21 February, 1778.

At the beginning of 1794 Aurora was among the British vessels assisting Sir David Dundas in capturing the town of San Fiorenzo, Corsica. In January 1797, Aurora came under the command of Henry Digby in the Mediterranean and in November the following year, took part in the capture of Minorca.

Returning to the West Indies in 1808, she joined Charles Dashwood's squadron which took possession of the town of Samaná in November and in July 1809, escorted a large force under Hugh Lyle Carmichael sent to expel the French from the city of Santo Domingo. In December 1810, Aurora was laid up, then on 3 November 1814, she was sold.

== Design and construction ==
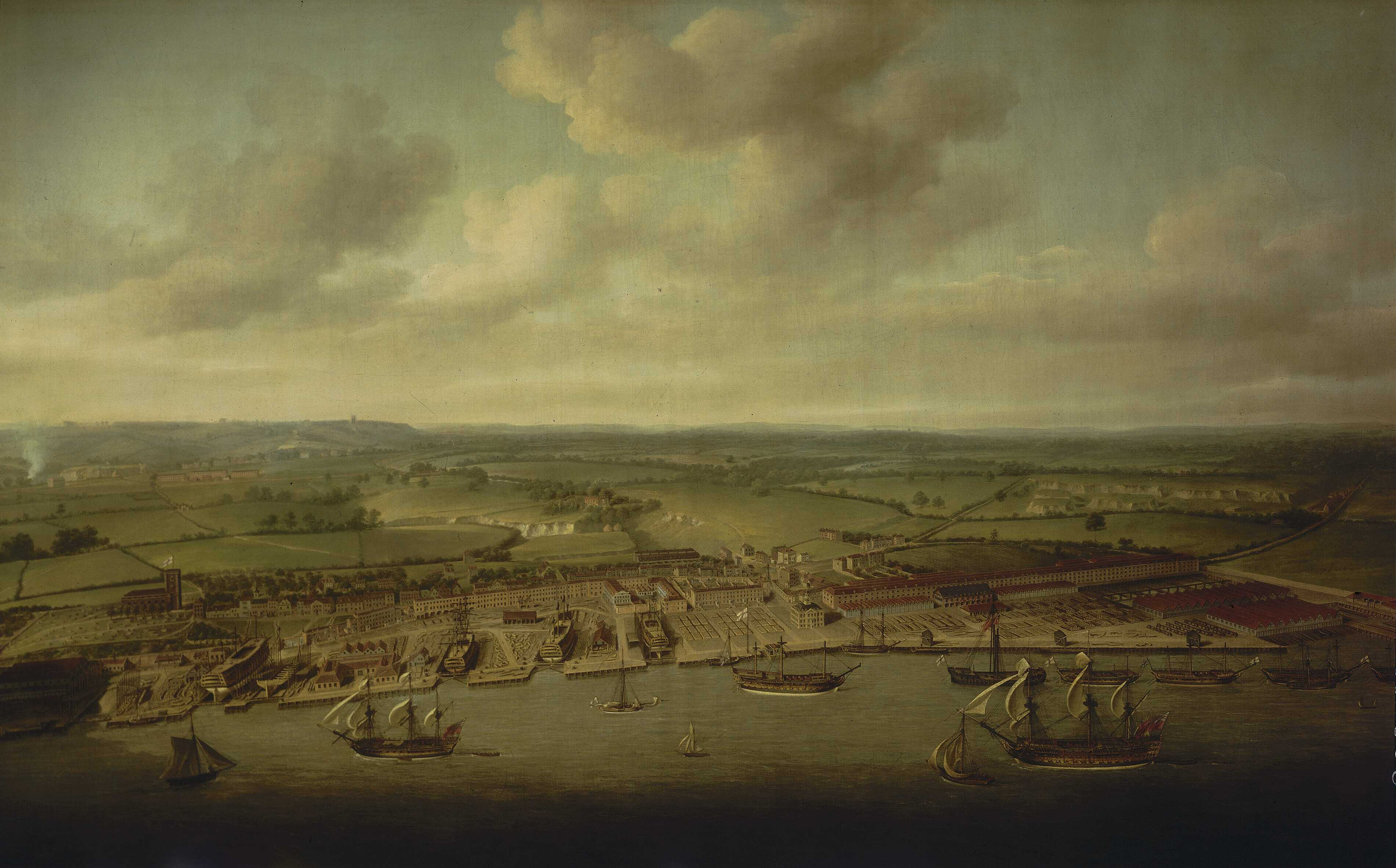
1790 painting of Woolwich Dockyard made 13 years after Aurora was launched there

HMS Aurora was one of a second run of Enterprise-class frigates, designed by John Williams in 1770. She was built at Woolwich by John Perry and Co and was 120 ft 6 in (36.73 m) along the gun deck, 99 ft 4 in (30.28 m) at the keel, and had a beam of 33 ft 7 in (10.24 m). With a depth in the hold of 11 ft 0 in (3.35 m), she was 595 86/94 (bm).

The keel was laid down in July 1776 and she was launched in June the following year. Her initial build cost was £6,595.7.5d, at the time, plus a further £4,283.7.5d for fitting. Designed to take a complement of 200 men, her armament consisted of a 24-gun main battery of 9-pounders on the upper deck with four 3-pound guns on the quarterdeck. Initially, she also carried twelve swivel guns.

In February 1780, an Admiralty order was issued, requiring all Enterprise-class frigates to upgrade the guns on the quarterdeck with 6-pounders and add six 18-pound carronades; four on the quarterdeck and two on the forecastle.

== Career ==
Aurora was first commissioned in July 1777 under the command of Captain James Cumming. She was sent to the West Indies where she served under Vice-admiral Clark Gayton. Gayton's squadron had, by 15 January 1778, taken 219 American prizes and Aurora contributed to that tally when on 13 January she captured the 18-gun rebel privateer, St Peter.

In April 1778, Aurora was part of Admiral James Young's squadron in the Leeward Islands and, at some point before 13 March, had captured the sloop, Fly from North Carolina. In April 1779, Aurora, whilst cruising in the company of Maidstone, intercepted and captured a French snow, Trois Amiees. Aurora returned to England in November, for a refit which included coppering. The work was carried out at Chatham Dockyard and lasted until February the following year when she was recommissioned under the command of Henry Collins.

On 20 July 1780, Aurora captured Union, a Franco-American cutter; then on 5 August, assisted by two others, she captured the privateer Fleur de May. The discovery of ransom bills on board both vessels showed that they had been successfully plundering merchant shipping. (Note: A ransom bill was a promise from a ship's owner, to pay compensation to a privateer, in exchange for letting the captured vessel go.) Between late April and early May 1781, Aurora took two French privateers in The Channel, Le Compte de Guichen and L'Esperance, which was captured off Land's End. Then, in Mount's Bay, in November, Aurora took the Runton, a French cutter. That same month, command passed to George Campbell. Lloyd's List for 14 December 1781 reported that Aurora and the armed ship Heart of Oak had sent the Three Sisters, Cornelieson, master, into Penzance. Three Sisters had been carrying a cargo of planks from Bruges to Nantes.

Campbell and Aurora remained in home waters, retaking the brig, Providence, in February 1782. With the assistance of HMS Lively, on 29 April, Aurora captured the Marquis d'Aubeterre, a French privateer, and recaptured the two brigs in her company, Hope and Two Brothers. Campbell held the post until early in 1783, when he relinquished it to James Dacres.

In August 1784, Aurora went into Portsmouth to undergo a small repair which took until December to complete. She returned to Portsmouth between July and October 1787 for a refit, being recommissioned under John Sutton in the September. In May 1788, Sutton took Aurora back to the West Indies, setting sail for Jamaica on the third. While there, her carpenter Nicholas Rodgers was court martialled on charges of drunkenness. First Lieutenant Crofton and a midshipman, Thomas Vanderdussen, presented evidence that Rodgers would regularly drink himself into a stupor in his cabin or one of the ship's boats, and would refuse, whilst drunk, to let any of the crew carry out carpentry tasks in his absence. On 23 July Rodgers had gone ashore at Bluefields and failed to return until arrested by the marines. Later he ascended the quarterdeck to shout abuse at the boatswain. (Note: Testimony of Thomas Alexander Vanderdussen, midshipman, and Lieutenant Crofton) Rodgers denied all charges other than one of abusive language, for which he said he was provoked by others. (Note: Testimony of Nicholas Rodgers, carpenter.,) Rodgers was found guilty on all counts and he was dismissed from naval service.

Aurora remained on the North America and West Indies Station until sometime in 1790 when she paid off.

=== French Revolutionary war ===
In June 1792, Aurora was back at Portsmouth undergoing another, much larger repair, which took around 18 months to complete. She was recommissioned in September 1793 under William Essington and then in early 1794 she was among the British vessels present when Sir David Dundas captured the town of San Fiorenzo (San Fiurenzu) in the Gulf of St. Florent in Corsica. There the British found the French frigate Minerve on 19 February 1794, and were able to refloat her. They then took her into service as a 38-gun frigate under the name St Fiorenzo. Aurora shared in the prize money for both St Fiorenzo and for the naval stores captured in the town. On 12 July 1794, Aurora captured the republican cutter, Narcisse. Sir Richard King became Aurora's captain in January 1795 then later, command passed to Charles Garnier. On 13 April 1796, Aurora with HMS Phoebe, recaptured the brig, Integrity. When Garnier drowned in December 1796, Philip Wodehouse briefly became Aurora's captain before command passed to Henry Digby in January 1797. Aurora then spent around two years in the Mediterranean attacking French and Spanish shipping.

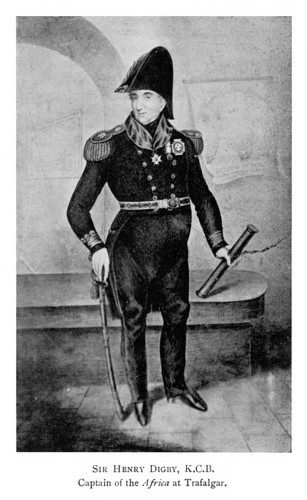
Henry Digby, captain of Aurora between January 1797 and November 1798

In March 1797, Digby's ship was off Cape Finisterre when she ran into a French privateer, Neptune, out of Nantes. After an eight-hour chase, in which six of her sixteen guns were thrown overboard, Neptune was brought to action and captured.

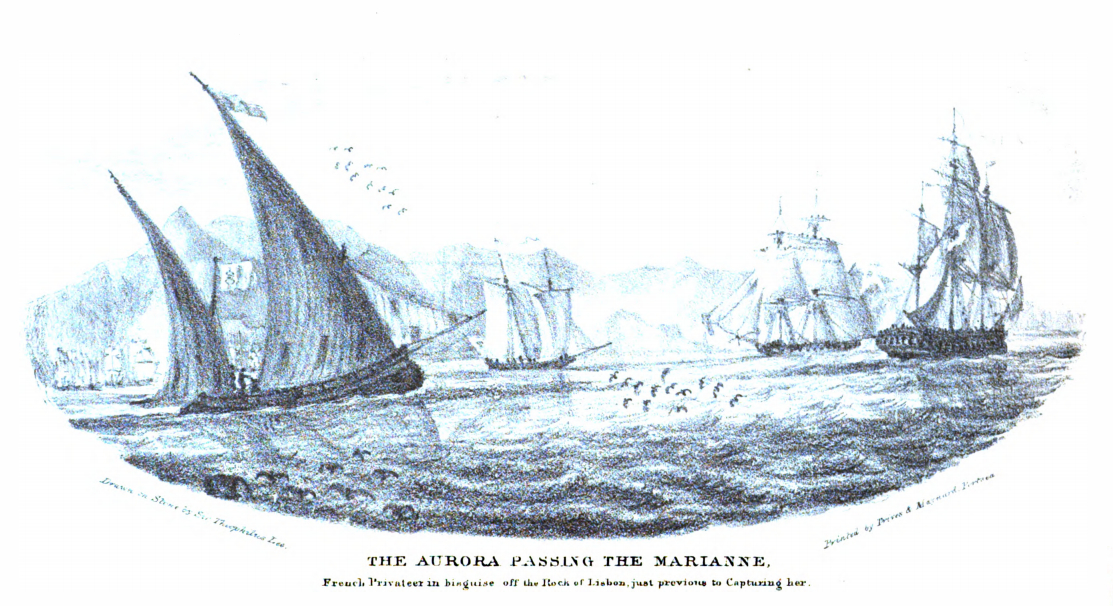
The Aurora passing the Marianne just previous to capturing her, from a sketch by John Theophilus Lee

Whilst cruising off the coast of Portugal on 13 August 1797, Aurora encountered and captured the Marie Anne, a 14-gun privateer, 21 days out of Nantes. By 17 September 1797, Aurora had arrived in the river Tagus at Lisbon, having captured two more French privateers on the way: the 12-gun L’Aigle and the 14-gun L’Espiegle, both out of Rochelle. Aurora captured two Spanish brigs on 16 October but one was in such poor condition that two days later, Digby ordered her sunk. On 28 October, she captured the French ship, L'Amiable Sophie, then the following day, Digby was again forced to sink one of his prizes when, off Cape Ortegal, he captured three Spanish coasting vessels, one of which was deemed unfit to sail. In November, Aurora was involved in a nine-hour chase off Cape Roxent, Madiera, which resulted in the capture of a French schooner, L'Aventure.

On 17 January 1798, the Aurora, still under Digby, captured a Spanish schooner, La Casualided, off Cape Finisterre. The six-gun privateer had left Caracas 47 days previous with a cargo of cocoa. On her return from escorting a Newfoundland convoy, Aurora captured, on 8 May, a Spanish brig out of Havana which had on board government dispatches. While cruising off the north-west coast of Spain, on 6 June 1798, Aurora spotted and chased an unidentified, armed vessel which sought shelter in the fog, in the bay of Curmes. With Aurora providing covering fire, two of her boats were sent in to investigate and, on discovering a brigantine and a schooner, burned the former and scuttled the latter, before returning with three of their number wounded.

On 19 June 1798, Aurora chased an 18 or 20-gun ship and five merchant vessels past Cape Prior, east into Cedeira harbour. Entering the harbour at 16.30, Aurora came under immediate fire from the fort on the north-east of the town, which was returned. After damaging the fort and driving two of the convoy ashore, the wind dropped and Digby, fearing the ship would become trapped, had the ship's boats launched in order to tow her to safety. Three days later, Aurora was in the Bay of Biscay, off Cape Machichicao, when she spotted a privateer of around 20 guns which, at 15.30, hoisted French colours and ran towards the land with Aurora in pursuit. The privateer was found anchored beneath the guns of a fort but Digby brought his ship within half a gun shot and gave the Frenchman four broadsides, cutting her cables and leaving her dismasted on the shore with the sea breaking over her. On 6 September 1798 Aurora in company with Nymphe and the privateer Lord Hawke captured the Spanish ship L'Edad de Oro, which had sailed from La Guaira, Venezuela, with a cargo of cocoa, bound for Corunna, she was captured just short of her destination. The next day Aurora and Nymphe recaptured the sloop Charlotte of London, originally bound for Newfoundland. In November 1798, Aurora assisted in the capture of Minorca.

==== Capture of Minorca ====
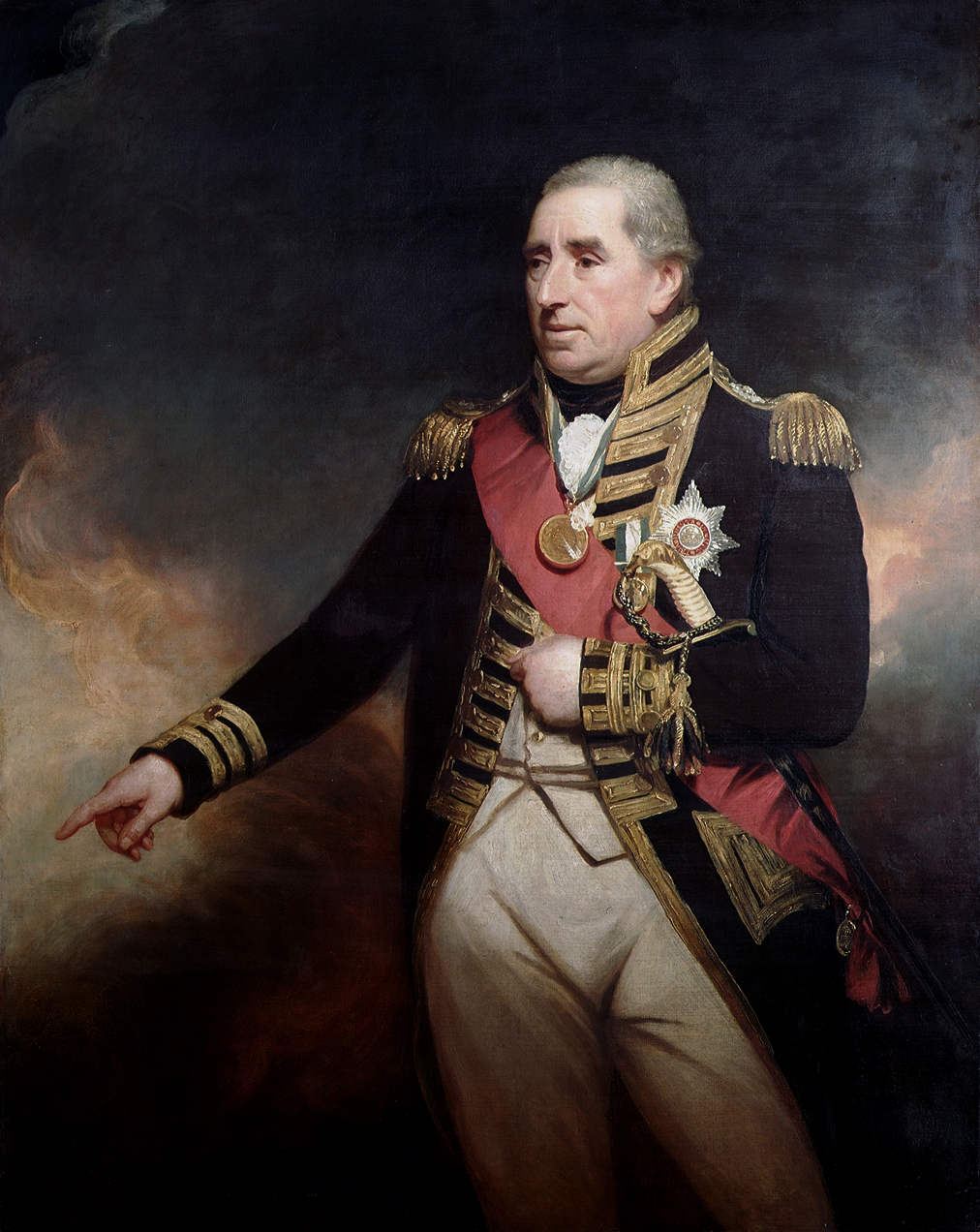
Admiral John Thomas Duckworth, commander of Britain's naval force during the capture of Minorca in 1798.

On 7 November, a squadron under John Thomas Duckworth arrived off Minorca, comprising the seventy-fours, Leviathan and Centaur, the forty-fours, Argo and Dolphin, Aurora, captained by Thomas Gordon Caulfield, the 20-gun, HMS Cormorant, the 16-gun, Peterel, three armed transports, a cutter, and a number of merchant transports.

Initially the plan was to land troops, under General Charles Stuart, at Fournella but adverse wind conditions prevented this. Instead, two battleships cruised up and down outside the harbour, creating a diversion while Aurora, Cormorant and Argo escorted the transports a little further along the coast to Addaya creek. The creek was guarded by a battery of eight twelve-pound guns which let off a single salvo before it was destroyed by those manning it. There was no further opposition and by 11.00, a battalion of troops had been landed, which immediately took possession of the nearby high ground. Using guns taken from three of the squadron's ships, these troops were able tor drive off two divisions of Spaniards who were hoping to regain control of the recently deserted battery at the mouth of the creek. The remaining British troops, their provisions, eight 6-pound guns and two howitzers were all safely ashore by 18.00 that evening. Later that evening, Centaur and Leviathan, having been anchored off the entrance to the creek during the landings, returned to Fournella with Argo whilst Aurora, Cormorant and seven transports proceeded to create a diversion of Port Mahon.

On returning to Fournella, it was discovered that the defending garrison had left. Supplies were left for the army which, having driven the enemy from Addaya, then marched to Mercadal which it entered without resistance. On 9 November, a detachment of 300 British troops captured Mahón and removed a boom across the harbour which had been preventing access to Aurora and Cormorant. On the evening of 11 November, Duckworth heard of a small squadron of Spanish ships seen heading towards the island. He immediately left Fournella to investigate, taking with him Leviathan, Centaur, Argo, and three armed transports. On 13 November, just off Ciudadella, Duckworth caught up with the five Spanish ships which included Peterel, captured the previous day. Chase was given and Peterel was recaptured but the remainder escaped. On returning to Fournella on 16 November, Duckworth learnt that the whole island had capitulated the previous day and was under British control.

=== Napoleonic wars ===
In July 1805, Aurora was commissioned under George Elliot, who returned with her to the Mediterranean. George Seymour became her captain in June 1806 then in 1808, command passed to John Duer who sailed her to Jamaica that April, where she became part of Charles Dashwood's squadron that took possession of the town of Samaná in November 1808. The action was carried out, partly in a bid to protect British merchant shipping in the area and partly to aid the Spanish, who were by then allies of Britain, in their siege of Santo Domingo through a naval blockade of the city. Dashwood in the 36-gun La Franchise was accompanied by Aurora, Daedalus, Reindeer and the brig, Port Mahon, when they captured the town of Samaná, on the east end of the island, against minimal resistance on 11 November. Aurora took two 5-gun privateers, Guerriere and Exchange found in the port. Three merchant vessels were also taken and some partially erected French batteries discovered. The French garrison at Santo Domingo held out until 2 July 1809 however, when a large force under Hugh Lyle Carmichael was sent to expel them. William Pryce Cumby in the 64-gun Polyphemus assisted by Aurora, escorted the squadron of sloops and transports that carried the troops and artillery for these operations. Shortly after the British troops were landed, the city capitulated.

Lloyd's List reported in February 1809 that Aurora had captured the French schooner Venus and the merchant vessel Caroline. Venus was sailing from Guadaloupe to Bordeaux; Aurora sent her into Jamaica. Caroline, captured on 12 December 1808, of 400 tons (bm), 10 guns, and 26 men, was on her way from Guadaloupe to Rochefort when Aurora captured her and sent her into Jamaica. Caroline was carrying a cargo of sugar, oil, copper, etc.

== Fate ==
In December 1810, Aurora returned to Chatham where she was laid up, then on 3 November 1814, she was sold for £1,620.

== In popular culture ==
- The frigate features in a contemporary work of naval fiction Mr Midshipman Easy by Captain Frederick Marryat.
