= Deputy Comptroller of the Navy (Navy Board) =

Office of the Deputy Comptroller of the Navy
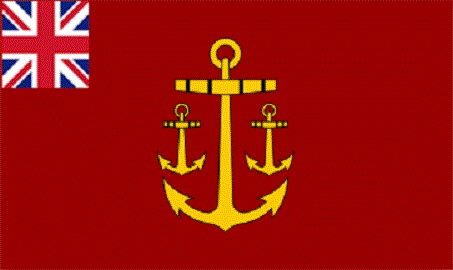
- Flag of the Navy Board shown for illustrative purposes
- Department of the Admiralty
- Member of: Navy Board (1793-1832)
- Appointer: Prime Minister; Subject to formal approval by the King-in-Council
- Term length: Not fixed (usually for life)
- Inaugural holder: Captain Edward Le Cras
- Formation: 1793-1816, 1829-1832

The Deputy Comptroller of the Navy was a principal member of the Navy Board of the Royal Navy who was responsible for chairing the Committee of Correspondence and managing all internal and external communications of the Navy Board from 1793 to 1816 and then again from 1829 to 1832. He was based at the Navy Office.

== History ==
The post of the Deputy Comptroller of the Navy was created in 1793 primarily to relive the Comptroller of the Navy of some of his duties. In 1796 the offices of Clerk of the Acts and the three Comptrollers of Accounts (stores, victualling, treasurers) were abolished following an internal inquiry and audit of the Navy Boards business the Board reconstituted and then placed under the supervision of three Committees, for Correspondence, Accounts and Stores. The deputy comptroller was appointed Chairman of the Committee of Correspondence whose members included the former Clerk of the Acts, the Surveyor of the Navy and the commissioner for the Transport Service. Also in attendance at meetings was the Secretary to the Navy Board. The post was temporarily suspended in 1816, then left vacant until 1829 it then existed until 1832 when the Navy Board was abolished and its functions were merged with the Board of Admiralty's.

== List of deputy comptrollers ==
Included:

- Captain Edward Le Cras, 11 February 1793 – 20 December 1793
- Captain Sir Andrew Snape Hamond, 7 March 1794 – 24 September 1794
- Captain Sir Samuel Marshall, 25 September 1794 – 2 October 1795
- Captain Charles Hope, 21 October 1795 – 20 January 1801
- Henry Duncan, 21 January 1801 – 19 June 1806
- Sir Robert Barlow, 20 June 1806 – 2 December 1808
- Sir Francis Hartwell, Bt, 3 December 1808 – 21 August 1814
- Captain William Shield, 22 August 1814 – December 1814
- Sir Thomas Byam Martin, January 1815 – February 1816

Note: the post was temporarily suspended and left vacant

- Hon. Henry Legge, 4 May 1829 – 20 October 1830
- Hon. Robert Dundas, 21 October 1830 – 1832

== Sources ==
- Clowes. Laird. William. (1899), The Royal Navy, A History from the Earliest Times to Present, Volume IV, Sampson Lowe Marston and Co, London.
- Office-Holders in Modern Britain: Volume 7, Navy Board Officials 1660–1832, ed. J M Collinge (London, 1978), British History Online http://www.british-history.ac.uk/office-holders/vol7 [accessed 9 June 2017].
