= George Parsons (shipbuilder) =

English shipbuilder

George Parsons (baptised 21 September 1749 – 16 April 1812) was an English shipbuilder, primarily based in Hampshire during the 18th and early 19th centuries.

== Biography ==
He was born in Poole, the son of George Parsons. His father moved to Portsmouth to take up a position as a shipwright in the Royal Dockyard in 1740. George junior began as a Quarter Boy entering 18 June 1744. He continued in the Royal Dockyard until, as a 2nd shipwright he was discharged 6 April 1763. His move to Bursledon therefore probably occurred later that year and certainly by 1764. His first employer there was a shipowner, Thomas Cooper, and a few years later, Philemon Ewer, a descendant of the pre-eminent local shipbuilder of the previous generation. He almost certainly moved into his own yard by 1774 at Bursledon Point on the Hamble, though the advertisement in 1776 for "a good burdensome well built Sloop, about 30 tons, just finished" suggested this might have been built in partnership with Ewer. By late 1778 he was ready to build on his own account when a Navy Board letter of 19 December refers to an offer from him to build 'a Ship of 32 guns'.

The warships he built there were:

1780	HMS Fox	32 guns
1781	HMS Quebec	32 guns
1782	HMS Ardent	64 guns
1783	HMS Phoenix	36 guns
1786	HMS Elephant	74 guns
1786	HMS Dover	44 guns
1794	HMS Galatea	32 guns
1795	HMS Diligence	16 guns
1797	HMS Cambrian	40 guns
1798	HMS Penelope	36 guns
1800	HMS Jason	36 guns
1801	HMS Resistance	36 guns
1803	HMS Tribune	36 guns
1805	HMS Fly	22 guns
1805	HMS Apollo	38 guns
1807	HMS Horatio	38 guns

In addition to the above HMS Rattler was launched at Northam in 1795. The original contractor, Thomas Raymond went bankrupt in 1793 and Parsons took it over for which he received £3000 from the Admiralty. Quebec and Ardent were built in partnership with Robert Stares.

He leased his yard with William Raingecroft from William Allen Thackthwaite, the lease falling due for renewal at the end of 1807. For whatever reason the new lease went to Raingecroft and Richard Stiles Blake. However, ample notice must have been given as he acquired another site downstream and on the opposite shore at Warsash. With the assistance of his son John, and his grandson John Rubie he moved his entire yard including demolishing and re-erecting the large graving shed and mold loft. Two elm launch ways were built as were seven houses to help accommodate his men, plus a blacksmith's shop and an inn. Warship building resumed after an inevitable hiatus and the following ships were built there:

1808	HMS Peruvian	18 guns
1810	HMS Hotspur	36 guns
1809	HMS Theban	36 guns
1812	HMS Nymphe	36 guns

He was one of the original shareholders in the company formed in 1797 to build a road bridge between Bursledon and Swanwick. When the construction was in danger of collapse he won the contract in 1809 for the reconstruction to the improved design of John Rennie and this lasted until a modern bridge replaced it in the 1930s.

He died on 16 April 1812, three days after the launching of Nymphe, at Salterns, his home in Bursledon. A contemporary obituary remarked that "He has left a high character for inflexible, undeviating integrity, and, the punctuality and uprightness with which he performed his Contracts with Government, in the building of ships of war for the Navy, gained him the esteem of the Navy Board, and render his death a public loss."

He is remembered especially for HMS Elephant which became, by chance, Nelson's flagship at the Battle of Copenhagen when Nelson transferred his flag from the 98-gun HMS St George as Elephant's shallower draught made her more suitable for the shallow waters around Copenhagen. It was therefore on the deck of Elephant that the legend of Nelson putting the telescope to his blind eye arose. The postcard of the monument to George Parsons in St Leonard's, Bursledon dates from around 1930 and is believed to have been annotated by his great-great-grandson John Denham Parsons who was a regular visitor to the village and local historian before the II World War. He gives Elephant's dimensions as Gun Deck 168 ft, Length of Keel 139 ft 10in, breadth 47 ft, depth 19 ft 9in and tonnage 1617. Gunnery is given as 28 guns of 3 1/2 tons each of 6-inch bore on the lower deck, 28 guns of 5 bore on the main deck and 18 9 pounders with a 4 bore on the poop with carronades as well. Two thousand oak trees are said to have been used in the construction. The full complement was 600 officers and men.

The frigate HMS Nymphe which was launched at Warsash three days before his death went, almost immediately, across the Atlantic to assist the naval effort during the War of 1812. This plaque commemorates one action undertaken by Nymphe in October 1812 at Rockport, Mass. The citation reads 'OLD STONE FORT Site of a fort erected by public subscription as protection against British warships during the war of 1812, captured in a sneak attack and dismantled by frigate NYMPH. Ammunition gone, all nine sea fencibles taken prisoner, the townsmen hurled rocks, using their stockings as slings.'
