= James Henry Duncan =

James Henry Duncan may refer to:

- James H. Duncan (1793–1869), American politician
- James Duncan (athlete) (1887–1955)
