= Henry Duncan (Royal Navy officer, born 1735) =

Captain Henry Duncan
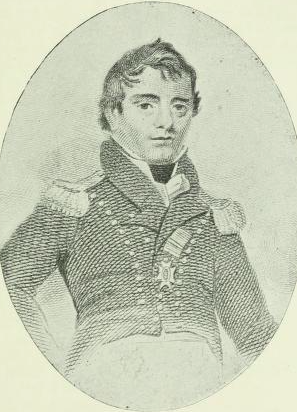
- Born: 24 November 1735; Dundee, Scotland
- Died: 7 October 1814 (aged 78); Dartmouth, England
- Spouse: Mary French
- Children: 3
- Military career
- Allegiance: United Kingdom
- Branch: Royal Navy
- Service years: 1755–1811
- Rank: Captain
- Commands: HMS Terror; HMS Wasp; HMS Eagle; HMS Medea; HMS Ambuscade; HMS Victory; Resident Commissioner, Halifax; Resident Commissioner, Sheerness; Deputy Comptroller of the Navy
- Conflicts: Seven Years' War; Louisbourg Expedition; Siege of Louisbourg; Capture of Gorée; Battle of Lagos; Capture of Belle Île; American Revolutionary War; Battle of Cape Henry; Battle of the Chesapeake; Third Relief of Gibraltar; Battle of Cape Spartel; French Revolutionary Wars; Napoleonic Wars

Captain Henry Duncan (24 November 1735 – 7 October 1814)^{[a]} was an officer of the Royal Navy, who saw service in the American War of Independence. Duncan was born in Dundee, Scotland to Alexander Duncan, Town Clerk of Dundee, and Isobel Crawford.

== Career ==
Duncan began his sea life in the merchant service, possibly in that of the East India Company, but entered the Royal Navy on in 1755 joining HMS Nassau. Duncan later joined HMS Newark. On 3 January 1759, Duncan passed his examination for lieutenant and joined HMS America. Duncan then joined HMS Prince in Gibraltar, but was soon transferred to HMS Namur and then HMS Barfleur.

He married Mary French in Dartmouth, on 27 November 1761. He participated in the capture of Havana in 1762 and was moved to HMS Temeraire. During this time he had two children, Isabella (born 23 August 1764) and Arthur French (born 9 February 1769). Duncan already had an older son, Henry, who later served in the Navy from 1781 until being lost off the coast of Newfoundland in 1802 with HMS Scout.

On 26 May 1768, Duncan was promoted to commander and joined HMS Wasp. Soon after he was promoted to captain. In January, 1776, William Howe was appointed as Commander-in-Chief of British forces in North America and chose Duncan to join him as flag captain of HMS Eagle. His career in North America lasted for the next six to seven years. On the commands of General Howe, Duncan commanded an invasion fleet of 26 ships carrying 2,000 men led by General William Tryon from New York to Westport, Connecticut, to raid Continental Army supply depots in Danbury, Connecticut, on 22 April 1777, resulting in the Battle of Ridgefield.

Duncan later returned to Europe to participate in the relief of Gibraltar in 1781.

He was appointed Commissioner at Halifax. He participated in the North British Society. He was appointed to the Nova Scotia Council in 1788, resigning in 1801. Duncan remained at Halifax until 1799, when he returned to England, to be appointed Commissioner at Sheerness, and Deputy-Comptroller of the Navy in January, 1801. He retired from the post in 1806 and resided at Dartmouth until his death on 7 October 1814. His widow Mary survived until 25 September 1823.

== Notes ==
a. The parish records of Dundee indicate that the birth date of "24 November 1735" is incorrect

The Parish Records of Dundee, Angus, Scotland
Born 24 January 1739 Baptised 27 January 1739
Henry son of Mr Alexr Duncan, Clerk and Isabel Crawford
In commemoration of Henry Crawford late of Monorgan, grandfather, Henry Crawford of Monorgan, uncle

Military offices
Preceded by Andrew Snape Hamond	Resident Commissioner, Halifax; 1783–1799	Succeeded by Isaac Coffin
Preceded by Isaac Coffin	Resident Commissioner, Halifax; 1800–1803	Succeeded by John Nicholson Inglefield
