= Philip Wodehouse (Royal Navy officer) =

British admiral (1773–1838)

Vice-Admiral The Honourable Philip Wodehouse
- Born: 16 July 1773
- Died: 21 January 1838 (aged 64)
- Relatives: John Wodehouse, 1st Baron Wodehouse (father)
- Military career
- Allegiance: United Kingdom
- Branch: Royal Navy
- Service years: c. 1794–1838
- Rank: Vice-Admiral
- Commands: HMS Albacore; HMS Peterel; HMS Aurora; HMS Mignonne; HMS Volage; HMS Brilliant; HMS Iris; HMS Resistance; Harwich Sea Fencibles; HMS Intrepid; HMS Cumberland; Resident Commissioner, Halifax
- Conflicts: French Revolutionary Wars; Napoleonic Wars; Invasion of Naples; Battle of Maguelone

Vice-Admiral Philip Wodehouse (16 July 1773 – 21 January 1838) was a Royal Navy officer. A son of John Wodehouse, 1st Baron Wodehouse, he joined the navy some time before 1794. In 1796 he was promoted to commander and then captain, commanding sloops and frigates in the Mediterranean Fleet. Wodehouse cycled through a series of frigate commands towards the end of the French Revolutionary Wars, including HMS Mignonne which he had to burn as useless in 1797. In 1803, while commanding HMS Resistance, his ship was wrecked off Cape St Vincent. Wodehouse subsequently commanded several ships of the line, including HMS Cumberland in the Mediterranean where in 1809 he fought at the Battle of Maguelone. Wodehouse was appointed Resident Commissioner, Halifax, in 1811 and served there until the dockyard was closed in 1819. He was promoted to rear-admiral later in the year. Wodehouse saw no further active service, but was promoted to vice-admiral in 1830.

== Naval career ==
Philip Wodehouse was born on 16 July 1773. He was the second of four sons of Sir John Wodehouse, 6th Baronet, who would go on to be created Baron Wodehouse in 1797, and Sophia née Berkeley, a relative of the Earls of Berkeley. At some point early in his life Wodehouse began a career in the Royal Navy.

=== French Revolutionary Wars ===
The first recorded service of Wodehouse in the Royal Navy is his promotion to lieutenant on 6 January 1794, after which he served in the Mediterranean Fleet under Vice-Admiral Sir John Jervis. Early in 1796 Wodehouse was promoted to commander and given command of the 16-gun sloop HMS Albacore on the Downs Station. Soon afterwards he was selected to move to the command of a ship of the same type, HMS Peterel, in the Mediterranean, to supersede her current commander, Commander Bartholomew James.

Peterel was serving in Captain Horatio Nelson's squadron off Genoa, and Wodehouse spent four months chasing Peterel around the Mediterranean before he was able to catch up with her and take over from James in November. On 23 December Wodehouse was promoted to captain in the 28-gun frigate HMS Aurora, still in the Mediterranean, after her previous commander drowned. He stayed in Aurora only very briefly, moving to the 32-gun frigate HMS Mignonne, also stationed in the Mediterranean, later in December. Mignonne was an ex-French ship that had been captured by the British at the Siege of Toulon in 1793, and she was found to be so decrepit that Wodehouse was forced to burn her as useless at Portoferraio on 31 July 1797.

Wodehouse was next given command of the 24-gun frigate HMS Volage, a recently captured French privateer, in October 1798. He sailed Volage to join the Leeward Islands Station in March 1799, based at Jamaica. He relinquished command in around September. Wodehouse did not receive a new command until April 1801 when he joined the 28-gun frigate HMS Brilliant; Wodehouse then moved to the 32-gun frigate HMS Iris in September. He commanded Iris only briefly, with his position in command being taken by a lieutenant some time before the end of the year. Wodehouse was then given command of the 36-gun frigate HMS Resistance in May 1802. Resistance was stationed off Weymouth for the summer, attending to the visiting George III. In the following year Resistance was ordered out to the Mediterranean; early in the morning of 31 May the ship was wrecked on the Portuguese coast near Cape St Vincent after striking rocks. Wodehouse and the crew were rescued.

=== Napoleonic Wars ===
Now without a ship, in spring 1804 Wodehouse was instead appointed to superintend the Sea Fencibles, a coastal defence force, at Harwich. He continued in that post until August 1805, at which point he was given command of the 64-gun ship of the line HMS Intrepid which had recently completed a refit at Deptford Dockyard. Wodehouse took Intrepid out to the Mediterranean, where in June 1806 she formed part of Rear-Admiral Sidney Smith's squadron supporting the defence against the French invasion of Naples. Towards the end of 1807 Wodehouse again moved commands, commissioning the brand new 74-gun ship of the line HMS Cumberland in October. Cumberland sailed to join Vice-Admiral Lord Collingwood's Mediterranean Fleet on 30 January 1808. By February 1809 Wodehouse's ship was serving in a squadron under Rear-Admiral Sir Richard Strachan, who commanded the Rochefort blockade.

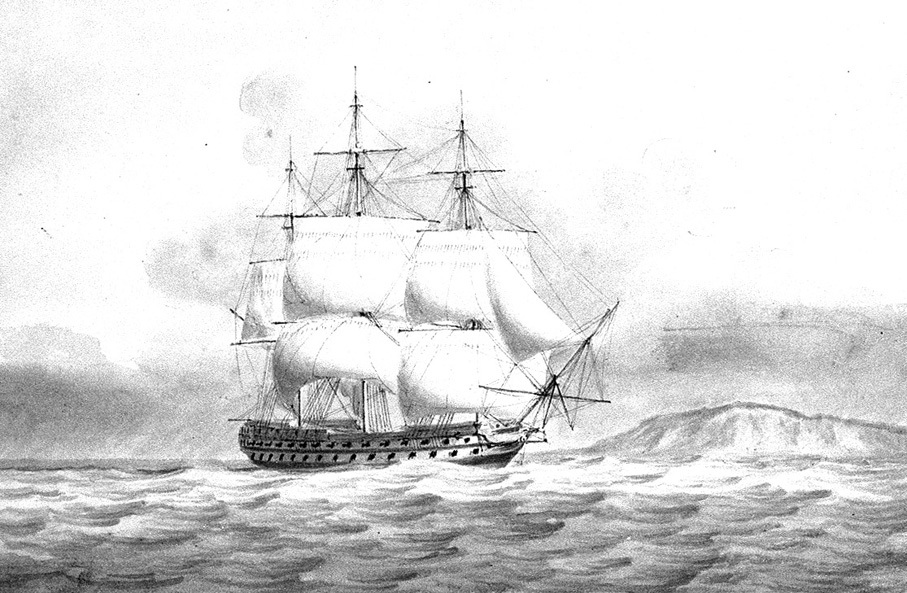
HMS Cumberland at sea

Having returned to the Mediterranean, on 21 October Cumberland was serving under Collingwood blockading Toulon when François-André Baudin escaped that port with a squadron including three ships of the line. Baudin was attempting to escort supplies and reinforcements to relieve Barcelona. He was discovered by the British on 23 October and Collingwood ordered Rear-Admiral George Martin to chase the French squadron with eight of the best sailing ships in the fleet, which included Cumberland. At 3 p.m. Baudin split his warships away from the convoy and sailed towards the French coast. Martin and six of his ships, including Cumberland, discovered Baudin and four of his ships early in the morning on 24 October. The British chased Baudin through the day but had to stop when night began to fall as they were dangerously close to the coastline. They made contact with the French again on the following day; two of the ships succeeded in getting into the harbour at Cette, but at 11:45 a.m. the 80-gun ship of the line Robuste and 74-gun ship of the line Lion ran ashore at Frontignan. The French set the ships on fire and in the night of 26 October they both exploded.

Martin's squadron afterwards returned to Collingwood, who later in the month discovered that the convoy escorted by Baudin was in Rosas Bay. Captain Benjamin Hallowell was sent to capture or destroy the convoy, for which purpose he was given a squadron including Cumberland. In the night of 31 October Cumberland and the larger vessels of the squadron anchored off the bay and sent their small boats in with the squadron's brigs. The French force was defended by several small warships and was covered by soldiers on the beach and forts above it, but by daylight on 1 November all the ships had been either captured or destroyed. The British lost fifteen men killed and a further fifty wounded, of which the latter included three officers from Cumberland. Subsequently Cumberland was stationed off Sicily as part of the force protecting that island. Wodehouse continued with Cumberland in the Mediterranean until July 1811 when, having at some point been wounded, he handed over to Captain Robert Otway and withdrew from sea-service.

=== Commissioner at Halifax ===
Wodehouse was subsequently appointed Resident Commissioner, Halifax on 9 September 1811. This position, the senior-most of the Navy Board in Halifax, gave Wodehouse control over the Royal Naval Dockyard there; he was in command of all financial, administrative, building, and repair work relating to it. With the War of 1812 having begun, he oversaw a great expansion of the dockyard facilities which by 1814 were servicing 120 Royal Navy warships.

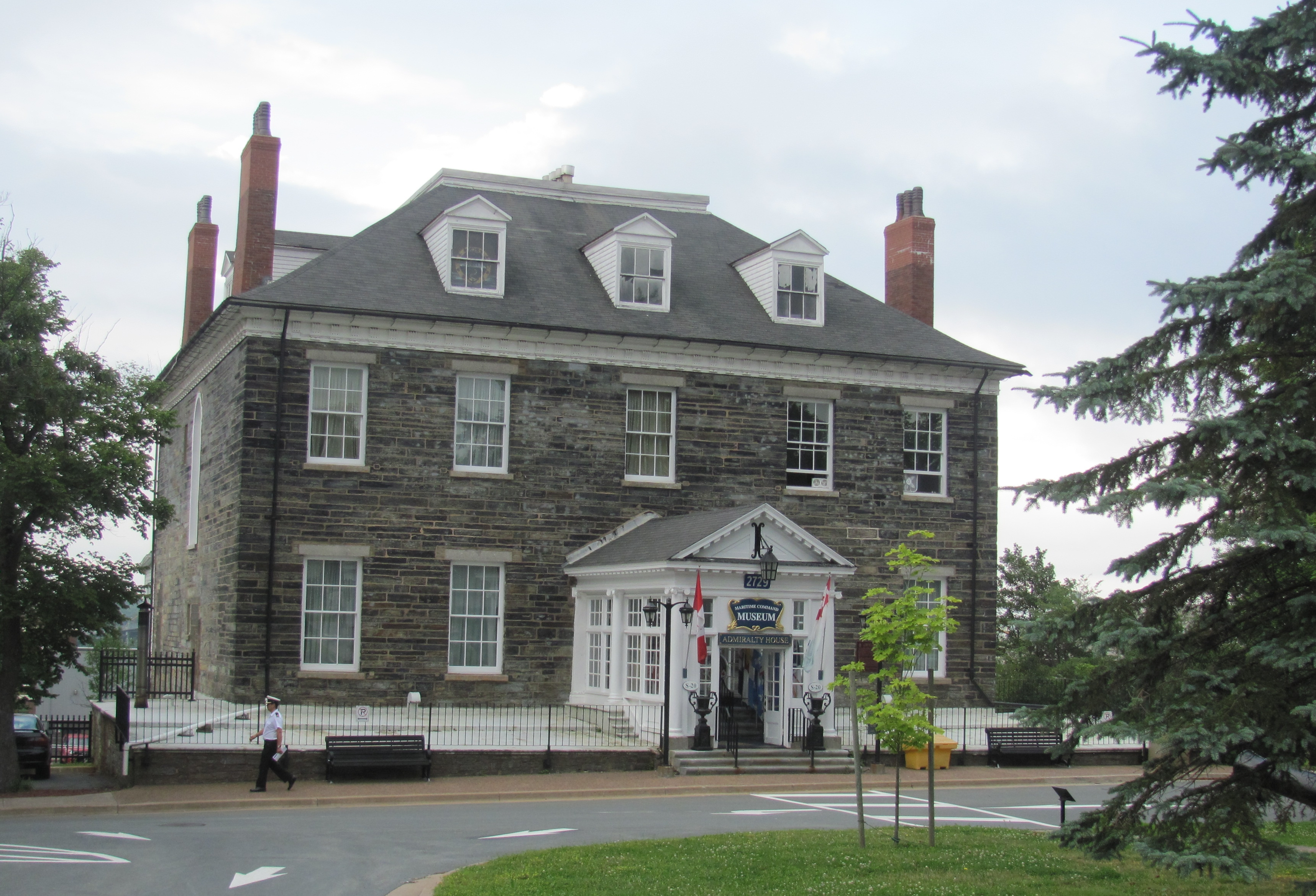
Admiralty House, Halifax

In around July 1813 Wodehouse was caught up in a dispute between the naval hospital's surgeon David Rowlands and the dispenser Robert Hume. Rowlands, having attempted to bully and coerce Hume, demanded a board of inquiry to investigate the latter's conduct. At the inquiry Rowlands also accused Wodehouse of being "violently his enemy". The court was unimpressed with this and subsequently abandoned the inquiry. Wodehouse then requested a second inquiry be held to investigate the running of the naval hospital. In this Rowlands accused Wodehouse of "gross neglect of duty", for which the former later apologised in January 1814. The court found against Rowlands but he continued at Halifax for another six years.

By 1815 both the War of 1812 and the Napoleonic Wars had ended. Wodehouse began a campaign to convince the Navy Board to release funds to him for repairs, arguing that most of the dockyard was "in the most defective state". Very few repairs were sanctioned by the Navy Board during Wodehouse's tenure, and in March 1819 he was still bargaining with it, suggesting that the repairs could be done gradually to save money. In November 1815 Wodehouse supervised the start of the construction of Admiralty House for the use of the commanders-in-chief of the North America Station. The house was completed in 1819.

The Navy Board decided in May the same year to close the dockyard and use its remaining facilities as a supply depot, it being surplus to peacetime requirements. This signalled the end of Wodehouse's tenure at Halifax and soon after transport was arranged for him and his family to return to Britain. Described by the historian Julian Gwyn as "intelligent, warm, and kind-hearted", with the closing Wodehouse received testimonials of affection from Halifax town, Nova Scotia Council, and his dockyard officers and clerks. With most of his workers becoming unemployed when the yard closed, Wodehouse lobbied successfully to secure their pensions and for those who lived on site to continue to do so.

The historian Harry Piers suggests that while at Halifax Wodehouse had his portrait painted by Robert Field, but as of 1927 no such portrait had been located. Having left Halifax, on 12 August 1819 Wodehouse was promoted to rear-admiral. (Note: Full dates of promotion: Rear-admiral of the blue 12 August 1819, rear-admiral of the white 27 May 1825, vice-admiral of the blue 22 July 1830, vice-admiral of the white 10 January 1837) He had no further active service within the Royal Navy after this, but was promoted to vice-admiral on 22 July 1830. He died on 21 January 1838.

== Personal life ==
While serving at Halifax Wodehouse married Mary Hay Cameron, the second daughter of Charles Cameron, Governor of the Bahamas, on 7 May 1814. Together the couple had seven children:

- Margaret Hay Wodehouse (b. 19 March 1816)
- Colonel Edwin Wodehouse CB ADC (17 April 1817 – 6 October 1870), Royal Artillery officer and father of Sir Frederick Wodehouse
- Jane Wodehouse (b. 9 January 1821)
- Agnes Wodehouse (b. 22 June 1822)
- Eleanor Mary Wodehouse (b. 28 May 1824)
- Reverend Constantine Griffith Wodehouse (b. 31 March 1827), rector of Mongewell
- Reverend Philip Cameron Wodehouse (b. 22 January 1837), chaplain at Hampton Court Palace

== Notes and citations ==
=== Citations ===
Military offices
| Preceded by John Nicholson Inglefield | Resident Commissioner, Halifax; 1811–1819 | Succeeded by Vacant; Replaced by Naval Storekeeper and Agent Victualler in 1832 |
