= Action of 5 September 1782 =

Naval battle of the American Revolution

- Part of the American Revolutionary War
Date	5 September 1782
Location	135 leagues East of Long Island
Result	Indecisive

Belligerents
France	Great Britain

Commanders and leaders
Latouche; Vallongue	

Strength
2 frigates: Aigle; Gloire	74-gun HMS Hector

Casualties and losses
Aigle: 4 killed, 13 wounded (4 mortally); Gloire: 2 killed, 2 wounded; Total: 10 dead, 11 wounded.	Nine men killed and 33 wounded

The action of 5 September 1782 took place during the American War of Independence between two French Navy frigates, Aigle and Gloire, and a lone British 74-gun ship of the line HMS Hector. In a two-day battle, the two frigates severely damaged Hector and failed to capture her only when a British squadron appeared on the horizon. The French withdrew, but Hector foundered a few days later after the 1782 Central Atlantic hurricane.

== Background ==
The Franco-American alliance in the American War of Independence, resulted in France providing a considerable contribution to the naval operations in the conflict. France and Britain fought to control shipping lanes and supply their side on the American continent, while conducting support operations and landings. In consequence, both sides often used warships as transports to ferry ammunition and other supplies, troops, funds, and officials; these might only be armed en flûte, depending on their cargo.

In April 1782 a joint Franco-Spanish fleet under Comte de Grasse attempted an invasion of Jamaica. The fleet met a British fleet under Sir George Rodney, who defeated them in the ensuing Battle of the Saintes. The British captured a number of ships, and in the summer, a convoy under Rear-Admiral Graves, on the 74-gun HMS Ramillies, with the 74-gun ships HMS Canada and HMS Centaur, and the 36-gun frigate HMS Pallas, escorted the prizes Ville de Paris, Glorieux, Hector and Ardent on the journey back to England. In early September Hector sailed to Halifax with her prize crew.

In August two French frigates departed Rochefort to transport funds and officials for Rochambeau's army: the 40-gun Aigle, under Captain de Latouche, and the 32-gun Gloire, under Captain de Vallongue. Both ships were crowded with officials.

== Action ==
In the night of 4 September 1782, at 135 leagues east of Long Island, Aigle and Gloire spotted a large ship sailing on a starboard tack under west winds, on a parallel course to theirs. Closing in, they identified her as a ship of the line; she was in fact Hector.

Gloire came under the wind of Aigle, and Hector hailed her. Aigle closed to the wind. Instead of imitating this manoeuvre, Gloire, fearing to expose her stern to the unknown ship, ran downwind and fired a broadside. Hector immediately replied in kind, and the two ships exchanged fire, still without knowing each other's identity.

At the first shot, Latouche ran downwind, but firing had ceased by the time Aigle caught up. Gloire and Hector were discussing their respective nationalities, and firing immediately resumed when they identified each other. Around 0415, Aigle replaced Gloire at Hector's beam, as Aigle mounted 24-pounder long guns as her main armament, while Gloire carried only 12-pounders. Latouche recognised his opponent as "at least a 64-gun ship."

The superiority of Hector's broadside led Latouche to want to board his opponent rather than continue to engage in an artillery duel, but Hector eluded him. At one point, Aigle and Hector were so close to one another than their gunners started hitting each other through the gunports using their ramrods. Meanwhile, Gloire circled Hector and raked her from stem to stern. The engagement continued until morning, when Hector appeared completely dismasted and almost unmanageable. Latouche saw the battle going in his favour until his lookouts detected several ships in the distance, at least one of which was unmistakably a ship of the line. Latouche then decided to break off the engagement and resume his mission.

== Aftermath ==
The ships Aigle and Gloire had spotted the rest of Rear-Admiral Thomas Graves's convoy. On 17 September the 1782 Central Atlantic hurricane caught the British. Hector survived, but much damaged in her encounter and in the hurricane, she sank on 4 October; the privateer Hawke saved 200 of her crew.

Latouche continued his mission and the French vessels successfully landed their passengers and funds in spite of British opposition. However, Aigle was lost immediately afterwards when she grounded in the Delaware River trying to escape a British squadron; Latouche was taken prisoner. The British were able to salvage her and take her into service as HMS Aigle. Gloire managed to escape, together with a prize, Racoon, that the French had captured on their way into the Delaware.

== See also ==
- A mass-produced faux commemorative plaque which details how "ON THIS SITE SEPT. 5, 1782 NOTHING HAPPENED."

== Notes, sources and references ==
=== References ===
- Guérin, Léon (1845). Les marins illustres de la France (in French). Belin-Leprieur et Morizot.
- Monaque, Rémi (2000). Les aventures de Louis-René de Latouche-Tréville, compagnon de La Fayette et commandant de l'Hermione (in French). Paris: SPM.
- Roche, Jean-Michel (2005). Dictionnaire des bâtiments de la flotte de guerre française de Colbert à nos jours. Vol. 1. Group Retozel-Maury Millau. ISBN 978-2-9525917-0-6. OCLC 165892922.
- Troude, Onésime-Joachim (1867). Batailles navales de la France (in French). Vol. 1. Challamel ainé.
