= HMS Terror (1759) =

History

Great Britain
- Name: HMS Terror
- Ordered: 21 September 1758
- Builder: John Barnard, Harwich
- Laid down: 7 October 1758
- Launched: 16 January 1759
- Fate: Sold 9 August 1774
- Notes: Hackman conflates this Union with the Union that had been Squirrel

Great Britain
- Name: Union
- Owner: c.1775:Peter Mestaer; 1776:J.Montgomery
- Acquired: 1774 by purchase
- Fate: Wrecked 20 May 1782

General characteristics
- Class & type: Infernal-class bomb ketch
- Tons burthen: 30183/94 or 305, or 315 (bm)
- Length: Overall:91 ft 6 in (27.9 m); Keel:74 ft 1 3/4 in (22.6 m)
- Beam: 27 ft 8 in (8.4 m)
- Depth of hold: 12 ft 1 in (3.7 m)
- Complement: RN bomb ketch:60; RN sloop:110
- Armament: RN bomb ketch: 6 × 6-pounder guns + 1 × 10" & 1 × 13" mortars; RN sloop: 14 × 6-pounder guns + 14 swivel guns; 1782:16 × 6-pounder guns

Plan of the Terror

HMS Terror was an 8-gun bomb ketch launched in 1759 for the British Royal Navy that it sold in 1774. New owners renamed her Union. She made two voyages as a Greenland whaler before becoming a London-based transport. She remained a transport until she was lost on 20 May 1782 off the Malabar coast of India.

== Royal Navy ==
Commander William Bennet commissioned Terror in January 1759 and sailed for the Mediterranean on 14 April. Commander Michael Kearny replaced Bennett in August. In April 1861 Commander St John Chinnery replaced Kearny, with Terror still serving in the Mediterranean. She was converted to a sloop in 1761 and then back to a bomb in 1762. she was paid-off in March 1763. She then underwent repairs but apparently was not recommissioned.

Disposal: Terror was sold on 9 August 1774 at Deptford for £665.

== Mercantile service ==
In the 1775 and 1776 whaling seasons, Union was engaged in the British northern whale fishery. On 12 June 1775 Union was at Greenland with two "fish".

On 2 August 1776 Union, Hudson, master, arrived at Gravesend from Greenland with four fish and 50 seals.

Union first appeared in online issues of Lloyd's Register (LR) in the issue for 1776.

Year	Master	Owner	Trade	Source & notes
1776	John Dryden; John Hudson	Peter Mestaer	London–Greenland; London transport	LR; thorough repair 1775
1778	J.Hudson	J.Montgomery	Cork transport	LR; thorough repair 1775
1783	Crawford	Montgomery	London transport	LR; thorough repair 1775

== Fate ==
Lloyd's List reported on 8 July 1783 that the transports Union and Prudence had been lost near Tellicherry. The entry for Union in the volume for LR for 1783 bore the annotation "Lost".

The wrecking occurred on 20 May 1782. Union and Prudence were serving as ordnance store ships when a storm drove them from Calicut roads. They were unable to clear Cotta Point and wrecked on the reefs there.
