= HMS Granado (1742) =

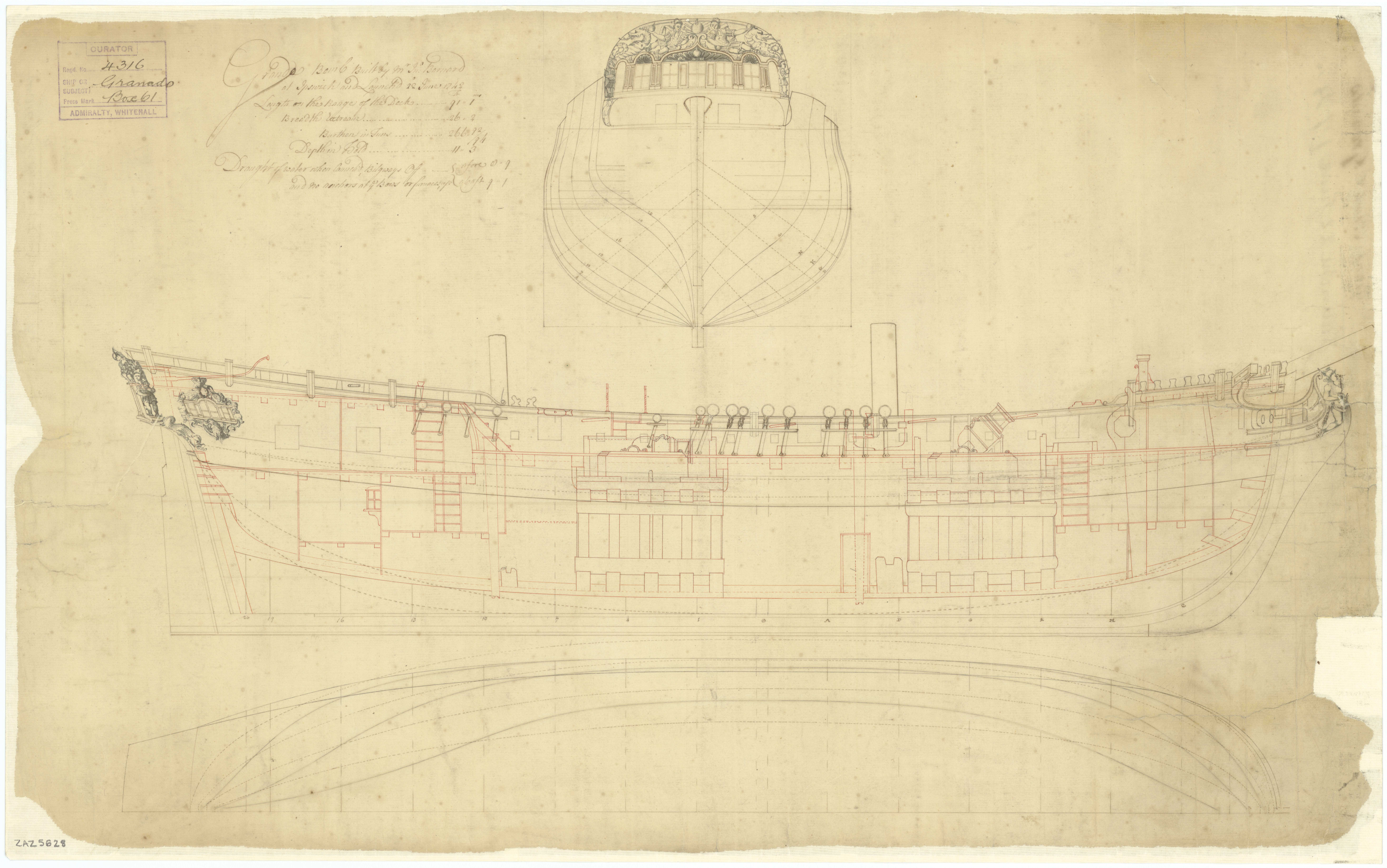
- The bomb vessel, HMS Granado

History

Great Britain
- Ordered: 14 September 1741
- Builder: John Barnard, Harwich
- Laid down: 18 November 1741
- Launched: 22 June 1742
- Commissioned: July 1742
- Out of service: Paid off, June 1763
- Fate: Sold 1763

General characteristics
- Tons burthen: 26892/94, or 300 (bm)
- Length: Overall: 91 ft 1 in (27.8 m); Keel: 73 ft 10 1/4 in (22.5 m)
- Beam: 26 ft 2 in (8.0 m)
- Depth of hold: 11 ft 4 in (3.5 m)
- Sail plan: Sloop
- Complement: 60
- Armament: Sloop: 10 × 4-pounder guns + 14 × ½-pounder swivel guns; Bomb: 8 × 4-pounder guns + 12 × ½-pounder swivel guns + 1 × 13" mortar + 1 × 10" mortar
- Notes: Permanent hatches over the mortar beds

History

Great Britain
- Name: Prince Frederick
- Acquired: 1763 by purchase
- Renamed: Prudence (circa 1775)
- Fate: Wrecked 20 May 1782

General characteristics
- Tons burthen: 250, or 289, or 300 (bm)
- Armament: 1779: 6 × 4-pounder guns; 1780: 8 × 4-pounder guns; 1781: 4 × 9-pounder + 4 × 6-pounder guns

HMS Granado was launched at Harwich in 1742, during the War of the Austrian Succession as a sloop-of-war. During this war she captured a French privateer. During the Seven Years' War she served both as a sloop and as a bomb vessel, and participated in naval operations off the coast of France and in the West Indies. When the Navy sold her in 1763 she became the mercantile Prince Frederick. Around 1775 she became the whaler Prudence, sailing in the British northern whale fishery. Around 1781 she became a government transport and was wrecked on 20 May 1782 on the coast of India.

== Royal Navy ==
Lieutenant Thomas Elliot commissioned Granado in July 1742 as a sloop for the Channel and North Sea. Commander Arthur Upton replaced Elliot in November. In January 1743 Commander William Parry replaced Elliot. She then served with Admiral John Norris's fleet in the Channel. Between April and May 1744 she escorted a convoy to Lisbon. In November she was under the command of Commander William Thomas.

Between May and September 1745 Granado was at Woolwich being fitted as a sloop. On 21 January 1746 Granado was under the command of Commander John Evans when she captured the French privateer Marianne, off Scarborough. Marianne was armed with 10 carriage guns and six swivel guns, and carried 80 men. Marianne struck after an engagement of an hour, during which she had eight men killed and 15 wounded. Granado had no casualties, but her sails and rigging were much damaged. Marianne had come from Calais and when captured had three ransomers on board. Grenado took Marianne into the Humber.

Between July and December 1746 Granado was at Sheerness, undergoing fitting. In August 1747 Commander Cornelius Smelt replaced Evans.

Granado was surveyed on 10 December 1748. A small repair at Woolwich followed in July–August 1749; she was then laid up.

Between February and May 1755 Granado was again fitted as a sloop. In April Commander Matthew Moore recommissioned her.

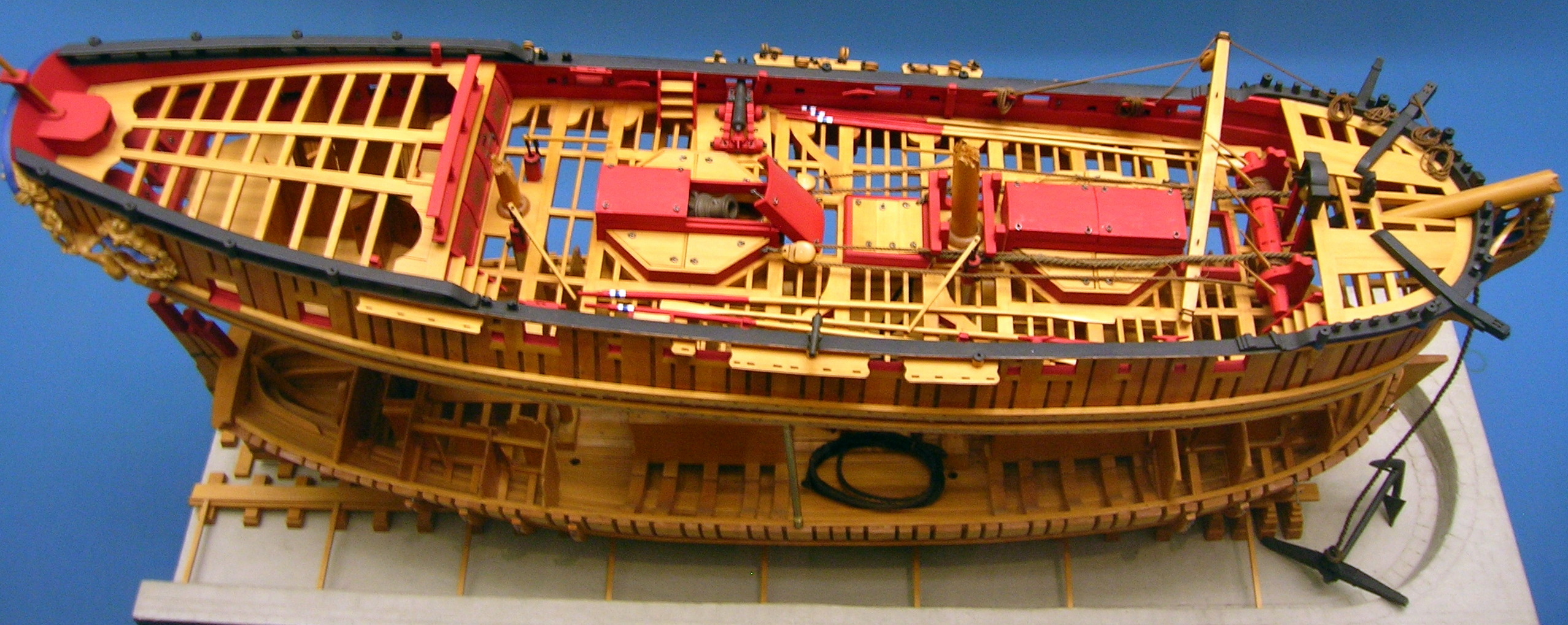
Model of Granado as a bomb vessel, at the National Maritime Museum, Greenwich

After the outbreak of the Seven Years' War, between August and September 1756, Granado was at Woolwich, being fitted as a bomb vessel. In August she was under the command of Commander John Fortescue. He sailed her for North America on 7 June 1757. Later in 1757 she was under the command of Lieutenant Robert Hathorn (acting).

In January 1858 she was under the command of Commander Samuel Uvedale (or James Mordale?). Later in 1758 she was at Saint-Malo, Cherbourg, and the Bay of St Cass. The British had invaded France in August and captured Cherbourg, from which they withdrew with captured war material and a ransom of £5000. In September elements of the British Army landed on the coast of Brittany, near Saint-Malo. The troops marched inland, before withdrawing to the Bay of St Cass. There, during the Battle of Saint Cast, the British rear-guard sustained significant losses in casualties and prisoners at the hands of the Irish Brigade, among other French forces, despite covering fire from the frigates and bomb vessels. Granado was among the many vessels of the naval squadron that shared in the proceeds of the capture on 18 August 1758 of the French privateer Guirland.

Granado sailed for the Leeward Islands on 12 November 1758, and arrived in time for the unsuccessful invasion of Martinique (1759), on 19 January 1759. The British force then sailed on to Guadeloupe. Between 22 January 1759 and 1 May, Granado participated in the invasion of Guadeloupe (1759).

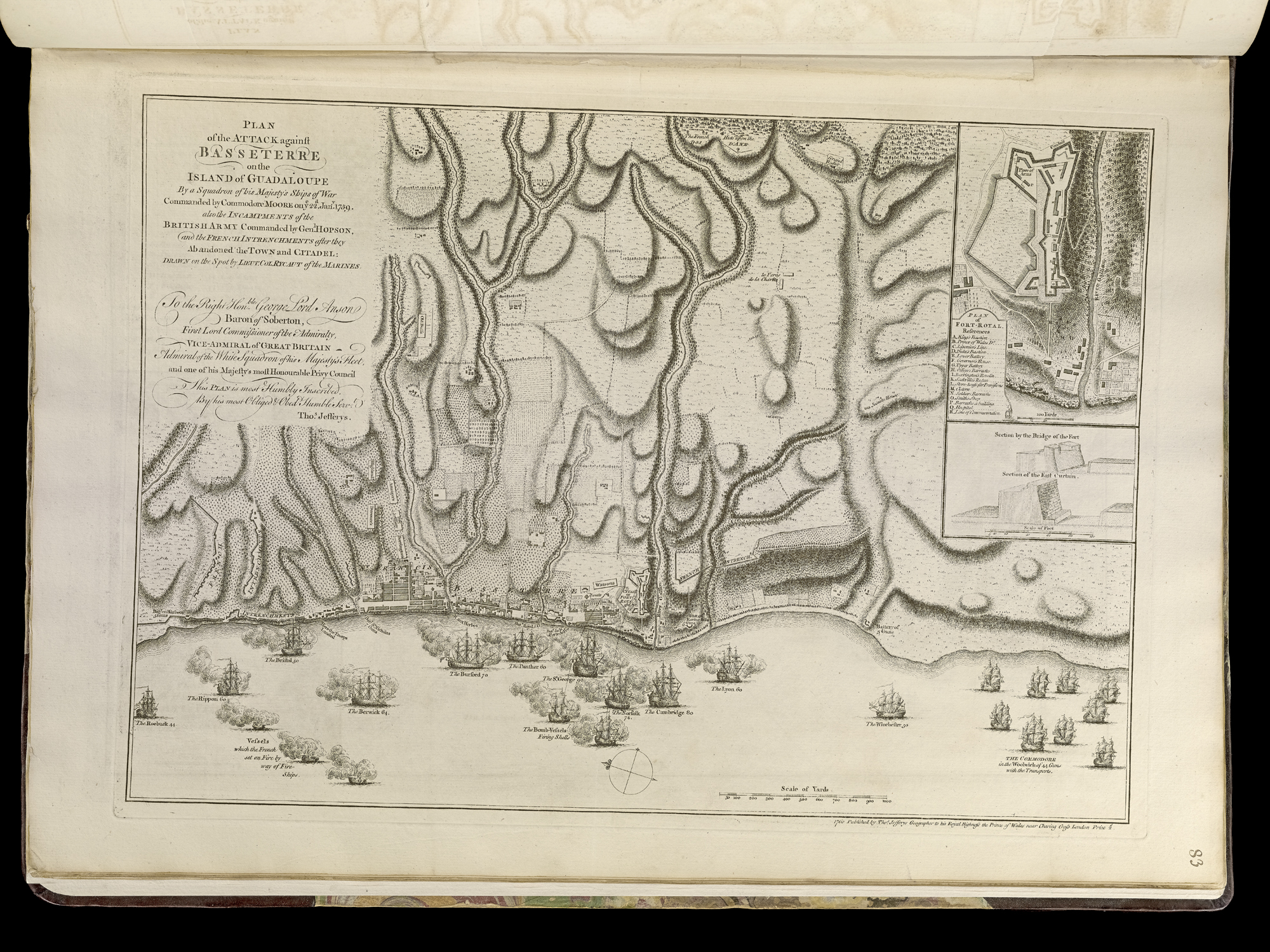
Plan of the attack against Basseterre, Guadeloupe by a squadron of Royal Navy ships of war commanded by Commodore Moore on 22 January 1759

After her return to England, Granado Commander John Botterell commissioned her in February 1760, for the Channel, though in April she underwent fitting at Portsmouth as a sloop. She was of Le Havre later that year. Between July and September 1761 she was at Portsmouth undergoing fitting as a bomb vessel. She sailed for the Leeward Islands on 30 October 1761.

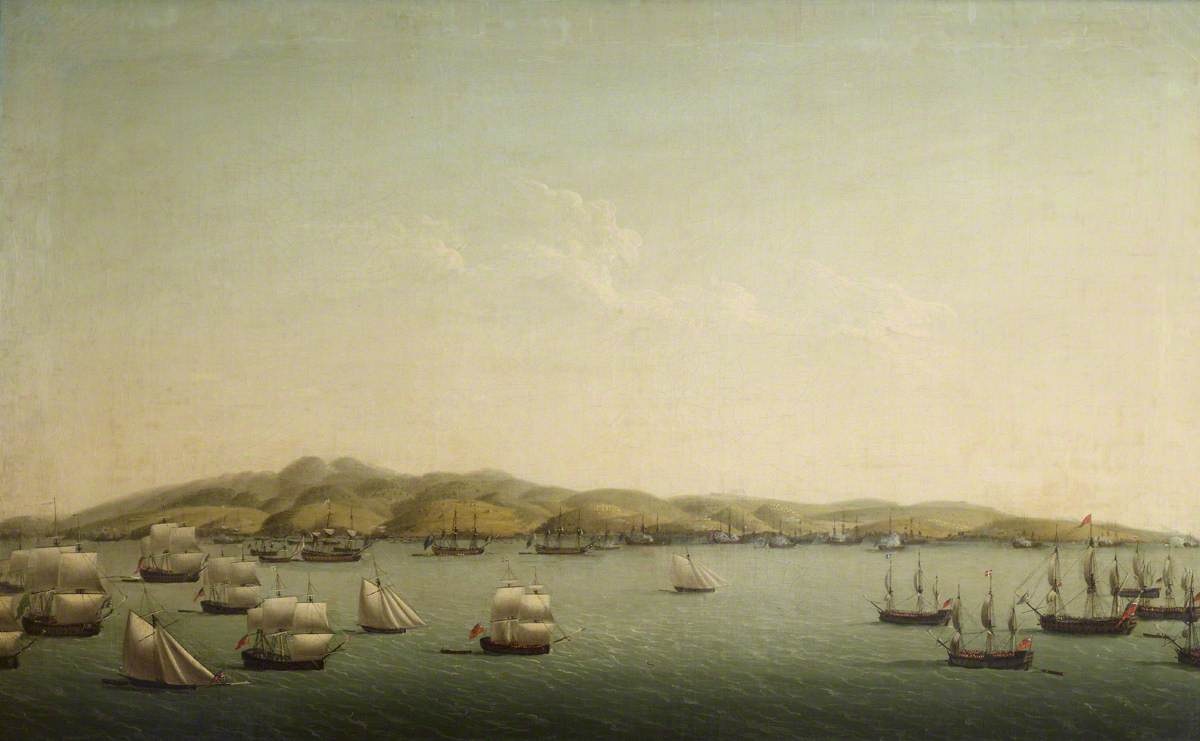
Rodney's Fleet Bombarding Martinique, 16 February 1762; Dominic Serres

Commander James Hawker recommissioned Granado as a bomb vessel in February 1762 being replaced in March by Commander Stair Douglas. Between 7 January 1762 and 10 February, she participated in the Invasion of Martinique (1762). In March she returned to Jamaica, from whence the invasion force had sailed. In July 1762 Granado was under the command of Commander Thomas Fraser. Next, between 6 June and 13 August 1762 she participated in the siege of Havana. The first of five payments of prize money for Havana occurred on 9 April 1764. The fifth and final payment occurred in 1772.

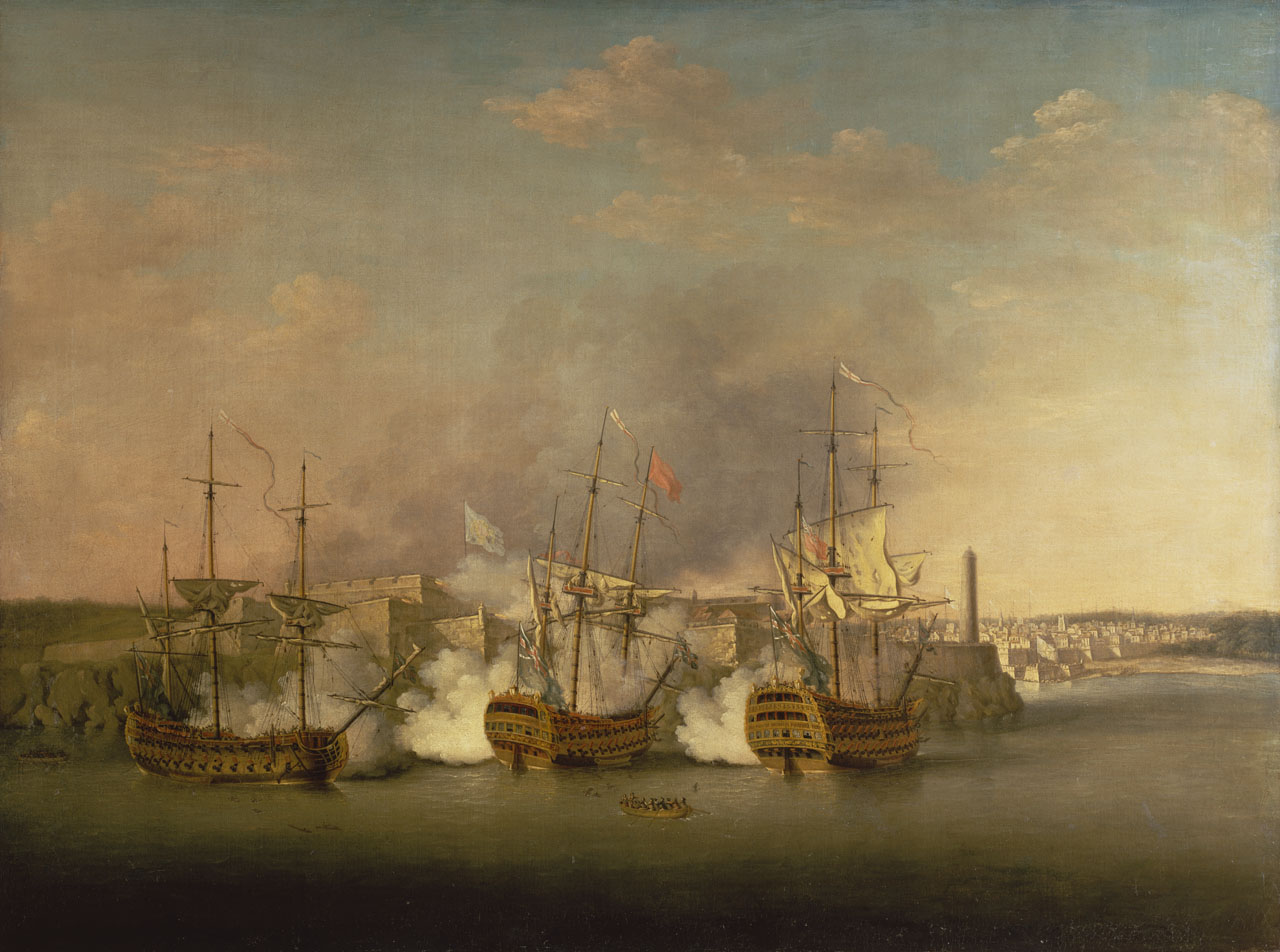
Bombardment of the Morro Castle, Havana, 1 July 1762 by Richard Paton

Disposal: Granado was paid off in June 1763. She was surveyed on 6 July. The "Principal Officers and Commissioners of His Majesty's Navy" first offered Granado for sale at Woolwich on 23 August. She sold on 30 August at Portsmouth for £575.

== Merchantman ==
Nesbit & Co. purchased Granada and renamed her Prince Frederick. Prince Frederick first appeared in Lloyd's Register (LR), in 1764.

Year	Master	Owner	Trade	Source & notes
1764	Jonathan Harman	Nesbit & Co.	Montreal & Jamaica	LR; repairs 1763

On 21 August 1766 Prince Frederick sailed as a store ship accompanying HMS Dolphin and HMS Swallow on the first leg of their exploration expedition to the Pacific. The expedition left Madeira on 21 October and reached Cape Virgenes on 16 December. There they recorded the height of the native Patagonians. Prince Frederick, which had been sailing in company with the expedition, left to go to Port Egmont, in the Falkland Islands, having provided further supplies for the other two ships. Prince Frederick, Hanan, master, arrived back at the Downs on 18 May 1767, from South America.

Year	Master	Owner	Trade	Source & notes
1768	Jonathan Hannan	Nesbit & Co.	London–Jamaica; Illegible	LR; almost rebuilt 1764

In 1768–1769 Prince Frederick, Hannan, master, traded with Mogador and Grenada. On 4 December 1789, she put into Plymouth. She was coming from Jamaica but with weak winds and being short of water and provisions, Hannan chose to break the journey to London. She arrived at Gravesend on 20 December. The last mention of Prince Frederick, Hannan, master, in Lloyd's List's ship arrival and departure data occurred in June 1772 when she returned to London from another voyage to Mogador and Grenada.

== Whaler ==
There are no online copies of Lloyd's Register for the volumes 1769 to 1775; Prince Frederick reappeared in the volume for 1776, having changed her name. New owners in 1775 apparently renamed Prince Frederick Prudence, and employed her as a whaler in the British northern whale fishery.

Year	Master	Owner	Trade	Source & notes
1776	John Hudson; William Simpson	Montgomery & Co.	London–Greenland	LR; thorough repairs 1770, 1774, & 1775

Year	Master	Where	Whales	Tuns whale oil	Seals
1775			1	15	20
1776	Simpson	Greenland	3	38.5	79

In 1777 Prudence, Simpson, master, sailed to New York rather than engaging in whaling. In 1778 she returned to whaling.

Year	Master	Where	Whales	Tuns whale oil	Seals
1778			7	62	74
1779	Simpson	Greenland	5.5	83	0
1780			3	48	0

== Transport ==
Prudence's owners withdrew her from whaling and chartered her to the British government as a transport.

Year	Master	Owner	Trade	Source & notes
1782	Simpson; Armstrong	Montgomery & Co.	London–Greenland; London transport	LR; thorough repairs 1770, 1774, & 1775

== Fate ==
Lloyd's List reported on 8 July 1783 that the transports Prudence and Union had been lost near Tellicherry. The entry for Prudence in the volume for LR for 1783 bears the annotation "Lost".

The wrecking occurred on 20 May 1782. Prudence and Union were serving as ordnance store ships when a storm drove them from Calicut roads. They were unable to clear Cotta Point and wrecked on the reefs there.
