= Munster Lass (1760 ship) =

British merchant ship and naval brig (1760–1781)

History

Great Britain
- Namesake: Munster
- Launched: 1760, or 1762, Thirteen Colonies
- Captured: 1780
- Fate: Last mentioned in 1781

General characteristics
- Tons burthen: 60 (bm)
- Sail plan: Brig

Munster Lass was launched in the Thirteen Colonies in 1760 or 1762. She was captured and recaptured in 1780. She served the Royal Navy in 1781, and then disappears from online records.

Munster Lass first appeared in online volumes of Lloyd's Register (LR) in 1768.

Year	Master	Owner	Trade	Source
1764	Jonathon Reed	Moore, Philadelphia	Dublin–Rotterdam	LR
1779	J.Reed	T.Derham	Cork–Bordeaux	LR

Munster Lass was no longer listed in Lloyd's Register in the volume for 1780. In the volumes extant between 1768 and 1779, she was the only vessel of that name listed.

Lloyd's List reported in November 1780 that while Munster Lass was sailing from Pensacola to Jamaica she had been taken, retaken, and brought into Jamaica.

Munster Lass apparently became a ship's tender for the Royal Navy.

Following the French invasion of Tobago on 24 May 1781, Admiral George Rodney sent Fly, Shelanagig, and Munster Lass to reconnoitre Tobago to gather what information they could, especially about possible landing sites for British troops. The three took different routes.

On 28 May near St Lucia Shelanagig encountered the French fleet under Comte de Grasse, which captured her. By 2 June, the French had successfully gained control of Tobago. Munster Lass had put Lieutenant Johnston of the Royal Marines on shore at Tyrrel's Bay (11.298°N 60.534°W) in Tobago and it was he that reported back to Rodney on 4 June that the French had captured Tobago.

Also on 4 June The French captured Fly off Tobago.

The Royal Navy's West India squadron recaptured Schelanagig in 1782, but there is no report of her subsequent disposition. It is not clear what happened to Fly, or Munster Lass.

When Rodney learned of Ferguson's surrender, he immediately sailed out from Barbados. When he finally spotted de Grasse's fleet, the latter was sailing for Grenada with 24 ships of the line to Rodney's 20. Rodney decided to avoid action, claiming later that he was concerned that chasing de Grasse would have left him to leeward, with de Grasse then free to attack Barbados. The French held Tobago until 1814.
