= French ship Hector =

Ship of the French Navy, launched 1755

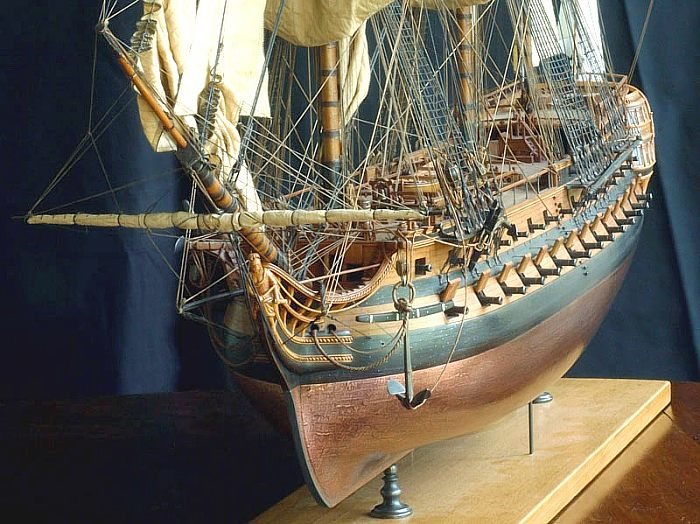
- A 74-gun French ship of the line similar to Hector

History

France
- Name: Hector
- Ordered: 2 July 1751
- Builder: Toulon >
- Laid down: 23 July 1752
- Launched: 23 July 1755
- In service: June 1756
- Stricken: 3 October 1782
- Captured: April 1782

Great Britain
- Name: Hector
- Acquired: April 1782 by capture
- Fate: Damaged in battle September 1782. Sunk October 1782.

General characteristics
- Class & type: Hector-class of the line
- Displacement: 2800 tonneaux
- Tons burthen: 1450 port tonneaux
- Length: 53.3 m (175 ft)
- Beam: 14 m (46 ft)
- Draught: 7.1 m (23 ft)
- Propulsion: Sail
- Armament: 74 guns
- Armour: Timber

Hector was a 74-gun of the line of the French Navy, lead ship of her class. Hector was launched in 1755 and fought in the American Revolutionary War during which she captured two ships of the British Royal Navy on 14 August 1778. In 1782, the ship was captured by the Royal Navy at the Battle of the Saintes in 1782. Taken into service by the Royal Navy, the vessel was renamed HMS Hector. On 5 September 1782. HMS Hector fought two French frigates. Severely damaged during the battle, and by a hurricane that followed later in September, Hector sank on 4 October 1782.

== Career ==
=== French service ===
Hector was launched on 23 July 1755, and commissioned under Captain Vilarzel d'Hélie.

In 1757, the vessel departed Toulon on 18 March, arriving in Louisbourg on 15 June. Returning to Brest on 23 November with 5,000 sick aboard, she spread typhus to the town; the ensuing epidemic caused 10,000 fatalities. She was then decommissioned and stayed in the reserve in Brest.

In July 1762, while cruising off Cap Français, she struck the bottom on a rock. The same spot had been the site of the wreck of Dragon on 17 March of the same year.

Between 1763 and 1777, she was decommissioned in Toulon. During the American Revolutionary War, she reactivated, sailing to Delaware in July 1778. She arrived at Newport on 8 August 1778. On 14 August 1778, Hector and the 64-gun Vaillant captured the 8-gun bomb vessel HMS Thunder. The same day, she also captured the 16-gun HMS Senegal at Sandy Hook.

In 1778, she was part of the fleet under Admiral d'Estaing, under Captain Moriès-Castellet, and Clavières as first officer.

Hector then took part in the Battle of Grenada on 6 July 1779 and in the Siege of Savannah, before returning to Brest, arriving on 10 December 1779. She was laid up in ordinary at Lorient on 21 December 1779, before rearming. On 1 September 1780, she departed Brest under Louis Augustin de Monteclerc for a cruise, returning on 31 December. The year after, she took part in the Battle of the Chesapeake on 5 September 1781, under Renaud d'Aleins.

During the Battle of the Saintes, from 9 to 12 April 1782, she battled HMS Canada and Alcide and was captured. Her captain, Lavicomté, died in the action.

=== British service ===
The British took her to Jamaica, where she was repaired and recommissioned in the Royal Navy as HMS Hector. She took part in the action of 5 September 1782, where she was damaged by the frigates Aigle and Gloire. Much damaged in this action and after suffering the 1782 Central Atlantic hurricane of 17 September, she sank on 4 October 1782. The privateer Hawke saved 200 of her crew.
