= French ship Glorieux (1756) =

Ship of the line of the French Navy

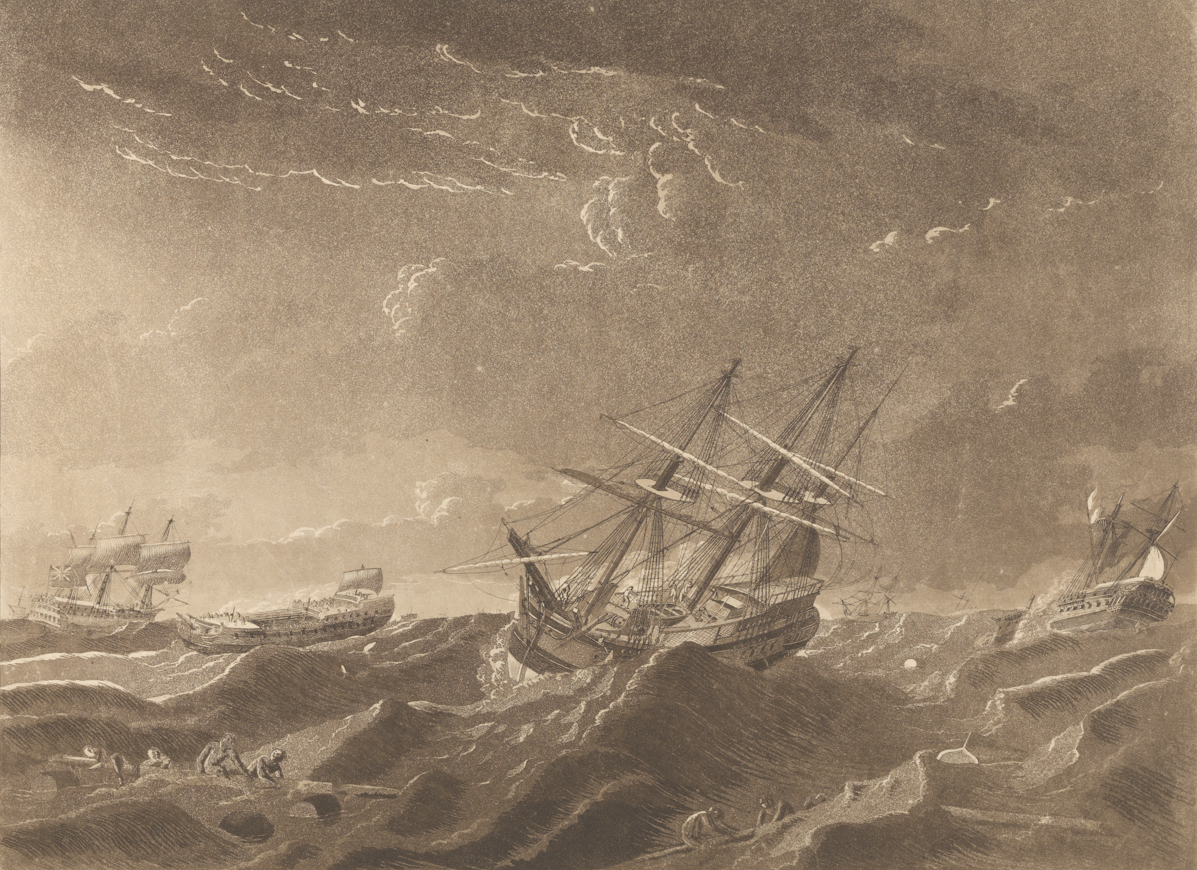
- The view from Lady Juliana on the morning after the hurricane, featuring Glorieux along with HMS Centaur and Ville de Paris

History

France
- Name: Glorieux
- Launched: 10 August 1756
- Captured: At the Battle of the Saintes on 12 April 1782

Great Britain
- Name: HMS Glorieux
- Acquired: 12 April 1782
- Commissioned: 13 April 1782
- Fate: Foundered in a hurricane on 18 September 1782

General characteristics
- Class & type: 74-gun third-rate ship of the line
- Displacement: 2765 tonneaux
- Tons burthen: 1500 port tonneaux
- Length: 175 ft (53 m)
- Beam: 47 ft 4 in (14.43 m)
- Depth of hold: 21 ft 3 in (6.48 m)
- Propulsion: Sails
- Sail plan: Full-rigged ship
- Complement: 600
- Armament: Gundeck: 28 × 32-pounder guns; Upper gundeck: 28 × 18-pounder guns; QD: 14 × 9-pounder guns; Fc: 4 × 9-pounder guns

Glorieux was a 74-gun ship of the line in the French Navy. Built by Clairin Deslauriers at Rochefort and launched on 10 August 1756, she was rebuilt in 1777.

== French service ==
On 4 June 1781 Glorieux captured the cutter HMS Fly.

On 30 August 1781, she was with the French fleet under Admiral de Grasse. According to French sources, the British sloop Loyalist and the frigate Guadeloupe were on picket duty in the Chesapeake when they encountered the French fleet. Guadeloupe escaped up the York River to York Town, where she would later be scuttled. The English court martial records report that Loyalist was returning to the British fleet off the Jersey coast when she encountered the main French fleet. The French frigate Aigrette, with the 74-gun Glorieux in sight, was able to overtake Loyalist. The French took her into service as Loyaliste in September, but then gave her to the Americans in November 1781.

On 12 April 1782 the ship, under command of Captain (Baron) D'Escars, faced first HMS Duke then HMS Formidable at the Battle of the Saintes. In her approach she nailed her white colours to the mast and a sergeant of the Auxerrois regiment tied his halberd and bravely stood at the head of the ship waving it. When shot in his right arm, he deftly caught the halberd in his left hand and continued to wave. He was later made an officer for his bravery. Following the battle, despite the attempts of Denis Decrès aboard Richemont (previously a British ship) to give tow to the stricken vessel, she was captured.

Towed instead to a British-controlled port, she was recommissioned her into the Royal Navy as HMS Glorieux or HMS Glorious the following day. She was rated as a third rate.

== Fate ==
She sailed with the fleet for England on 25 July 1782 but was lost later that year in the 1782 Central Atlantic hurricane off the Grand Banks of Newfoundland on 16–17 September, along with the French prize Ville de Paris. Glorieux was lost with all hands, including her captain, Thomas Cadogan, son of Charles Cadogan, 3rd Baron Cadogan. This disaster to the fleet of Admiral Graves also saw the loss of HMS Ramillies, HMS Centaur, the storeships Dutton and British Queen, and other merchantmen from a convoy of 94 ships, with a total of over 3,500 men lost.

== Other ==
Heller SA has created a 1:150 scale model of Le Glorieux in its French guise.

== See also ==
- HMS Glorioso
- HMS Glorious
- HMS Glory
