= HMS Fly (1778) =

British naval cutter (1778–1781)

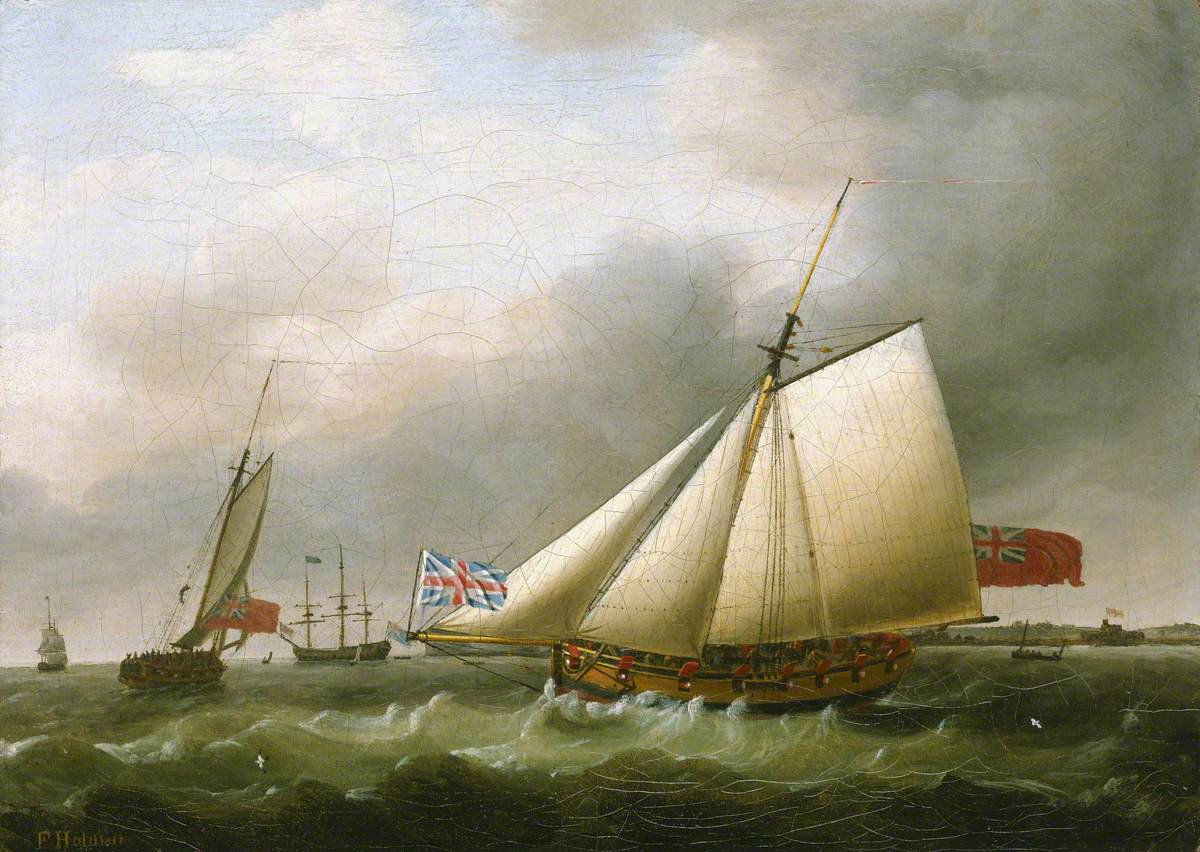
- Fly and Other Vessels by Francis Holman

History

Great Britain
- Name: HMS Fly
- Acquired: 1778, by purchase
- Captured: 4 June 1781

General characteristics
- Complement: 50
- Armament: 8 carriage guns + swivel guns

HMS Fly was a cutter that the Royal Navy purchased in 1778. The French Navy captured Fly in June 1781.

== Career ==
Lieutenant Milham Ponsonby commissioned Fly in May 1780. On 29 November he sailed her to the West Indies to join Rear-Admiral Sir Samuel Hood's squadron. Ponsonby was promoted to commander on 15 January 1781 but stayed with Fly. Fly was assigned to the protection of the island of Tobago, arriving there with a convoy on 21 January. While there Fly's surgeon attempted to start a mutiny on the ship, trying to persuade the crew that they were not subject to naval discipline; Ponsonby had him removed from Fly.

While on station Fly, described in the London Gazette as a sloop, captured the Dutch brigantine Hope as Hope attempted to sail from Demerara to Amsterdam. Hope's cargo was condemned at the Tobago vice admiralty court, and Fly's crew received prize money from the capture in December 1784.

Following the French invasion of Tobago on 24 May, Admiral George Rodney sent Fly, HMS Shelanagig, and Munster Lass to reconnoitre Tobago to gather what information they could, especially about possible landing sites for British troops. The three took different routes.

On 28 May near St Lucia Shelanagig encountered the French fleet under Comte de Grasse, which captured her. By 2 June, the French had successfully gained control of Tobago.

== Fate ==
On 4 June Fly was off Tobago when at 4pm she sighted a large vessel heading for her. Fly attempted to escape. After an all-night chase that extended over 60 miles, the French vessel was able to come to within cannon-shot of Fly. The French ship was the 74-gun third-rate ship of the line Glorieux. Glorieux fired several shots over Fly; Fly fired a pro-forma broadside and then Ponsonby struck.

== Aftermath ==
Only Munster Lass managed to rejoin the British fleet, and it was she that brought the news of Tobago's surrender. The Royal Navy's West India squadron recaptured Schelanagig, in 1782, but there is no report of her subsequent disposition. It is not clear what happened to Fly.

Rodney learned of Ferguson's surrender on June 4, and immediately sailed out from Barbados. When he finally spotted de Grasse's fleet, the latter was sailing for Grenada with 24 ships of the line to Rodney's 20; Rodney decided to avoid action, claiming later that he was concerned that chasing de Grasse would have left him to leeward, with de Grasse then free to attack Barbados. The French held Tobago until 1814.
