= Claude Eugène Chauchouart de Lavicomté =

French Navy officer of the War of American Independence

Claude Eugène Chauchouart de Lavicomté (Note: Also written "La Vicomté".) ( — Hector, Battle of the Saintes, 12 April 1782) was a French Navy officer. He served in the American Revolutionary War.

== Biography ==
Lavicomté was born at Saint-Malo. He joined the Navy as a Garde-Marine on 11 June 1748. He was promoted to Lieutenant on 15 January 1762, and to Captain on 10 May 1777.

He was killed at the Battle of the Saintes on 12 April 1782.

== Sources and references ==
Notes

Citations

References

- Lacour-Gayet, Georges (1910). La marine militaire de la France sous le règne de Louis XVI. Paris: Honoré Champion. pp. 431–434.
- Marley, David (1998). Wars of the Americas: A Chronology of Armed Conflict in the New World, 1492 to the Present. ABC-CLIO. p. 343. ISBN 0874368375.
