= HMS Shelanagig =

British Royal Navy sloop (1780–1781)

History

Great Britain
- Name: HMS Shelanagig
- Namesake: Sheela na gig
- Acquired: 1780 by purchase
- Captured: 1781
- Fate: Recaptured 1782; subsequent fate unknown

General characteristics
- Type: Sloop
- Propulsion: Sails
- Complement: 40
- Armament: 16 guns (Note: French records after her capture refer to her as a schooner of 20 guns.)

HMS Shelanagig (or Sheelanagig, or other variants), was a sloop of 16-guns purchased in the West Indies in 1780 for the Royal Navy. (Note: The National Maritime Museum, Greenwich, in its database of Royal Navy vessels mistakenly lists her name as Shelanagio.) She was under the command of James Shepherd, (or Keith Shepherd, or Commander J.K. Sheppard), and her Second Lieutenant was Home Popham.

When Admiral Rodney heard that the French were besieging Tobago, he sent Shelanagig, the cutter Fly, and Munster Lass to reconnoitre Tobago to gather what information they could, especially about possible landing sites for British troops. The three took different routes. (Note: In describing his instructions, although Rodney gave the names of the captains of the captains of Fly and Shelanagig, and the names of Fly and Munster Lass, he neglected to name Shelanagig.) Still, on 28 May 1781 near St Lucia Shelanagig encountered the French fleet under Comte de Grasse, which captured her. Also, on 4 June the French captured Fly. Only Munster Lass managed to rejoin the British fleet.

French records indicate that Shelanagig's ultimate fate is unknown. British records do report that the West India squadron recaptured the sloop Schelanagig, of 16 guns, in 1782, but do not report a subsequent disposition.

Shelanagig's officers were paroled after the capture of their vessel, with Popham returning to Demerara and Shepherd and ship's master Edward Park(e) travelling direct to England. Shepherd and Park were court martialed on 23 January 1782. Their evidence was that Shelanigig had been outnumbered six to one; that the French vessels had sailed faster than their own, and that heavy winds had so heeled the British ship towards the French that she had been unable to aim or fire her guns. Shepherd and Park were acquitted of any misconduct. Popham was not called, as he had not yet returned to England, and his fellow officer's acquittal indicated there was no case to answer. All three returned to active service, with Popham being promoted to First Lieutenant aboard HMS Alarm.
