= Thomas Graves, 1st Baron Graves =

Royal Navy officer, politician and colonial administrator (1725–1802)

Admiral The Right Honourable The Lord Graves KB
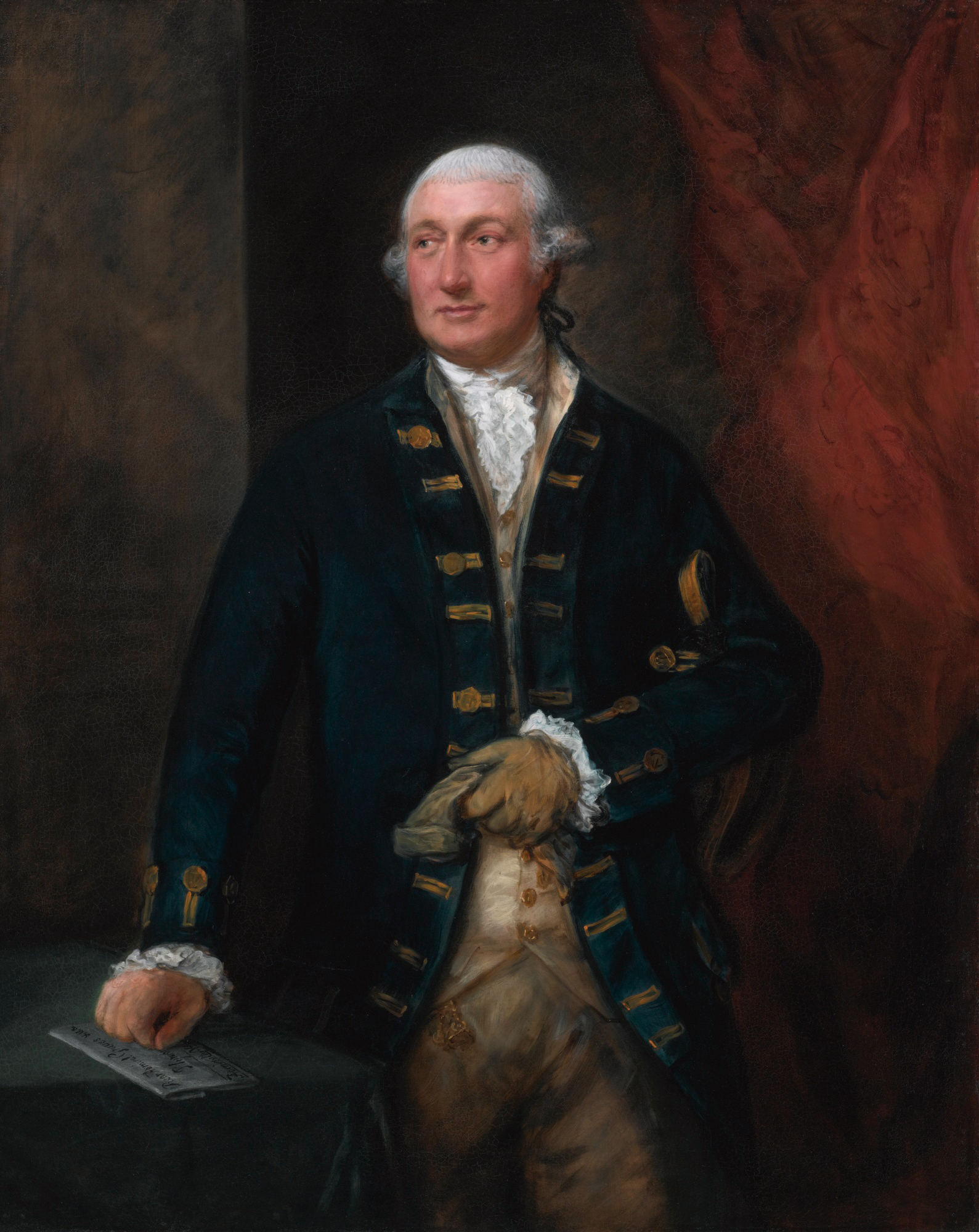
- Portrait by Thomas Gainsborough, 1786
- Born: 23 October 1725; Plymouth, Devon
- Died: 9 February 1802 (aged 76); Devon, England
- Spouse: Elizabeth Williams (m. 1771)
- Children: Thomas
- Relatives: Alfred van der Smissen, 2nd Baron van der Smissen, his great-nephew.
- Military career
- Allegiance: Great Britain
- Branch: Royal Navy
- Service years: 1740–1802
- Rank: Admiral of the White
- Commands: North American Station; Plymouth Command
- Conflicts: Seven Years' War; American War of Independence; French Revolutionary Wars

Viceregal styles of The Lord Graves
- Reference style: His Excellency
- Spoken style: Your Excellency

Admiral of the White Thomas Graves, 1st Baron Graves, KB (23 October 1725 – 9 February 1802) was a Royal Navy officer, politician and colonial administrator who served in the Seven Years' War and American War of Independence. He also served as the Commodore-Governor of Newfoundland from 1761 to 1764.

== Military career ==
Born in England in October 1725, Graves was the second son of Rear-Admiral Thomas Graves of Thanckes in Cornwall. Graves' first military experience was as a volunteer with Commodore Henry Medley's crew around 1740. He was promoted to lieutenant in 1743, and captain in 1755. In the first year of the Seven Years' War, Graves failed to confront a French ship which gave challenge. He was tried by court-martial for not engaging his ship, and reprimanded. Graves became Commodore-Governor of Newfoundland in 1761 and given the duty of convoying the seasonal fishing fleet from England to the island. In 1762 he learned that French ships had captured St. John's. Graves, Admiral Alexander Colville and Colonel William Amherst retook the port city.

With the end of the Seven Years' War, Labrador came under his responsibility as French fishing fleets returned to the French Shore and St. Pierre and Miquelon. Graves strictly enforced the treaties to the extent that the French government protested. Graves' governorship ended in 1764. He returned to active service during the American War of Independence, being promoted to Rear-Admiral of the Blue on 19 March 1779, Rear-Admiral of the White on 19 March 1780 and Rear-Admiral of the Red on 26 September. Graves became commander-in-chief of the North American Squadron in 1781 when Mariot Arbuthnot returned home.

On 5 September 1781, a fleet under Graves was defeated by a French fleet led by the Comte de Grasse in the Battle of the Chesapeake at the mouth of Chesapeake Bay, leading to the surrender of a besieged British army under Lord Cornwallis at Yorktown not long afterwards. In September 1782, a fleet under his command was caught in a violent storm off the banks of Newfoundland. The captured French ships from the Battle of the Saintes Ville de Paris (110 guns) and HMS Glorieux (74 guns), and the British ships HMS Ramillies (74 guns) and Centaur (74 guns) foundered, along with other merchant ships, with the loss of 3,500 lives. In 1786 Graves became Commander-in-Chief, Plymouth. He was promoted to Vice-Admiral of the Blue on 24 September 1787 and Vice-Admiral of the Red on 1 February 1793.

During the French Revolutionary Wars, Graves was promoted to Admiral of the Blue on 12 April 1794 and served as the second-in-command to Admiral of the Blue Richard Howe, Earl Howe at the Glorious First of June on 1 June, suffering a severe injury to his right arm. Following the battle, Graves was elevated to the Irish peerage as Baron Graves of Gravesend on 24 October. However, his wound led to the end of Graves' active career and he retired to estate in Devon. Graves was promoted to Admiral of the White on 1 June 1795.

== Personal life ==
Lord Graves married Elizabeth, daughter of William Peere Williams, in 1771. The couple had a son, Thomas, in 1775. Following several battle injuries, Graves retired to his Devon estate in 1794, and died in February 1802, aged 76.

== Arms ==
Coat of arms of Thomas Graves, 1st Baron Graves
Crest A demi-eagle displayed and erased Or encircled round the body and below the wings by a ducal coronet Argent. Escutcheon Gules an eagle displayed Or ducally crowned Argent. On a canton of the last an anchor Proper. Supporters Two royal vultures wings close Proper. Motto Aquila Non Captat Muscas

== See also ==
- Governors of Newfoundland
- List of people of Newfoundland and Labrador

== Notes ==
Parliament of Great Britain
Preceded by John Buller; Sir Charles Whitworth	Member of Parliament for East Looe; 1775; With: John Buller	Succeeded by John Buller; William Graves
Political offices
Preceded by James Webb	Governor of Newfoundland; 1761–1764	Succeeded by Sir Hugh Palliser
Military offices
Preceded by Mariot Arbuthnot	Commander-in-Chief, North American Station; 1781	Succeeded by Robert Digby
Preceded by Mark Milbanke	Commander-in-Chief, Plymouth; 1786–1790	Succeeded by Sir Richard Bickerton
Peerage of Ireland
New creation	Baron Graves; 1794–1802	Succeeded by Thomas North Graves
