= HMS Centaur (1759) =

Ship of the line of the Royal Navy

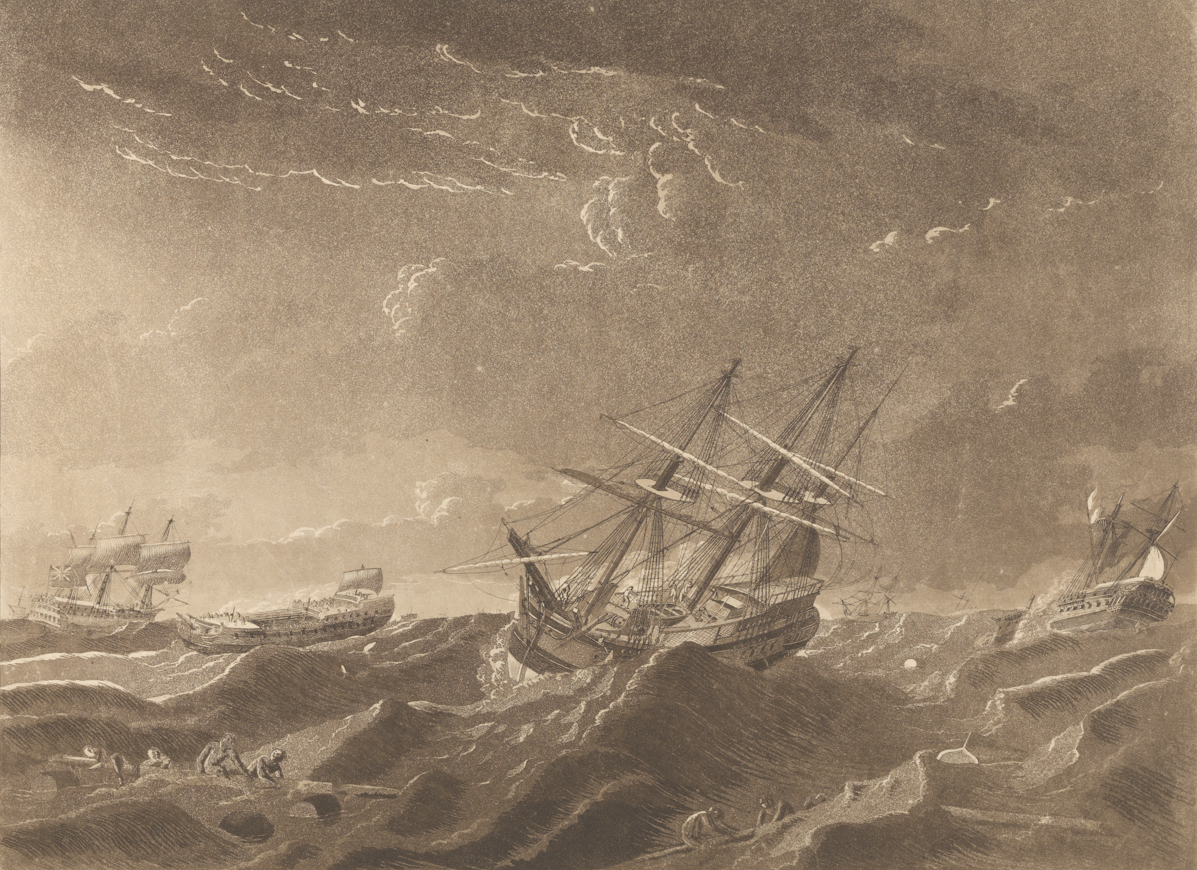
- The view from Lady Juliana on the morning after the hurricane, featuring Centaur along with HMS Glorieux and HMS Ville de Paris

History

France
- Name: Centaure
- Ordered: 1755
- Builder: Joseph-Marie-Blaise Coulomb, Toulon Dockyard
- Laid down: February 1756
- Launched: 17 March 1757
- Commissioned: October 1757
- Captured: 18 August 1759, by Royal Navy

General characteristics In French service
- Class & type: 74-gun second-rank ship of the line
- Tons burthen: 1450
- Length: 164 French feet
- Beam: 43 French feet
- Draught: 19 French feet 11 inches
- Depth of hold: 20½ French feet
- Propulsion: Sails
- Sail plan: Full-rigged ship
- Complement: 620 men, +6/10 officers
- Armament: 74 guns of various weights of shot

Great Britain
- Name: HMS Centaur
- Acquired: 18 August 1759
- Fate: Wrecked, 24 September 1782

General characteristics In British service
- Class & type: 74-gun third-rate ship of the line
- Tons burthen: 1739
- Length: 175 ft 8 in (53.54 m) (gundeck)
- Beam: 47 ft 5 in (14.45 m)
- Depth of hold: 20 ft (6.1 m)
- Propulsion: Sails
- Sail plan: Full-rigged ship
- Armament: 74 guns of various weights of shot

Centaure was a 74-gun ship of the line of the French Navy, launched at Toulon in 1757. She was designed by Joseph-Marie-Blaise Coulomb and named on 25 October 1755, and built under his supervision at Toulon. In French service she carried 74 cannon, comprising: 28 × 36-pounders on the lower deck, 30 × 18-pounders on the upper deck, 10 × 8-pounders on the quarterdeck, 6 × 8-pounders on the forecastle.

The Royal Navy captured Centaure at the Battle of Lagos on 18 August 1759, and commissioned her as the third-rate HMS Centaur.

== Career in British service ==
She had a skirmish with the French ships Vaillant and Amethyste, in January 1760. In the War of American Independence, Centaur served continuously on the North America/West Indies station, taking part in all the major battles including Admiral Rodney's victory at the Saintes.

== Loss ==
In September 1782, Centaur was one of the ships escorting prizes and a large trade convoy back to Britain from Jamaica, when she foundered due to damage received in the 1782 Central Atlantic hurricane near the Grand Banks of Newfoundland. Captain John Nicholson Inglefield, along with eleven of his crew, survived the wreck in one of the ship's pinnaces, arriving at the Azores after sailing in an open boat for 16 days without compass quadrant or sail, and only two quart bottles of water; some 400 of her crew perished.

== See also ==
- List of ships captured in the 18th century
