= 1782 Central Atlantic hurricane =

Atlantic hurricane in 1782

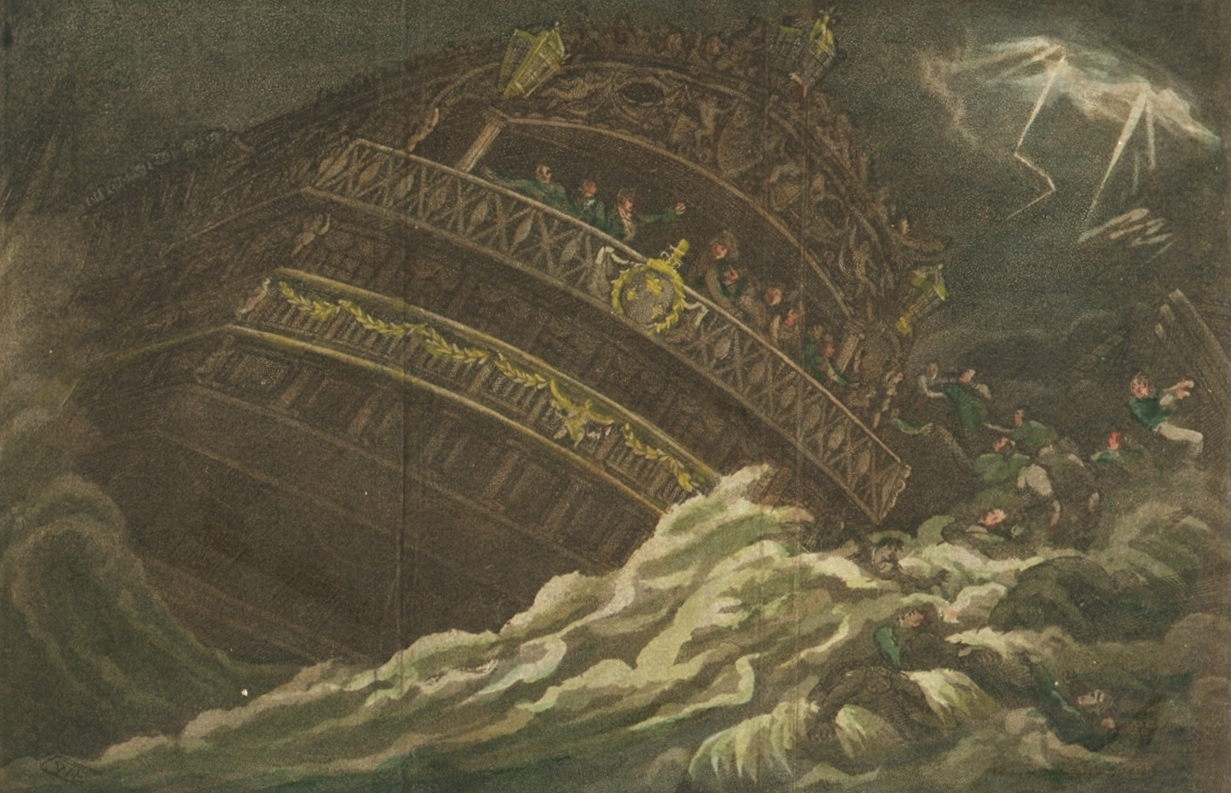
Ville de Paris sinking during the hurricane

The 1782 Central Atlantic hurricane was a hurricane which struck a British fleet under Admiral Thomas Graves off the Grand Banks of Newfoundland in September 1782. It is believed to have killed some 3,500 people.

== Impact ==
A British fleet under Admiral Thomas Graves was en route from Jamaica to England by way of Newfoundland. On 17 September 1782, Grave's fleet was caught in a violent storm off the Grand Banks of Newfoundland. The French prize Ville de Paris foundered, as did HMS Glorieux, HMS Hector and HMS Centaur. HMS Ramillies was abandoned and scuttled. HMS Ardent and HMS Caton were forced to leave the fleet and make for a safe anchorage, Ardent returning to Jamaica and Caton making for Halifax, Nova Scotia in company with HMS Pallas. Of the warships in the fleet, only HMS Canada and HMS Jason managed to reach England. A number of merchant ships in the fleet, including Dutton, British Queen, Withywood, Rodney, Ann, Minerva and Mentor also foundered. Altogether around 3,500 British sailors died from the various ships foundering.

== See also ==
- List of deadliest Atlantic hurricanes

== Sources ==
- The Percy Anecdotes: Shipwreck, by Reuben Percy and Sholto Percy
- Papers Past DESTRUCTION OF ADMIRAL GRAVES' FLEET.
- Darkest Hours, by Jay Robert Nash
- The history of England: from the accession of George III, 1760-1835, Volume 3, by Thomas Smart Hughes, Tobias George Smollett
