= French ship Ville de Paris (1764) =

Ship of the line of the French Navy

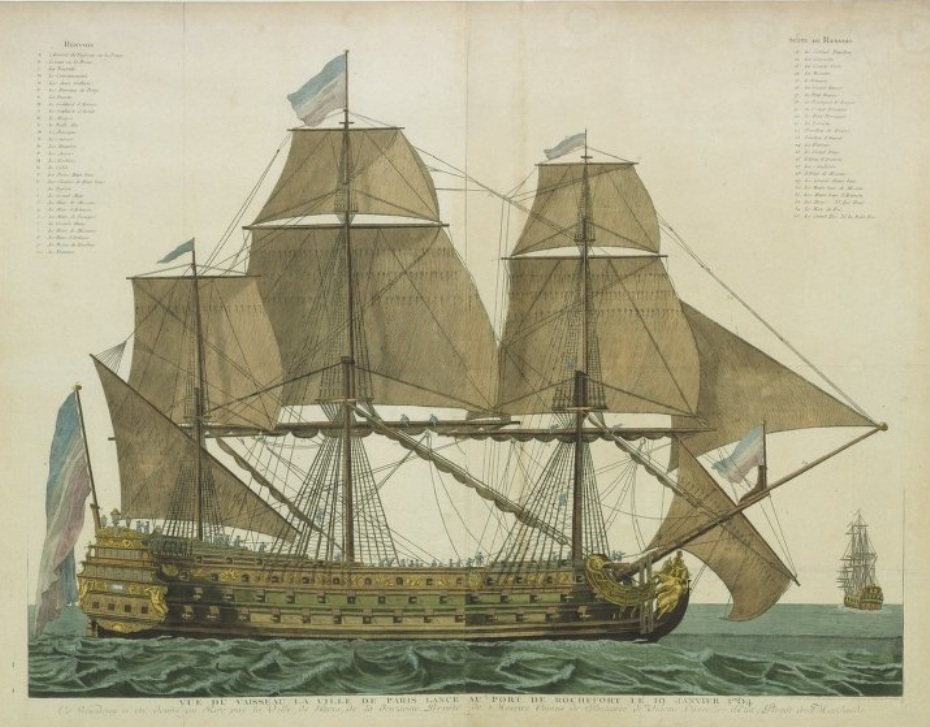
- Ville de Paris in Rochefort, 1764

History

France
- Name: Impétueux
- Ordered: as Impétueux
- Builder: Rochefort harbour
- Laid down: 1757
- Launched: 19 January 1764
- Commissioned: 1764
- Renamed: Ville de Paris in 1762
- Fate: Sank during 1782 Central Atlantic hurricane in September 1782

General characteristics
- Class & type: Ship of the line
- Displacement: 4222 tonneaux
- Tons burthen: 2000 port tonneaux
- Length: 54 m (177 ft)
- Beam: 14.6 m (48 ft)
- Draught: 6.7 m (22 ft)
- Propulsion: Sail
- Armament: 90 guns: 30 × 36-pounder long guns; 32 × 24-pounder long guns; 28 ×12-pounder long guns; 104 guns; 14 × 8-pounder long guns were added in 1779
- Armour: Timber

Ville de Paris was a ship of the line of the French Navy. Launched in 1764 mounting 90 guns, she underwent a refit in 1779 which added 14 more guns. One of the don des vaisseaux, Ville de Paris served in the American Revolutionary War as the flagship of Admiral François Joseph Paul de Grasse. Her final battle was the Battle of the Saintes in 1782, where she was captured by the Royal Navy. While the British were transporting her to England, she sank in the 1782 Central Atlantic hurricane.

== Career ==
Originally laid down in 1757 as the 90-gun Impétueux, she was renamed Ville de Paris in 1762 in recognition of her construction being paid for by the city of Paris as part of the don des vaisseaux, Duc de Choiseul’s campaign to solicit donations for the navy from the cities and provinces of France. She was completed in 1764, just too late to serve in the Seven Years' War and was placed into reserve. Ville de Paris was one of the first three-deckers to be completed for the French navy since the 1720s.

In 1778, on the French entry into the American Revolutionary War, she was formally commissioned at Brest and assigned as the flagship of Admiral Guichen. In July, she saw one of her first actions fighting in the indecisive Battle of Ushant.

At some point during the next two years, she underwent renovations to have her previously unmanned quarterdeck fitted with fourteen small guns that could be manned by individual sailors, thus making her a 104-gun ship.

In 1779, she joined the fleet of Commander Duchaffault as part of the Armada of 1779.

In March 1781, she sailed for the West Indies, this time as part of a fleet of twenty ships of the line under De Grasse. She then fought at the Battle of Fort Royal and the Battle of the Chesapeake, under Captain Antoine Cresp.

In 1782, she saw action at the Battle of St. Kitts, this time as De Grasse's flagship.

Representations of Ville de Paris
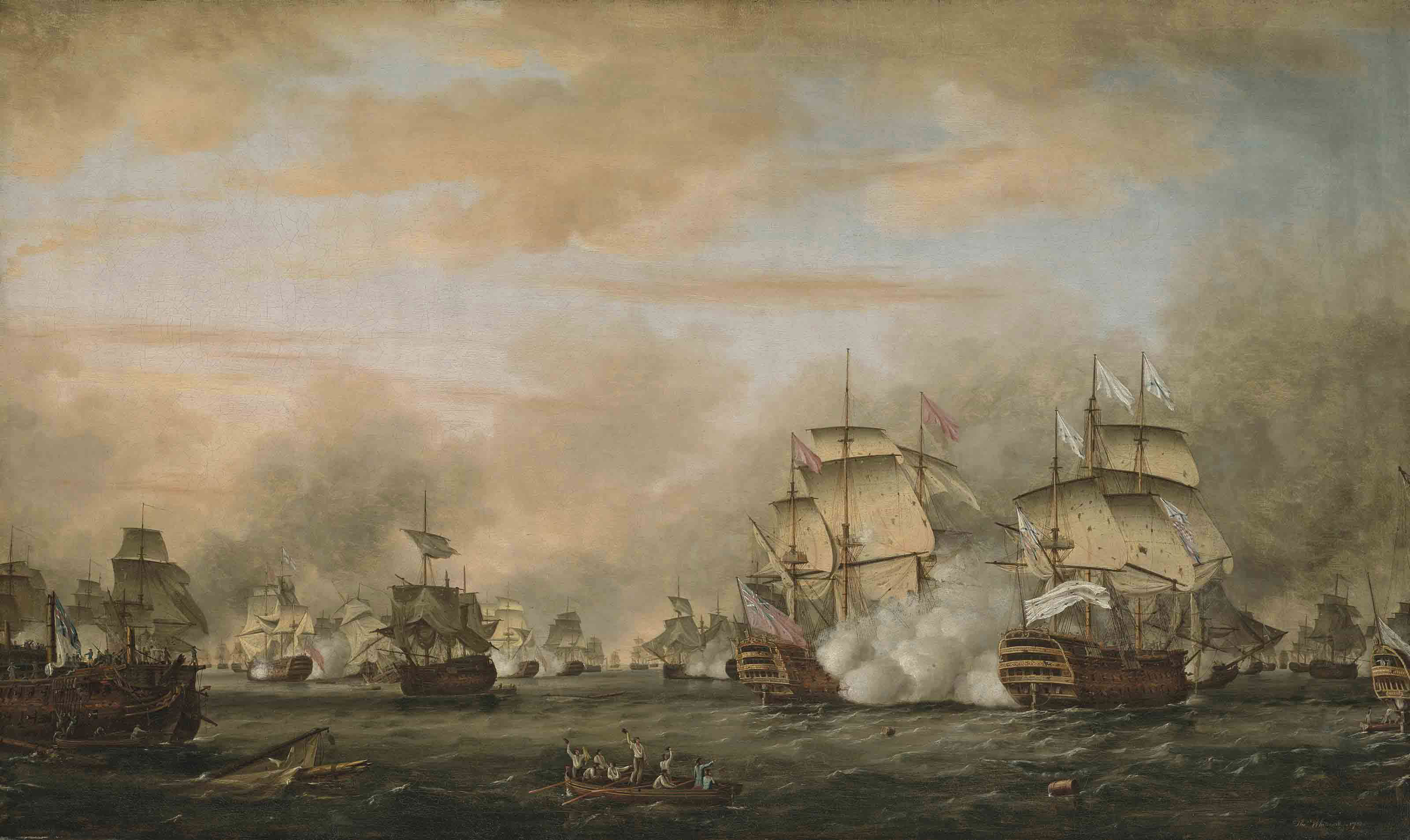
The Battle of the Saintes, 12 April 1782: surrender of the Ville de Paris by Thomas Whitcombe, painted 1783, shows Hood's Barfleur, centre, attacking the French flagship Ville de Paris, right.

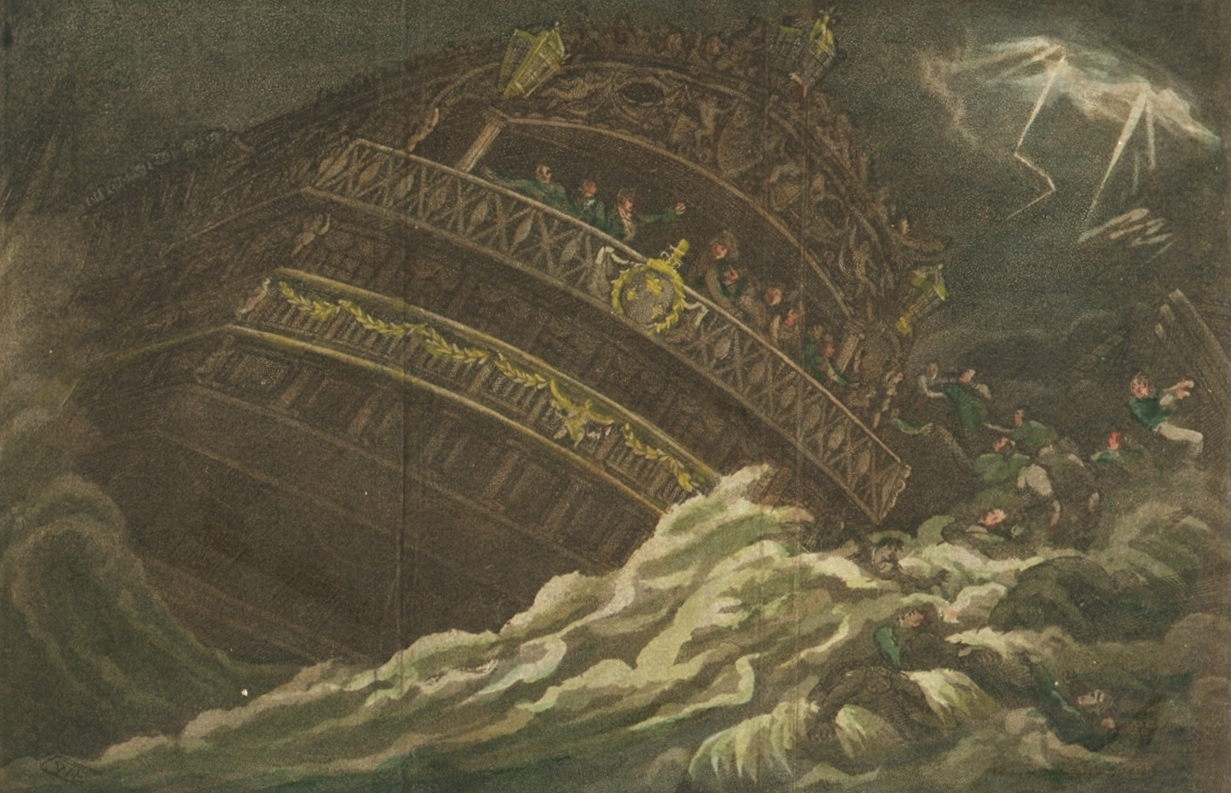
The Ville de Paris, foundering in the middle of the Atlantic Ocean

At the Battle of the Saintes on 12 April 1782, the British fleet under Admiral Sir George Rodney defeated the French ships of De Grasse and captured the badly damaged Ville de Paris. No longer capable of sailing with her masts and rudder shot away, the stricken ship was towed by HMS Namur after the battle enroute to Port Royal, Jamaica, where she was repaired and prepped for sail back to England to be put into British service.

The ship sank in September 1782 with other vessels, including HMS Glorieux, when the 1782 Central Atlantic hurricane hit the fleet off Newfoundland under the command of De Grasse's enemy, Admiral Graves. Ville de Paris sank with the loss of all 500 hands but one, thereafter known as "Wilson of the Ville de Paris".

A ship of the line of the Royal Navy was later given her name: HMS Ville de Paris, launched in 1795.

== Legacy ==
Two of her guns were left in Jamaica during repairs; they now flank the Rodney memorial in Spanish Town, Jamaica.
