= HMS Ville de Paris =

Royal Navy ship of the line of the Napoleonic era

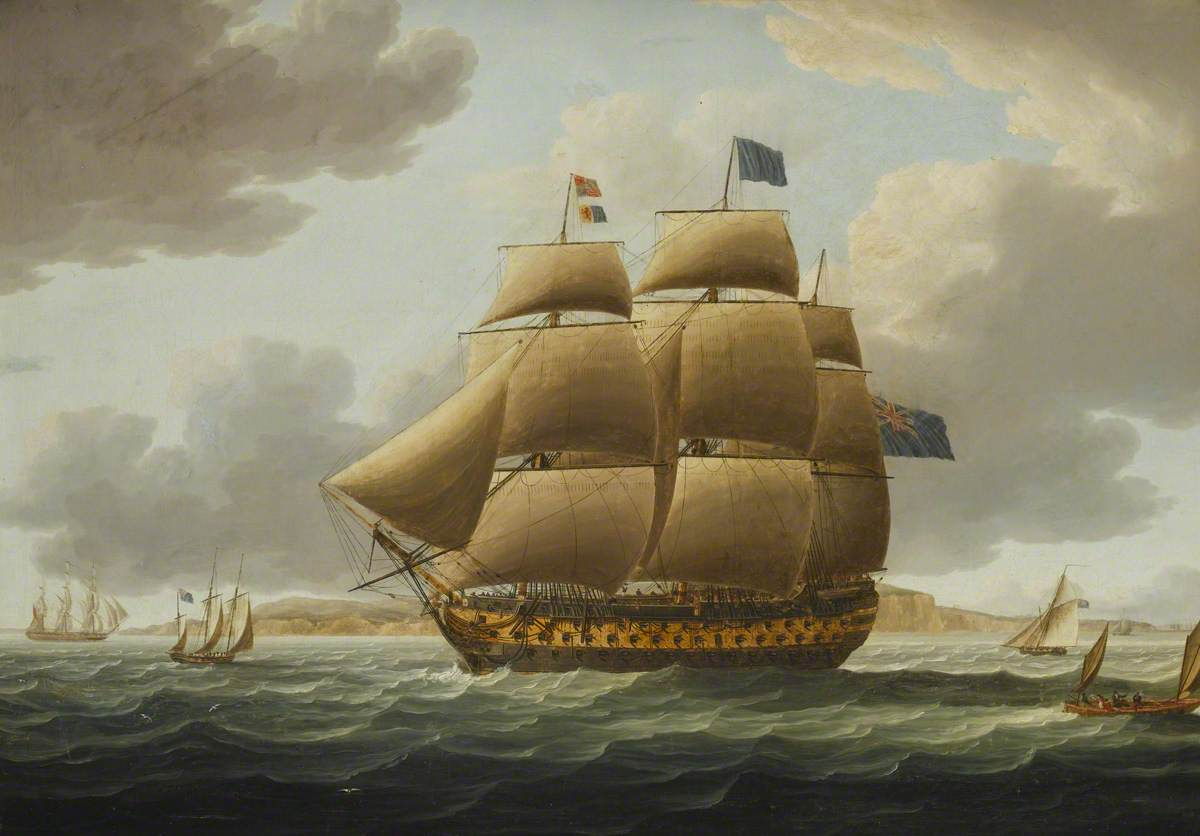
- The Ship 'Ville de Paris' under Full Sail, Thomas Buttersworth

History

Great Britain
- Name: HMS Ville de Paris
- Ordered: 25 May 1788
- Builder: Chatham Dockyard
- Laid down: 1 July 1789
- Launched: 17 July 1795
- Nickname(s): Willy de Parry
- Fate: Broken up, 1845

General characteristics
- Class & type: 110-gun first rate ship of the line
- Tons burthen: 2351 (bm)
- Length: 190 ft (58 m) (gundeck)
- Beam: 53 ft (16 m)
- Depth of hold: 22 ft 4 in (6.81 m)
- Propulsion: Sails
- Sail plan: Full-rigged ship
- Armament: 110 guns: Gundeck: 30 × 32-pounder guns; Middle gundeck: 30 × 24-pounder guns; Upper gundeck: 32 × 18-pounder guns; QD: 14 × 12-pounder guns; Fc: 4 × 12-pounder guns

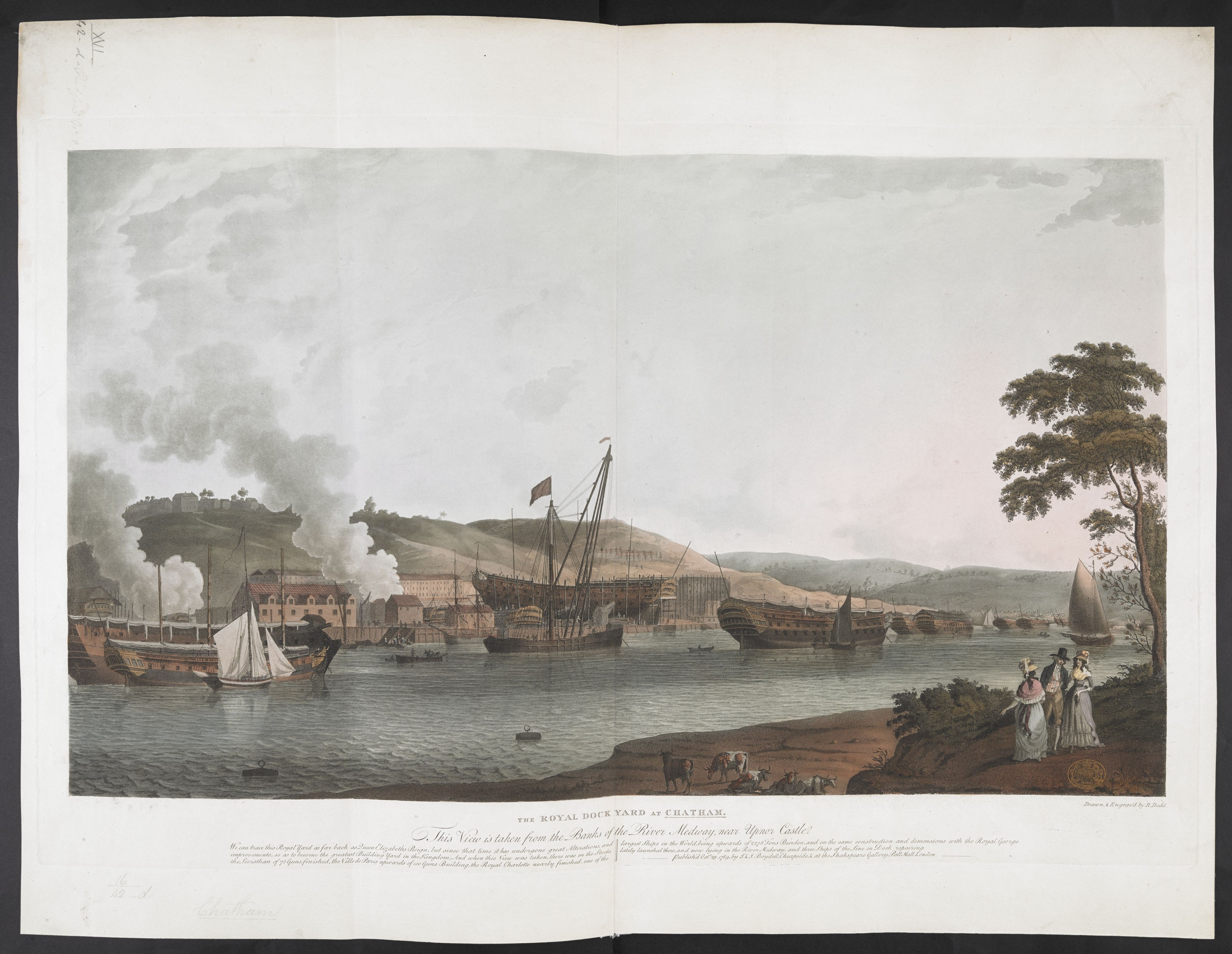
Ville de Paris during construction, at the Royal Dockyard Chatham, 1789

HMS Ville de Paris was a 110-gun first rate ship of the line of the Royal Navy, launched on 17 July 1795 at Chatham Dockyard. She was designed by Sir John Henslow, and was the only ship built to her draught. She was named after the French ship of the line Ville de Paris, flagship of François Joseph Paul de Grasse during the American Revolutionary War. That ship had been captured by the Royal Navy at the Battle of the Saintes in April 1782, but in September of that year on the voyage to England as a prize, she sank in a hurricane.

She served as the flagship of John Jervis, 1st Earl of St Vincent, with the Channel Fleet.

On 17 August 1803, the boats of Ville de Paris captured the French privateer Messager from among the rocks off Ushant. Lloyd's Patriotic Fund awarded Lieutenant Watts, of Ville de Paris, with an honour sword worth £50 for his role in the cutting out expedition. Messager was pierced for eight guns but had six mounted, and had her owner and 40 men aboard when Watts arrived with his pinnace and 18 men. The British captured her before the other boats from Ville de Paris could arrive. The French put up a minimal resistance and only suffered a few men lightly wounded; the British suffered no casualties. The action occurred in sight of the hired armed cutter Nimrod. In January 1805 head and prize money from the proceeds of the French privateer Messager was due to be paid.

On 18 January 1808, following the Battle of Corunna, Ville de Paris (Captain John Surman Carden) evacuated twenty-three officers of the 50th, three of the 43rd, four of the 26th, three of the 18th, one of the 76th, two of the 52nd, two of the 36th, four Royal Engineers, and two Royal Artillery - a total of 44 officers, including General Sir David Baird, his ADC Captain Hon Alexander Gordon, Sir John Colborne and Lieutenant Henry Percy. Ville de Paris also embarked several thousand soldiers.

Later, Admiral Collingwood died aboard her of cancer while on service in the Mediterranean, off Port Mahón, on 7 March 1810.

On 22 July 1814, at the conclusion of the Peninsula War, Ville de Paris arrived off Portsmouth carrying the 43rd Light Infantry Battalion along with the 2nd Rifles.

Ville de Paris was placed on harbour service in 1824, and she was broken up in 1845.
