= Kadalur Point Lighthouse =

Lighthouse in Kerala, India

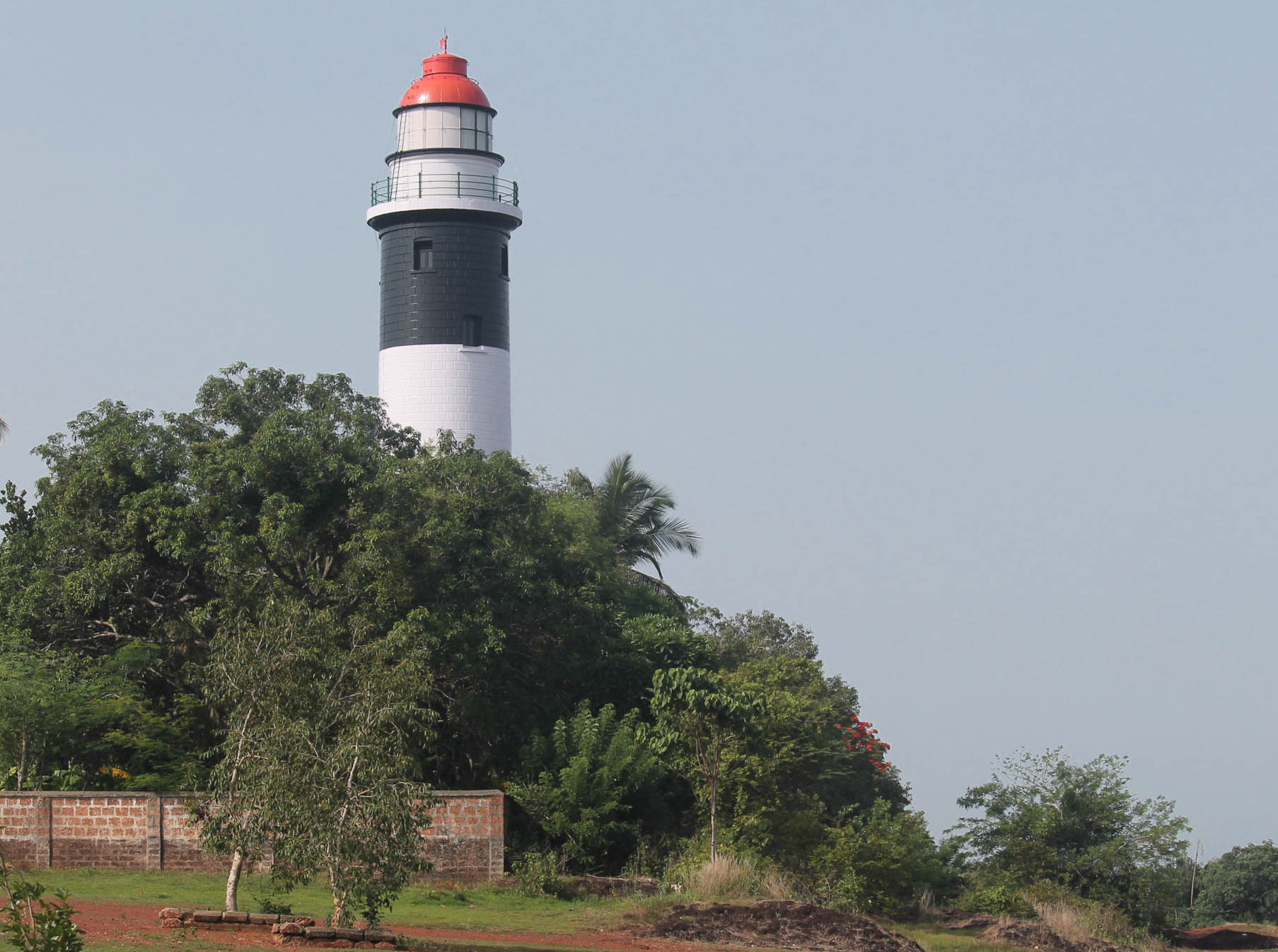
- Lighthouse from the beach
- Location: Kozhikode, Kerala
- Coordinates: 11°28′08.6″N 75°38′14.1″E

Tower
- Construction: concrete tower
- Height: 34 metres (112 ft)
- Shape: cylindrical tower with balcony and lantern
- Markings: black and white horizontal bands, red dome
- Power source: mains electricity

Light
- First lit: 1909
- Focal height: 57 metres (187 ft)
- Range: 23 nautical miles (43 km; 26 mi)
- Characteristic: Fl W 5s.

The Kadalur Point Lighthouse is situated in Kadalur, near Koyilandy in Kozhikode district on the coast of Arabian sea in India. The circular stone masonry tower has a height of 34 meters. The tower is painted with black and white bands. The lighthouse started its operation in 1907. The light source is a metal halide lamp. In the 18th Century Kadalur Point was known as Cotta Point. It is believed that the lighthouse was built after a shipwreck on the rocky shores at the point and one can still see the remains of it.

== History ==
The Kadalur Point Lighthouse was commissioned on 20 October 1909 by the Directorate General of Lighthouses and Lightships to warn mariners of the submerged "Sacrifice Rock" located about 10 km offshore, after repeated ship groundings in the area. Initially equipped with a Chance Brothers 700 mm second‑order revolving dioptric lens and paraffin vapor (PV) burner, the original apparatus served reliably until its first major upgrade on 16 March 1995, when the PV unit was replaced by a 230 V, 400 W incandescent electrical lamp. Just over a year later, on 8 August 1996, the incandescent lamp was superseded by a 230 V, 400 W metal‑halide (HPI‑T) lamp along with a direct‑drive rotating mechanism. Routine conservation efforts, including structural repairs and vegetation clearance, have been proposed intermittently to preserve the lighthouse as both a heritage monument and an active aid to navigation.

== Structure ==
The tower stands 34 m tall and consists of a circular stone-masonry construction that tapers slightly toward the top, enhancing its wind resistance along the coast. It was built on a rocky promontory, the tower's foundations are set directly on bedrock, ensuring stability. The interior is accessed via a spiral staircase composed of 246 plastered steps followed by 15 wooden steps, leading to the gallery with a focal plane at 57 m above mean sea level, high enough to clear seasonal surges. Optically, it retains the original Chance Brothers second-order 700 mm revolving dioptric lens, now illuminated by a 230 V, 400 W metal-halide (HPI‑T) lamp, powered by mains electricity and backed by a generator maintaining a strong beam for maritime navigation. The light has an effective range of 23 nautical miles, ensuring ships are warned of the nearby shoals.

== See also ==
- List of lighthouses in India
