= HMS Ramillies (1763) =

Ship of the line of the Royal Navy

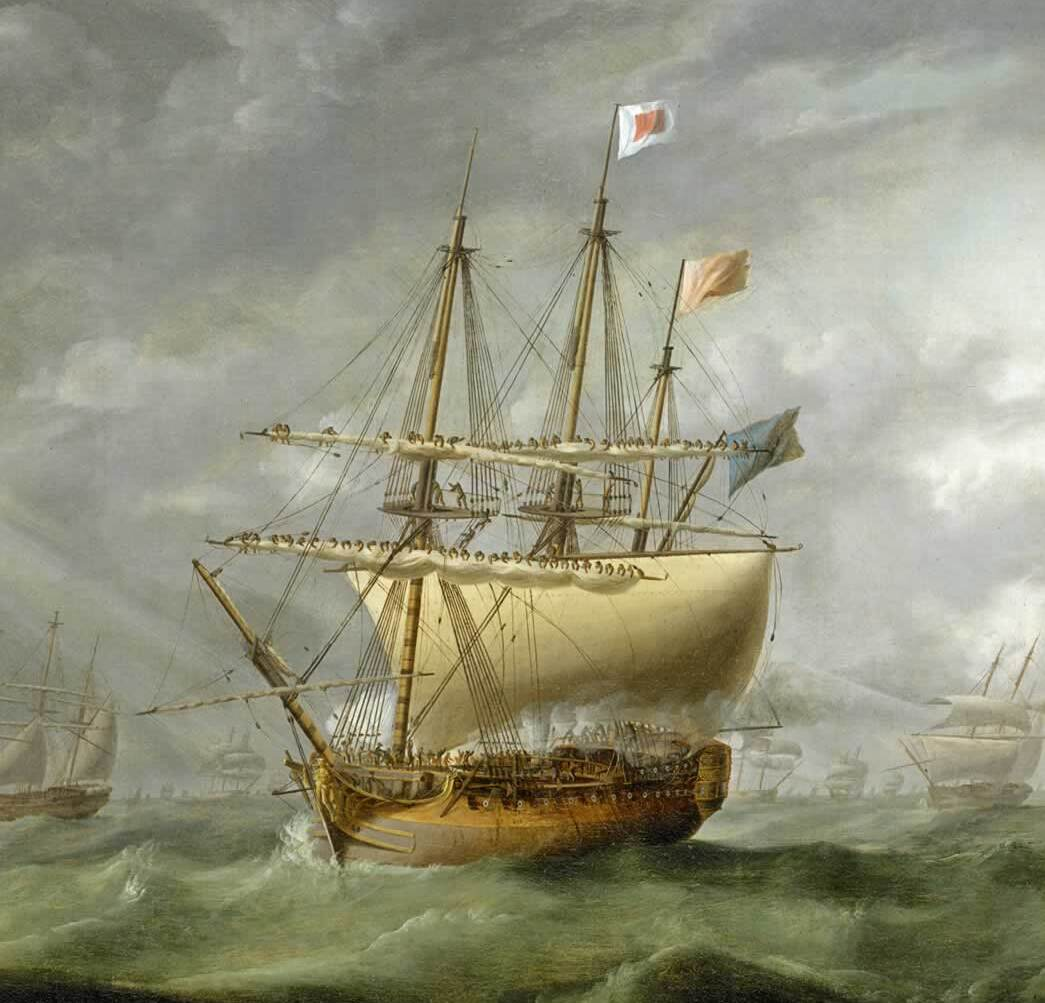
- Painting of Ramillies (centre) in the 1782 Central Atlantic hurricane

History

Great Britain
- Name: HMS Ramillies
- Ordered: 1 December 1759
- Builder: Chatham Dockyard
- Launched: 15 April 1763
- Fate: Scuttled on 21 September 1782

General characteristics
- Class & type: Ramillies-class ship of the line
- Tons burthen: 1619 (bm)
- Length: 168 ft 6 in (51.36 m) (gundeck)
- Beam: 46 ft 9 in (14.25 m)
- Depth of hold: 19 ft 9 in (6.02 m)
- Propulsion: Sails
- Sail plan: Full-rigged ship
- Armament: Gundeck: 28 × 32-pounder guns; Upper gundeck: 28 × 18-pounder guns; QD: 14 × 9-pounder guns; Fc: 4 × 9-pounder guns

HMS Ramillies was a 74-gun third-rate ship of the line of the Royal Navy. Launched on 15 April 1763 at Chatham Dockyard, she served in the American War of Independence. Her duties primarily included escorting convoys of merchant ships. Ramillies was scuttled on 21 September 1782 during the 1782 Central Atlantic hurricane.

== Career ==
Ramillies served in the American War of Independence, participating in the Battle of Ushant on 27 July 1778.

She subsequently took part in the action of 9 August 1780, when a British convoy she was escorting (was attacked by a larger Spanish Navy squadron of 32 ships of the line. Under the command of John Moutray, the British warships fled. 55 merchant ships of the convoy were captured, along with some 1,350 seaman and 1,250 soldiers of the 90th Regiment taken prisoner. Ramillies managed to escape. The loss of the Convoy amounted to some £1,500,000, one of the largest convoy disasters in the 18th century.

In 1782 she became the flagship of a British squadron under Admiral Thomas Graves at Port Royal, Jamaica. Between 16 and 19 September 1782, while escorting a British convoy from Jamaica to Britain, Ramillies was caught in the 1782 Central Atlantic hurricane. Despite frantic efforts to save the ship, including jettisoning anchors, cannon, and masts, and using ropes to bind the hull, the water continued to rise. After three days of pumping by the ship's crew, they left Ramillies and were rescued by nearby merchantmen. The ship's captain Sylverius Moriarty had the Ramillies set on fire as he left.

The English artist Robert Dodd painted a series of five painting documenting the ship's destruction. "The demise of the Ramillies" comprises: "A Storm coming on", "The Storm increas'd", "The Ramillies Water Logg'd with her Admiral & Crew quitting the Wreck", "Ship abandoned in abating storm" and "The Ramillies Destroyed". In 1795 a set of four coloured mezzotints were engraved and published by Francis Jukes.

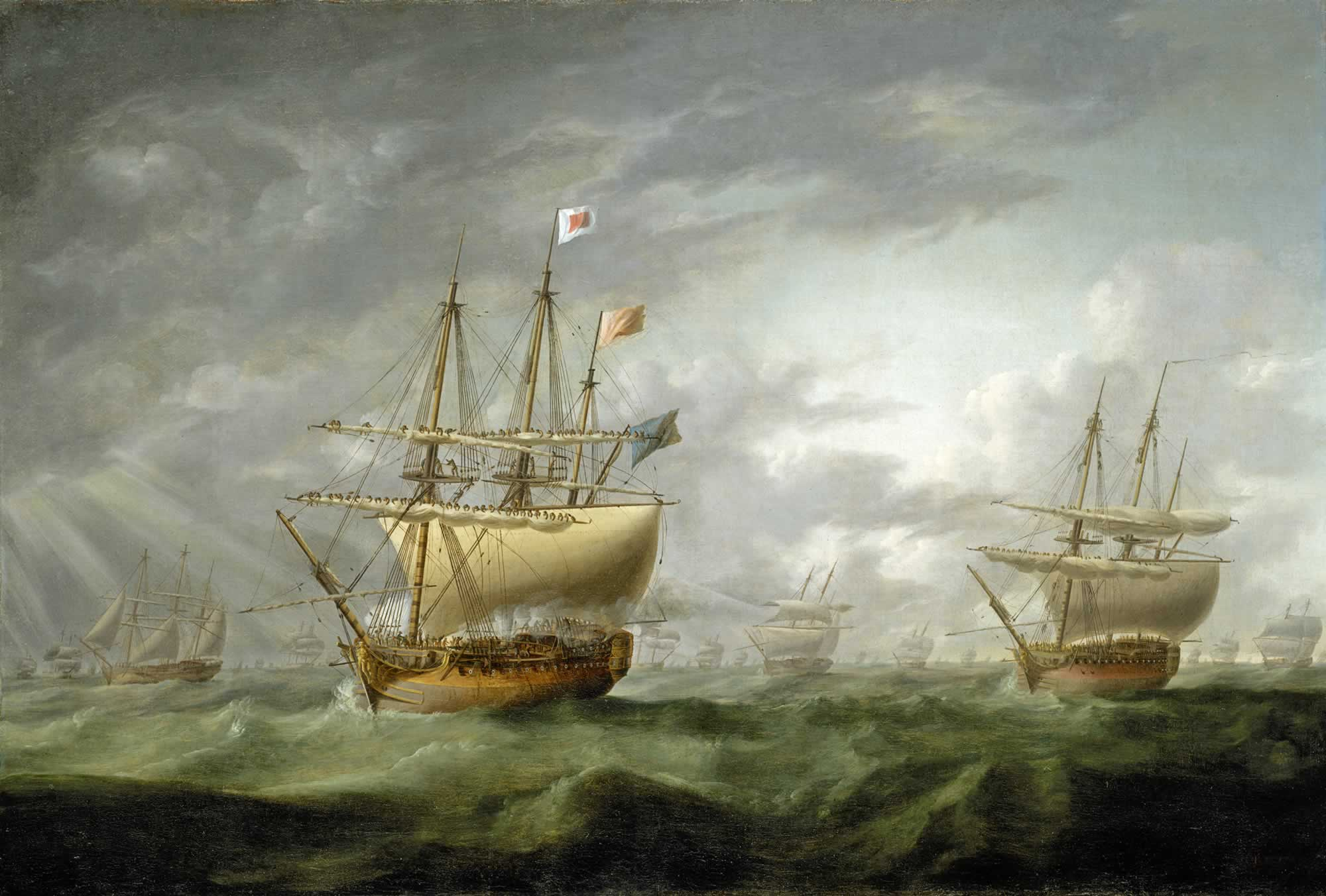
A Storm Coming On

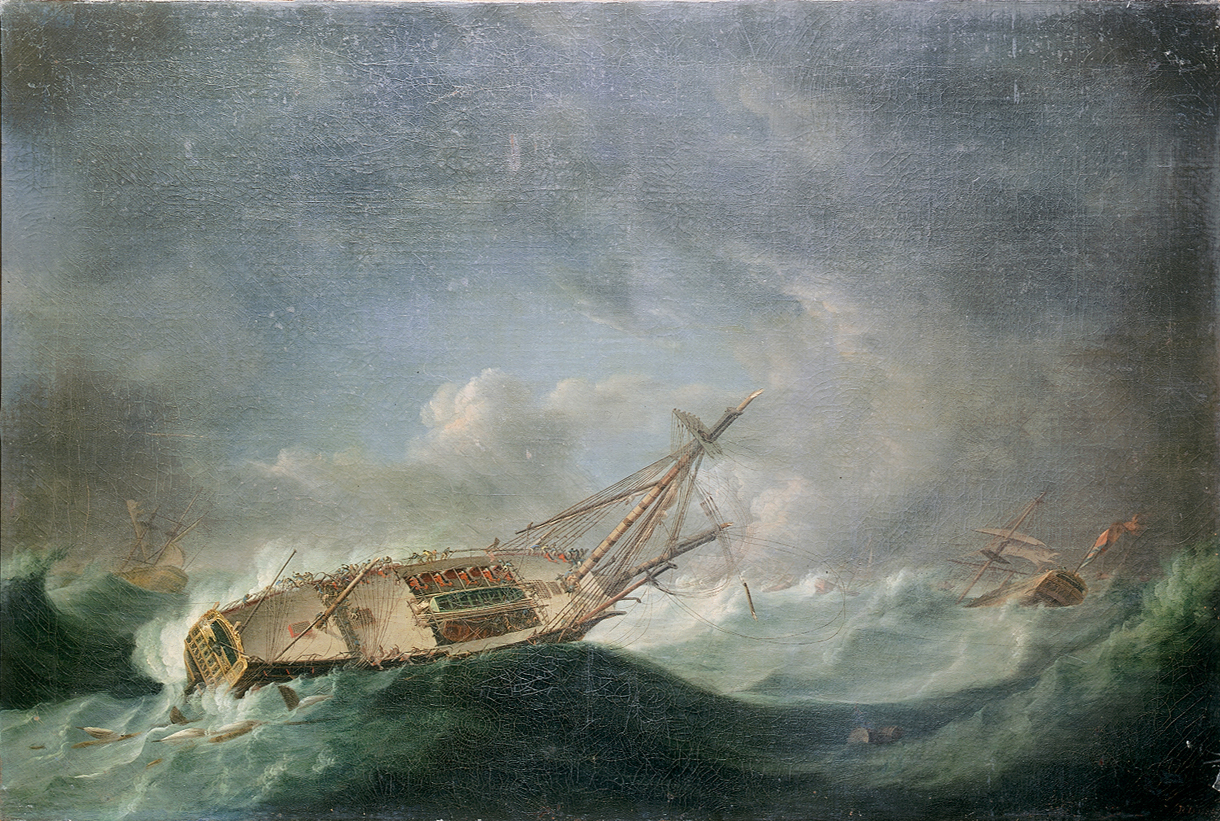
The Storm increas'd. Distressed situation of the Ramillies when Day broke with the Dutton Store Ship foundering

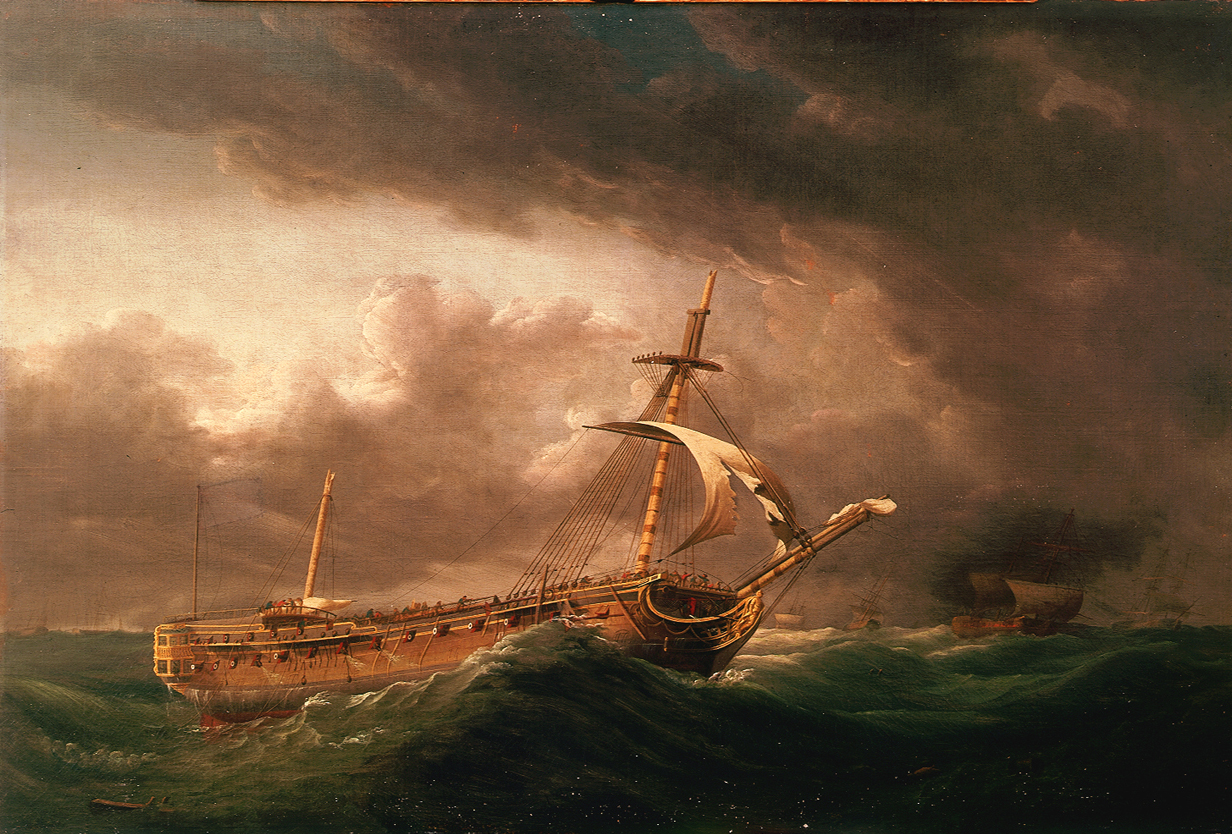
The Ramillies Water Logg'd with her Admiral & Crew quitting the Wreck

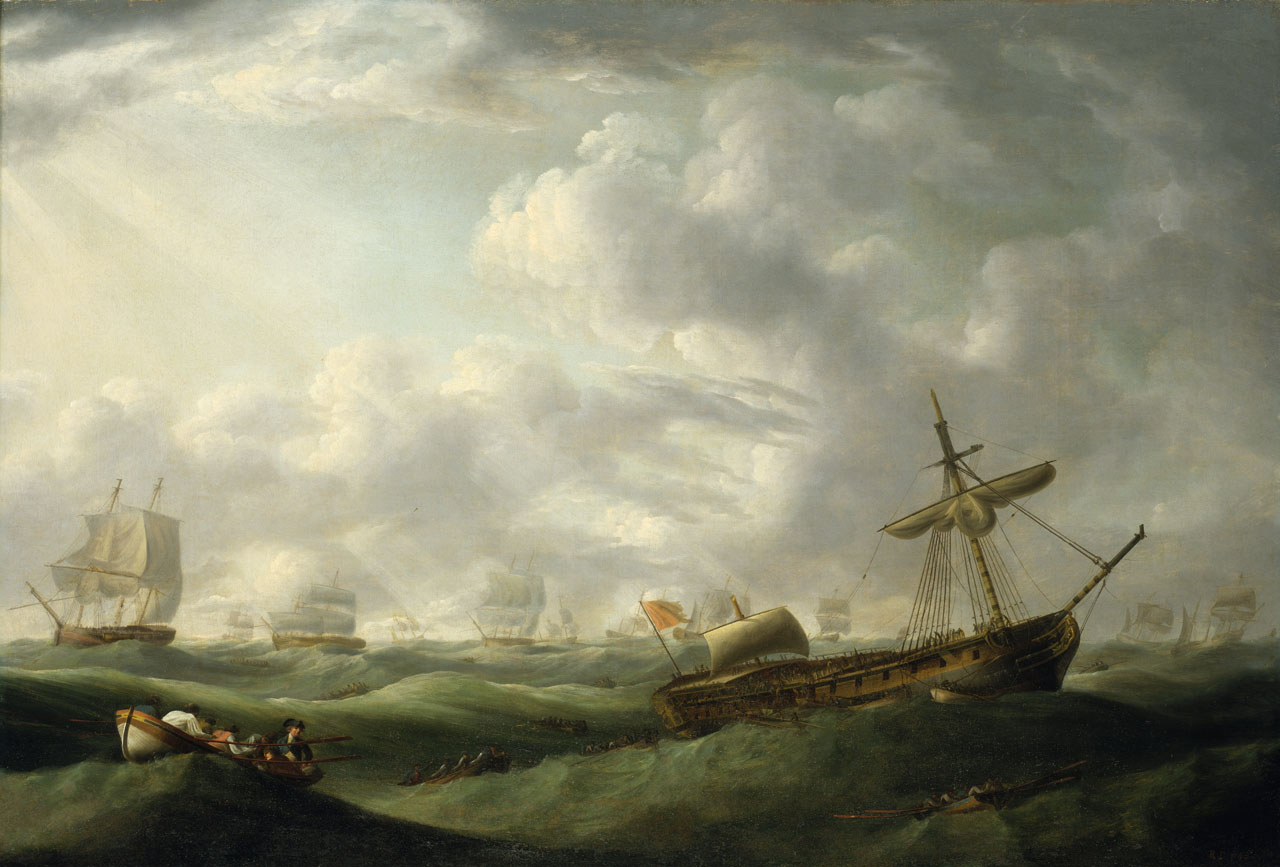
Ship abandoned in abating storm

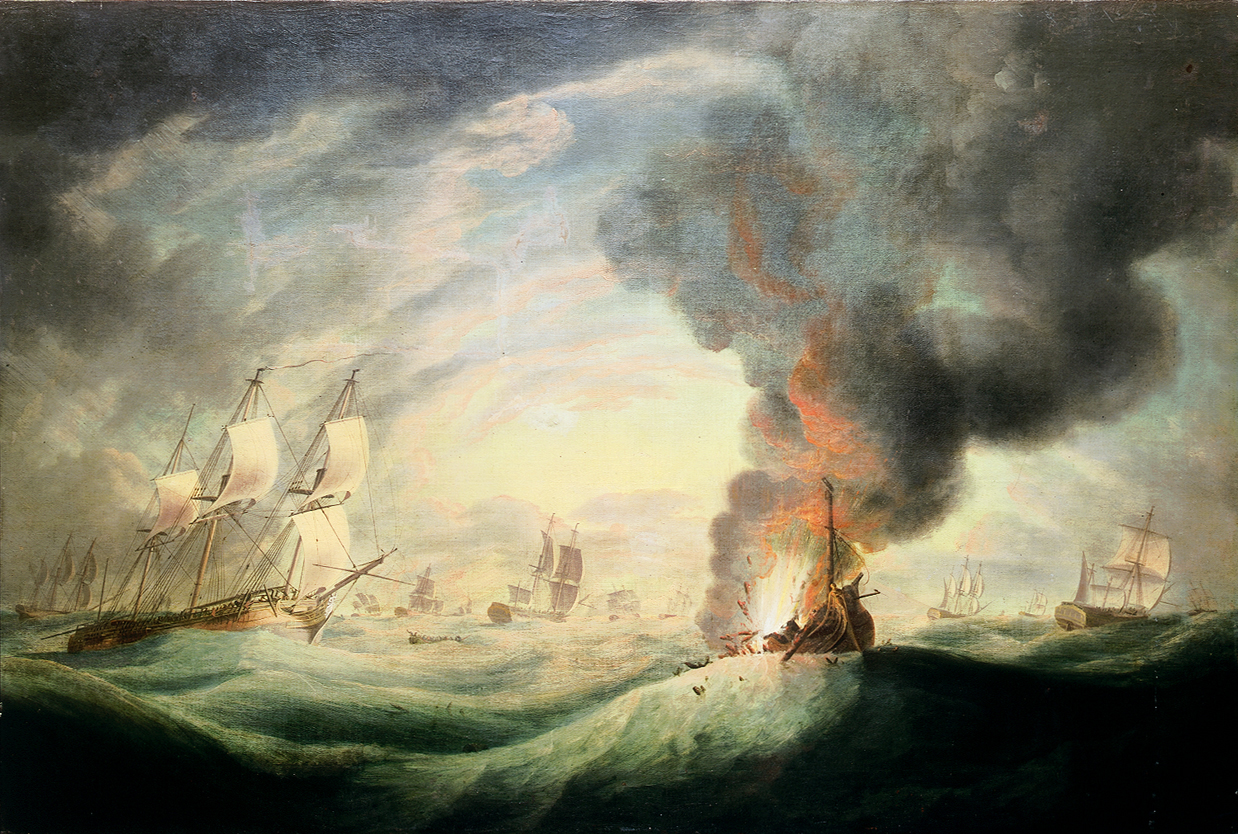
Blowing up of the wreck
