= Antoine Hilarion de Beausset =

French Navy officer

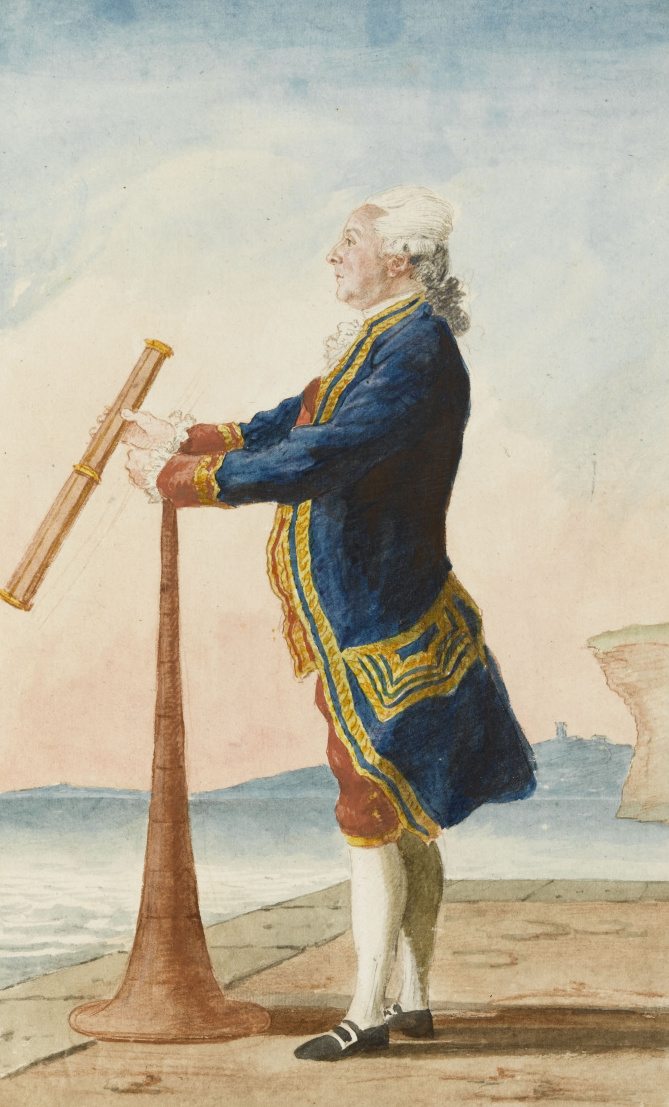
- Born: 1725
- Died: 1795 (aged 69–70)
- Allegiance: France
- Branch: French Navy
- Rank: Lieutenant général des armées navales
- Conflicts: American Revolutionary War; Battle of Ushant (1778)

Antoine Hilarion de Beausset (Note: Also written "Bausset") (1725 – 1795) was a French Navy officer who served in the American Revolutionary War.

== Biography ==
In 1775, Beausset captained the 32-gun frigate Oiseau in the Escadre d'évolution under Guichen.

In 1777, he was captain of the 70-gun Dauphin Royal.

In 1778, Proisy captained the 74-gun Glorieux, part of the White-and-blue squadron under Du Chaffault in the fleet under Orvilliers. He took part in the Battle of Ushant on 27 July 1778. His nephew, Vallongue, was a Lieutenant on the same ship.

The year after, he was part on the Armada of 1779 as Chef d'Escadre on Glorieux.

In 1780, Beausset was commanding a four-ship division. In mid-January, the division departed Brest, arriving at Cadiz on 13 February. From there, he patrolled the Gulf of Biscay to chase British privateers. Such a sortie let to the action of 9 August 1780, where the Franco-Spanish forces captured 55 merchantmen. Beausset chased the retreating British escort, comprising the 74-gun HMS Ramillies and the frigates Thetis and Southampton. The Franco-Spanish under Córdova patrolled until September, and Beausset advocated that they engage in more aggressive commerce raiding, but Córdova ordered his squadron back to port on 5 September.

In 1782, Beausset had his flag on the 110-gun Royal Louis, with Verdun de La Crenne as flag captain. On 20 October, the Franco-Spanish fleet and the British fleet met off Cape Spartel. Lamotte-Piquet, who commanded the vanguard of the fleet, moved to engage, precipitating the Battle of Cape Spartel. Royal Louis and most of the fleet remained largely out of action. La Crenne requested permission to engage, but Beausset refused and insulted Lamotte-Piquet in front of the crew. When he heard of it, Estaing relieved Beausset and sent him back to France. Consequently, Beausset was not chosen for promotion when two new lieutenant généraux were commissioned.

In 1789, Beausset was a member of the Navy Council, with the rank of lieutenant général des armées navales.

== Sources and references ==
Notes

Citations

References

- Chack, Paul (2001). Marins à bataille (in French). Vol. 1. Paris: Le Gerfaut. ISBN 9782901196921. OCLC 552986998.
- Lacour-Gayet, Georges (1905). La marine militaire de la France sous le règne de Louis XVI. Paris: Honoré Champion. OCLC 763372623.
- Roche, Jean-Michel (2005). Dictionnaire des bâtiments de la flotte de guerre française de Colbert à nos jours. Vol. 1. Group Retozel-Maury Millau. ISBN 978-2-9525917-0-6. OCLC 165892922. (1671-1870)
- Taillemite, Étienne (1982). Dictionnaire des Marins français. Paris: Éditions maritimes et d'Outre-Mer. ISBN 9782707000316. OCLC 239744936.
- Troude, Onésime-Joachim (1867). Batailles navales de la France (in French). Vol. 2. Challamel ainé. OCLC 836362484.
