= François-Aymar de Monteil =

French Navy officer of the War of American Independence

- Born: 1725 Dauphiné, France
- Died: 10 September 1787 (aged 61–62) Galluis, France
- Branch: French Navy
- Rank: Lieutenant général des armées navales
- Conflicts: War of the Austrian Succession; Battle of Cape Sicié; Seven Years' War; Battle of Cuddalore; Battle of Negapatam; Battle of Pondicherry; American Revolutionary War

François-Aymar de Monteil (Dauphiné, 1725 — Galluis, 10 September 1787) was a French Navy officer. He served in the War of American Independence, earning membership in the Society of the Cincinnati. He was also a member and director of the Académie de Marine.

== Biography ==
Monteil joined the Navy as a Garde-Marine in 1741. He took part in the Battle of Cape Sicié on 22 February 1744, and was promoted to Ensign in 1746. That year, he served on the 24-gun frigate Volage, on which he was in combat against the 70-gun HMS Stirling Castle on 15 April. Volage was captured, but Oriflamme retook her the day after. In 1747, he served on the frigate Flore on convoy duty. Flore fought and captured a British ship during the mission.

In 1755, Monteil was given command of the 12-gun corvette Anémone at Cayenne. He was promoted to Lieutenant the year after, and served as Major for the squadron under admiral d'Aché, on Zodiaque, taking part in the Battle of Cuddalore on 29 April 1758 and in the Battle of Negapatam on 3 August.

Monteil was given command of the frigate Sylphide, and took part in the Battle of Pondicherry on 10 September 1759. On 30 mars 1759, he was made a Knight in the Order of Saint Louis for his conduct in the battle.

In 1762, Monteil was promoted to Captain, and given command of the 64-gun Éveillé in Newfoundland. On 13 April 1771, Monteil departed Port-Louis, commanding the ship Actionnaire bound for Isle de France (Mauritius). In 1774, Monteil captained Zéphir.

In 1776, he captained the 32-gun frigate Renommée, part of the Escadre d'évolution under Du Chaffault. On 20 April 1776, she touched a reef while departing Brest, and Monteil was unable to immediately refloat Renommée. Du Chaffault defended Monteil, writing to the Navy Minister that "only those who command ships run the risk of losing them". (Note: Il n'y a que ceux qui commandent les vaisseaux qui soient dans le cas de les perdre)

In 1778, Monteil commanded the 74-gun Conquérant, part of the Third division in the Blue squadron of the fleet under Orvilliers. He took part in the Battle of Ushant on 27 July 1778, where he was wounded.

Monteil was promoted to Chef d'Escadre in 1779. In 1780, he was given command of the squadron of the Caribbean, comprising five 74-gun ships, four 64-gun ships and 6 smaller units, with his flag on the 74-gun Palmier, although he remained largely idle. He took part in the Siege of Pensacola in May 1781. He then returned at Cap-Français, arriving on 10 July.

On 17 July 1781, transferred to command of the Blue squadron (rear) in De Grasse's fleet, with his flag on the 80-gun Languedoc. Before his squadron departed, an accidental fire destroyed the 74-gun Intrépide, which exploded. Monteil took part in the Battle of the Chesapeake on 5 September 1781.

On 25 November 1782, he became an Ordinary member of the Académie de Marine. Monteil was promoted to Lieutenant général des armées navales on 8 February 1783.
