= Henry-César Boscal de Réals =

French Navy officer

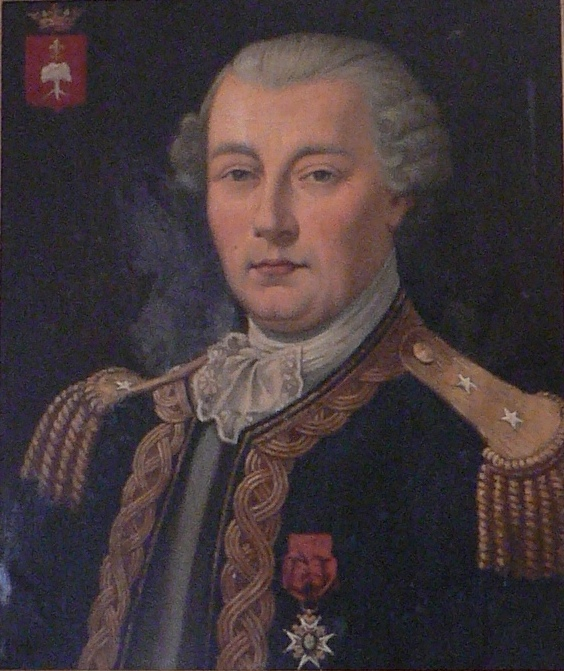
- Born: 28 March 1723; Rochefort, Kingdom of France
- Died: 17 October 1795 (aged 72) Daoulas, French First Republic
- Allegiance: Kingdom of France
- Branch: French Navy
- Service years: 1741–1782
- Rank: Chef d'escadre
- Conflicts: War of the Austrian Succession; Battle of Toulon; Seven Years' War; American Revolutionary War; Battle of Ushant
- Awards: Order of Saint Louis; Society of the Cincinnati

Henry-César Boscal de Réals (Rochefort, 28 March 1723 – Daoulas, 17 October 1795) was a French Navy officer. He notably served during the War of American Independence.

== Biography ==
Réals was born to a family with a strong naval tradition: his father was a Navy captain, and his two brother were also Navy officers.

Réals joined the Navy as a Garde-Marine in 1741, and took part in the Battle of Toulon on 22 February 1744 on Espérance. He served on Terrible in 1746, and on Favorite in 1747.

Réals was promoted to Lieutenant in 1756, and appointed to Friponne. He then transferred to Actif and spent four years serving in the Indian Ocean.

In 1771, Réals rose to Captain.

In 1778, Proisy captained the 74-gun Palmier, part of the White-and-blue squadron under Du Chaffault in the fleet under Orvilliers. He took part in the Battle of Ushant on 27 July 1778.

He was later promoted to Brigadier, and retired in 1782 with the rank of Chef d'Escadre. During the French Revolution, he was arrested and detained in Daoulas, where he died in 1795.

== Sources and references ==
Notes

Citations

References

- Chack, Paul (2001). Marins à bataille (in French). Vol. 1. Paris: Le Gerfaut. ISBN 9782901196921. OCLC 552986998.
- Contenson, Ludovic (1934). La Société des Cincinnati de France et la guerre d'Amérique (1778-1783). Paris: éditions Auguste Picard. OCLC 7842336.
- Lacour-Gayet, Georges (1905). La marine militaire de la France sous le règne de Louis XVI. Paris: Honoré Champion. OCLC 763372623.
- Roche, Jean-Michel (2005). Dictionnaire des bâtiments de la flotte de guerre française de Colbert à nos jours. Vol. 1. Group Retozel-Maury Millau. ISBN 978-2-9525917-0-6. OCLC 165892922. (1671-1870)
- Taillemite, Étienne (1982). Dictionnaire des Marins français. Paris: Éditions maritimes et d'Outre-Mer. ISBN 9782707000316. OCLC 239744936.
- Troude, Onésime-Joachim (1867). Batailles navales de la France (in French). Vol. 2. Challamel ainé. OCLC 836362484.
