= Pierre de Roquefeuil-Montpeyroux =

French Navy officer of the War of American Independence

Pierre, count de Roquefeuil-Montpeyroux
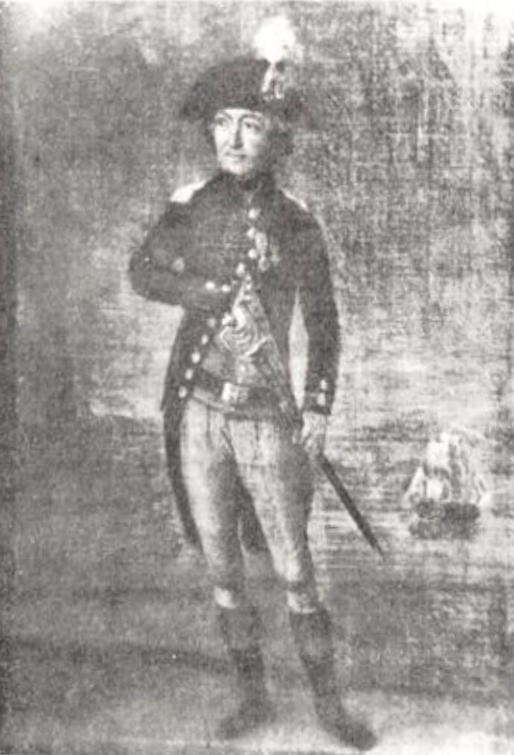
- Born: 1735; Chateau du Bousquet
- Died: 1789 (aged 53–54); La Forêt-Fouesnant
- Spouse: Léonie de Lagadec
- Children: Adolphe; Alphonce-Louis
- Military career
- Allegiance: Kingdom of France
- Branch: French Navy
- Service years: 1749–1782
- Rank: Brigadier des armées navales
- Commands: Oiseau (1777); Saint-Esprit (1778); Renommée (1779-80); Zodiaque (1780); Dauphin Royal (1781)
- Conflicts: American War of Independence; Battle of the Saintes; Battle of Ushant
- Awards: Knight in the Order of Saint Louis

Pierre de Roquefeuil-Montpeyroux (Note: Also written "Montpéroux".) was a French Navy officer. He served during the War of American Independence.

== Biography ==
Roquefeuil was born in 1735 to the House of Roquefeuil-Blanquefort. He grew up in Montpeyroux, Aveyron where his family owned the Château du Bousquet.

On 19 September 1749, he joined the French Navy as a Garde-Marine. He was promoted to lieutenant on 1 May 1763.

In 1773, he was made a Knight in the Order of Saint Louis.

On 4 April 1777, he was promoted to captain and given command of the 32-gun frigate Oiseau. He served Du Chaffault.

In 1778, named flag captain on the 80-gun ship Saint-Esprit, Roquefeuil participated to the battle of Ushant under Lamotte-Picquet.

In 1779, he was given command of the frigate Renommée, with which he captured two British ships. He then transferred to the 74-gun Zodiaque.

From 1781, he commanded the 74-gun Dauphin Royal. He took part in the Battle of the Saintes on 12 April 1782, and was later cleared by the inquiry into the battle.

In 1783, he earned a membership in the Society of the Cincinnati.

He retired on 8 February 1786 with the rank of brigadier des armées navales, on medical grounds.

Pierre de Roquefeuil-Montpeyroux died in 1789 in Brittany.

== Family ==
In 1783, Roquefeuil married Léocadie de Lagadec with whom he had two children:

- Adolphe, (Note: Also known as Alfonse.)
- Alphonse-Louis.

Pierre de Roquefeuil-Montpeyroux is also the nephew of:

- Jacques Aymar de Roquefeuil et du Bousquet (1665-1744),
- Aymar Joseph de Roquefeuil et du Bousquet (1714-1782).

== Sources and references ==
Notes

Citations

References

- Contenson, Ludovic (1934). La Société des Cincinnati de France et la guerre d'Amérique (1778-1783). Paris: éditions Auguste Picard. OCLC 7842336.
- Lacour-Gayet, Georges (1910). La marine militaire de la France sous le règne de Louis XVI. Paris: Honoré Champion. pp. 431–434.
- Roche, Jean-Michel (2005). Dictionnaire des bâtiments de la flotte de guerre française de Colbert à nos jours. Vol. 1. Group Retozel-Maury Millau. ISBN 978-2-9525917-0-6. OCLC 165892922.
- Troude, Onésime-Joachim (1867). Batailles navales de la France (in French). Vol. 2. Challamel ainé.
- Jougla de Morenas, Henri. Grand Armorial de France (PDF) (in French). Vol. 6.
