= French frigate Terpsichore (1763) =

History

France
- Name: Terpsichore
- Ordered: 22 December 1762
- Builder: Indret
- Laid down: July 1762
- Launched: 10 August 1763
- In service: December 1763
- Fate: Sold in August 1783

General characteristics
- Displacement: 1000 tonneaux
- Tons burthen: 600 port tonneaux
- Length: 45.7 metres
- Beam: 11.1 metres
- Depth of hold: 4.9 metres
- Armament: Gun deck: 30 × 12-pounder long guns; Quarterdeck and forecastle: 6 lighter guns

Terpsichore was a 36-gun frigate of the French Navy. She took part in the War of American Independence.

== Career ==
Terpsichore took part in operations against the Salé Rovers, under Captain Jean-François Aubé de Braquemont, along with Danaé.

In 1775, she was the flagship of the Escadre d'évolution under Guichen, conducting exercises from Brest with a 12-ship division comprising four frigates, five corvettes, a lugger and two cutters, and 1885 men. In June 1776, she collided with Solitaire and both ships had to repair in Cadiz.

In 1776, she was under Poute de Nieuil, at Rochefort, in the squadron under Du Chaffault.

In 1779, she was under Lombard, cruising first around Ile de Ré, Ile d'Aix and Brest, and then part of the squadron under Orvilliers.

== Fate ==
Terpsichore was condemned in Brest in August 1783, and sold in March 1787.
