= Nicholas-Hyacinthe de Botderu =

Nicholas-Hyacinthe de Botderu (Note: Also written "Botdéru" or "Boderue") (1732—1801) was a French Navy officer. He notably served during the War of American Independence.

== Biography ==
Botderu married Jeanne de Mauduit du Plessis. They had three daughters.

In 1777, Botderu was captain of the 32-gun frigate Inconstante, part of the squadron under Du Chaffault.

In 1778, Botderu captained the 64-gun Éveillé, part of the White-and-blue squadron under Du Chaffault in the fleet under Orvilliers. He took part in the Battle of Ushant on 27 July 1778.

In 1781, he was at Saint-Domingue and in Brest. He took part in the Siege of Pensacola, (Note: One mention of the siege in Kérallain incorrectly dates the siege to 1779.) commanding a 700-man landing party. On 17 July, he was given command of the 64-gun Vaillant.

On 6 March 1785, he was promoted to Brigadier des Armées navales.
