= Vincent-Joseph-Marie de Proisy de Brison =

French Navy officer

Vincent-Joseph-Marie de Proisy de Brison (Note: Also written "Proissy") (died 28 July 1779, in Brest) was a French Navy officer. He notably served during the War of American Independence.

== Biography ==
Proisy was born to the family of Jeanne-Marie-Françoise de Héron and of Alphonse de Proisy. His older brother, La Salle Proisy, also served in the Navy. Proisy joined the Navy as a Garde-Marine on 26 November 1745.

Proisy was promoted to Lieutenant on 17 April 1757. On 23 May 1758, he married Pélagie Gouyon. On 19 March 1763, he was made a Knight in the Order of Saint Louis.

In 1765, he commanded the fluyt Forte, carrying wook from Pyrenees. In 1769, he commanded the 12-gun corvette Écureuil between Saint -Domingue and Brest. In 1770, he sailed her to Guadeloupe.

Proisy was promoted to Captain on 24 March 1772. In 1778, Proisy captained the 64-gun Actionnaire, part of the White squadron under Orvilliers. He took part in the Battle of Ushant on 27 July 1778.

Proisy retired from the Navy on 1 July 1779.

== Sources and references ==
Notes

Citations

References

- Chack, Paul (2001). Marins à bataille (in French). Vol. 1. Paris: Le Gerfaut. ISBN 9782901196921. OCLC 552986998.
- Goüyon, Mériadec; Boisnard, Luc (2007). Les Gouyon Matignon : huit siècles d'histoire, leurs juveigneurs, leurs alliances et leurs demeures (in French). Mayenne, France: Éditions régionales de l'Ouest. ISBN 978-2-85554-128-0. OCLC 799734837.
- La Chenaye Desbois, François Alexandre Aubert (1776). Dictionnaire de la noblesse ... de France (in French). Vol. 11. Antoine Boudet. OCLC 163129892.
- Lacour-Gayet, Georges (1905). La marine militaire de la France sous le règne de Louis XVI. Paris: Honoré Champion. OCLC 763372623.
- Roche, Jean-Michel (2005). Dictionnaire des bâtiments de la flotte de guerre française de Colbert à nos jours. Vol. 1. Group Retozel-Maury Millau. ISBN 978-2-9525917-0-6. OCLC 165892922. (1671-1870)
- Taillemite, Étienne (1982). Dictionnaire des Marins français. Paris: Éditions maritimes et d'Outre-Mer. ISBN 9782707000316. OCLC 239744936.
- Troude, Onésime-Joachim (1867). Batailles navales de la France (in French). Vol. 2. Challamel ainé. OCLC 836362484.

External links

- Archives nationales (2011). "Fonds Marine, sous-série B/4: Campagnes, 1571-1785" (PDF).
