= Battle of Ushant (1778) =

1778 battle of the American Revolutionary War

- Part of the Anglo-French War
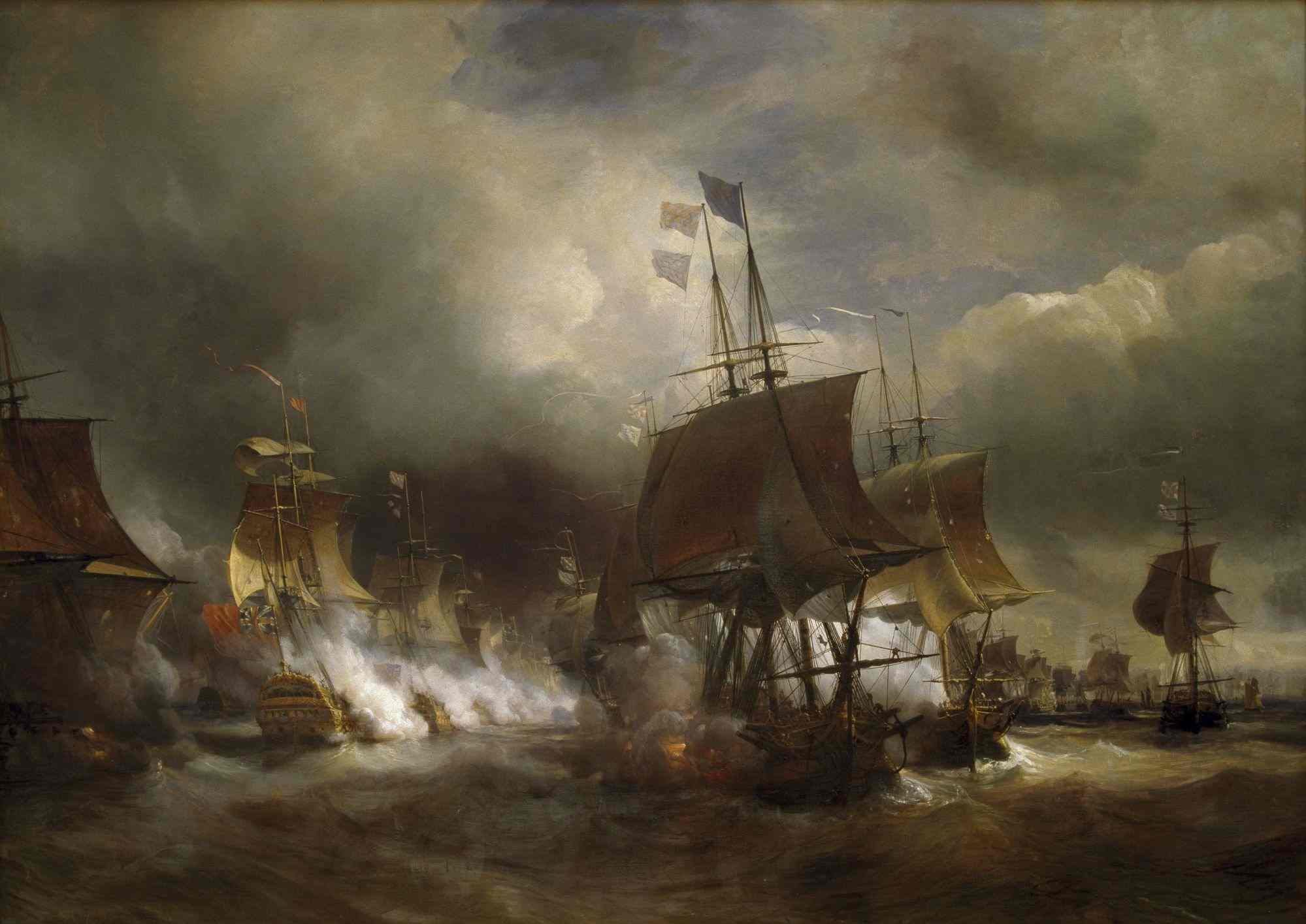
- Battle of Ushant, 23 July 1778; Théodore Gudin, 1839
Date	27 July 1778
Location	Off Ushant, Bay of Biscay 48°33′37″N 7°22′58″W
Result	Inconclusive

Belligerents
Great Britain	France

Commanders and leaders
Augustus Keppel; Hugh Palliser	Comte d'Orvilliers; Comte de Guichen

Strength
29 ships of the line	30 ships of the line

Casualties and losses
407 killed 789 wounded	126 killed 413 wounded

The Battle of Ushant (also called the First Battle of Ushant) took place on 27 July 1778, and was fought during the American Revolutionary War between French and British fleets 100 miles (160 km) west of Ushant, an island at the mouth of the English Channel off the westernmost point of France.

The French commander was under orders to avoid battle if possible, in order to maintain a fleet in being. The commanders of the two squadrons of the British fleet, Admiral of the Blue Augustus Keppel and Vice-Admiral of the Blue Sir Hugh Palliser, 1st Baronet, were already personally and politically at odds with each other, and failed to make a concerted attack on the French.

The battle, which was the first major naval engagement in the Anglo-French War of 1778, ended indecisively with no ships lost on either side and led to recriminations and political conflicts in both countries.

== Background ==
The British had a fleet of thirty ships-of-the-line, four frigates, and two fire-ships commanded by Admiral of the Blue Augustus Keppel, in HMS Victory, which sailed from Spithead on 9 July. The French fleet had thirty-two ships-of-the-line, seven frigates, five corvettes and one lugger, commanded by Vice-Admiral Comte d'Orvilliers, who had sailed from Brest on 8 July. Keppel sighted the French fleet west of Ushant at just after noon on 23 July. Keppel immediately ordered his battleships into line and set off in pursuit. At around 7 o'clock in the evening, the French fleet went about and began heading towards the British. Keppel, who did not wish to engage at night, had his ships hove to in response. In the morning, d'Orvilliers found himself to the north-west of the British fleet and cut off from Brest, although he retained the weather gage. Two of his ships, standing to leeward, escaped into port, leaving him with thirty ships-of-the-line. Keppel tried for three days to bring the French to action but d'Orvilliers declined, maintaining his position upwind and heading into the Atlantic.

== Battle ==
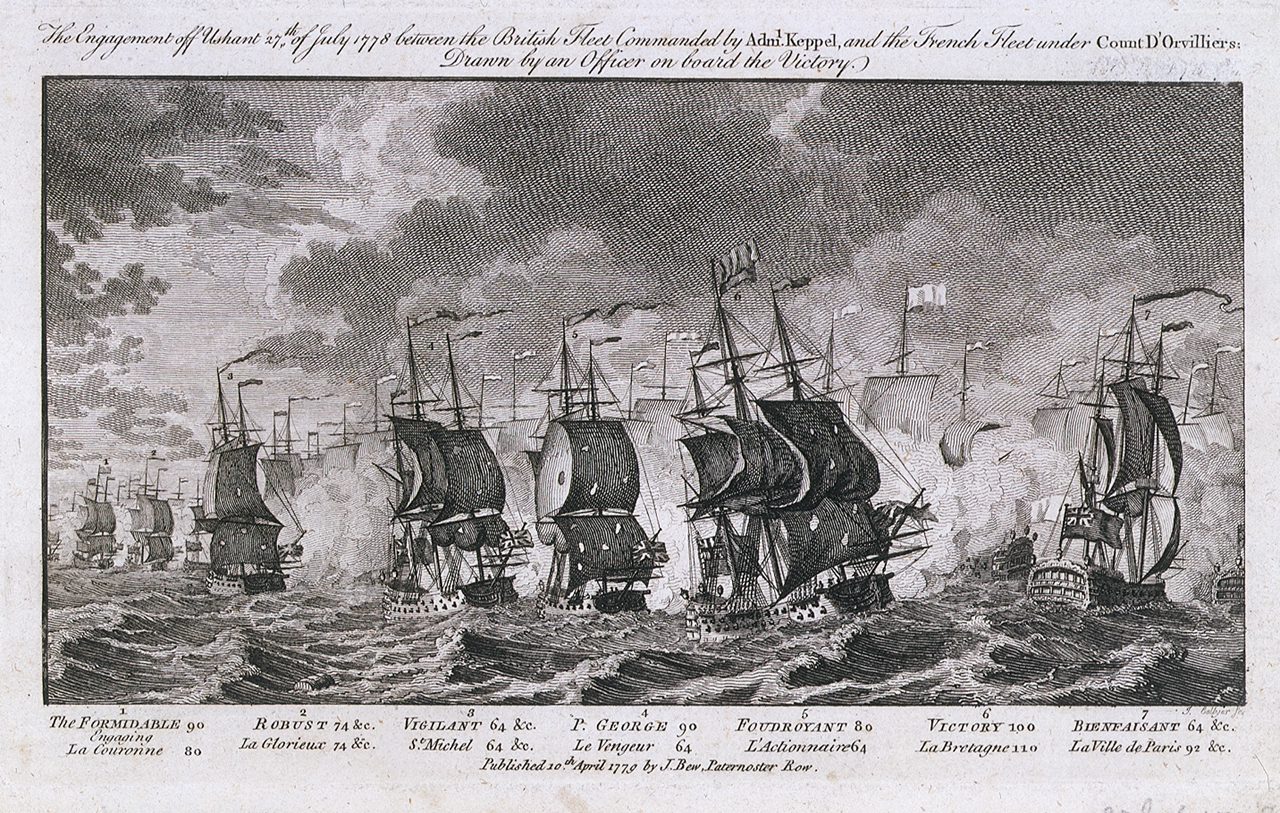
Depiction of the battle

At 6 a.m. on 27 July, with the British fleet roughly line-abreast, Keppel gave the order for the rear division, several miles away under Vice-Admiral of the Blue Sir Hugh Palliser, 1st Baronet, to chase to windward. At 9 a.m., the French, who had hitherto been sailing in the same direction, several miles to windward, went about once more. As the rearmost ships of the French fleet were tacking, however, the wind changed allowing the British to close the gap between them and their quarry. At 10:15 the British were slightly to leeward, line-ahead on the same course as the French. A little later, a change in wind direction brought about a rain squall which cleared at around 11 o'clock. A further change in wind direction to the south-west gave advantage to the British which d'Orvilliers sought to negate by ordering his ships about. The French, now heading towards the British in a loose formation, would pass slightly to windward.

The French ships were a few points off the wind and d'Orvilliers ordered them close hauled which caused the French line to veer slightly away from the British. The battle began at 11:20 when the fourth French ship in the line was able to bring her guns to bear. Keppel, who wished to save his salvo for the enemy flagship, received the broadsides of six French ships without reply. Once he had engaged the 110-gun Bretagne, he continued to attack the next six ships in the French line.

As the British van under Robert Harland passed the end of the French line, Harland ordered his ships about so as to chase the French rearguard, including the Sphinx. Palliser's ten ships at the rear had not formed line of battle but were instead in a loose irregular formation. This was in part due to Keppel's earlier order to break off and chase the French ships to windward. Palliser's division therefore was badly mauled, having allowed itself to be attacked piecemeal. At 1 p.m. Victory passed the last French ship and attempted to follow Harland but was so badly damaged in the masts and rigging that Keppel had to wear round and it was 2 p.m. before his ships were on the opposite tack. It was about this time that Palliser in Formidable emerged from the battle, downwind of Keppel's division.

Meanwhile, the French line had tacked and was now heading south on the starboard tack and threatening to pass the British fleet to leeward. The French practice of firing high into the rigging had left several of the British ships disabled and it was this group that Keppel now stood down towards whilst making the signal, 'form line of battle'. By 4 p.m., Harland's division had gone about and joined Keppel's ships in line but Palliser would not or could not conform and his ships, misunderstanding Keppel's intentions, formed line with their commander, several miles upwind from the rest of the British fleet. D'Orvilliers did not, however, attack the British fleet while it was divided into three sections but instead continued his course, passing the British fleet to leeward.

At 5 p.m., Keppel sent the sixth-rate, HMS Fox, to demand that Palliser join the main body of the fleet and when this failed, at 7, Keppel removed Palliser from the chain of command by individually signalling each ship in Palliser's division. By the time those ships had joined Keppel, night had fallen and, under cover of darkness, the French fleet sailed off. By daylight the French were 20 miles away and with no chance of catching them, Keppel decided to return to Plymouth to repair his ships.

== Aftermath ==
=== France ===
Louis Philippe II, Duke of Chartres, a French prince du sang who took part in the battle, requested permission to carry news of its outcome to Paris and the Palace of Versailles. He arrived at Versailles early on the morning of 2 August, had Louis XVI woken and announced a victory. Chartres was widely celebrated in France and received a twenty-minute standing ovation when he attended the Paris Opera; an effigy of Keppel was burnt in the gardens of Chartres' family residence, the Palais-Royal. Chartres then returned to Brest to rejoin the French fleet. Fresh reports of the battle and Chartres' role then began to arrive at Paris. Far from a victory, it was now reported as being at best indecisive, and Chartres was accused by d'Orvilliers of either misunderstanding or deliberately ignoring an order to engage the British fleet.

Chartres was soon mocked by street ballads in Paris, and the embarrassment led to his eventual resignation from the French navy. He subsequently tried to gain permission to take part in a planned invasion of Britain the following year, but he was refused by the King. The captains of Alexandre and Duc de Bourgogne, Trémigon and Rochechouart, were subject of an inquiry for their failure to take part in the battle after they got separated from the fleet in the night of 23 to 24 July. Rochechouart was also the commanding officer of the Second Division of the White-and-Blue squadron. Trémigon was admonished, and Rochechouart was cleared.

=== Britain ===
A violent quarrel, exacerbated by political differences, broke out between the British commands. This led to two courts-martial, the resignation of Keppel, and great injury to the discipline of the navy. Keppel was court-martialled but cleared of misconduct in action. Much was made of the alteration of log books and missing notes. Palliser was criticised by an inquiry before the affair turned into a squabble of party politics.

== Order of battle ==
=== British fleet ===
Admiral Keppel's fleet
Ship	Guns	Commander	Casualties			Notes
Ship	Guns	Commander	Killed	Wounded	Total	Notes
Van
Monarch	74	Captain Joshua Rowley				
Hector	74	Captain Sir John Hamilton				
Centaur	74	Captain Phillips Cosby				
Exeter	64	Captain John Neal Pleydell Nott				
Duke	90	Captain William Brereton				
Queen	90	Vice-Admiral Sir Robert Harland; Captain Isaac Prescott				Squadron flagship
Shrewsbury	74	Captain Sir John Lockhart Ross				
Cumberland	74	Captain Joseph Peyton				
Berwick	74	Captain Keith Stewart				
Stirling Castle	64	Captain Sir Charles Douglas				
Centre
Courageux	74	Captain Lord Mulgrave				
Thunderer	74	Captain Robert Boyle-Walsingham				
Sandwich	90	Captain Richard Edwards				
Valiant	74	Captain John Leveson-Gower				
Bienfaisant	64	Captain John MacBride				
Victory	100	Admiral Augustus Keppel; Rear-Admiral John Campbell (first captain); Captain Jonathan Faulknor (second captain)				Fleet flagship
Foudroyant	80	Captain John Jervis				
Prince George	90	Captain Sir John Lindsay				
Vigilant	64	Captain Robert Kingsmill				
Terrible	74	Captain Sir Richard Bickerton				
Vengeance	74	Captain Michael Clements				
Rear
Worcester	64	Captain Mark Robinson				
Elizabeth	74	Captain Frederick Lewis Maitland				
Robust	74	Captain Alexander Hood				
Formidable	90	Vice-Admiral of the Blue Sir Hugh Palliser; Captain John Bazely				Squadron flagship
Ocean	90	Captain John Laforey				
America	64	Captain Lord Longford				
Defiance	64	Captain Samuel Goodall				
Egmont	74	Captain John Carter Allen				
Ramillies	74	Captain Robert Digby				
Reconnaissance and signals
Arethusa	32	Captain Samuel Marshall				
Proserpine	28	Captain Evelyn Sutton				
Milford	28	Captain Sir William Burnaby				
Fox	28	Captain Thomas Windsor				
Andromeda	28	Captain Henry Bryne				
Lively	20	Captain Robert Biggs				
Pluto	8	Commander James Bradby				Fireship
Vulcan	8	Commander James Lloyd				Fireship
Alert	12	Commander William George Fairfax				
Casualties: 133 killed, 373 wounded, 506 total

=== French fleet ===
The French line of battle was in reversed order (the Régiment du Dauphin provided a detachment of marines during the battle).

Admiral Orvilliers' fleet
Division	Ship	Guns	Commander	Casualties			Notes
Division	Ship	Guns	Commander	Killed	Wounded	Total	Notes
Escadre bleue
Third Division	Diadème	74	Captain Jacques de Boutier de La Cardonnie				
Third Division	Conquérant	74	Chef d'Escadre François-Aymar de Monteil				Division flagship
Third Division	Solitaire	64	Captain Bon Chrétien de Briqueville				
First Division	Intrépide	74	Captain Louis-André Beaussier de Chateauvert				
First Division	Saint-Esprit	80	Lieutenant-General Louis Philippe II, Duke of Orléans; Captain Toussaint-Guillaume Picquet de la Motte; Captain Pierre de Roquefeuil-Montpeyroux				Division and Squadron flagship
First Division	Zodiaque	74	Captain Paul-Jules de la Porte-Vezins				
Second Division	Roland	64	Captain Jean-François Gilart de Larchantel				
Second Division	Robuste	74	Chef d'Escadre François Joseph Paul de Grasse				Division flagship
Second Division	Sphinx	64	Captain Claude-René Pâris de Soulanges				
Escadre blanche
Third Division	Artésien	64	Captain Charles René Dominique Sochet, Chevalier Destouches				
Third Division	Orient	74	Chef d'Escadre Charles Jean d'Hector				Division flagship
Third Division	Actionnaire	64	Captain Vincent-Joseph-Marie de Proisy de Brison				
First Division	Fendant	74	Captain Louis-Philippe de Rigaud, Marquis de Vaudreuil				
First Division	Bretagne	110	Lieutenant-General Louis Guillouet, comte d'Orvilliers; Captain Louis Guillaume de Parscau du Plessix				Division, Squadron and Fleet flagship
First Division	Magnifique	74	Captain François-Louis de Brach				
Second Division	Actif	74	Captain Thomas d'Estienne d'Orves				
Second Division	Ville de Paris	90	Chef d'Escadre Luc Urbain du Bouëxic, comte de Guichen; Captain Antoine de Thomassin de Peynier				Division flagship
Second Division	Réfléchi	64	Captain Armand-François Cillart de Suville				
Escadre blanche et bleue
Third Division	Vengeur	64	Captain Claude-François Renart d'Amblimont				
Third Division	Glorieux	74	Chef d'Escadre Antoine Hilarion de Beausset				Division flagship
Third Division	Indien	64	Captain Charles-Marie de La Grandière				
First Division	Palmier	74	Captain Henry-César Boscal de Réals				
First Division	Couronne	80	Lieutenant-General Louis Charles du Chaffault de Besné (WIA); Captain Jean-Michel Huon de Kermadec				Division and Squadron flagship. First officer Bessey de la Vouste killed.
First Division	Bien-Aimé	74	Captain Marcel-Ambroise d’Aubenton				
Second Division (Note: The Second Division of the White-and-Blue squadron was under Chef d'Escadre Étienne-Pierre de Rochechouart, with his flag on Duc de Bourgogne, who had detached from the fleet.)	Éveillé	64	Captain Nicholas-Hyacinthe de Botderu				
Second Division	Amphion	50	Captain Jean François Denis de Keredern de Trobriand				
Second Division	Dauphin Royal	70	Captain Armand-Claude Poute de Nieuil				
Reserve
Reserve	Triton	64	Captain Gaspard de Ligondès				
Reserve	Saint Michel	64	Captain Claude Mithon de Genouilly				
Reserve	Fier	50	Captain Jean-Baptiste Turpin du Breuil				
Reconnaissance and signals
Frigates	Junon	32					
Frigates	Sibylle	32					
Frigates	Fortunée	32					
Frigates	Résolue	32					
Frigates	Sensible	32					
Frigates	Nymphe	32					
Frigates	Danaé	32					
Corvettes and lighter units	Sylphide	12					
Corvettes and lighter units	Hirondelle	12					
Corvettes and lighter units	Lunette	4					
Corvettes and lighter units	Curieuse	10					
Corvettes and lighter units	Favorite	10					
Corvettes and lighter units	Espiègle	4 or 6					
Casualties: 163 killed, 517 wounded, 680 total

== Sources ==
- Ambrose, Tom (2008), Godfather of the Revolution: The Life of Phillipe Egalite, Duc D'Orleans, Peter Owen.
- Blandemore, Thomas, ed. (1779). The Trial of the Honourable Augustus Keppel, Admiral of the Blue Squadron At a Court Martial Held on Board His Majesty's Ship Britannia, in Portsmouth Harbour, on Thursday, January 8, 1779...With interesting Letters and Papers, and a Glossary of Technical terms and Sea Phrases. Portsmouth: J. Wilkes, Breadhower, and Peadle.
- Chack, Paul (2001). Marins à la Bataille (in French). Vol. 1. Paris: Le Gerfaut. ISBN 9782901196921. OCLC 552986998.
- Clowes, William Laird (1898). The Royal Navy, A History From the Earliest Times to the Present. Vol. 3. London: Sampson Low, Marston and Company.
- Lacour-Gayet, Georges (1905). La marine militaire de la France sous le règne de Louis XVI. Paris: Honoré Champion. OCLC 763372623.
- Mahan, Alfred Thayer (1913), The Major Operations of the Navies in the War of American Independence, London: Sampson Low, Marston & Co.
- Rodger, N. A. M. (2005). The Command of the Ocean. London: Penguin Books. ISBN 0-140-28896-1.
- Syrett, David (1998). The Royal Navy in European Waters During the American Revolutionary War. South Carolina: University of South Carolina Press. ISBN 9781570032387.
- Troude, Onésime-Joachim (1867). Batailles navales de la France (in French). Vol. 2. Challamel ainé. OCLC 836362484.
- Naval History Division (2019). Naval Documents of the American Revolution: American Theater: June 1, 1778 – August 15, 1778; European Theater: June 1, 1778 – August 15, 1778 (PDF). Vol. 13. United States.
