= French ship Zodiaque (1756) =

French 74-gun ship of the line launched in 1756

History

France
- Name: Zodiaque
- Namesake: Zodiac
- Builder: Brest
- Laid down: October 1755
- Launched: 18 November 1756
- In service: February 1757
- Fate: Sold in 1784

General characteristics
- Class & type: Diadème-class ship of the line
- Displacement: 2800 tonneaux
- Tons burthen: 1500 port tonneaux
- Length: 54.6 metres
- Beam: 14.1 metres
- Draught: 6.8 metres
- Propulsion: Sail
- Armament: 74 guns: 28 × 36-pounder long guns; 30 × 18-pounder long guns; 16 × 8-pounder long guns
- Armour: Timber

Zodiaque was a 74-gun Diadème-class ship of the line of the French Navy.

== Career ==
=== Seven Years' War ===
In 1757, Zodiaque was under d'Aché. on 5 June, she helped capture a British corvette.

She took part in the Battle of Pondicherry on 10 September 1759. In 1760, she was under La Tullaye at Isle de France.

=== Interwar ===
In 1776, Zodiaque was under Du Chaffault, as flagship of his division in the Escadre d'évolution that year.

=== War of American Independence ===
In 1778, Zodiaque was in the First Division of the White squadron in the fleet under Orvilliers. She took part in the Battle of Ushant on 27 July 1778 under La Porte Vézins, with Cicé-Champion as first officer. The year after, she was attached to the Armada of 1779.

In 1780, Zodiaque was under Roquefeuil-Montpeyroux. On 6 June, she and Néréide captured the 10-gun British privateer cutter Prince of Wales.

In 1781, Zodiaque was at Brest under Retz.

In 1782, Zodiaque was first under Senneville, and later under Langan-Boisfévrier, who captained her at the Battle of Cape Spartel on 20 October 1782.

== Fate ==
Zodiaque was sold in 1784.
