= Claude Mithon de Genouilly =

French Navy officer of the War of American Independence

Claude Mithon de Senneville de Genouilly
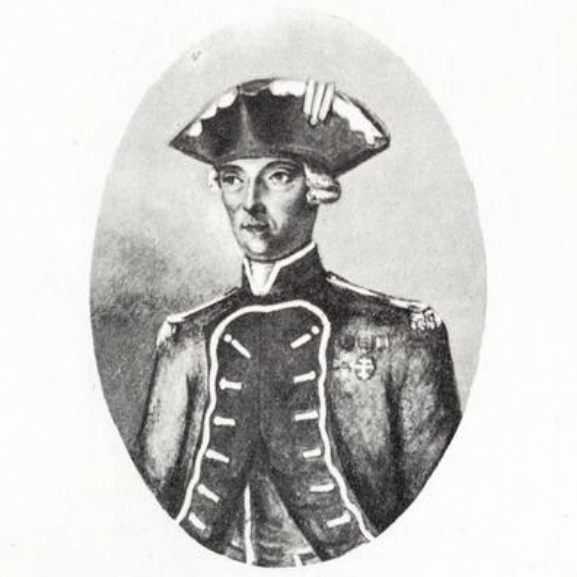
- Born: 6 October 1725; Saint-Domingue
- Died: 23 March 1803 (aged 77)
- Branch: French Navy
- Rank: Chef d'Escadre
- Conflicts: War of American Independence; Battle of Ushant; Battle of the Saintes

Claude Mithon de Senneville de Genouilly (6 October 1725 — 23 March 1803) was a French Navy officer. He served in the War of American Independence.

== Biography ==
Mithon de Genouilly was born in Saint-Domingue, in the family of the Intendant of Toulon. He joined the Navy as a Garde-Marine on 14 December 1743. He was promoted to Lieutenant on 15 May 1756.

He was promoted to Captain on 18 February 1772.

Genouilly captained the 60-gun Saint Michel at the Battle of Ushant on 27 July 1778.

In 1779, Mithon de Genouilly commanded the 70-gun Dauphin Royal, part of a division under De Grasse sent to reinforce the French squadron off America under Estaing.

In 1782, he commanded the 74-gun Magnifique, before transferring to Couronne. On Couronne, he took part in the Battle of the Saintes on 12 April 1782.

He was promoted to Chef d'Escadre on 20 August 1784.
