= French ship Palmier (1752) =

Ship of the line of the French Navy

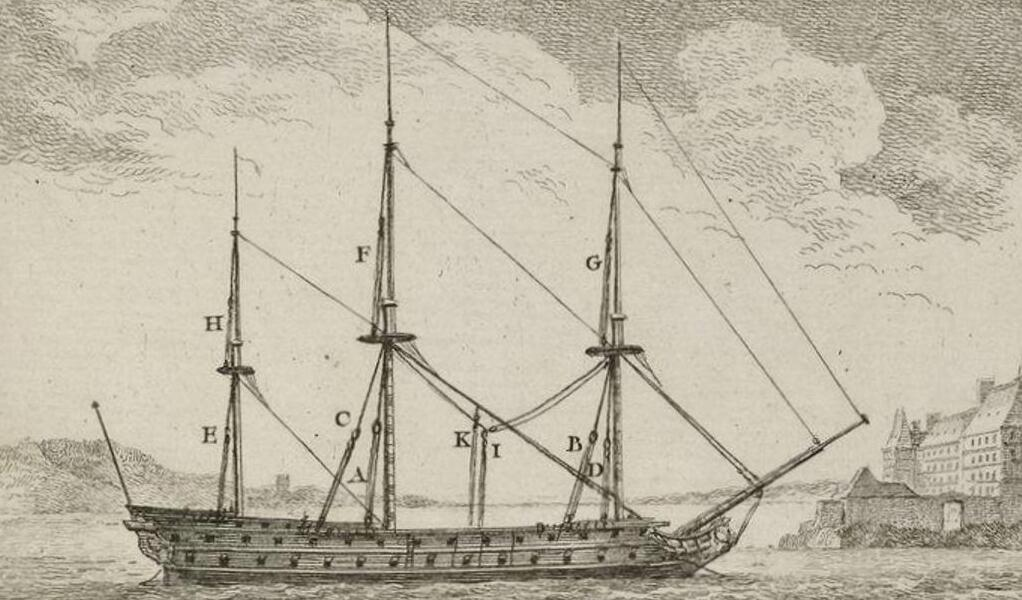
Engraving of a 74-gun French ship of the line similar to Palmier

Palmier was a 74-gun ship of the line of the French Navy launched in 1752 and lost in 1782.

== History ==
Built by Joseph Véronique-Charles Chapelle, her keel was laid down at Brest on 14 November 1750 as part of the shipbuilding boom between the end of the War of the Austrian Succession in 1748 and the start of the Seven Years' War in 1755. She was built to the norms set for ships of the line by French shipbuilders in the 1740s to try to match the cost, armament and maneuverability of their British counterparts, since the Royal Navy had had a greater number of ships than the French since the end of the wars of Louis XIV.

She was launched on 21 July 1752 and completed in October of the same year. She was commanded by Joseph de Bauffremont during the Canadian campaign by Rémy-Claude de Bullion's fleet in May 1755 at the start of the Seven Years' War. She did not fight at the battles of Lagos or Quiberon Bay, in which the Toulon and Brest fleets were defeated in a new attempt at an invasion of Britain. In June 1766 it was ordered that she should be rebuilt at Brest because her timbers were so rotten that it was not possible to save any for a refit. Taken in hand at Brest Dockyard, she was re-launched in December 1766 and emerged, essentially as a new ship to the lines of Citoyen, a new 74-gun designed by Joseph-Louis Ollivier.

In 1778 Palmier was under Henry-César Boscal de Réals as part of the White-and-Blue squadron, the vanguard of the fleet under Louis Guillouet, comte d'Orvilliers. She took part in the Battle of Ushant on 27 July 1778. In 1780 she was sent to the Antilles as part of Luc Urbain du Bouëxic, comte de Guichen's fleet. There she fought in the Battle of Martinique on 16 April and in two other indecisive encounters against George Rodney's fleet. In May 1781 she served as François-Aymar de Monteil's flagship in the Franco-Spanish attack on Pensacola in Florida. The Palmier then joined François Joseph Paul de Grasse's fleet, which had just arrived from France, and returned with it to the Antilles.

On 12 September 1781 she fought Battle of Chesapeake, a decisive French victory which lead to the British defeat at the siege of Yorktown. Still stationed in the Antilles, she took part in the Battle of St Kitts in January 1782. On 12 April she was part of the rearguard at the decisive French defeat in the Battle of the Saintes. She was retired from the fleet the same year when it was ordered back to France, but was sunk by a major storm off the Bermudas on 24 October 1782.
