= Daubenton (disambiguation) =

Daubenton may refer to:

- Edme-Louis Daubenton (1730–1785), French naturalist
- Louis-Jean-Marie Daubenton (1716–1799), French naturalist
  - Censier–Daubenton station, a Paris Metro station named in honour of Louis-Jean-Marie Daubenton
  - Daubenton's bat (Myotis daubentonii), Eurasian bat, named in honour of Louis-Jean-Marie Daubenton
  - Daubenton's free-tailed bat (Myopterus daubentonii), African bat, named in honour of Louis-Jean-Marie Daubenton
- Marcel-Ambroise d’Aubenton (1742—1782), French Navy officer of the War of American Independence
