= Jacques de Boutier de La Cardonnie =

French military personnel (1727-1791)

- Born: September 5, 1727; Villeneuve-sur-Lot
- Died: November, 1791 (aged 63–64) Jérémie
- Allegiance: France
- Branch: Navy
- Rank: Captain
- Commands: Bergère
- Conflicts: American Revolutionary War

Jacques de Boutier de la Cardonnie was a French Navy officer. He was born on September 5, 1727 in Villeneuve-sur-Lot and died in November 1791. He notably served during the American Revolutionary War.

== Biography ==
La Cardonnie joined the Navy as a volunteer in 1744, and became a Garde-Marine in 1746. He served on Alcyon in the Caribbean and in Canada, and was promoted to Ensign on 17 May 1751.

In 1753, he was accepted as a member of the Académie de Marine. He was promoted to Lieutenant on 17 April 1757, and to Captain in February 1772.

In 1767, La Cardonnie was captain of Bergère. He surveyed the coast of Saint-Domingue. In 1769, he sailed Bergère to Havana, Rochefort, Bordeaux and Saint-Domingue.

La Cardonnie captained the 74-gun Diadème at the Battle of Ushant on 27 July 1778. She was nominally in the rear-guard of the French fleet, but since the Orvilliers' line was in reverse order, her position at the lead ship of the Third Division of the Blue Squadron made her the first ship of the battle line. After the battle, he was subject of an inquiry for his failure to engage the British. He wrote a memorandum in his defence, but was relieved of command.

In 1779, La Cardonnie had a duel in Paris with his former first officer, Schantz. Schantz was exiled to Sweden as punishment.

In 1780, La Cardonnie captained the 74-gun Actif and cruised off Cadiz and Saint-Vincent. He captured the British Hercule, Wright, master, off Saint-Vincent. La Cardonnie proposed to use Actif for commerce raiding in addition to her usual duties of convoy escort.

== Sources and references ==
Notes

Citations

References

- Chack, Paul (2001). Marins à bataille (in French). Vol. 1. Paris: Le Gerfaut. ISBN 9782901196921. OCLC 552986998.
- Lacour-Gayet, Georges (1905). La marine militaire de la France sous le règne de Louis XVI. Paris: Honoré Champion. OCLC 763372623.
- Taillemite, Étienne (1982). Dictionnaire des Marins français. Paris: Éditions maritimes et d'Outre-Mer. ISBN 9782707000316. OCLC 239744936.
- Troude, Onésime-Joachim (1867). Batailles navales de la France (in French). Vol. 2. Challamel ainé. OCLC 836362484.

External links

- Archives nationales (2011). "Fonds Marine, sous-série B/4: Campagnes, 1571-1785" (PDF).
- Rouxel, Jean-Christophe (2020). "Jacques de BOUTIER de La CARDONNIE".
