= French ship Fier (1745) =

Ship of the line of the French Navy

History

France
- Name: Fier
- Ordered: "Proud"
- Builder: Toulon
- Laid down: April 1745
- Launched: 1 December 1745
- Decommissioned: May 1782
- In service: May 1746
- Fate: Sold 1782

General characteristics
- Displacement: 1750 tonneaux
- Tons burthen: 880 port tonneaux
- Length: 46.5 metres
- Beam: 12.5 metres
- Depth of hold: 6.4 metres
- Propulsion: Sails
- Sail plan: Full-rigged ship
- Armament: 60 guns, later 50

Fier was a 50-gun ship of the line of the French Navy, launched in 1745. Designed by engineer Chapelle, she was one of the last 60-gun ships built before the advent of the more modern and standard 64-guns. She was reduced to a 50-gun and served into the 1780, taking part in the War of American Independence. She was sold in 1782 to be used as a merchantman.

== Career ==
On 22 July 1746, Fier and Flore captured the privateer Pearl. She took part in the Battle of Minorca on 20 May 1756 under Captain d'Erville. In 1670, she was under Captain Marquisan.

In 1762, she was under Pierre de Moriès-Castellet.

In 1772 she was under Captain Du Chaffault in the squadron under Orvilliers. She took part in the Battle of Ushant on 27 July 1778 under Turpin du Breuil.

== Fate ==
Fier was sold in 1782 to be used as a merchantman.
