= French ship Éveillé (1772) =

Ship of the line of the French Navy

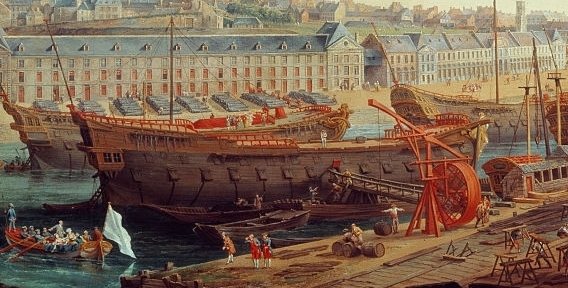
- Éveillé under construction at Brest, 1774

History

France
- Name: Éveillé
- Builder: Brest
- Laid down: February 1771
- Launched: 10 December 1772
- Commissioned: August 1777
- Decommissioned: 1787
- Fate: Struck 1787

General characteristics
- Class & type: Artésien-class ship of the line
- Displacement: 2084 tonneaux
- Tons burthen: 1200 port tonneaux
- Length: 50.2 metres
- Beam: 13.2 metres
- Depth of hold: 6.4 metres
- Propulsion: Sails
- Sail plan: Full-rigged ship
- Armament: 26 × 24-pounder long guns; 28 × 12-pounder long guns; 10 × 6-pounder long guns

Éveillé was an Artésien-class 64-gun ship of the line of the French Navy, launched in 1772.

== Career ==
Éveillé was commissioned under Captain du Maitz de Goimpy in 1777.

In 1778, she was under Botderu, with Lieutenant de Gouzillon as first officer, and was part of the White-and-blue squadron under Du Chaffault in the fleet under Orvilliers. She took part in the Battle of Ushant on 27 July 1778.

In 1779, she was under La Cour de Balleroy. In February 1780, Éveillé was briefly under the command of Denis de Trobriand, but he died on the 18th of that same month.

On 2 May 1780, she departed Brest with the 7-ship and 3-frigate Expédition Particulière under Admiral Ternay, escorting 36 transports carrying troops to support the Continental Army in the War of American Independence. The squadron comprised the 80-gun Duc de Bourgogne, under Ternay d'Arsac (admiral) and Médine (flag captain); the 74-gun Neptune, under Sochet Des Touches, and Conquérant, under La Grandière; and the 64-gun Provence under Lombard, Ardent under Bernard de Marigny, Jason under La Clocheterie and Éveillé under Le Gardeur de Tilly, and the frigates Surveillante under Villeneuve Cillart, Amazone under La Pérouse, and Bellone. Amazone, which constituted the vanguard of the fleet, arrived at Boston on 11 June 1780.

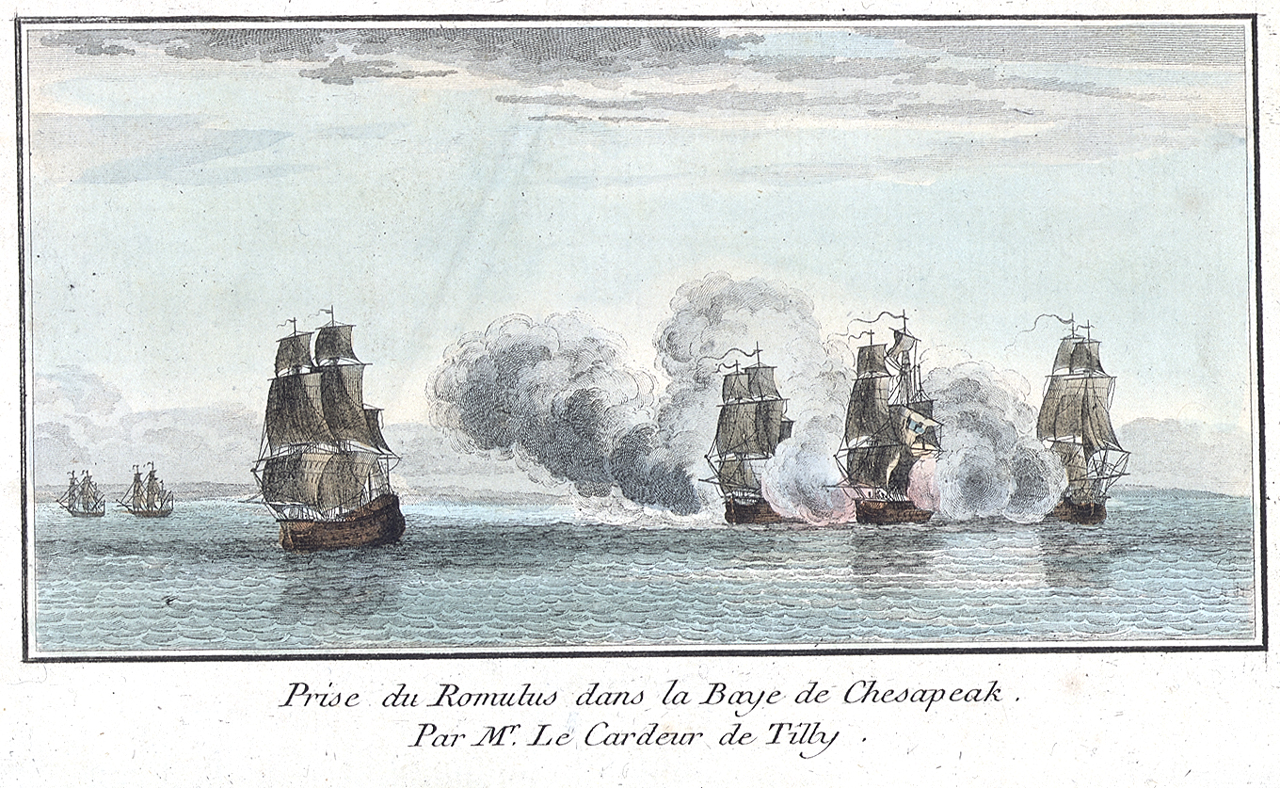
Taking of the Romulus in Chesapeake Bay by Eveille, Gentille and Surveillante from a sketch by the captain of the Éveillé, Mr. Le Gardeur de Tilly

On 2 May 1780, in the midst of the Anglo-French War, Éveillé departed Brest under Captain Le Gardeur de Tilly, bound for America. In January 1781, in Chesapeake Bay, she captured the 44-gun HMS Romulus and 4 transports she was escorting.

She took part in the Battle of the Saintes on 12 April 1782.

== Fate ==
Éveillé was condemned at Rochefort in 1786, and struck from the Navy lists in 1787.
