= French frigate Renommée (1767) =

History

France
- Name: Renommée
- Ordered: 1770
- Builder: Brest
- Laid down: September 1767
- Launched: 22 August 1767
- In service: December 1767
- Out of service: 1784
- Fate: Broken up in Brest in 1784

General characteristics
- Class & type: 40-gun frigate
- Displacement: 1170 tonneaux
- Tons burthen: 600 port tonneaux
- Length: 47.1 metres
- Beam: 15.7 metres
- Depth of hold: 5.0 metres
- Sail plan: Full-rigged ship
- Armament: Upper deck: 30 × 12-pounders; Lighter guns on castles

Renommée was a 40-gun frigate of the French Navy.

== Career ==
Renommée entered service in 1767. In 1775, she underwent a refit.

In 1776, Renommée was commanded by Monteil, and part of the Escadre d'évolution under Du Chaffault. On 20 April 1776, she touched a reef while departing Brest. Du Chaffault defended Monteil, writing to the Navy Minister that "only those who command ships run the risk of losing them". (Note: Il n'y a que ceux qui commandent les vaisseaux qui soient dans le cas de les perdre) Renommée was refloated a few days after, sent to a dry dock for repairs, and returned to service in June.

Renommée was broken up in 1784.
