= Escadre d'évolution =

An Escadre d'évolution (French, literally "Evolution squadron") is a squadron of warships of the French Navy cruising in peacetime for the purpose of training their crew and student officers.

== History ==
The French Navy started organizing Escadre d'évolution early in its existence. During the 17th century, Tourville conducted such exercises.

The practice fell in disuse due to an era of wars and lack of credits. During the reign of Louis XVI, the Navy restored the practice under Duchaffault and Orvilliers. In 1772, Orvilliers was cruising off the shores of France for several weeks, with his flag on the 64-gun Alexandre. Duchaffault captained the 50-gun Fier, and the frigate Aurore was also part of the squadron. Minister Sartine then instituted such cruises as yearly events.

In 1775, Guichen was conducting his own exercises from Brest with a 12-ship division comprising four frigates, five corvettes, a lugger and two cutters, and 1885 men, with his flag on the 36-gun frigate Terpsichore. On 8 September 1775, Guichen's training squadron appeared on the horizon and was in port a mere two hours later; the event shook Sartine, who remarked that the defences of Brest could never be manned in such a short time, and thus had to be reinforced and maintained at a constant state of readiness, even in peacetime.

In 1776, Sartine increased the strength of the Escadre d'évolution to 17 ships, including three ships of the line, seven frigates, five corvettes and two cutters. It was organising in three divisions, each under a Chef d'Escadre with his flag on a ship of the line: Du Chaffault, holding exercises from Brest with his flag on the 74-gun Zodiaque; Abon, on the 64-gun Provence; and Chartres, on the 64-gun Solitaire. From 10 May, the squadron conducted a four-month cruise between Ushant and Cape Finisterre, and with 3,705 men — fewer than in wartime, but noticeably more than the normal peacetime complement. The frigate Diligente, under Lieutenant Amblimont, took part in the exercises.

Training at sea resumed after the War of American Independence and the related Anglo-French War that ended in 1783. Notably, when Louis XVI visited Cherbourg naval base in April 1786 to mark the completion of a sea wall, the Escadre d'évolution held a naval review and naumachia under Chef d'Escadre Albert de Rions, with his flag on the 74-gun Patriote.

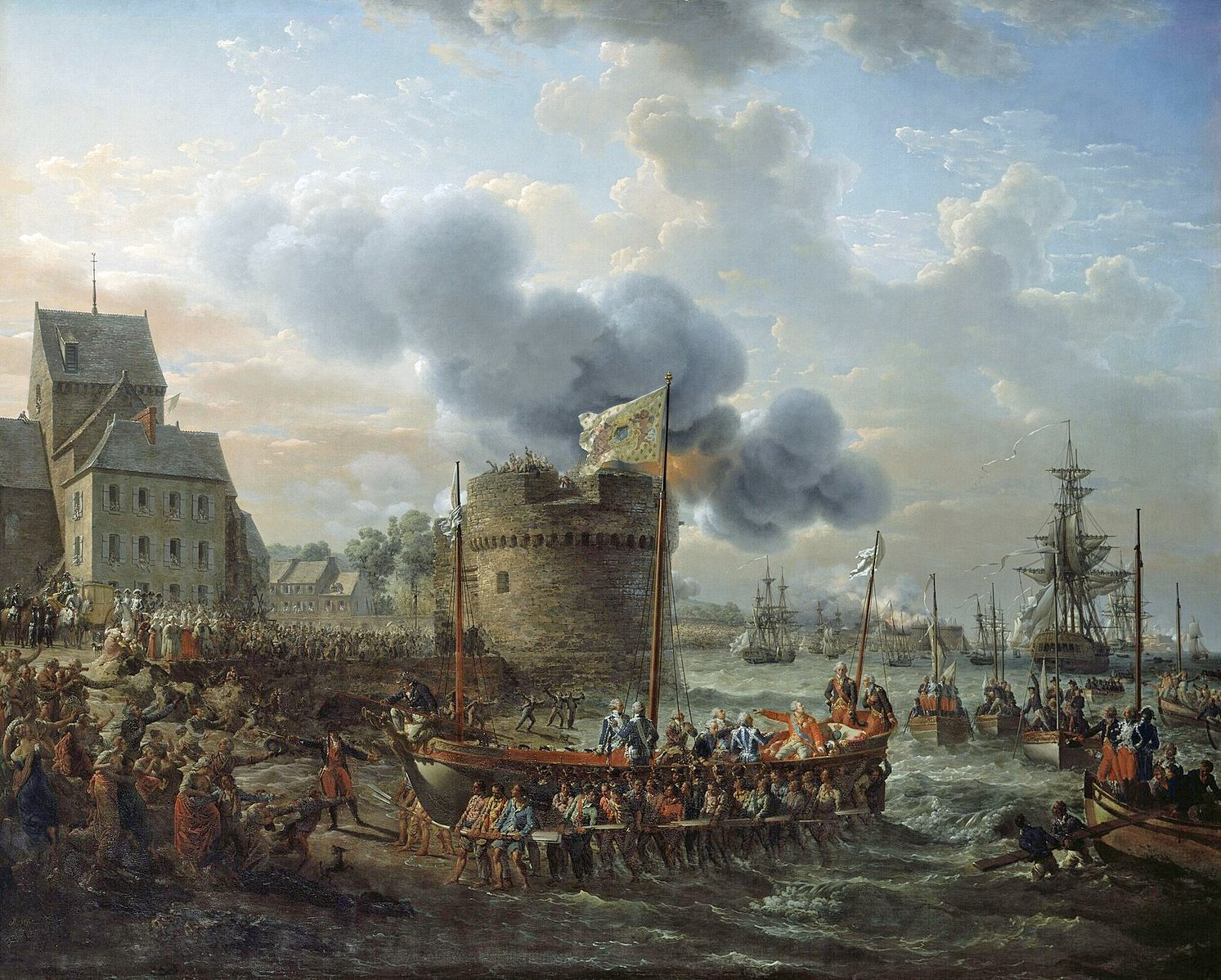
Louis XVI visiting Cherbourg in 1786, by Louis-Philippe Crépin

The French Revolutionary Wars and Napoleonic Wars removed the opportunity to conduct training cruises for a whole era again. In the 1840s, the practice was reintroduced under the impulsion of such officers as Lalande.

== See also ==
- The United States Navy had a Squadron of Evolution in the late 19th century.
- The Brazilian Navy also had an Evolution Squadron in the late 19th century.
