= Marcel-Ambroise d'Aubenton =

French Navy officer

- Born: 1742
- Died: May 26, 1782 (aged 39–40); Rochefort
- Spouse: Marie Marthe Claire Lory
- Military career
- Allegiance: France
- Branch: Navy
- Rank: Brigadier des Armées navales
- Commands: Bien-Aimé
- Conflicts: War of American Independence
- Awards: Knight in the Order of Saint Louis

Marcel-Ambroise d'Aubenton (Note: Also written "Daubenton") (1742 — Rochefort, 26 May 1782) was a French Navy officer. He is notable for his service during the War of American Independence.

== Biography ==
Aubenton was made a Knight in the Order of Saint Louis on 18 January 1762. He married Marie Marthe Claire Lory, with whom he had several daughters.

In 1778, Aubenton captained the 74-gun Bien-Aimé, part of the White-and-blue squadron under Du Chaffault in the fleet under Orvilliers. He took part in the Battle of Ushant on 27 July 1778.

He retired from the Navy with the rank of Brigadier des Armées navales, and as director of artillery in Rochefort.
