= Paul-Jules de la Porte-Vezins =

French aristocrat and naval officer

Paul-Jules de la Porte-Vezins, known as the "Marquis de la Porte-Vezins" (born 3 December 1727, Parthenay; date of death unknown) was a French naval officer and aristocrat. He fought in the War of the Austrian Succession, the Seven Years' War and the American Revolutionary War, ending his career at the rank of chef d'escadre (1784) and as director general and second-in-command of Brest.

== Sources ==
- Alexandre Mazas, Histoire de l'ordre royal et Militaire de Saint-Louis depuis son institution en 1693 jusqu'en 1830, vol. 2, Paris, Firmin Didot frères, fils et Cie, 1860, p. 187
