= Bombardment of Tripoli (1728) =

Military operation by Kingdom of France

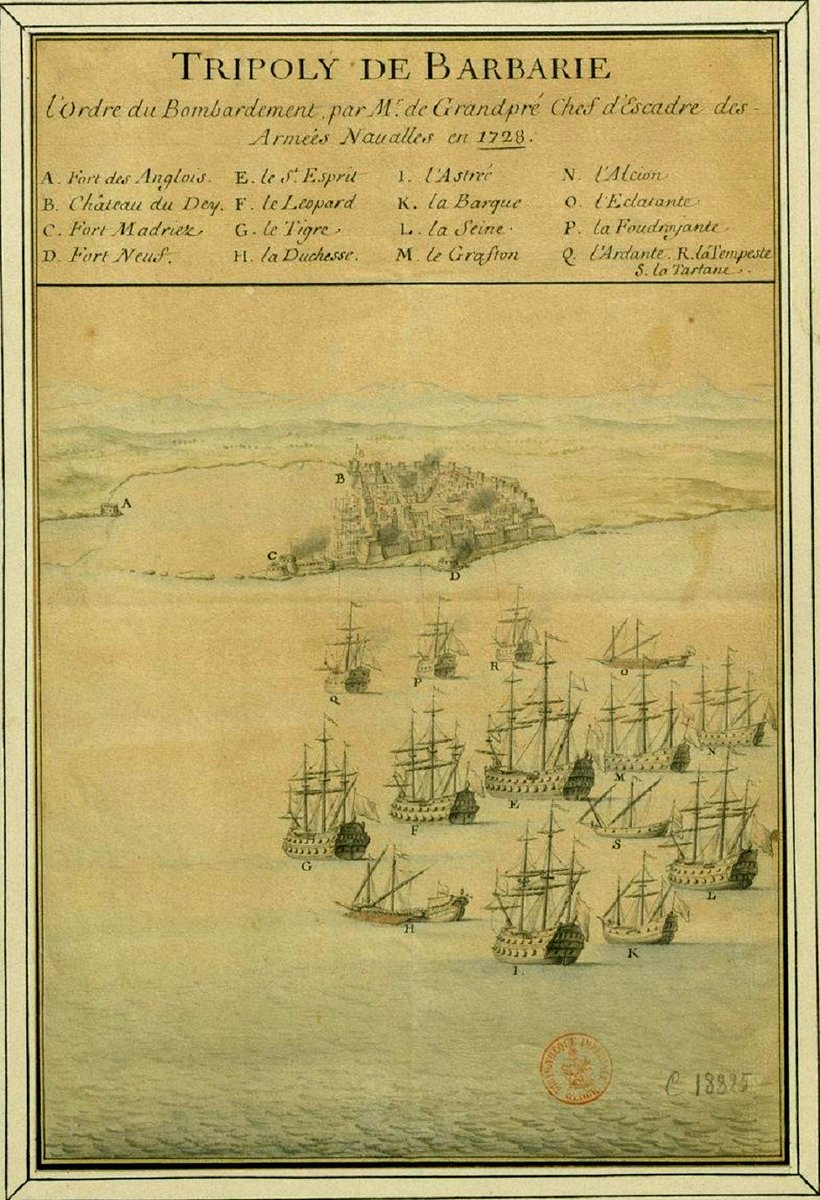
- The bombardment of Tripoli in 1728 by the French squadron of Grandpré.
Date	July 20–27, 1728
Location	Tripoli, Ottoman Tripolitania
Result	Inconclusive

Belligerents
France	Tripolitania

Commanders and leaders
Étienne Nicolas de Grandpré	Ahmed Karamanli

Strength
Unknown	Unknown

Casualties and losses
Unknown	Unknown

The Bombardment of Tripoli is a military operation of the Kingdom of France which took place between July 20 and July 27, 1728 against the current city of Tripoli, in Libya.

After appearing before Tunis which immediately submitted, a French fleet commanded by the squad leader Étienne Nicolas de Grandpré presents himself in front of Tripoli of Barbary Coast. Faced with the Pasha's refusal to submit in turn, the French fleet bombarded the city for six nights, causing great destruction. However, this French victory was not exploited due to the lack of troops landing on land.

== Background ==
In 1685, an expedition had already taken place against Tunis and Tripoli; its object was then to force these two cities to respect the commitments concluded with the King by making them feel the superiority of the French forces.

After the peace treaties they had concluded with Austria, the Barbary Pirate of Tripoli and Tunis left the Italian commercial vessels in relative tranquility and turned towards French ships, in contravention of the terms of the treaty of 1720. In 1725 and 1727, French squadrons made two naval demonstrations, but the Tripolitan pasha was known for not keeping his word. It was the same with Tunis.

Reynaud, a French naval officer, who had been captive in Tunis and had been assigned to the service of the Bey of Tunis, managed to escape and return to France . Learning that the government was preparing to act, he sent from Toulon on September 23, 1727, a plan to bombard the Tunisian ports: Bizerte, Porto Farina, Sousse and Sfax.

The Jean Frédéric Phélypeaux de Maurepas, Secretary of State of the Navy orders the arming of a new squadron of which he entrusts command to the squad commander, Étienne Nicolas de Grandpré.

== The Bombardment ==
During negotiations with Ahmed Karamanli, the bey in office, via the French consul, no agreement was found. Mr. de Grandpré offered to send one of his officers ashore in exchange for holding the bey's son hostage, but this offer was rejected. The bey responded arrogantly, saying that they were not afraid of bombs and had no money to give, and were ready for war.

Despite this, Mr. de Grandpré was reluctant to use force, but military movements intensified on land, on the ramparts and in the forts, and the city prepared for combat. With the encouragement of his officers and favorable conditions, Mr. de Grandpré finally decided to bombard the city. For a week, bombs fired into the city every night, causing significant damage.

However, bomb reserves were running low, ships had no troops to disembark, and wind became problematic off a rocky coast. The squadron therefore had to return to France with the haughty response of the corsairs, leaving Tripoli almost destroyed but its inhabitants undefeated.
