= French ship Dauphin Royal (1738) =

Ship of the line of the French Navy

History

France
- Name: Dauphin Royal
- Namesake: The Dauphin of France, heir to the French throne
- Builder: Brest Dockyard
- Laid down: November 1735
- Launched: 13 October 1738
- In service: October 1740
- Out of service: September 1783
- Stricken: 1783
- Fate: Broken up in 1787

General characteristics
- Class & type: ship of the line
- Displacement: 2608 tonneaux
- Tons burthen: 1400 port tonneaux
- Length: 49.9 metres; 155 French feet 10 inches
- Beam: 13.6 metres; 42 French feet 4 inches
- Draught: 6.6 metres; 20 French feet 4 inches
- Depth of hold: 20½ French feet
- Decks: 2 gun decks
- Sail plan: Full-rigged ship
- Complement: 550 men; 6 officers
- Armament: 74 guns: Main battery: 26 × 36-pounders on the lower deck; Secondary battery: 28 × 18-pounders on the upper deck; Forecastle and quarterdeck: 16 × 8-pounders on the quarterdeck and forecastle; Poop 4 × 4-pounders on the poop (these were removed in 1751)
- Armour: timber

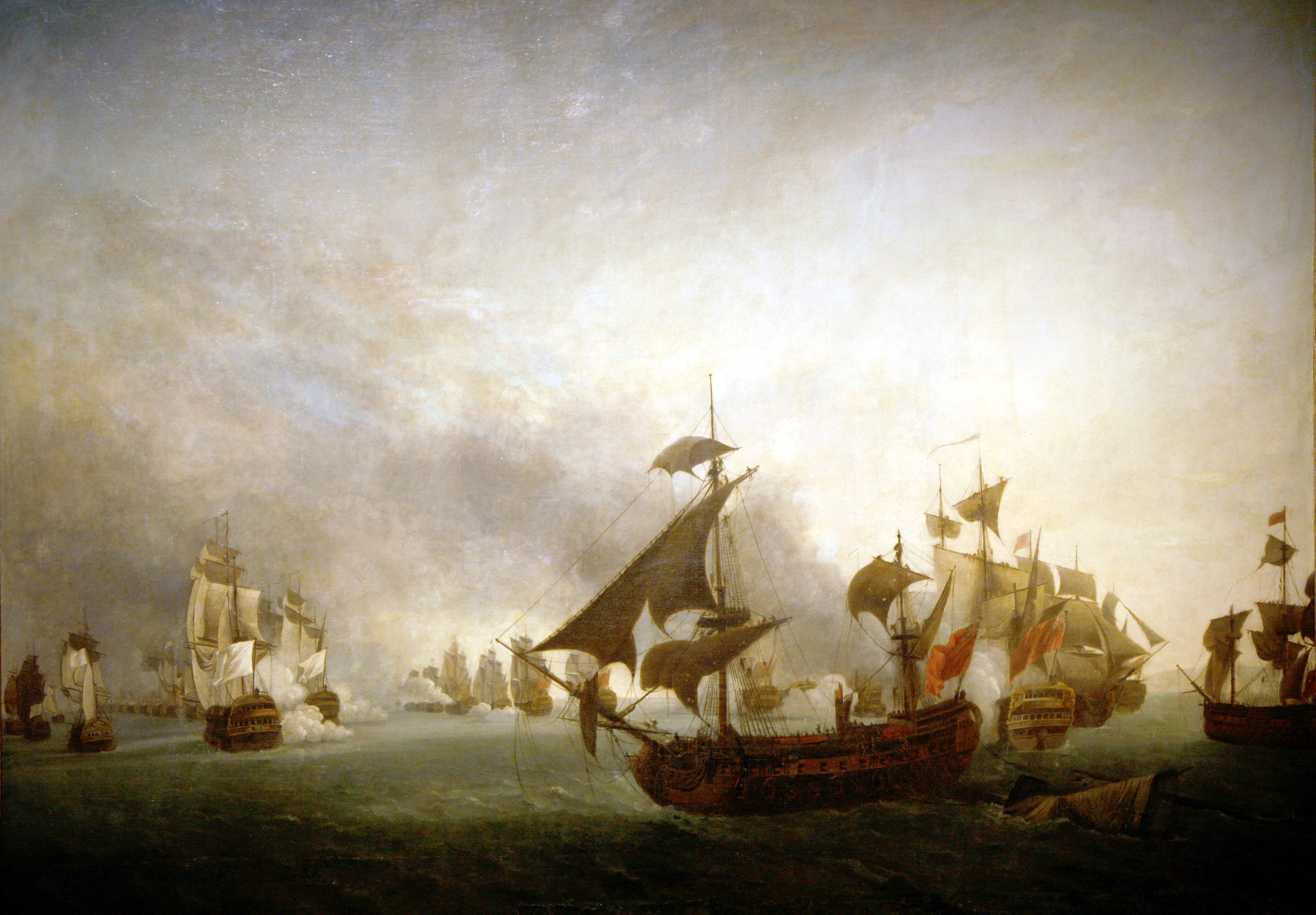
Battle of Grenada

Dauphin Royal was a 74-gun ship of the line of the Royal French Royal Navy, designed in 1735 by Blaise Ollivier and constructed in 1735 to 1740 at Brest Dockyard.

== Construction ==
Dauphin Royal and the contemporary Superbe, also built at Brest over the same period, were the last French 74-gun ships to have only thirteen pairs of lower deck guns (subsequent 74-gun French ships all were constructed with a fourteenth pair of lower deck guns). In 1747, she was rebuilt at Brest and reduced to 70 guns by the removal of her poop guns.

== Career ==
In early 1744, Dauphin Royal was part of the squadron under Roquefeuil for a cruise in the Channel.

In 1755, she sailed to Canada under Captain de Montalais. In 1757, she was laid up in ordinary at Rochefort.

Dauphin Royal took part in the Battle of Quiberon Bay on 20 November 1759 under Captain d'Uturbie Fragosse.

In 1788, under Nieuil, Dauphin Royal was the lead ship of the Second Division in the White-and-Blue squadron of the fleet under Orvilliers. She took part in the Battle of Ushant, the Invasion of Minorca in 1781, and the Battle of Saint Kitts on 25/26 January 1782. Dauphin Royal and her commander Roquefeuil-Montpeyroux also took part in the Battle of the Saintes on 12 April 1782.

== Fate ==
She was condemned in September 1783 and sold in June 1787 to be broken up.
