= Montpeyroux, Aveyron =

Commune in Occitanie, France

Montpeyroux
- Commune
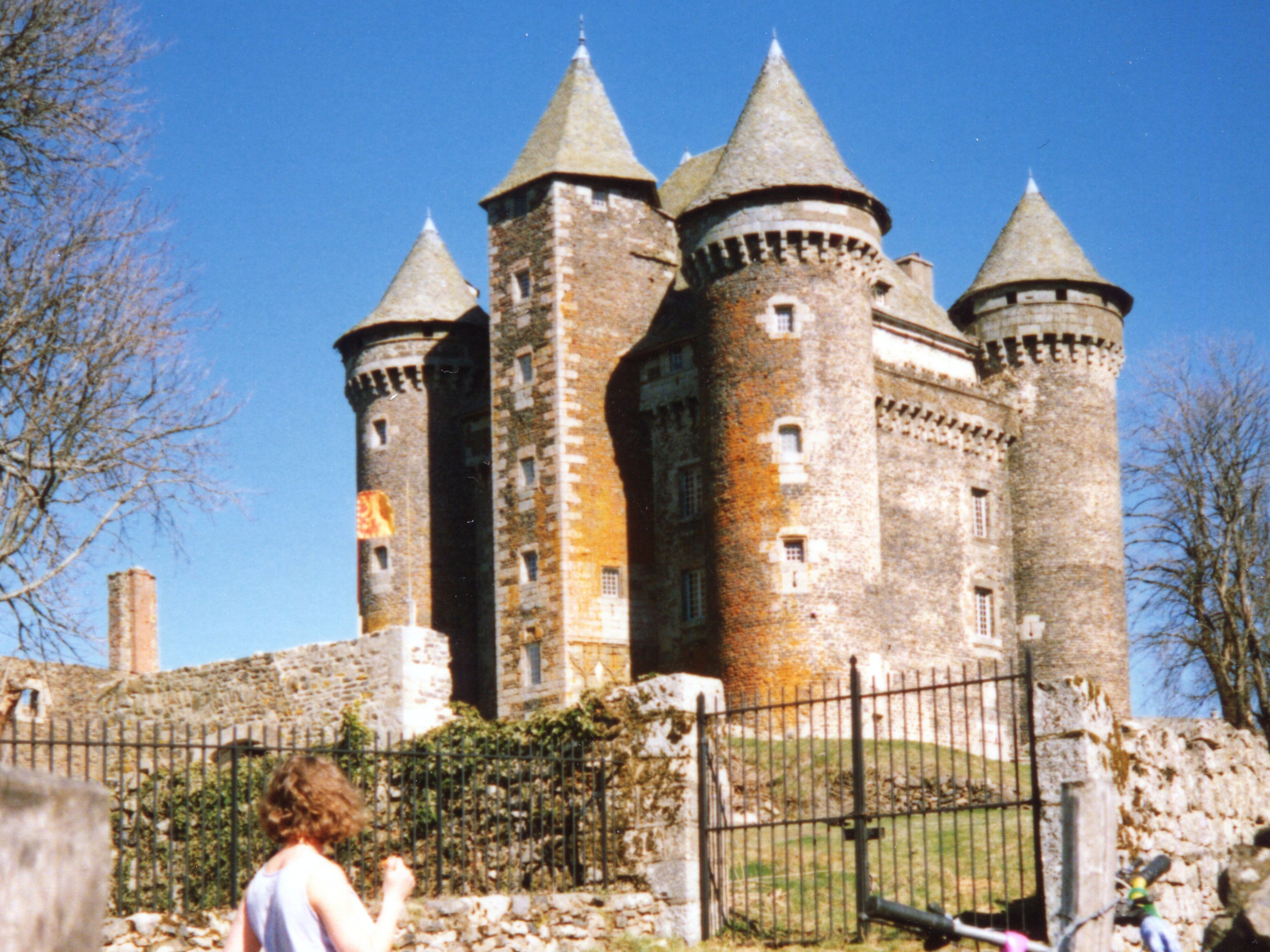
- The Château du Bousquet

- Coat of arms
- Location of Montpeyroux
- Location within France Location within Occitanie
- Coordinates: 44°38′33″N 2°49′32″E
- Country: France
- Region: Occitania
- Department: Aveyron
- Arrondissement: Rodez
- Canton: Aubrac et Carladez

Government
  - Mayor (2020–2026): Benoît Revel
- Area^{1}: 61.71 km^{2} (23.83 sq mi)
- Elevation: 967 m (3,173 ft)
- Highest elevation: 1,023 m (3,356 ft)
- Lowest elevation: 510 m (1,670 ft)
- Population (2023): 518
  - Density: 8.39/km^{2} (21.7/sq mi)
- Time zone: UTC+01:00 (CET)
  - Summer (DST): UTC+02:00 (CEST)
- INSEE/Postal code: 12156 /12210
- ^{1} French Land Register data, which excludes lakes, ponds, glaciers > 1 km^{2} (0.386 sq mi or 247 acres) and river estuaries.

Montpeyroux (French pronunciation: [mɔ̃peʁu]; Occitan: Montpeirós) is a commune in the Aveyron department in southern France. Residents of the commune are referred to as Montpeirosiens.

In 1790–1794, the commune absorbed Seignour Delcros, Engalenc and Esparou; in 1832, it absorbed Le Bousquet, Brionnès and Crozillac.

== Population ==
Historical population
Year	Pop.	±% p.a.
1968	787	—
1975	670	−2.27%
1982	610	−1.33%
1990	578	−0.67%
1999	550	−0.55%
2007	566	+0.36%
2012	550	−0.57%
2017	541	−0.33%
2023	518	−0.72%
Source: INSEE

== See also ==
- Communes of the Aveyron department
