= Château du Bousquet (Aveyron) =

Castle in Le Bousquet, France

Coordinates: 44.6567°N 2.807635°E

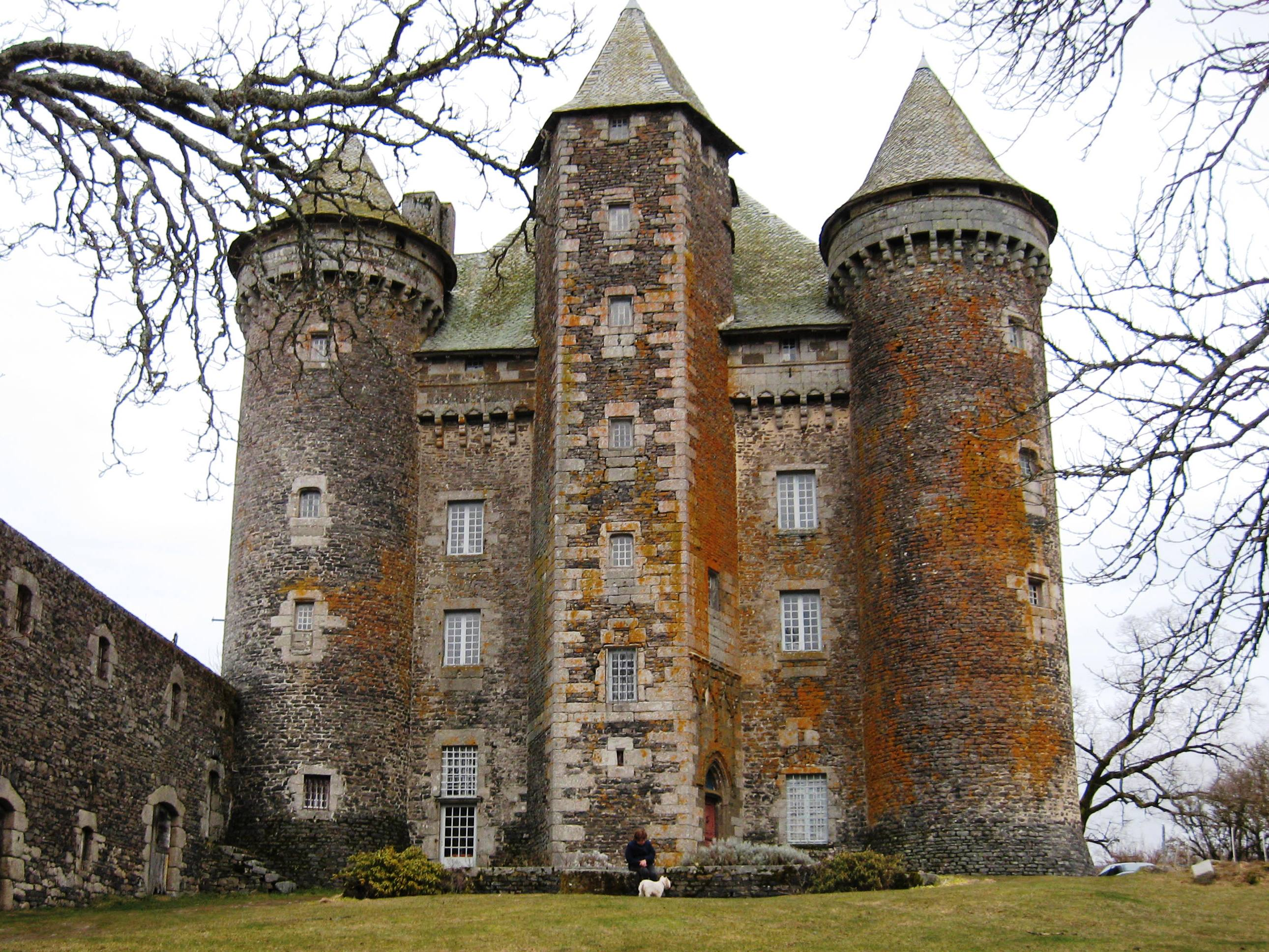

The Château du Bousquet is a castle in the village of Le Bousquet, part of the commune of Montpeyroux in the Aveyron département of France. The castle is privately owned, but open to the public after 14:30 except on Tuesdays.

== Description ==
The castle, which belonged for four centuries to the Roquefeuil-Blanquefort family, comprises six towers (two hexagonal in the middle of the two front and rear facades, four rounds at each corner). The central tower of the south facade, which contains the staircase is pierced on the ground floor of a radiating Gothic door. The typically feudal and defensive character of the castle is somewhat mitigated by the existence of later windows on the three floors. The defensive system which surrounded it (enclosure, ditch, fortifications) disappeared, replaced by two wings in the 17th century. Inside, the ground floor has kept its kitchen intact, with the mesh stage where the musicians were based. The chapel retains a decoration painted by Debert in 1709.

== See also ==
- List of castles in France
- House of Roquefeuil-Blanquefort
