= Armada of 1779 =

Franco-Spanish naval enterprise against Britain

- Part of the American Revolutionary War
Date	June to September 1779
Location	English Channel
Result	British victory

Belligerents
France; Spain	Great Britain

Commanders and leaders
(Kingdom of France) Comte d'Orvilliers (Kingdom of France) Comte de Vaux (Spain) Luis de Córdova y Córdova	(Kingdom of Great Britain) Sir Charles Hardy (Kingdom of Great Britain) Lord Amherst

Strength
66 ships of the line 30,000 troops	38 ships of the line 20,000 troops 39,000 militia

Casualties and losses
8,000 dead or sick from disease	1 ship captured

The Armada of 1779 was a combined Franco-Spanish naval enterprise intended to divert British military assets, primarily of the Royal Navy, from other war theatres by invading the Kingdom of Great Britain during the American Revolutionary War. This action was a part of the wider Anglo-French War (1778–1783). The proposed plan was to seize the Isle of Wight and then capture the British naval base of Portsmouth. Ultimately, no fleet battles were fought in the Channel and the Franco-Spanish invasion never materialized. This threat to Great Britain prompted comparisons to the earlier Spanish Armada of 1588.

== Background ==
After the indecisive Battle of Ushant in 1778 between the British Royal Navy and the French Marine Royale, the French were certain that they could have triumphed if their force had been larger. France had allied itself with the Americans in February 1778 and additionally signed a secret treaty with Spain on 12 April 1779, which brought Spain into the war against Great Britain. Fearful of the consequences to their land claims in America, the Spanish did not openly support the American colonists' rebellion against British rule, but were willing to undertake direct operations against British interests elsewhere. Spain thus sought to regain various European territories controlled by Britain, most notably the fortress of Gibraltar, the possession of which effectively controlled access to trade in and out of the Mediterranean Sea. On 3 June 1779, in an attempt to achieve a strategic advantage by misleading the British, the French fleet at Brest left port hastily and sailed southward, deliberately under-provisioned in order to avoid Royal Navy scrutiny and a subsequent blockade. Then, on 16 June, Spain officially declared war on Great Britain.

== Armada Campaign ==
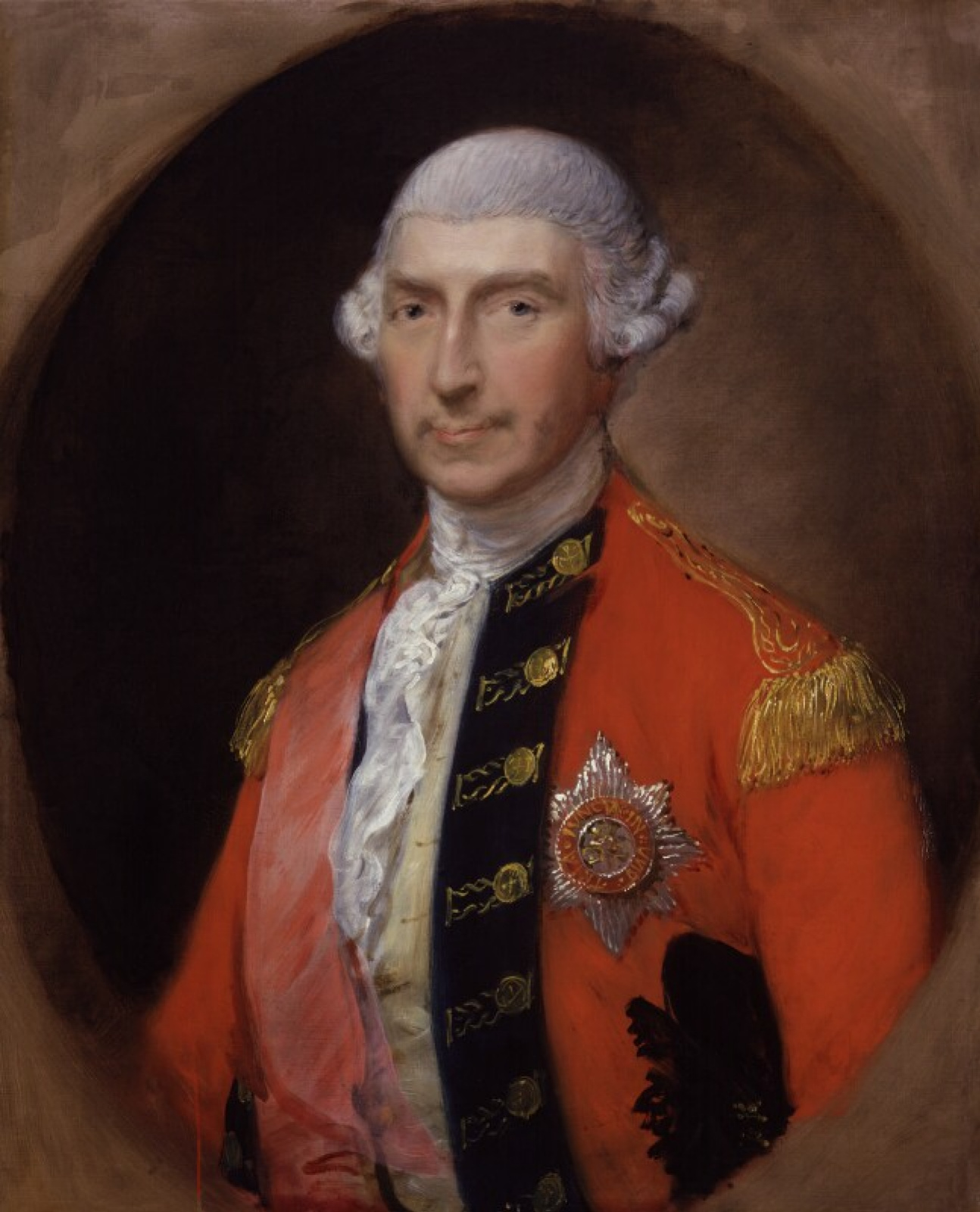
Portrait of Jeffrey Amherst by Thomas Gainsborough, 1780. Amherst was in command of the British land forces who prepared to resist the invasion.

The plan was for the French fleet to meet a Spanish fleet off the Sisargas Islands, near Corunna in north-west Spain, in order to begin an invasion of Britain. The French fleet was commanded by Admiral d'Orvilliers, who had also led at Ushant, and included 30 ships of the line and numerous smaller vessels. When the French reached the rendezvous point, the Spanish fleet was absent, the Spanish later claiming that the winds had been contrary, so d'Orvilliers had to suspend the invasion. Because the French fleet had deliberately departed from Brest before they were fully supplied, numerous problems quickly arose as the wait for the Spanish forces dragged out to several weeks. Scurvy weakened the crew, and in the hot, crowded conditions on board typhus and smallpox also broke out. It was not until 22 July that the Spanish fleet finally arrived, commanded by Don Luis de Córdova, who was to be subordinate to d'Orvilliers in the joint enterprise. It consisted of 36 ships of the line.

Meanwhile, an army of over 40,000 men was slowly being gathered around Le Havre and St. Malo in northern France, with 400 transport boats. The goal of the combined fleet was to put the Royal Navy out of action so that the allied army could be safely transported across the English Channel, (La Manche), and set up a base on either the Isle of Wight or the nearby British coast. At the time there were fewer than 40 Royal Navy ships of the line available in the English Channel area, under the command of the ailing 64-year-old Sir Charles Hardy, who had been desk-bound for 20 years. On 25 July the Franco-Spanish Armada set sail northwards to take on the British fleet, with contrary winds greatly slowing its progress. It soon became apparent that the diseases which had afflicted the French had also spread to the Spanish troops. Having missed opportunities to seize two important British convoys of merchant ships from the West Indies, which reached Plymouth on 31 July, the Armada finally passed Ushant on 11 August and entered the Channel. Three days later, a five-ship squadron under American colours but consisting mostly of French ships with French crews set sail from the French port of L'Orient, heading northward towards Ireland as a diversion. This diversionary fleet was commanded by Captain John Paul Jones of the Continental Navy aboard its flagship, the USS Bonhomme Richard.

=== Action against the Royal Navy ===
Unknown to d'Orvilliers, the British fleet was not in the Channel. Having learned that the French fleet had gone out into the Atlantic in June, Admiral Hardy was instead patrolling off the Scilly Isles. On 14 August, the massive combined Franco-Spanish fleet came within sight of the English coast, causing a wave of alarm which quickly spread throughout the country but did not reach the Royal Navy ship Ardent, which had left Plymouth on 15 August to join Hardy on patrol. On 16 August the French and Spanish ships, which were sailing slowly eastwards up the Channel, received orders from France to turn around, as it had been decided by the government that the best place for the troops to land would be near Falmouth in Cornwall. D'Orvilliers considered this a foolish idea, and sent a reply asking the government to reconsider. The next day Ardent met an outlying French squadron of the great fleet, but was fooled into thinking it was British, and was swiftly captured.

=== Allied failure ===
The Franco-Spanish allies hovered off Plymouth, waiting for a reply to d'Orvilliers' message. On 18 August a gale from the east drove them far to the west and out into the Atlantic. There was one beneficial result: as they struggled eastward again, on 25 August the French and Spanish finally learned the location of Hardy's fleet. They decided to neutralise it quickly, because they were finding it increasingly difficult to cope with sickness and a lack of food. The allies steered for the Scilly Isles with the intention of forcing a battle on the British, but Hardy attempted to dodge their move. On 31 August, under cover of fog, the British fleet slipped past Land's End, and Hardy began leading his would-be opponents as far as he could towards the key British naval base of Portsmouth. Remarkably, on 3 September, the completely undamaged British fleet reached the well-defended safety of the Solent, and set about equipping for battle. This was a problem for the French and Spanish, who were losing men daily to sickness. French military planners also realised that if the invasion were postponed much longer, their troops would be fighting through the British autumn and winter. Accordingly, on that day the leaders of the great Armada abandoned their campaign and set sail for Brest.

== Aftermath ==
Hasty improvements were made to Britain's coastal defences. The first earthworks were erected on the Western Heights at Dover. (These were later expanded as a defence against Napoleon's planned invasion in the early nineteenth century.) In addition, Fort Gillkicker was built at Portsmouth. For the Spanish, the expedition was an expensive waste of time. It prevented them from bringing their full force to bear on Gibraltar, which had strengthened its defences after weak early attacks and was able to successfully hold out until the end of the war. For the French, the expedition was very costly. Keeping so many ships at sea and so many troops waiting at embarkation ports for months on end was hugely expensive, and many sailors died of disease. D'Orvilliers resigned his post soon after returning to France.

The French and Spanish fleets continued joint operations afterward, primarily against isolated British garrisons in order to protect troop landings, rather than as a direct challenge to the Royal Navy. A large British convoy of 63 ships was captured by a Franco-Spanish fleet in 1780. Notable exceptions were the unsuccessful commitment to the Great Siege of Gibraltar, and another abortive pursuit of the Channel Fleet in August 1781, which was not part of an invasion plan.

== Bibliography ==
- "The Armada", H2G2, The BBC, archived from the original on 2 March 2009.
- "Spanish soldiers", South coast star, archived from the original on 30 September 2013.
- Chavez, Thomas (2002), Spain and the Independence of the United States, UNM Press, p. 138, ISBN 9780826327949.
- Hippeau, Célestin, ed. (1863), "4", Le gouvernement de Normandie au XVIIe et au XVIIIe siècle [The government of Normandy at the 17th and 18th centuries] (transcripts of French documents, with introduction) (in French), vol. 1, Caen: Goussiaume de Laporte; volume 2.
- Leboucher, Odet-Julien (1830), "4", Histoire de la Guerre de l'Indépendance des États Unis [History of the War of Independence of the United States] (in French) (rev. ed.), Paris: Anselin.
- Mahan, Alfred Thayer (1913), "4, 7", The Major Operations of the Navies in the War of American Independence, London: Sampson Low.
- McLynn, Frank (1987), Invasion: From the Armada to Hitler, 1588–1945, Routledge & Kegan Paul.
- Middleton, Richard (2012), The War of American Independence, Pearson
- del Río, Antonio Ferrer (1856), "2", Historia del reinado de Carlos III en España, vol. 3, Madrid: Matute.
- Patterson, Alfred Temple (1960), The Other Armada: The Franco-Spanish attempt to invade Britain in 1779, Manchester, UK: Manchester University Press.
- Regan, Geoffrey (2012), Great Naval Blunders, Andre Deutsch, ISBN 978-0233003504
