= Luc Urbain du Bouëxic, comte de Guichen =

French Navy officer

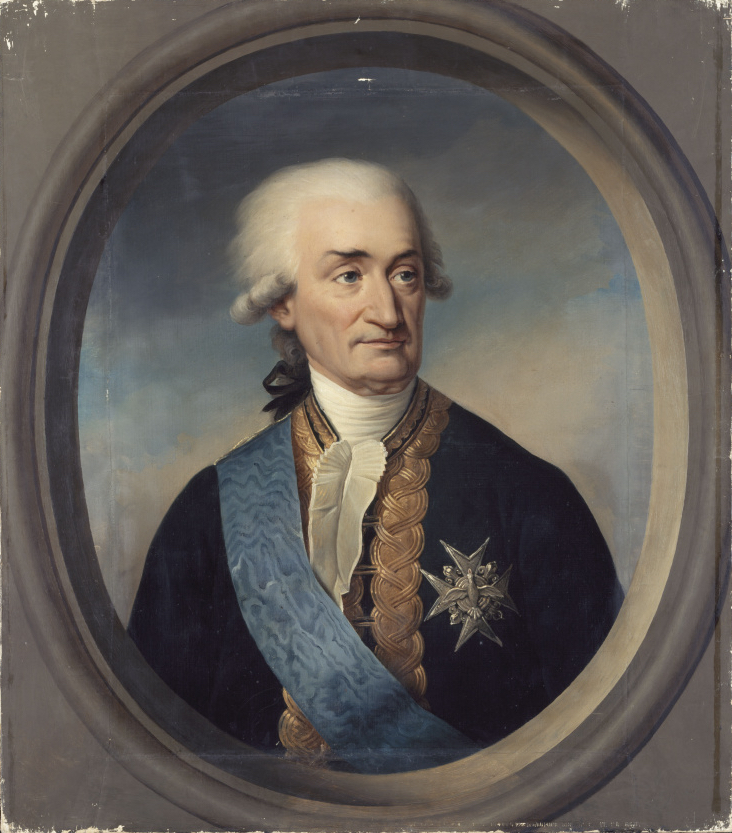
- Portrait by Jean-Baptiste Paulin Guérin, 1832
- Born: 21 June 1712; Fougères, Ille-et-Vilaine
- Died: 13 January 1790 (aged 77) Morlaix, France
- Allegiance: France
- Branch: French Navy
- Service years: 1730–1783
- Rank: Lieutenant général des armées navales
- Conflicts: War of the Austrian Succession; Seven Years' War; American Revolutionary War; Battle of Ushant (1778); Battle of Martinique (1780); Battle of Ushant (1781)
- Awards: Order of Saint Louis; Order of the Holy Spirit

Luc Urbain du Bouëxic, comte de Guichen (June 21, 1712 – January 13, 1790) was a French Navy officer who commanded the fleets that fought the Royal Navy at the Battle of Ushant and Battle of Martinique during the American Revolutionary War.

== Biography ==
Guichen joined the Navy in 1730 as a Garde-Marine. He was promoted to lieutenant de vaisseau in 1746.

In 1748, Guichen fought five battles against superior British forces, while a convoy escorting from the Caribbean back to France. He was made a Knight in the Order of Saint Louis that same year.

In 1755, he participated in the abortive relief expedition to Louisbourg under Emmanuel-Auguste de Cahideuc, comte Dubois de la Motte on the 70-gun Héros. In 1775 he was appointed to the frigate Terpsichore, attached to the Escadre d'évolution. He was promoted to Captain in May 1756.

The year after, he was promoted to Chef d'Escadre.

=== First Battle of Ushant ===
After France entered the War of American Independence, Guichen was appointed to the command of the Channel fleet, which he led in the Battle of Ushant on 27 July 1778. His flagship, the 104-gun Ville de Paris, was next in line to the fleet flagship Bretagne. In March 1779, he was promoted Lieutenant Général des Armées navales, As such he commanded the French van in the Combined fleet of Orvillers and Córdoba from June to September.

=== Battle of Martinique ===
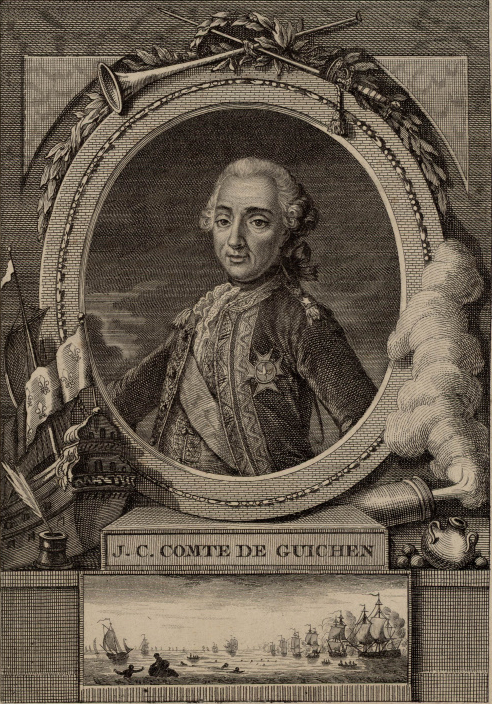
Luc Urbain de Bouexic, comte de Guichen (1712–1790).

In January 1780, Guichen was sent to the West Indies with a fleet. On 17 April to the leeward of Martinique, Guichen's fleet met a British fleet under Admiral of the White Sir George Rodney, leading to the inconclusive Battle of Martinique. During the engagement, both Rodney's HMS Sandwich and Guichen's Couronne were temporarily cut off from their respective fleets and had to bear the brunt of the battle. Two inconclusive actions followed on 15 May and 19 May 1780. With the hurricane season approaching in July, Guichen left the West Indies and returned home, reaching Cádiz in September with a convoy of 95 merchantmen. Guichen's second-in-command, Hippolyte de Sade de Vaudronne, died at sea as the fleet arrived.

=== 1781 action in the Bay of Biscay ===
In December 1781, Guichen was tasked to carry stores and reinforcements to the West Indies. On 12 December, British Admiral Kempenfelt intercepted Guichen's squadron in the Bay of Biscay through a temporary clearance in a fog, at a moment when Guichen's warships were to leeward of the convoy, and attacked the transports at once, yielding the Second Battle of Ushant. Kempenfelt captured twenty of the transports and forced the others to retreat to port. Having failed his mission, Guichen then also returned to port. He had no opportunity to gain any counterbalancing success during the short remainder of the war, but he was present at the final relief of Gibraltar by Lord Howe.

== Legacy ==
Guichen Bay in South Australia and the French ship Guichen of the First World War were named after him.

In 1785, Guichen was elected an international member of the American Philosophical Society in Philadelphia.
