= Louis Charles du Chaffault de Besné =

French Navy officer (1708–1794)

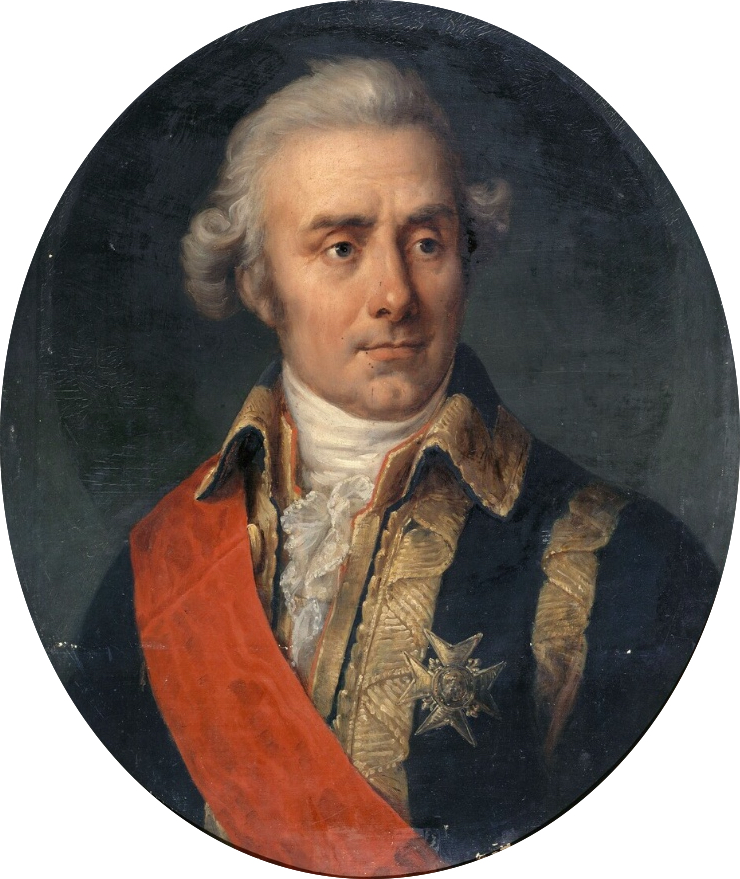
- Born: 29 February 1708; Montaigu, France
- Died: 29 June 1794 (aged 86) Nantes, France
- Branch: French Navy
- Rank: Vice-amiral
- Conflicts: Bombardment of Tripoli; Second Battle of Cape Finisterre; Siege of Louisbourg; Larache expedition Battle of Ushant; Armada of 1779

Louis Charles du Chaffault de Besné (Note: Sometimes written "Duchaffault".) (Montaigu, 29 February 1708 – Nantes, 29 June 1794) was a French Navy officer. He notably took part in the Second Battle of Cape Finisterre in 1747, and was one of the commanders at the Battle of Ushant on 27 July 1778. He also lead the Larache expedition

== Biography ==
Duchaffault joined the Navy as a Garde-Marine in November 1725. In 1727, he served on the 70-gun Achille, off Spain. The year after, he took part in the Bombardment of Tripoli by Grandpré, serving on the 30-gun frigate Astrée.

Duchaffault was promoted to Ensign in 1733. He was appointed to positions ashore in Brest, before returning to Astrée in 1737, fighting the Salé Rovers. In 1739, he served on the 16-gun Méduse in the Baltic, then on the 46-gun ship of the line Parfaite in the Caribbean in 1740, and on the 64-gun Saint Michel between 1742 and 1744.

He was promoted to Lieutenant in 1746. In February 1747, he was given command of the 40-gun frigate Atalante, and cruised off Saint-Domingue with Sirène, under Guichen. Later that year, on 25 October 1747, he distinguished himself at the Second Battle of Cape Finisterre. In 1751, he captained the 24-gun frigate Friponne for missions off Saint-Domingue.

He was promoted to captain in 1754, and given command of the 80-gun Formidable. He returned to Atalante, part of a squadron under Aubigny, taking part in the capture of HMS Warwick on 11 March 1756. He also part in the Siege of Louisbourg, commanding Dragon. In 1758, he was in command of a division, and he captured the East Indiaman Carnarvon.

In 1760, he captained the 70-gun Magnifique.

Duchaffault was promoted to Chef d'escadre in 1764. In June 1765, he took part in the Larache expedition.

In 1772, Duchaffault was one of the promoters of the Escadre d'évolution, commanding the 50-gun Fier.

Duchaffault was promoted to Lieutenant général des Armées navales on 6 February 1777. He commanded the Read-guard of the French fleet at the Battle of Ushant on 27 July 1778, with his flag on the 80-gun Couronne, where he was gravely wounded.

In 1779, he commanded a division in the Armada of 1779, with his flag on Ville de Paris. He then served as commander of the naval forces in Rochefort. He was promoted to Vice-amiral on 1 January 1792.

During the Reign of Terror, Duchaffault was arrested and imprisoned. He died in captivity in Nantes on 29 June 1794.

== Legacy ==
In the late 1860s and early 1870s, the French Navy built the cruiser Duchaffault, named fr the admiral.

In 1931, naval historian André Vovard authored the biography L'Amiral du Chaffault. That same year, Paul Chack published L'homme d'Ouessant, Du Chaffault.

Rue du Chaffault in Paris and Rue Amiral-du-Chaffault in Nantes are named in his honour.
