= Lieutenant général des armées navales =

Lieutenant général des armées navales (lit. 'Lieutenant general of the naval armies') was a naval rank in the French Navy during the ancien Régime and until the French Revolution.

== History ==
In 1652, Cardinal Mazarin created the rank of lieutenant général des armées navales in the French Navy as an immediate subordinate of admirals, tasked with managing the chefs d'escadre of the Ponant Fleet in Brest. In 1654, a second position of lieutenant général was created for the Levant Fleet in Toulon. The rank was changed to vice admiral in c. 1792.

== Sources and references ==
Notes

Citations

References

- Vergé-Franceschi, Michel (2002). Dictionnaire d'Histoire maritime. Paris: Robert Laffont. ISBN 2-221-08751-8.
