= 64-gun ship =

Type of ship of the line

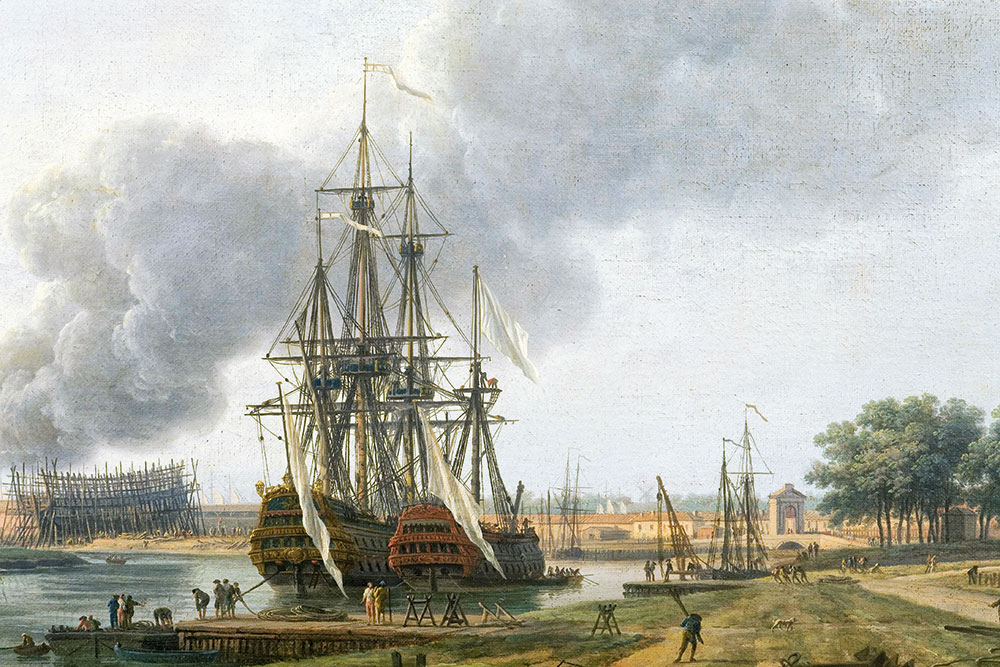
View of Rochefort harbour, by Joseph Vernet, showing a 74-gun and a 64-gun moored side by side.

The 64-gun ship of the line was a type of two-decker warship defined during the 18th century, named after the number of their guns. 64-guns had a lower battery of 24-pounders and an upper battery of 12-pounders. Heavier variants with 18-pounders on the upper deck also existed.

== History ==
The French Navy used "64-gun" as a typology for its ships. In the British Royal Navy, such lighter two-deckers were considered to be Third-rates, like 74-guns and 80-guns.

During the reign of Louis XIV, numerous ships carried 60 or 62 guns, with a lower battery pierced for 12 guns on each side. During the reign of Louis XV, standardisation efforts were undertaken to rationalise the design and construction of these ships, with a common armament of 24-pounder, 12-pounder, and 8-pounder long guns. The first 64-gun in this sense was Borée, launched in 1734 and pierced with 13 gun ports on each side of her lower battery. The British started copying these ships in 1764 with HMS Asia and also stopped building 60-gun ships. British ships had a slightly heavier broadside, as they typically carried 18-pounders on their upper gundeck, while the French would usually have 12-pounders.

64-guns were no match for 74-guns, which had a 36-pounders (in France) or 32-pounders (in England) lower battery and 18-pounders on the upper gundeck (some later units even experimented with 24-pounders in the upper deck) and were usually slower than frigates. Their main advantage were their cheaper cost and lower draft. This would be especially important for operations in India.

The French built 61 of these 64-gun ships, the last one being Jason in 1779. Three were razeed, turning them into frigates capable of carrying a 24-pounder main armament, although these ships typically fell back to 18-pounders like most heavy frigates of their time.

The British built 43, and maintained production a while longer, as 64-guns were useful for escorting merchant convoys. The last British 64-gun to be launched was HMS Veteran, in 1787.

== Dimensions ==
Most 64-gun were one-offs, and the others were part of a short series put in production in the mid-18th century. In France, the main classes of 64-guns were

- The Lion class: Lion, Sage, and Fantasque (1751-1758);
- The Artésien class, by Joseph-Louis Ollivier: Artésien, Roland, Alexandre, Protée and Éveillé 64 (launched 10 December 1772 at Brest)
- The Brillant class: Brillant and Solitaire
- The Réfléchi class: Réfléchi and Caton

In the late 18th century 64-guns were between 43 and 48 metres long, about 13.5 metres wide, and had a hull depth of 5.5 to 6 metres.

== Armament ==
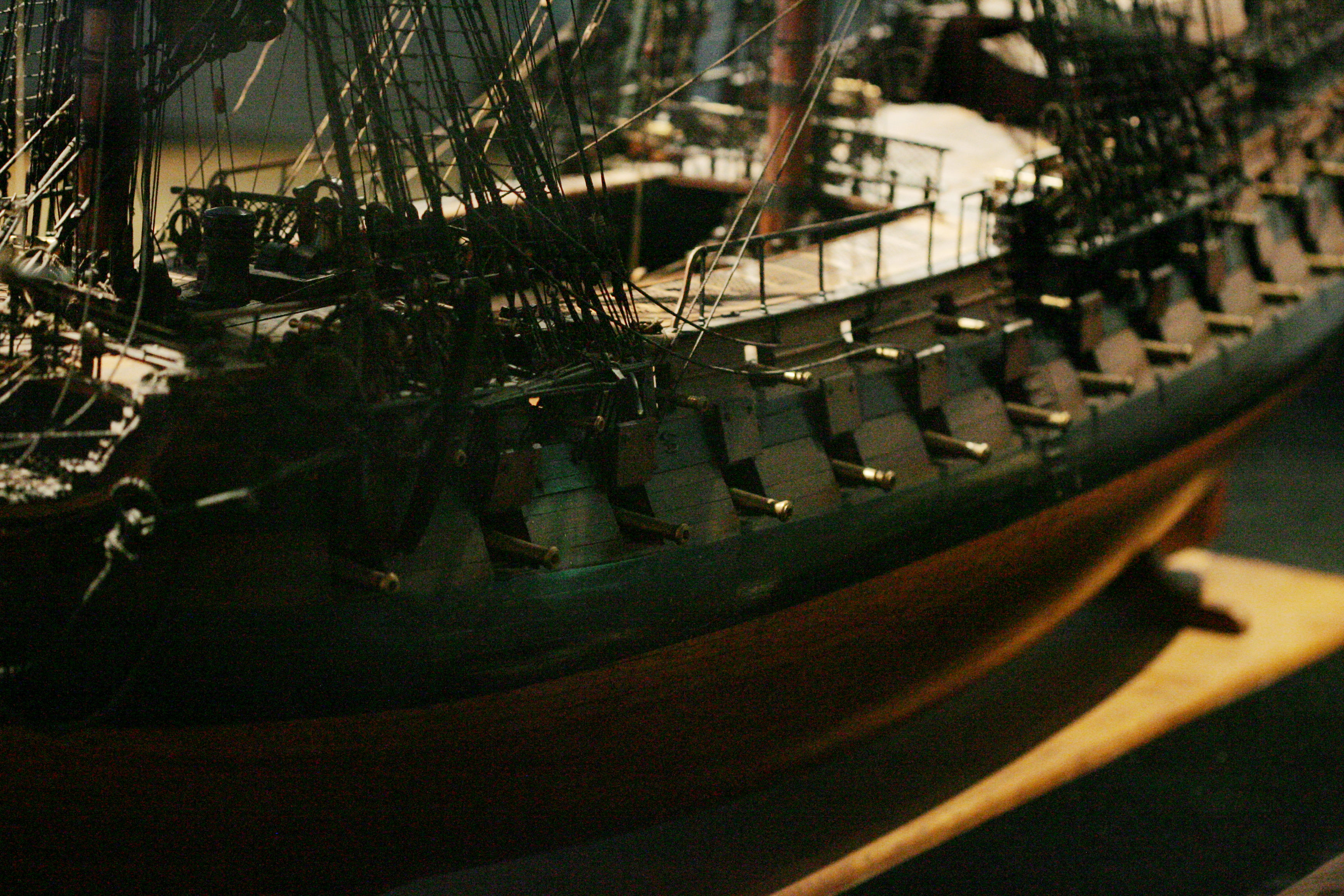
Arsenal model of Artésien, with 24-pounders on the lower gundeck and 12-poudners in the upper.

French 64-guns carried the standardised armament of:

- 26 24-pounders on the lower gundeck;
- 28 12-pounders on the upper gundeck;
- 10 6-pounders on the forecastle and quarterdeck.

Amounting to a 510-pound broadside.

British ships would typically carry:

- 26 24-pounders on the lower gundeck;
- 26 18-pounders on the upper;
- 10 4-pounders and 2 9-pounders on forecastle and quarterdeck.

Amounting to a 575-pound broadside.

== Crew ==
French regulations of 1 January 1786 defined the wartime crew as 538 men, while the peacetime crew was 377. This comprised 12 officers, 7 student or volunteer officers, 47 non-commissioned officers, 36 gunners of the troupes de marine, 6 helmsmen, 288 seamen, 70 soldiers of the troupes de marine or Line infantry, 44 boys, 13 valets, and 12 others.

== Sources and references ==
=== Bibliography ===
- Troude, Onésime-Joachim (1867). Batailles navales de la France (in French). Vol. 2. Challamel ainé. OCLC 836362484.

=== External links ===
- "Monographie du Fleuron (1729)". ancre.fr/. Archived from the original on 2011-01-22.
- "Maquette du Fleuron". maquettes-marine.pagesperso-orange.fr/.
- "Le Fleuron". gerard.delacroix.pagesperso-orange.fr/.
- "La monographie de l'Artésien (1764)". ancre.fr/. Archived from the original on 4 March 2010.
