= Paul Chack =

French Navy officer, writer and Nazi collaborator

Louis Paul André Chack
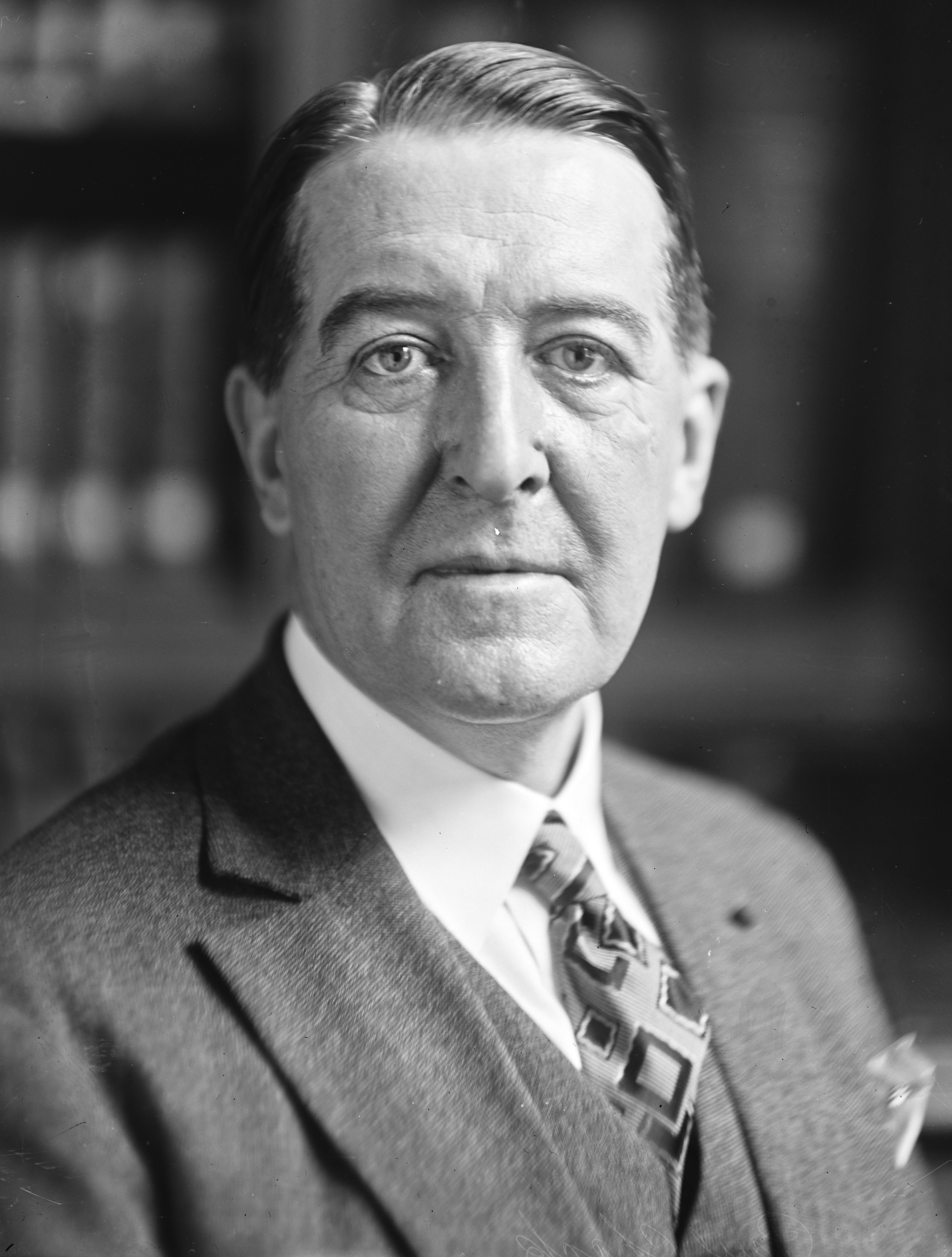
- Born: 26 February 1876; Paris, French Third Republic
- Died: 9 January 1945 (aged 68); Fort de Montrouge, French Fourth Republic
- Status: Executed
- Conviction: Treason
- Penalty: Death

Louis Paul André Chack (12 February 1876 – 9 January 1945) was a French Navy officer, author and Nazi collaborator. He served in the Navy during the First World War and spent the interwar period writing books on naval history and agitating at the far right. During the Second World War, he eagerly collaborated with the Nazis and presided a so-called "Comité d'action antibolchévique" ("Committee for Anti-Bolshevik Action"). At the Liberation, he was arrested, tried for treason and executed by firing squad.

== Biography ==
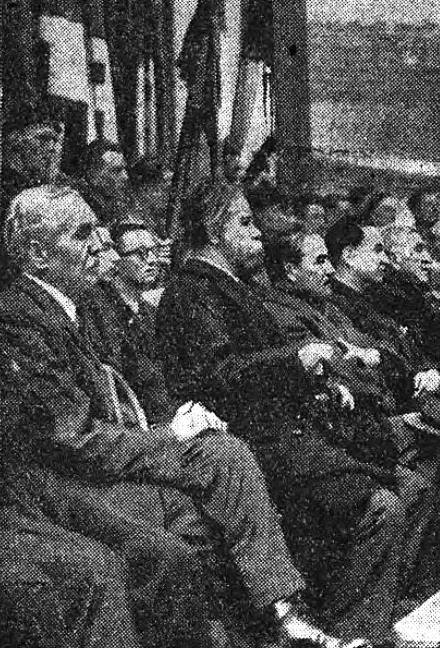
Meeting of the Front révolutionnaire national at the Vélodrome d'Hiver on 11 April 1943. Shown on the image:from left to right: Georges Claude, Châteaubriant, Marcel Déat, Bucard, Paul Chack. Also present outside the frame: Henri Barbé, Francis Desphelippon, Lucien Rebatet, Dr. André Rainsart, Georges Soulès, Kléber Legay.

Chack was born to Marie-Louise Chack, also known as "Marie Scalini" (1852–1931), and of Lord Fingall, who refused to marry her but still purchased a house for her and paid her a pension.

Chack joined the École Navale in October 1893, the 50th of the 75 students of the class of that year. He graduated in 1896.

He served on the battleship Hoche, then on Masséna in the North sea, and was promoted to Ensign first class in October 1898. He then served on Mouette at Constantinople, where he earned a Turkish medal by fighting a fire.

Chack was promoted to lieutenant de vaisseau in May 1906, and given command of the submarine Grondin. In 1908, he was appointed as aid to the general governor of Indochina.

He served on Jauréguiberry in 1912 as gunnery officer, and was promoted to the fire direction of the battleship Courbet in 1914. In June 1915, he was given command of the destroyer Massue, taking part in the Gallipoli campaign. On 27 November 1916, he attacked a German submarine, earning an Army-level mention in dispatches.

Check was promoted to lieutenant-commander in July 1917, and to commander in June 1920. He captained the battleship Provence in the Mediterranean before transferring to the Service historique de la marine as Direction 1921. In 1927, he was received as a member of the Académie de marine. He was promoted to captain in July 1929, and retired from the Navy in November 1934 with the rank of captain.

From the 1920. Chack started writing numerous works about the Navy and naval history.

Chack started mixing with Far-Right elements infiltrating the veteran associations of the time. He was vice-président of the l'Association nationale des officiers combattants (ANOC), under Right-Wing personalities such as Colonel Jean Ferrandi and Charles Trochu. Chack was also president of the Club de l'Effort, an organisation founded by reserve officers, many of whom were members of the far-right Ligues.

In 1937, he was among the Right-wing and Far-Right personalities in honouring Charles Maurras when he was freed from prison. He joined Jacques Doriot's Parti populaire français (PPF) in 1937.

During the Nazi Occupation, Chack supported Collaboration with the Third Reich. He also displayed a virulent antisemitism. He notably inaugurated the Institut d'étude des questions juives in May 1941, and wrote antisemitic editorials in journals.

Chack was president of the Comité d’action antibolchévique (1941–1944), an anticommunist and antisemitic propaganda outlet used as a recruitment organ for the Légion des volontaires français contre le bolchévisme. Chack inaugurated the exhibit Le Bolchevisme contre l'Europe, along with French and German fascists such as Paul Marion, Fernand de Brinon or Georges Claude.

On 22 August 1944, after the Libération, Chack was arrested and imprisoned at Drancy, and then at Fresnes. He was tried by the Cour de justice of Seine, sentenced to death on 18 December 1944 and shot on 9 January 1945 at fort de Montrouge, near Paris.

== Honours ==
- Croix de guerre
- Legion of Honour: Knight in 1909, Officer in 1921, Commandeur on 21 November 1934. Expelled for treason in 1945.

== Works ==
- Au large d'Ouessant (Éditions de France, collection "la mer et notre Empire")
- Du Maroc à l'Océan Indien (Éditions de France, collection "la mer et notre Empire")
- Les Explorateurs (Éditions de France, collection "la mer et notre Empire")
- Face aux Anglais (Éditions de France, collection "la mer et notre Empire")
- La Fin d'un Pirate (Éditions de France, collection "la mer et notre Empire")
- Courbet, le vainqueur de Fou-Tchéou , Édition Amiot-Dumont
- Les Grandes Croisières françaises (ouvrage pour la reliure duquel Jean Goulden réalisa des émaux.)
- On se bat sur mer, Éditions de France, 1926 (prix de La Renaissance)
- Des Dardanelles aux brumes du Nord (Éditions de France, collection "Marins à la bataille")
- Patrouilles tragiques dans la nuit (Éditions de France, collection "Marins à la bataille")
- Combats de mer au grand soleil (Éditions de France, collection "Marins à la bataille")
- La route des Indes sauvée par la France (Éditions de France, collection "Marins à la bataille")
- Héros de l'Adriatique (Éditions de France, collection "Marins à la bataille")
- Survivants prodigieux (Éditions de France, collection "Marins à la bataille")
- Sur mer... Et dessous (Éditions de France, collection "Marins à la bataille")
- Luttes sans merci au sud et au nord (Éditions de France, collection "Marins à la bataille")
- Avions, torpilleurs et voiliers au feu (Éditions de France, collection "Marins à la bataille"), 1933, avec des illustrations de Léon Haffner.
- Petits navires, grandes luttes (Éditions de France, collection "Marins à la bataille")
- La bataille de Lépante(Les Éditions de France, collection" Marins à la Bataille").
- Trafalgar (Les Éditions de France, collection " Marins à la Bataille").
- Hasards de guerre (Les Éditions de France, collection " Marins à la Bataille ").
- Les Frégates du Roi (Les Éditions de France, collection "Marins à la Bataille").
- La guerre des croiseurs, du 4 août 1914 à la bataille des Falkland (Deux volumes et deux atlas.)
- Sur les bancs de Flandre (avec 2 cartes dessinées par P. Chack), Les Éditions de France, 1927
- Ceux du blocus (avec 11 cartes dessinées par P. Chack), Les Éditions de France, 1928
- Tu seras marin (Les Éditions de France, 1939. collection "Marins à la Bataille", dessins de Léon Haffner).
- Histoire maritime de la Première guerre mondiale par Paul Chack et Jean-Jacques Antier (France-Empire, 3 volumes, réédition abrégée en 1 volume, 1992)
- Hoang-Tham, pirate, Éditions de France, 1933
- Chack, Paul (1931). L'homme d'Ouessant, Du Chaffault. Paris: Redier. OCLC 716918045.

== Bibliography ==
- Taguieff, Pierre-André (1999). L'antisémitisme de plume, 1940–1944. Pensée politique et sciences sociales. Berg International. p. 618. ISBN 2-911289-16-1. OCLC 868428467., [présentation en ligne].
- Étienne Taillemite (2002). Dictionnaire des marins français (in French). Paris: Tallandier. pp. 93–94. ISBN 978-2-847-34008-2. OCLC 50268241.
- Bergeron, Francis (2013). Chack. Qui suis-je? (in French). Grez-sur-Loing: Pardès. p. 127. ISBN 978-2-867-14466-0. OCLC 858211613..
