= Chef d'escadre =

French Navy flag officer rank

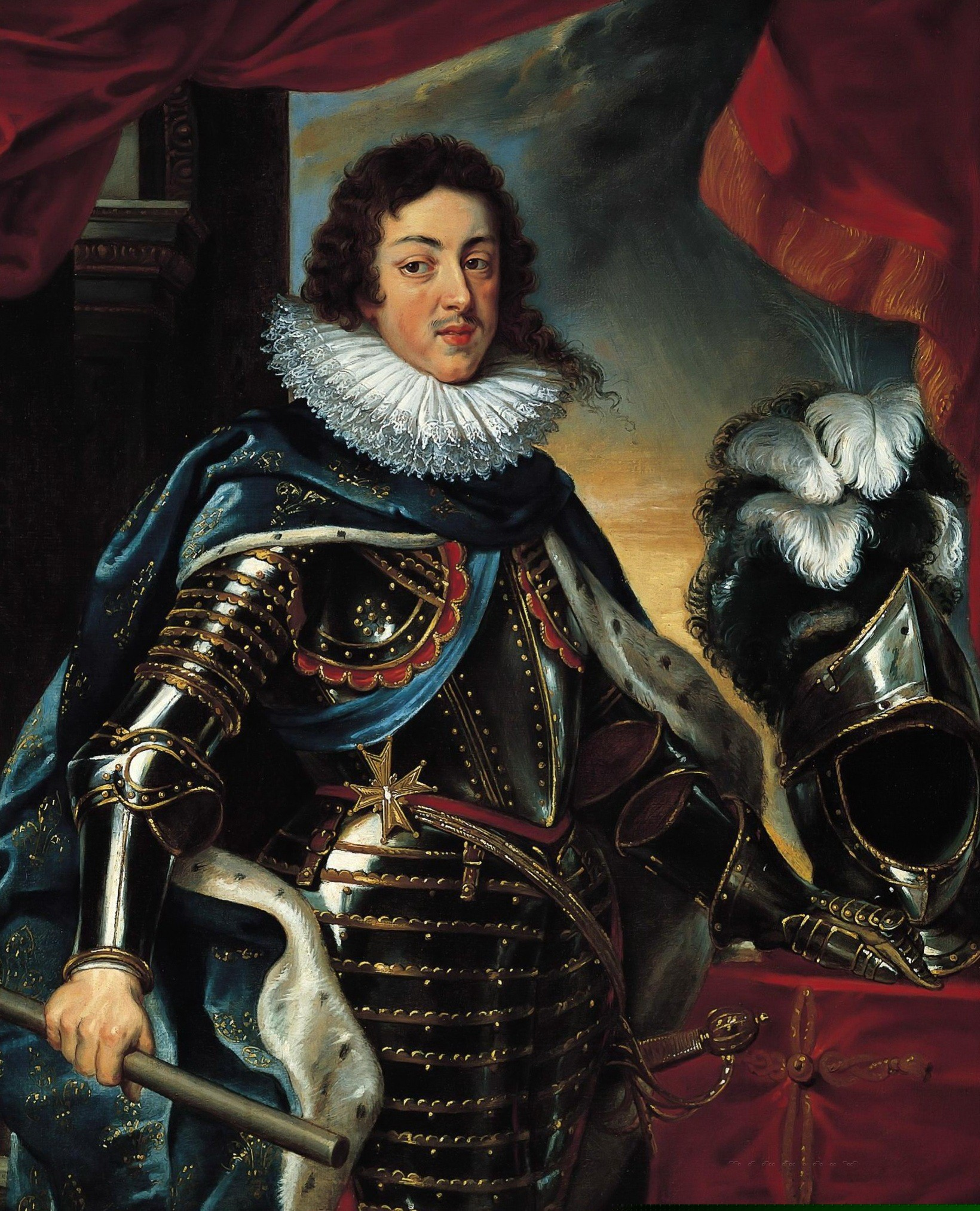
Louis XIII, who created the rank

Chef d'escadre (pronounced [ʃɛf dɛskadʁ]; literally "squadron commander") was a flag officer rank in the French Navy used during the ancien régime until the French Revolution. The rank was changed to counter admiral by a law passed by the National Constituent Assembly on 15 May 1791.

== History ==
The rank of chef d'escadre was created by Louis XIII in 1627, when he appointed several French Navy officers as chefs d'escadre to command the ports of Le Havre in Normandy, Brest in Brittany and Brouage in Guyenne. Each of these chefs d'escadres, as officiers d'épée, were flanked by a commissioner general, an officier de plume. The number of chefs d'escadre grew rapidly: in 1635 a chef d'escadre of Provence was created, then in 1647 a chef d'escadre for Flanders, in 1663 one for Poitou-Saintonge, in 1673 one for Picardy and another for Languedoc, in 1689 one for Aunis, in 1701 one for America, and in 1707 one for Roussillon. After 1715, there were more chefs d'escadre than there were coastal provinces, and so they started taking the title "chefs d'escadre des armées navales" (squadron commanders of the naval armies). In 1772, there were 25 officers with the rank.

Chefs d'escadres were chosen from among the French navy's ship-of-the-line captains, and their command flag consisted of a "cornette" flown at the top of their flagship's mainmast. The flag was named after its resemblance in shape to a cornette, making it roughly the same shape as the broad pennants flown by the Royal Navy's commodores. The rank of chef d'escadre was junior to lieutenant général des armées navales (lieutenant general of the naval armies). From 25 March 1765, the rank was senior to brigadier des armées navales (brigadier of the naval armies), which was renamed chef de division (division commander) on 1 January 1786. The rank of chef d'escadre was changed to counter admiral by a law passed by the National Constituent Assembly on 15 May 1791.

== Sources and references ==
Notes

Citations

References

- Vergé-Franceschi, Michel (2002). Dictionnaire d'Histoire maritime. Paris: Robert Laffont. ISBN 2-221-08751-8.
