= Louis Guillouet, comte d'Orvilliers =

French Navy officer

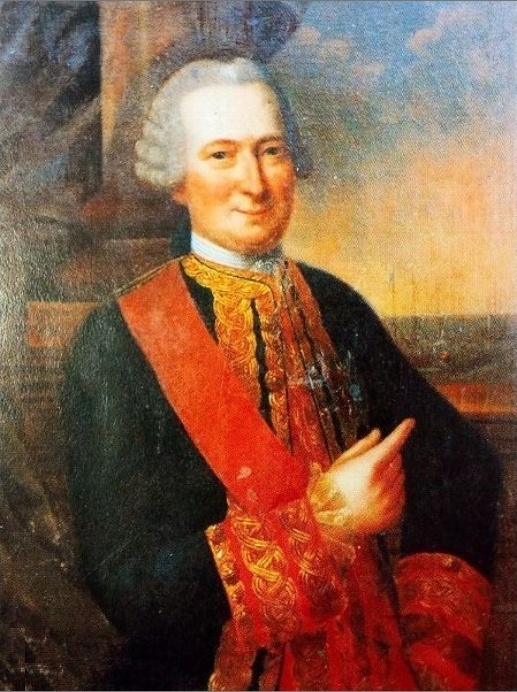
Louis Guillouet, comte d'Orvilliers.

Louis Guillouet, comte d'Orvilliers (26 March 1710 – 1792) was a French Navy officer.

== Life ==
Louis Guillouet d'Orvilliers was born on 26 March 1710 in Moulins, Allier. His parents were Claude Guillouet d'Orvilliers (c. 1670–1740), seigneur d'Orvilliers, and Claude de Vict de Pongibaud (c. 1680–1759). His older brother was Gilbert Guillouet d'Orvilliers, (c. 1708 – 11 May 1764), governor of French Guiana from 1749 to 1763, D'Orvilliers spent most of his childhood in Cayenne, capital of the French colony French Guiana, where his father was governor. In 1723, aged fifteen, he joined the colony's infantry regiment and quickly rose to the rank of Lieutenant. In 1728, he transferred to the Navy and, by 1756, had become a captain, commanding one of the ships sent to Menorca under the direction of La Galissonière. He later took part in action near Santo Domingo and the Antilles and was rewarded with a promotion to rear admiral in 1764.

== Franco-American alliance ==
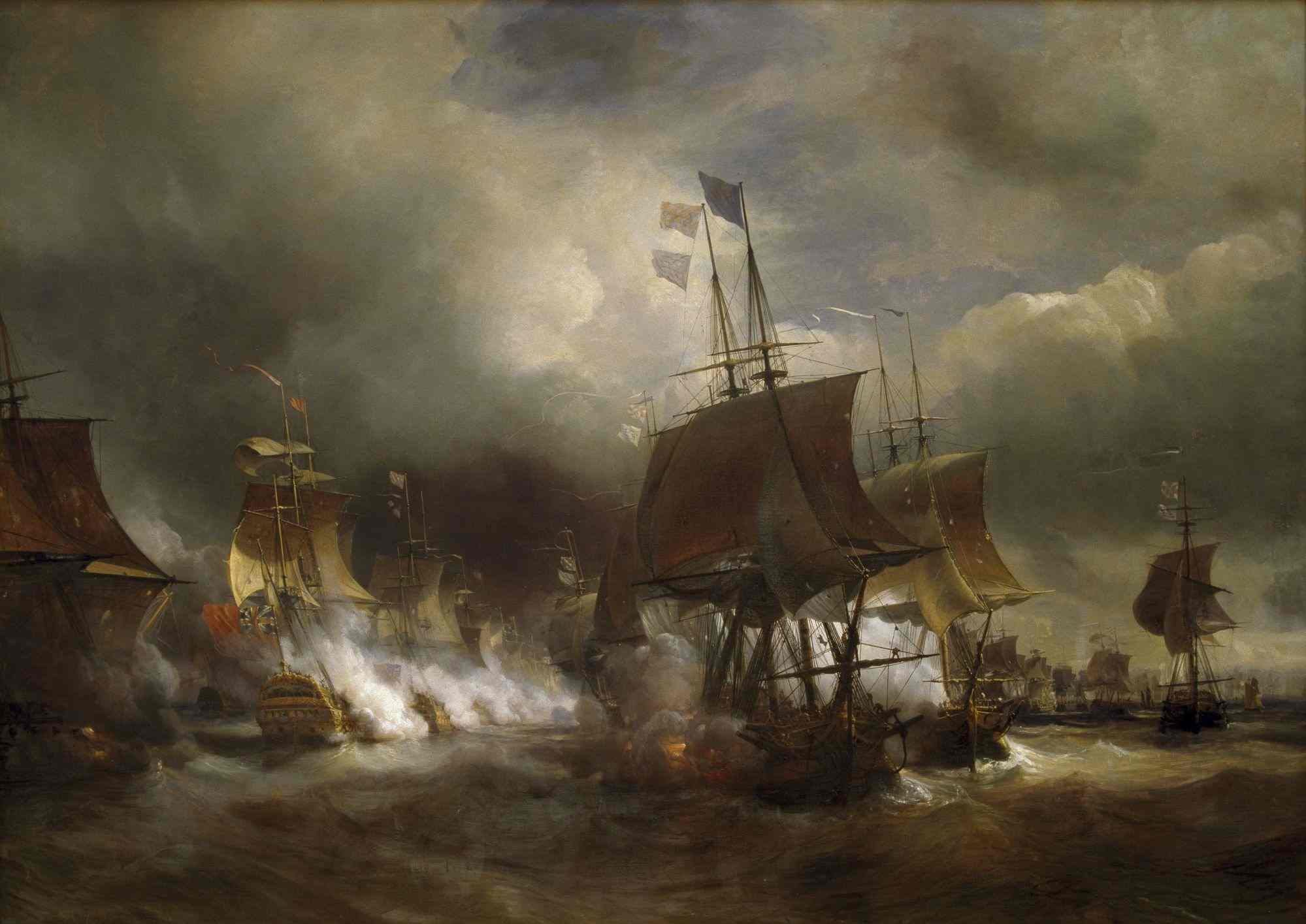
1839 painting of the Battle of Ushant by Théodore Gudin

In 1777, France joined the United States in their war for independence from Great Britain. D'Orvilliers was promoted to lieutenant général des armées navales and made preparations to engage the Royal Navy in the Atlantic Ocean. On 27 July 1778, his fleet fought the inconclusive Battle of Ushant against a British fleet under Admiral Augustus Keppel.

In the following year, D'Orvilliers led an unsuccessful attempt to raid the English ports of Portsmouth and Plymouth. Although the weather and crew sickness played a part, he was censured for not making better use of the forces under his command. As a consequence, he resigned his command. The death of D'Orvilliers's wife in 1783 affected him greatly and he withdrew to the St. Magloire seminary in Paris. He later returned to the town of his birth, Moulins, where he died in 1792.

== Descendants ==
D'Orvilliers encouraged his grandson, Hugues Duroy de Chaumareys, to enter Naval service. He did not live to witness the court-martial, disgrace and label of "incompetent and complacent" that was triggered by the sinking of the frigate French frigate Méduse (1810) and loss of circa 150 lives, plus the notoriety of the painting by Théodore Géricault of the shipwreck scene The Raft of the Medusa which hangs in the Louvre.

== Sources ==
- Garric, Alain, "Gilbert GUILLOUET D'ORVILLIERS", Geneanet (in French)
- Snow, Edward Rowe (1979). Tales of terror and tragedy. New York: Dodd, Mead. ISBN 978-0396077756.
