= Richard Paton =

English painter (1717–1791)

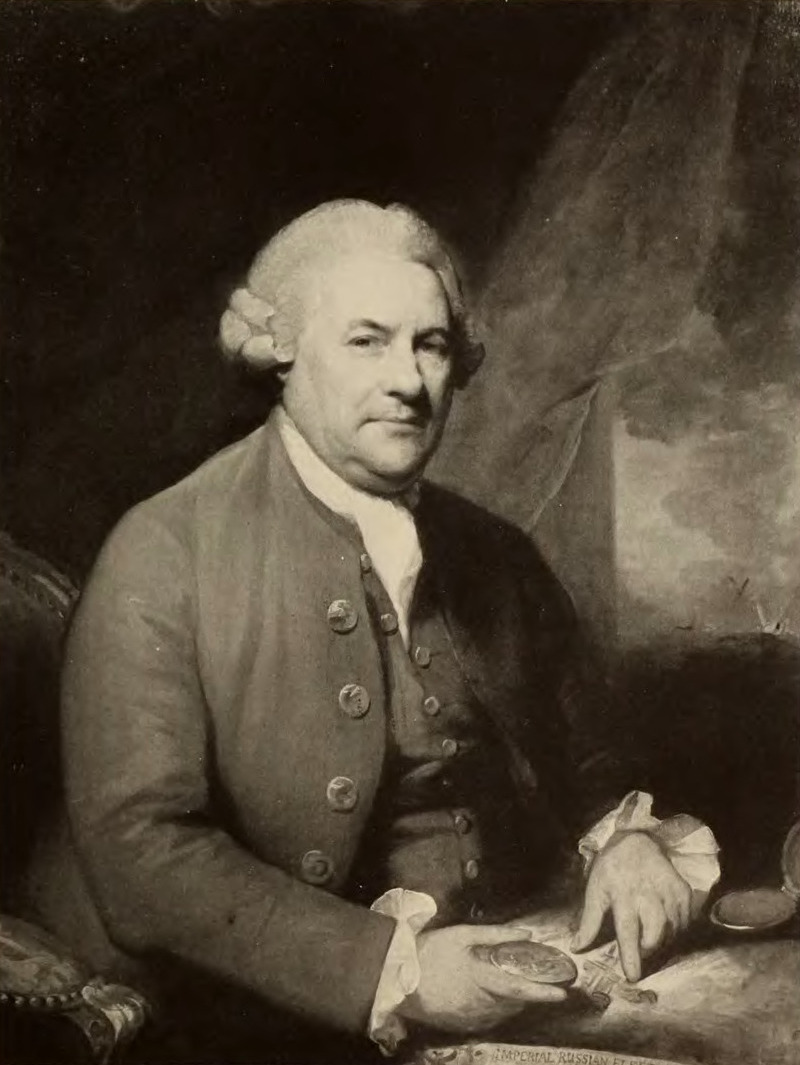
- Portrait by Gilbert Stuart
- Born: 1717; London, England
- Died: 7 March 1791 (aged 73–74); London, England
- Occupation: Painter

Richard Paton (1717 – 7 March 1791) was an English painter who specialised in marine art.

== Life ==
Paton spent his artistic career in London, where he is said to have been born, although no record of his birthplace or parentage is known. He is said to have grown up in poverty, and he is described as "self-taught". Some critics have discerned an influence of the works of Samuel Scott and Charles Brooking. According to an account by Harry Parker, in The Mariner's Mirror, (Note: March, 1912. p.85.) while Paton was begging on Tower Hill, he attracted the attention of Admiral Sir Charles Knowles, who happened to be passing that way.Taking a fancy to the boy, he offered to take him to sea. Paton was assistant to the ship's painter on Knowles' ship. Paton gained knowledge in both painting and seamanship. In 1742, he started working at the Excise Office.

His first exhibition was in 1758 on the premises of the London-based Society of Artists, where he continued to exhibit up to 1770. The Royal Academy hosted his works between 1762 and 1780. Paton's specialities were marine and naval paintings. He painted naval actions of wars ongoing at the time of painting such as the Seven Years' War of 1756–1763 and later the American Revolutionary War, as well as earlier events such as the battles of the War of the Quadruple Alliance which took place when he was a baby. The paintings include many dramatic effects such as battles at night, the shooting of cannons and the effect of bombardments.

Paton also painting civilian themes, such as merchant ships becalmed. His "sublime depiction of the sky" was considered especially noteworthy. Prints of his works, made among others by French artist Pierre-Charles Canot, made them widely known. Among his most well-known works is the Action Between the Serapis and Bonhomme Richard, depicting the confrontation of the British Captain Richard Pearson and the American Captain John Paul Jones, occurring on 23 September 1779, during the Battle of Flamborough Head off of the Yorkshire coast. Although the battle ended with an American victory, the painting achieved success. This success was due in no small part to the prints published within a year of the battle by James Fittler and Daniel Lerpinière, of which Paton's painting was included. The painting is in the museum of the United States Naval Academy at Annapolis, Maryland.

== Gallery ==
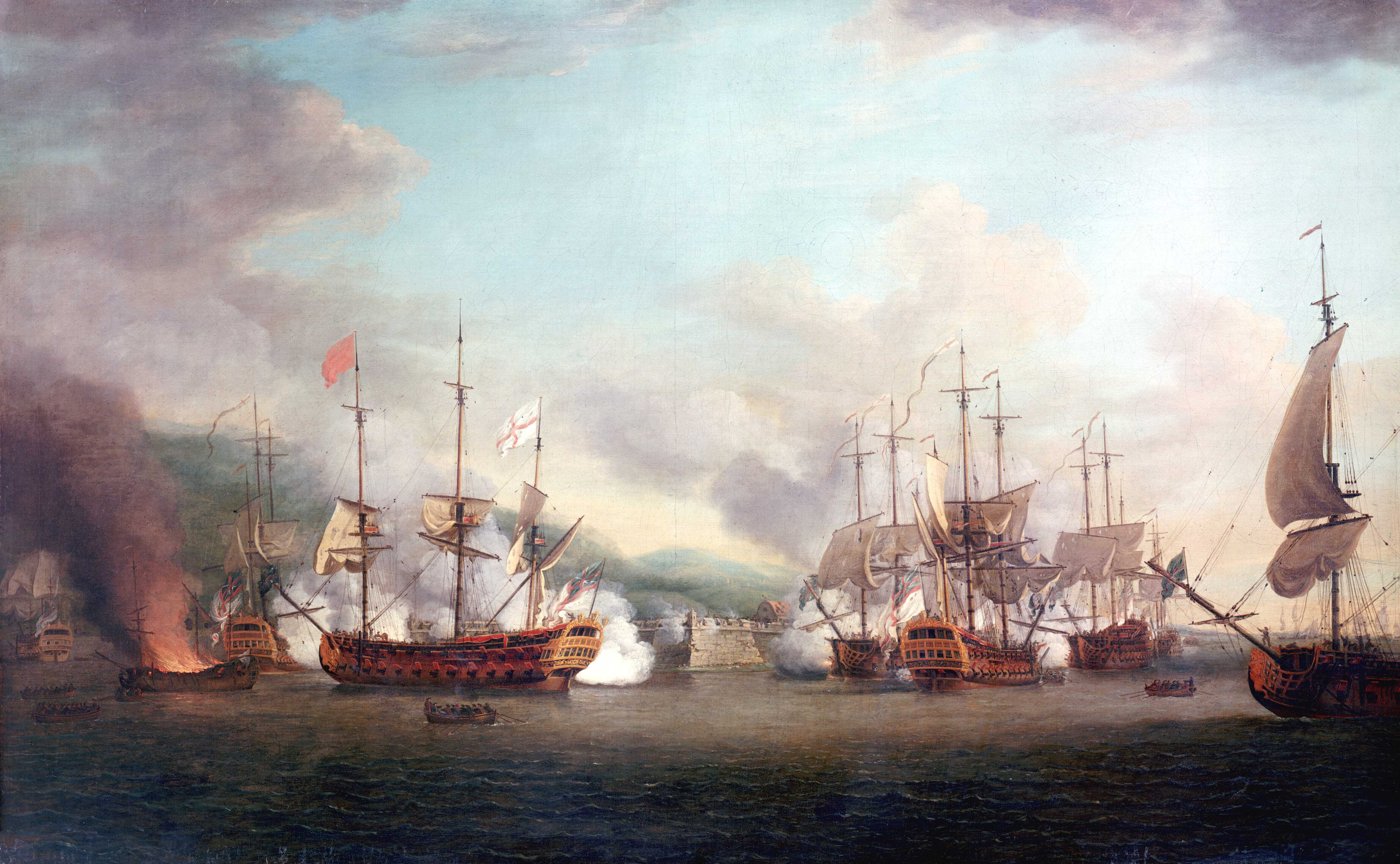
The Capture of Port Louis, Cuba, 8 March 1748 (Date unknown)

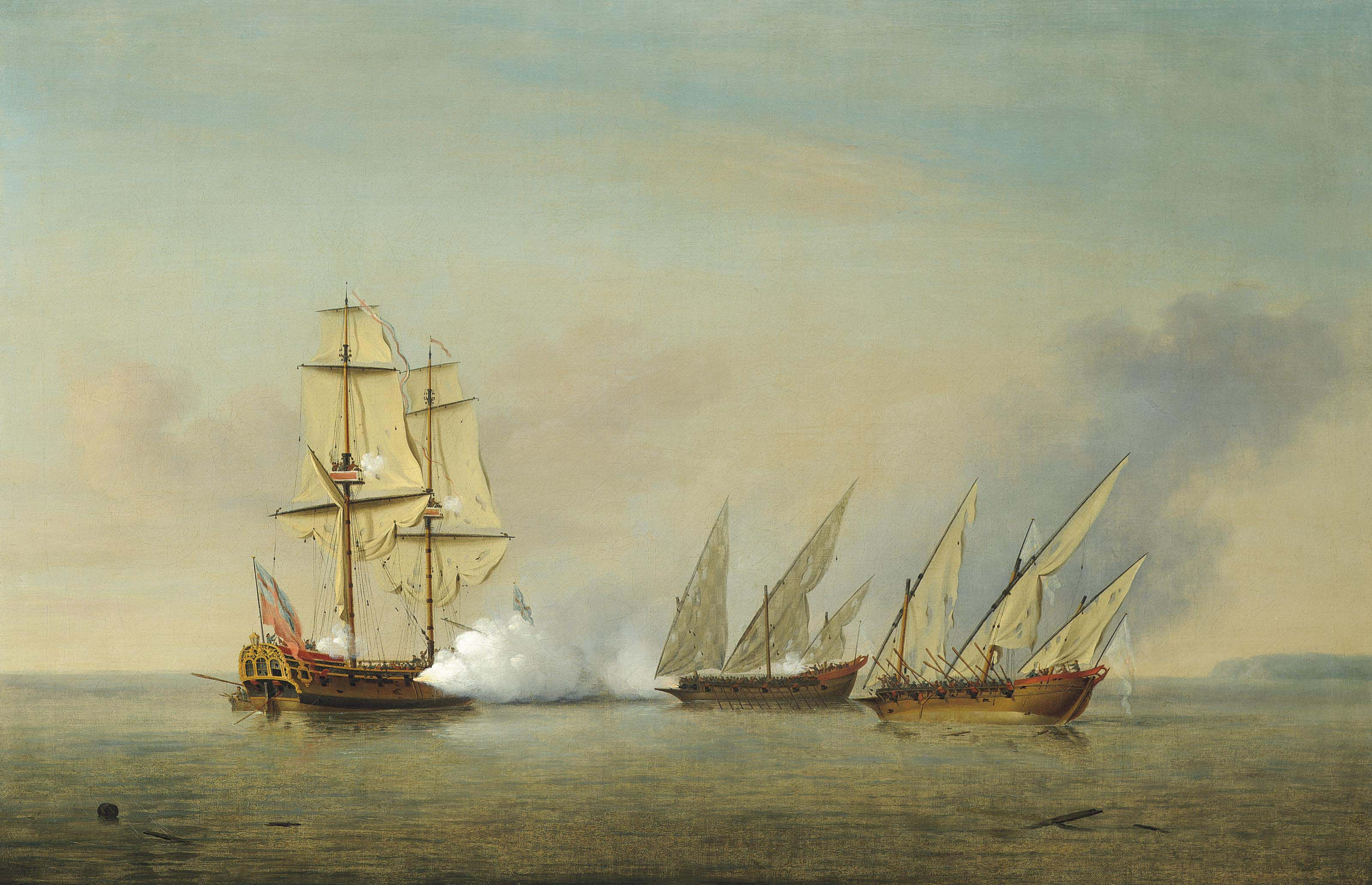
A Royal Navy sloop, H.M.S. Greyhound, in action with two heavily-armed Spanish galleys (Date unknown)

The Battle of Quiberon Bay, 20 November 1759 (Date unknown)

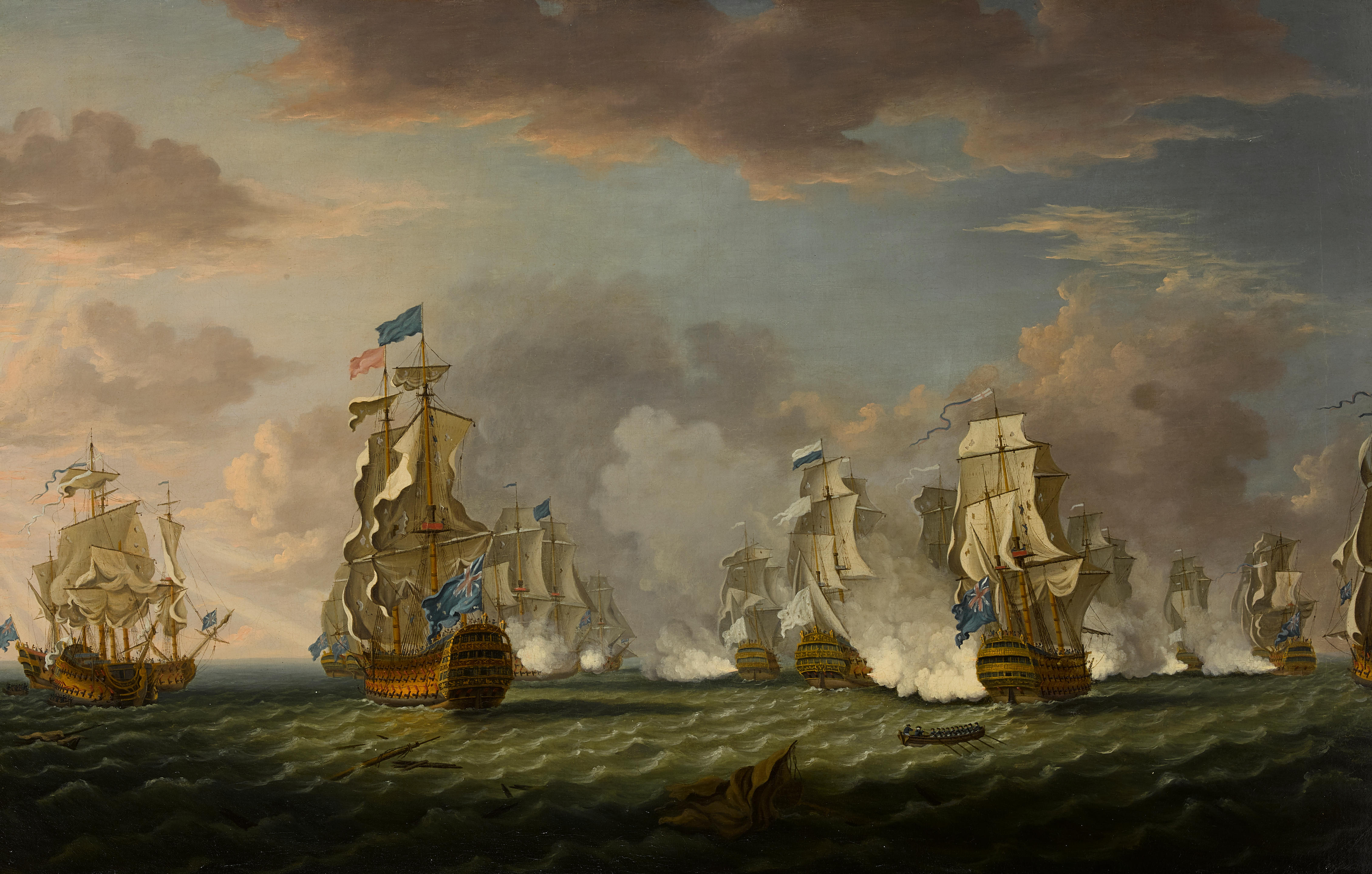
The battle off Lagos, August 18, 1759 (1760)

Bombardment of the Morro Castle, Havana, 1 July 1762 (Date unknown)

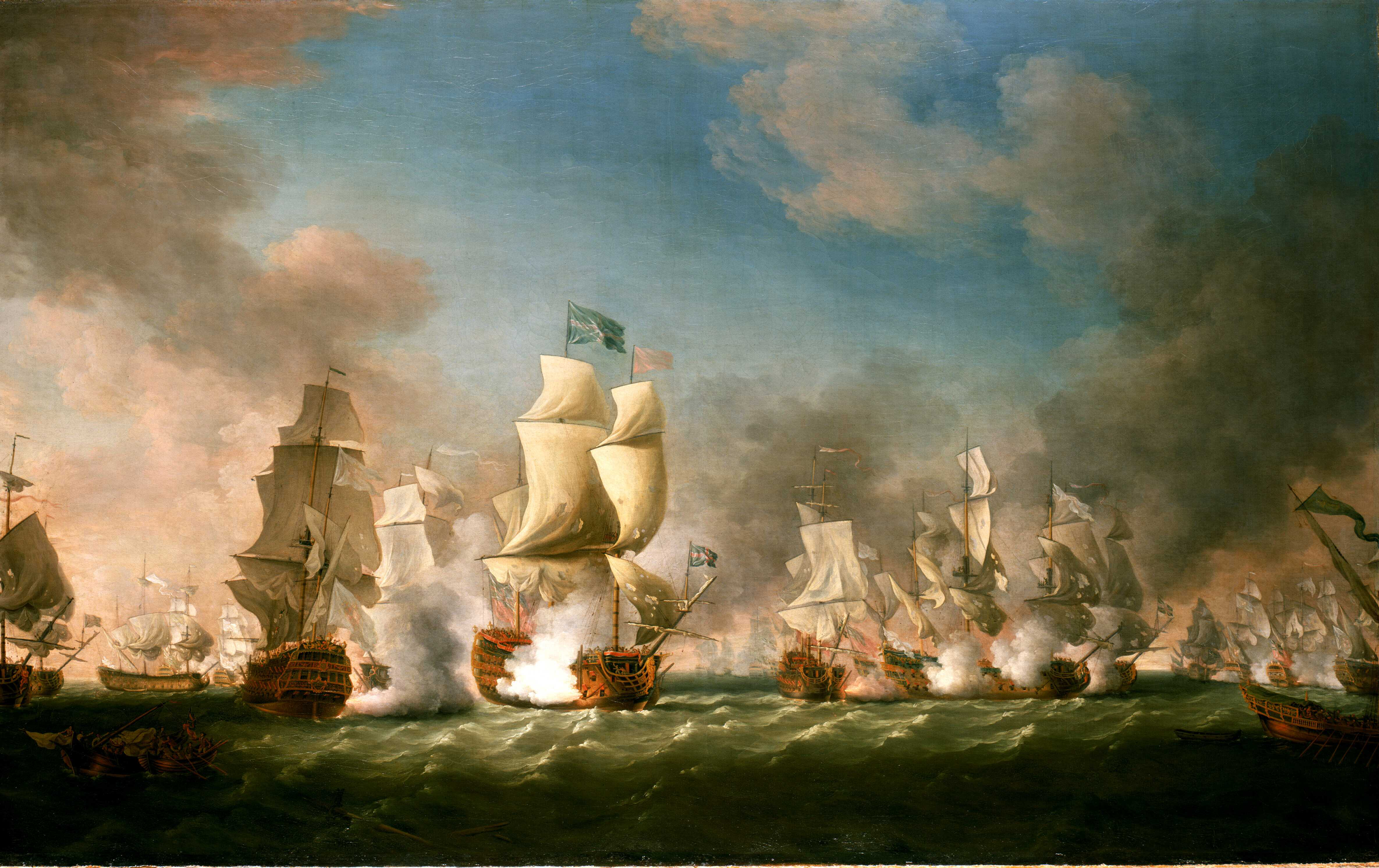
The Battle of Cape Passaro, 11 August 1718 (1767)

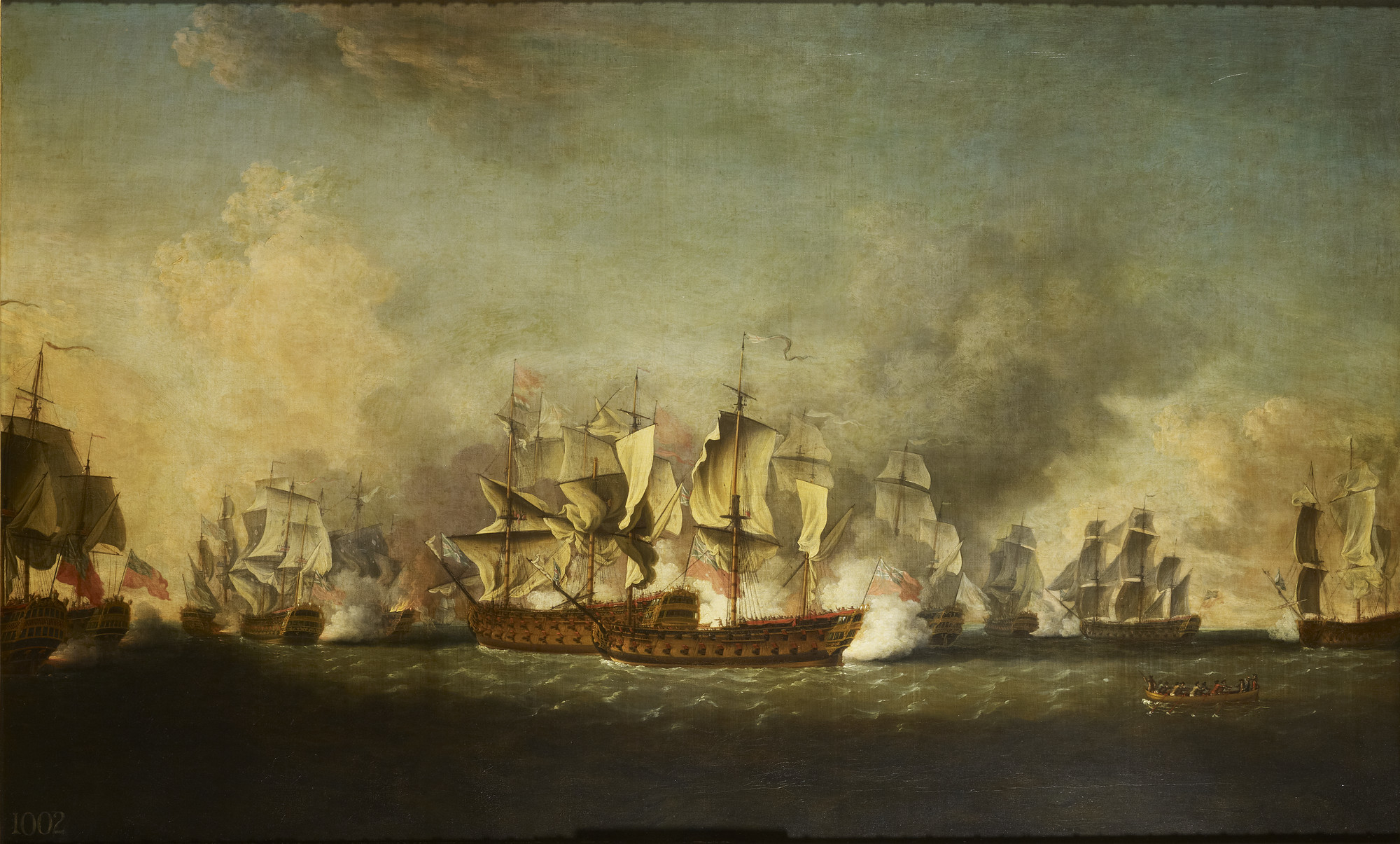
Sir Charles Knowles's Engagement with the Spanish Fleet off Havana (1770)

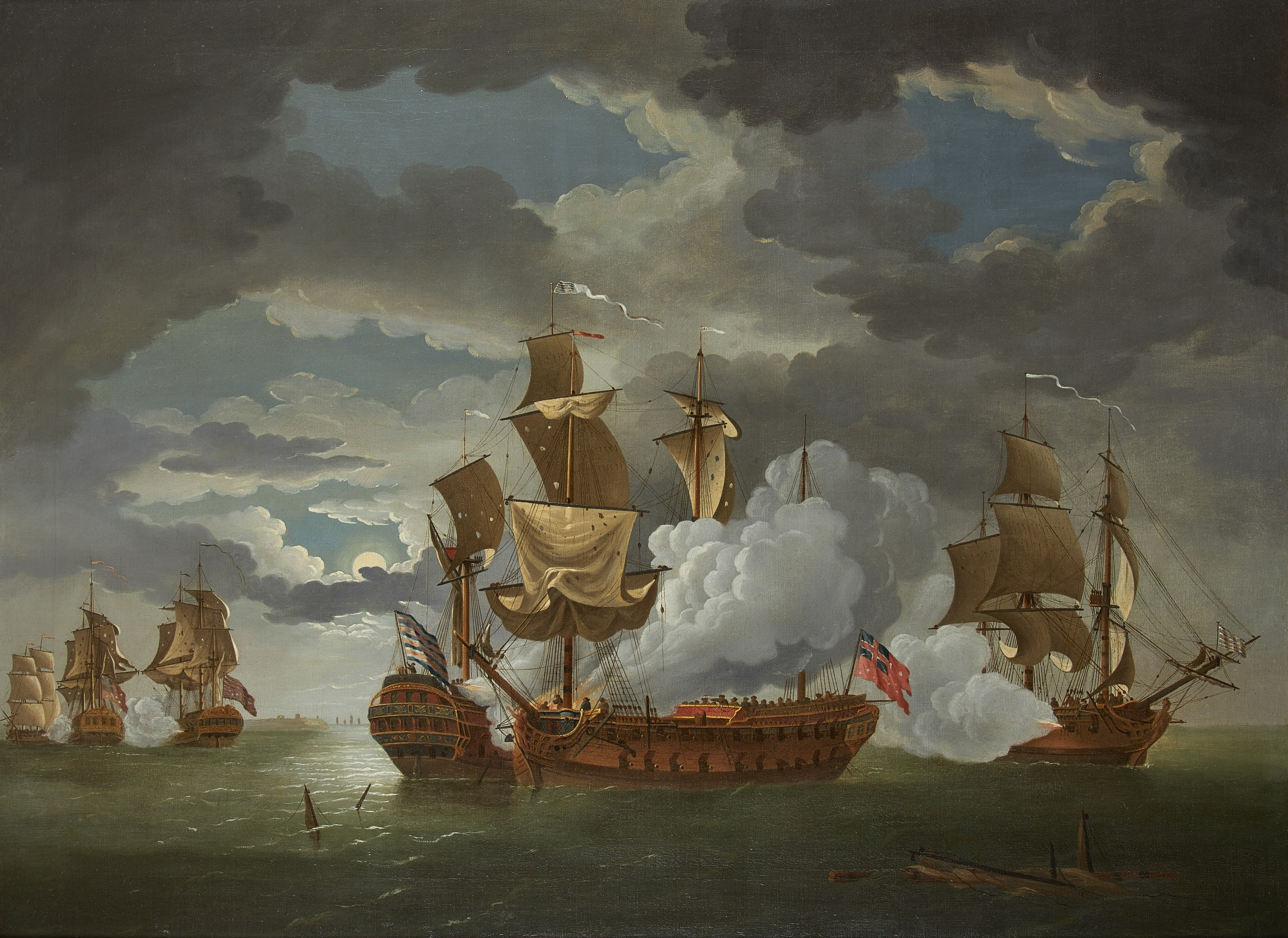
The action between the Serapis, capt. Pearson, the Countess of Scarborough, and Paul Jones’s Squadron, 1780

The Moonlight Battle off Cape St Vincent, 16 January 1780 (c. 1782)

Relief of Gibraltar by Earl Howe, 11 October 1782 (c. 1783)

== See also ==
- List of British painters
- List of people from London
