= John Paul Jones (film) =

1959 film by John Farrow

- Film poster
- Directed by: John Farrow
- Written by: John Farrow; Jesse Lasky Jr. Ben Hecht
- Based on: Nor'wester by Clements Ripley
- Produced by: Samuel Bronston
- Starring: Robert Stack; Marisa Pavan
- Cinematography: Michel Kelber
- Edited by: Eda Warren
- Music by: Max Steiner
- Production companies: Samuel Bronston Productions; Suevia Films-Cesáreo González
- Distributed by: Warner Bros. Pictures
- Release date: June 16, 1959
- Running time: 126 mins
- Countries: United States; Spain
- Languages: English; French
- Budget: $4–5 million
- Box office: $1 million (est. US/Canada rentals)

John Paul Jones is a 1959 biographical adventure film from Warner Bros. Pictures, filmed in the Technirama process, about the American Revolutionary War naval hero. The film, shot in Denia, Spain, was produced by Samuel Bronston and directed by John Farrow, from a screenplay by John Farrow, Ben Hecht, and Jesse Lasky Jr. The film is based on the story Nor'wester by Clements Ripley. The music score was by Max Steiner and the cinematography was by Michel Kelber. It was the final film directed by Farrow.

The film stars Robert Stack (in the title role), Marisa Pavan, Charles Coburn, Macdonald Carey, Jean-Pierre Aumont, David Farrar, Peter Cushing, Basil Sydney, and Thomas Gomez. The director's daughter and son Mia Farrow and John Charles Farrow also make their feature film debuts. Bette Davis made a cameo appearance as Empress Catherine the Great.

== Plot ==
A United States Navy officer recounts the life of John Paul Jones to new midshipmen at the United States Naval Academy. In 1759, a young John Paul undergoes an apprenticeship on board a merchantman, serving on several ships and becoming the master of his own ship by 1773. In Tobago, a mutinous subordinate challenges Paul, who kills him; the governor of Tobago, not wanting him arrested, advises Paul to go to Virginia, where his brother lives. Paul agrees, changing his name to "John Paul Jones" to disguise himself. After arriving in Fredericksburg, Jones finds his brother has recently dead and left his estate, including two slaves Scipio and Cato, to him. As Jones is opposed to slavery, he frees the duo, who continue to work for him. Jones also retains the services of his brother's attorney Patrick Henry. Jones shares Henry's hostility towards British rule in the American colonies, but finds himself torn between their friendship and his romantic feelings for Henry's love interest Dorothea. The will of Jones' brother required him to settle down as a father, but Jones finds himself ill-suited for the profession, and having been rejected by Dorothea's father for her hand in marriage decide to return to sea.

The American Revolutionary War begins, and Jones is commissioned into the Continental Navy, leading a successful raid of Nassau despite his superiors' misgivings. Reuniting with Scipio and Cato, he goes on a cruise and captures eighteen British ships loaded with valuable supplies. Despite his successes, Jones is denied from further promotions due to his low social status, and goes to Valley Forge to tender his resignation. There, General George Washington points out the desperate circumstances of his troops and persuades Jones to go to France and assist Benjamin Franklin in enlisting them as allies. In France, Jones is feted as a hero and at Franklin's urging takes command of a former Dutch frigate. With the ship, he raids the English coast, attacking the town of Whitehaven but treating its population well. Once again, Jones' success is undercut by political rivalries, and his ship is taken from him. Jones falls in love with French lady-in-waiting Aimee de Telleson, and with Franklin's help they persuade Louis XVI to build a new ship for Jones under the American flag, which is named Bonhomme Richard.

Commanding the ship, he fights against the British frigate Serapis. Though Bonhomme Richard is heavily damaged, Jones continues to fight on, telling British Captain Richard Pearson "I have not yet begun to fight!". Jones and his men overpower Serapis's crew and force Pearson to surrender even as Jones' own ship sinks. Taking command of Serapis, Jones returns to France, where he is unable to pursue his romance with Aimee due against to his low social status. When the Revolutionary War ends in 1783, Jones' career comes to an end due to the disbandment of the Continental Navy. He proceeds to join the Imperial Russian Navy after responding to a request from Catherine the Great. Surrounded by sycophantic nobles, Catherine tests Jones' resolve and finds him withstanding the temptations of court life. She gives him command of the Black Sea Fleet, which Jones leads to victory over the Ottoman Navy during the Russo-Turkish War. Given a title of nobility, Jones returns to Paris and reunites with Aimee, but becomes seriously ill; as he lies dying, Aimee writes down a letter Jones composes listing the qualities that naval officers should have. The final scene returns 1959 at the U.S. Naval Academy, where the narrating officer concludes with remarks about Jones' legacy.

== Cast ==
- Robert Stack as John Paul Jones
- Marisa Pavan as Aimée de Tellison
- Charles Coburn as Benjamin Franklin
- Erin O'Brien as Dorothea Danders
- Macdonald Carey as Patrick Henry
- Judson Laire as Mr. Danders
- Bette Davis as Empress of Russia Catherine the Great
- Jean-Pierre Aumont as King of France Louis XVI
- David Farrar as John Wilkes
- Peter Cushing as Captain Pearson
- Susana Canales as Marie Antoinette, Queen of France
- Georges Rivière as Russian Chamberlain
- Tom Brannum as Peter Wooley
- Bruce Cabot as Gunner Lowrie
- Basil Sydney as Sir William Young
- John Crawford as George Washington
- Archie Duncan as Duncan MacBean
- Thomas Gomez as Esek Hopkins
- Bob Cunningham as Lt. Wallingford
- John Charles Farrow as John Paul
- Eric Pohlmann as King of Great Britain and Ireland George III
- Frank Latimore as Lt. Richard Dale
- Ford Rainey as Lt. Simpson

== Production ==
=== Development ===
During the 1930s, numerous American film studios attempted to make biopics about John Paul Jones, but abandoned their projects due to the heavy cost and long length of the projects. In March 1939, Warner Bros. Pictures had purchased the screen rights to Clements Ripley's biographical novel about John Paul Jones, with Aeneas MacKenzie hired to write the script. James Cagney was attached to portray the title role, with Michael Curtiz directing and William Cagney producing. Cagney was later replaced as producer with Lou Edelman. In November of the same year, the project was postponed, with Cagney instead starring in City for Conquest (1940).

In 1946, independent producer Samuel Bronston announced that he had obtained the cooperation of the U.S. Navy for the making of his own biopic of John Paul Jones. It took Bronston nine years to eventually find the financing for the project. In December 1955, Bronston announced that he had formed Admiralty Pictures Corporation, consisting of a group of New York investors, and that they had made a deal with Warner Bros. to produce their long dormant Call to Action project. Bronson hired Jesse Lasky Jr. to writing the script and Bronston wanted John Wayne to star. Bronston's studio received investment from numerous American entrepreneurs and corporations including the Rockefeller family, the Dana family, the Du Pont family, the Stern family, Ernest A. Gross, General Motors, Firestone Tire and Rubber Company, Time Inc., and Eastman Kodak so that they could retrieve funds frozen from sales in Europe. In January 1956, Bronston stated that Admiral Chester Nimitz would act as his personal adviser on the film, in which production was to begin in May of that year.

In 1956, Lasky completed the script with consultation from U.S. Navy officials. In May 1956, Bronston announced that Glenn Ford had accepted the title role. Later, in July, William Dieterle had signed to direct the project, in which filming was scheduled for August. Dieterle favored Richard Todd and Richard Basehart for the role of Jones and John Miljan for George Washington, and hired Ben Hecht to write a new version of the script. By September, Basehart had been cast after Bronston had screen tested 38 actors for the title role. The film would be shot in Warner Bros.' studio and off the Italian coast.

In October 1956, Bronston signed a contract to shoot the feature in the Todd-AO process. However, production was pushed back as Warner Bros. had withdrawn from the project. In October 1957, John Farrow had signed on to direct the film with shooting being re-located to Spain. Bronston had Uruguayan Jaime Prades as his representative in Spain. Admiral Luis Carrero Blanco was the Spanish minister of the presidency and an admirer of Nimitz's. He was convinced to supply Spanish Navy personnel as extras. Farrow liked Lasky's script but rewrote it himself since he was unavailable to collaborate on further edits. Farrow initially received sole credit for writing but ultimately shared it with Lasky after he complained to the Writers Guild of America. Two months later, it was reported that the Navy re-affirmed its full cooperation and that Warner Bros. had re-signed on as the distributor. In February 1958, Robert Stack would play the title role. The film was financed in part through using frozen assets in Spain.

=== Filming ===
Filming started January 1958 in France and ended in August in Spain. There were 107 speaking parts and a shooting schedule of 92 days. Most of the unit was based at Denia. The Spanish government allowed filming at the throne room of the Royal Palace in Madrid. There were also scenes shot in Scotland and Ostia.

== Reception ==
Bosley Crowther of The New York Times wrote the film was "an unexciting picture, so far as dramatic action is concerned, and utterly unexpressive of the recorded nature and character of John Paul Jones." He was dismissive of Stack's performance noting his portrayal was "as though he were a slightly dull but talkative member of a conservative gentleman's club". James Powers of Variety was similarly critical, noting the film "could be shortened drastically and tightened to give it better pace and emphasis. The strong portions would then show to better advantage and eliminate the drag of unnecessary plotting." Powers also felt the depicted historical figures "tended to be stiff or unbelievable" because the film "doesn't get much fire-power into the characters. They end, as they begin, as historical personages rather than human being." Harrison's Reports wrote the film "is excellent from the production point of view. It is, however, only moderately satisfying as an entertainment, for it is handicapped by a script that is something less than inspiring."

The film was a box office failure, losing $5 million. Bronston, however, managed to raise financing from many of the same investors, notably Pierre S. du Pont III, for his later features.

== Legacy ==
Musician John Paul Jones (born John Baldwin), best known as the bassist of English rock band Led Zeppelin, took his stage name at the suggestion of Andrew Loog Oldham, who had seen the film's poster.

Despite the financial failure of John Paul Jones, Bronston continued to produce a number of historical epic films, in which he had established Spain as a major production center in filmmaking. However, Bronston would file for Chapter 11 bankruptcy in June 1964 following another financial failure with The Fall of the Roman Empire.

== Comic book adaptation ==
- Dell Four Color #1007 (September 1959) The Dell comic was drawn by Dan Spiegle.

== See also ==
- List of films about the American Revolution
- List of television series and miniseries about the American Revolution

== Bibliography ==
- Pencak, William (2010). Pennsylvania's Revolution. Pennsylvania State University Press. ISBN 978-0-27-103580-2.
- Thompson, Gordon (2008). Please Please Me: Sixties British Pop, Inside Out. Oxford University Press. ISBN 978-0-19-533325-1.
- Vansittart, Peter (2004). John Paul Jones: A Restless Spirit. Robson Books. ISBN 978-1-86-105621-4.
