= Battle of Flamborough Head =

1779 Naval battle

Coordinates: 54°09′45″N 0°07′10″W

- Part of the American Revolutionary War
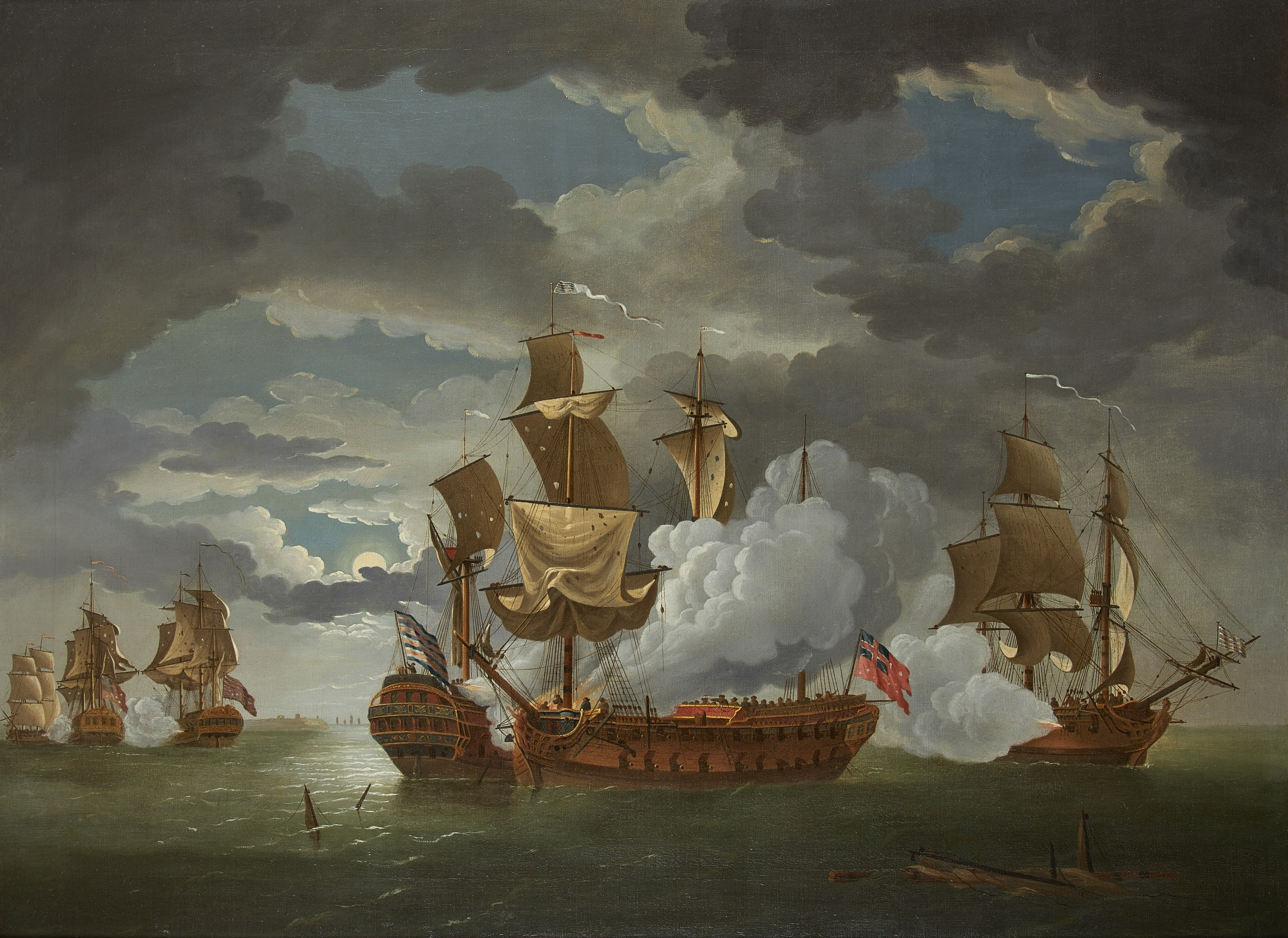
- Defence of Captn Pearson in his Majesty’s Ship Serapis and the Countess of Scarborough Arm’d Ship Captn Piercy, against Paul Jones's Squadron, 23 September 1779 by painter Richard Paton, 1780
Date	23 September 1779
Location	off Flamborough Head, Yorkshire, England, North Sea
Result	See aftermath

Belligerents
United States; France	Great Britain

Commanders and leaders
John Paul Jones	(Kingdom of Great Britain) Richard Pearson

Strength
1 ship, 2 frigates, 1 brigantine, 1 schooner	1 5th rate, 1 sloop-of-war

Casualties and losses
~170 killed or wounded 1 ship sunk	>117 killed or wounded, survivors captured 2 ships captured

The Battle of Flamborough Head was a naval battle that took place on 23 September 1779 in the North Sea off the coast of Yorkshire, between a combined Franco-American squadron, led by Continental Navy officer John Paul Jones and two British escort vessels protecting a large merchant convoy. It became one of the most celebrated naval actions of the war in America, despite its relatively small size and a considerable dispute over what had actually occurred.

== Franco-American squadron ==
On 14 August 1779 a squadron of seven ships departed Groix, off L’Orient in France, nominally under the command of American Continental Navy Captain John Paul Jones. The squadron voyaged from a brief stop off Ireland, round the north of Scotland, and down the east coast of Britain, creating havoc wherever possible. Although sailing under the American flag, all the vessels were loaned or donated by France, with French captains, except for the Alliance, which had been built in Amesbury, Massachusetts, specifically for the Continental Navy (although it had an originally French captain too: Pierre Landais). The crews included Americans, French volunteers, British sailors previously captured by the Americans and offered the chance to get out of captivity, and many others seeking glory or prize money. By mid-September, four of the ships remained in the squadron.

On the evening of 22 September, Jones in Bonhomme Richard (an armed former French East India Company trading vessel he had reluctantly adapted for military use), accompanied by the little brigantine Vengeance under Captain Philippe Nicolas Ricot, had been off Spurn Head, hoping to catch a few prizes emerging from the Humber estuary, but he decided to head northward during the night and rendezvous with his frigates Alliance and Pallas, which had parted company from him further up the coast. Shortly after midnight, two vessels were seen, so signal lanterns were set. The strangers did not give the response that would identify them as members of his squadron. Jones's crew was called to quarters, but when daylight approached, about 5:30 am, and a chequered flag was hoisted on the mizzen mast, the mystery vessels finally identified themselves as the Alliance and Pallas. Captain Denis Nicolas Cottineau de Kerloguen of the Pallas later reported that Captain Pierre Landais of the Alliance had advised a rapid retreat if the approaching warship proved to be British—not a reassuring suggestion, given that his frigate, which had been acclaimed as the best warship yet made in America, was by a fair margin the faster and more manoeuvrable of the two.

Early in the afternoon, the reunited squadron sighted a brig in Bridlington Bay, so at about 3:30 pm, a small schooner, captured the previous day, was sent with a 15-man boarding party. There is a discrepancy at this point between Jones's official report and Bonhomme Richard’s log, but the reason for sending the schooner may have been not because the brig was in very shallow water, but because the main squadron was on its way to investigate a sighting of a ship further north near Flamborough Head. Shortly after the schooner was dispatched, Alliance, which had been somewhat ahead of the others, hoisted a signal and set off at speed. At least two large vessels had been sighted in the distance, so the schooner was immediately recalled by firing a signal gun, and the entire squadron headed towards the potentially rich prizes.

The courses of the opponents up to the moment just before the first sighting, early afternoon, 23 September

== British convoy ==
On 15 September, a convoy of more than 50 ships which had been trading with ports in the Baltic had set sail from a rendezvous off the Norwegian coast at the mouth of the Skagerrak channel to cross the North Sea. Some ships left the convoy before Britain came in sight, heading for northern ports such as Leith and the River Tyne. When the Yorkshire coast was sighted early on 23 September, just over 40 ships remained, mostly carrying iron or timber (often in the form of planks and masts for ships), bound for ports along the southern half of the British Isles. Although the Baltic convoy had received a warning from Scarborough that an enemy squadron was in the vicinity, some ships ignored the signals (by both flags and guns) from the 44-gun escort ship HMS Serapis to stay close for protection.

Early in the afternoon, as they approached Flamborough Head, the lookouts of the foremost ships saw the danger in Bridlington Bay for themselves. Hastily tacking, they attempted to run for the safety of Scarborough. Serapis put on all sail to get between the fleeing merchant vessels and a potential attack, while the smaller Countess of Scarborough (a hired armed ship built by private subscription and hired to the Admiralty for escort duty) shepherded the convoy. About 4 pm, with the whole convoy to his north and the squadron clearly in sight to the south, Captain Richard Pearson of the Serapis signalled Countess of Scarborough to join him. As the squadron caught up, the Royal Navy vessels made sure to position themselves so that the presumed enemy could not easily sail round them to reach the slower merchant ships.

== First shots ==
As the situation became clear, Alliance gradually slowed, allowing the rest of Jones's squadron to catch up (except for the little schooner carrying the boarding party, which could not sail fast enough). About 6 pm, Jones ordered Pallas to ride directly in his wake to confuse the opposition about the squadron's strength, and half an hour later he hoisted signals ordering all vessels to form a single-file line of battle, to make best use of their broadsides as they passed the two British ships. Captain Landais, who unlike Jones had a great deal of formal training in naval leadership and tactics (and was aware of the latest French battle plans, used with considerable success against the Royal Navy at this time), decided to try a different plan. He used Alliance's superior handling to sail off to one side, against the wind. In order to prevent him from sailing right past and chasing the convoy, Captain Thomas Piercy of the Countess of Scarborough had to do the same, leaving Serapis alone against the remaining three American ships.

Around 7 pm, Bonhomme Richard was within pistol-shot of the battle-ready Serapis. In the gathering dark, Pearson hailed the potentially hostile ship to ask some pertinent questions: its name, its nationality etc. The answer was a few evasive remarks, followed by a shot (as he recalled it, but possibly a broadside) which Serapis answered with a broadside. A minute or two later, as soon as he was within range, Landais fired his own broadside at the Countess of Scarborough (theoretically just over 200 pounds (91 kg) of shot from 18 guns). Piercy soon replied (his maximum broadside being about 60 lb from 10 guns).

Bonhomme Richard was about the same length as Alliance and originally had almost the same armament, with a broadside of just over 200 pounds (91 kg) from 18 guns, but Jones had been able to add six second-hand 18-pound guns, mounted in such a way that they could be rotated to fire through ports low down on either side, adding 108 pounds (49 kg) of shot to a full broadside. In the event, though, these big guns only fired eight shots between them, because two of them quickly burst open under the strain, killing most of the people around them, so the remainder were abandoned. Serapis, one of the Royal Navy's newest ships, also had 18-pound guns (10 on each side, contributing 180 pounds (82 kg) to a total 22-gun broadside of around 280 pounds (130 kg) which were in good condition. Additionally, being designed as a warship, Serapis was more manoeuvrable than the Bonhomme Richard. By coincidence, due to desertions and the need to crew captured vessels, Bonhomme Richard's crew had been reduced from around 400 to about the same as Serapis, 320.

== First half-hour ==
While Jones and Landais were fighting their unexpectedly separate battles, Captains Cottineau of the Pallas and Ricot of Vengeance were left wondering what to do. In a well-organised formation, they might have been able to make a contribution, but to intervene in a ship-to-ship duel would be very dangerous. In theory, they could have taken advantage of the confusion to sail off after the stragglers of the convoy, but night had now fallen, and until the moon rose, they would not be able to see their prey. Also, it quickly became clear that Bonhomme Richard would need help. Therefore, they waited until they could be useful. About this time, the little schooner caught up with them, but there was no way to transfer the potentially very useful boarding team to Bonhomme Richard or Alliance.

Jones realized that if he could not use the 18-pounders, he could not win a gun fight, so he quickly adopted a policy of trying to grapple and board his opponent. Pearson’s crew spotted the change and adapted rapidly, using the superior maneuverability of Serapis to keep out of reach, while continuing to bombard the slower ship. On one occasion though, according to the later recollection of First Lieutenant Richard Dale, Bonhomme Richard's bow ran into Serapis' stern and, with neither side able to take advantage of the situation, Pearson cheekily asked the punning question, "Has your ship struck?" Dale reports Jones's reply as, "I have not yet begun to fight!"

Meanwhile, after two or three broadsides exchanged with Alliance, less than 20 minutes after the first shot, Piercy was astonished to see his opponent (with just one of the little 6 pounds (2.7 kg) shots from the Countess of Scarborough stuck in its tough timberwork) move away to rejoin Pallas, which was still waiting for an opportunity to be useful. Landais later claimed that his opponent had sailed away under cover of smoke. Piercy, his ship relatively unharmed and out of range of any of the four Americans, headed straight for the main battle to see if he could help Serapis, but Jones's close-quarters policy meant that to intervene now would be madness. Quite possibly shots fired by the Countess of Scarborough at the Bonhomme Richard would hit Serapis, or worse still, massive 18 pounds (8.2 kg) shots from Serapis could accidentally hit the Countess of Scarborough. Instead, Piercy simply gave the impression that he was going to intervene, trying to attract the attention of Alliance and Pallas. Cottineau saw the potential danger (or responded to a request by Landais) and quickly steered towards the Countess of Scarborough, so Piercy slowly retreated, sailing with the wind.

== Two gunnery duels ==
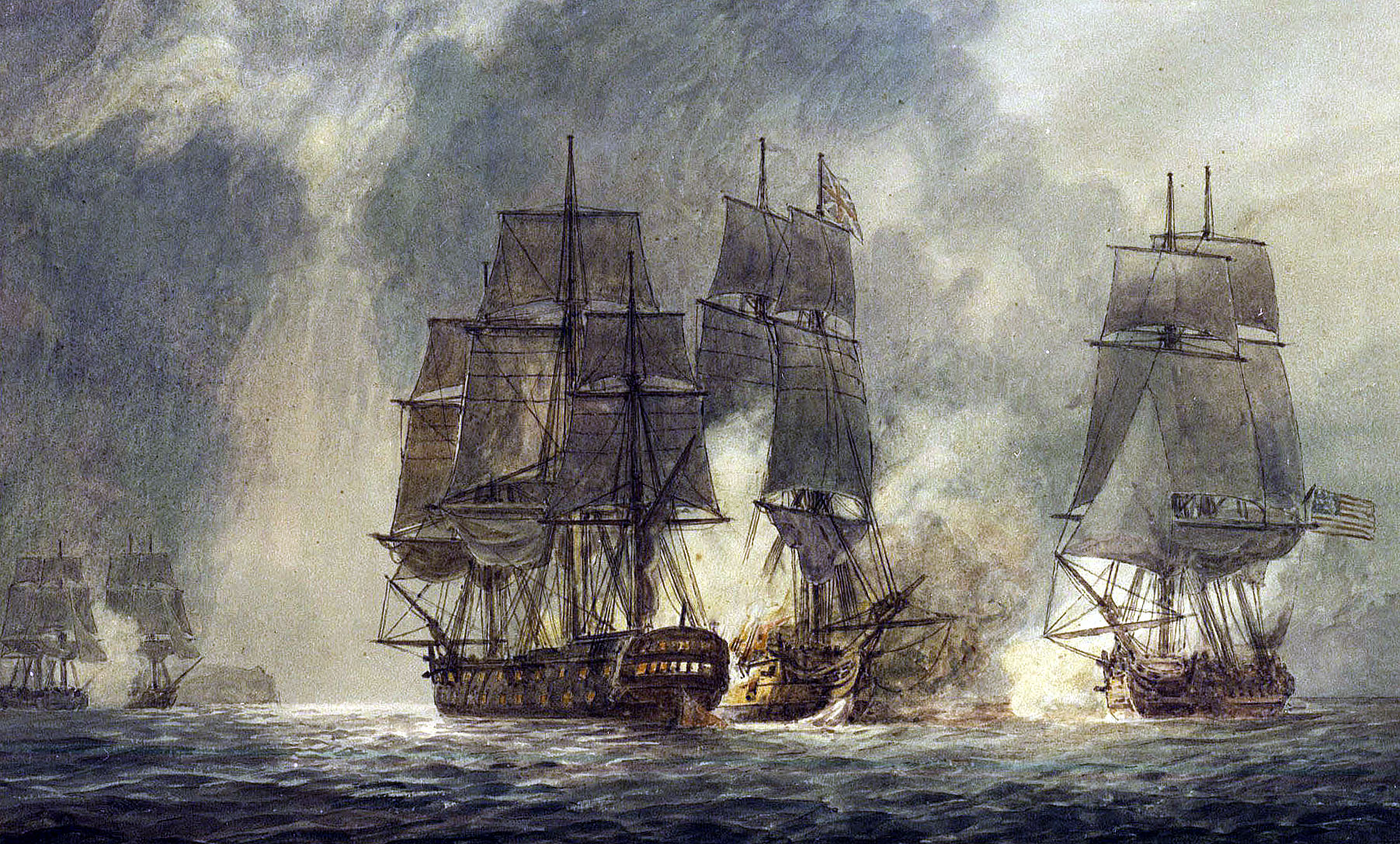
Frigates Bonhomme Richard and Alliance vs HMS Serapis, 23 September 1779

Shortly afterwards, Jones got the opportunity he had been striving for—not a moment too soon, as his ship had been holed below the waterline and was becoming increasingly unresponsive. Serapis' jib-boom caught in the rigging of Bonhomme Richard's mizzen mast, and Jones immediately led his crew in attaching the two ships together as strongly as they could. Seeing the danger, Pearson dropped anchor. Because both ships were under sail, when Serapis came to an abrupt halt, Bonhomme Richard would keep going and with luck, tear free. Jones’ men had been very efficient, so what actually happened was that Bonhomme Richard's motion was turned into a rotation, and the two ships, still firmly attached, ended up side by side, facing in opposite directions, their great guns touching each other’s hull planks. Better still for Jones, Serapis' spare anchor caught in the woodwork of Bonhomme Richard's stern, locking the two ships in that extraordinary position. Pearson fired broadsides straight into Bonhomme Richard's hull, tearing huge holes in its side and damaging the gun decks. For Jones's boarding plan to succeed, he needed to drive all the Royal Navy sailors from Serapis' deck before his ship was destroyed beneath him. He had prepared well for such an eventuality, and his men at stations up the masts were equipped both with small guns and with incendiary grenades. Three 9-pound guns on the quarterdeck (the rear part of the upper deck) were still usable, although one was on the wrong side and had to be dragged around. Two of these guns were loaded with anti-personnel grapeshot to help drive Pearson's men from the deck, but the third was used with solid bar-shot aimed at Serapis' mainmast.

By this time, towards 8:30 pm, the moon had risen. Moving slowly downwind away from the anchored ships, Pallas and Countess of Scarborough began a second battle of broadsides (which for Pallas meant 16 guns firing just over 130 pounds (59 kg) of shot together). Hovering in the background were Vengeance and the schooner, with the boarding party which Jones really needed. After observing for a time, Landais formed another plan and set off after Pallas. On the way, Alliance passed the two locked ships, still anchored, still firing broadsides at each other. As the direction of shots was now predictable, Landais could safely approach within firing range of Serapis, from the right direction- bow or stern rather than flank. This he did, firing a broadside including round-shot, bar-shot and grapeshot at Serapis' bow. Right next to that bow was Bonhomme Richard's stern. As much lethal shot hit Jones's men as Pearson’s, and metal also flew along Bonhomme Richard's gun deck, killing some of the remaining gunners and wrecking several gun-carriages. Landais then continued on his way.

Bonhomme Richard started definitively losing the battle. According to Jones's published campaign report, around 9:30 pm grenade-thrower William Hamilton ventured out along a yard-arm until he could look almost straight down on the deck of Serapis (by this time, almost cleared of men) and began trying to drop grenades down the hatches. One of these ignited a charge of gunpowder placed in readiness (contrary to standard fire safety practice, but Captain Pearson had encouraged his men to "fire briskly") for loading into one of Serapis' 18-pound guns. The problem with this version of the story is that the 18-pounders were on the lower deck, so it would take a very lucky drop to reach them from high above. Pearson speculated that either a grenade had been thrown through a hole in the hull from Bonhomme Richard's gun deck, or that the charge had been ignited by accident. Whatever the cause, the effect was devastating. As the ignited charge blew up, it scattered burning gunpowder, setting off other charges nearby, and ultimately the chain reaction covered the entire rear half of Serapis' lower gun deck, killing or severely burning many of the gunnery crewmen, forcing some to leap into the sea to extinguish their burning clothes and putting five guns out of action. In the confusion, some of the crew clambering back on board after jumping into the sea were nearly mistaken for American boarders.

Still in action, still moving with the wind away from the main fight, were Pallas and the Countess of Scarborough. Alliance was catching up fast, and as the near-undamaged, speedy, well-armed frigate approached, Piercy understood that with seven of his own guns dismounted, four of his crew dead, twenty wounded, his rigging and sails too badly damaged to make a speedy getaway, he could neither win nor escape. With Landais hovering just beyond the range of his guns, he therefore struck his colours. Alliance approached him, seeking to take the formal surrender, but after brief exchanges with both Piercy and Cottineau, Landais accepted that his colleague should take the surrender and attend to casualties, while Alliance returned to the main battle. Because the return journey would be against the wind, take a while, as Piercy presumably intended.

== Jones vs. Pearson (plus Landais) ==
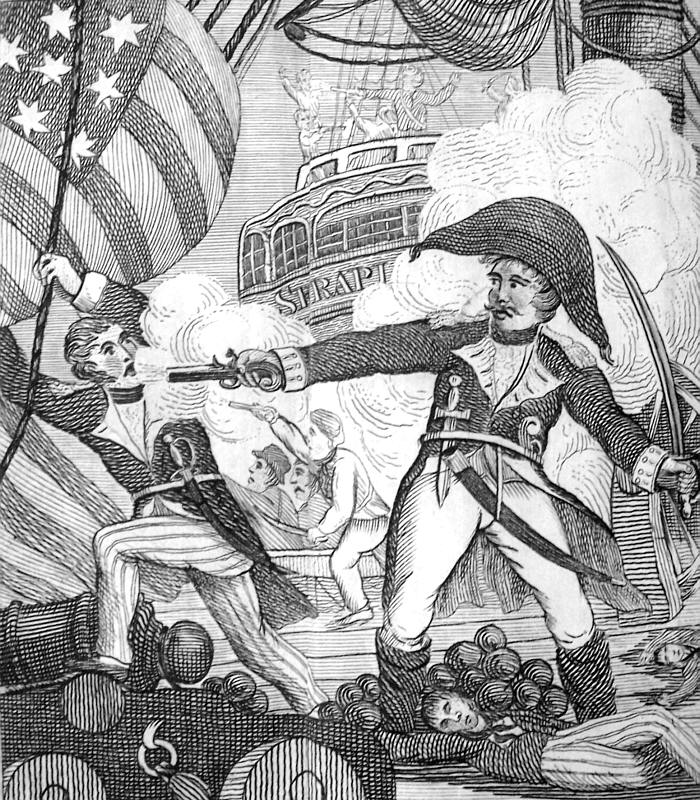
"Paul Jones, shooting Lieut. Grubb, for attempting to strike the Colours", from "The Life and History of PAUL JONES, the English Corsair", c1820

The absence of any other combatants had bought Serapis a considerable amount of time. Bonhomme Richard's gun decks were now so badly damaged that most of the British shots were passing straight through without touching anything, and the great guns were almost completely silenced. There were almost as many fires to be extinguished as there were aboard Serapis, but on the other hand, the hold was filling with water because one of the pumps was in ruins. Jones was exhausted and apparently slumped on the chicken coop for a brief rest. Somehow (according to his later memoirs), a rumour went around that he was dead or dying, and his gunner and carpenter, both wounded, hastily consulted with the master-at-arms. Together they decided, a little before 10 pm, to surrender by striking the ship’s colours, but the flag had already been shot away, so their only option was to shout.

Pearson shouted back, asking whether the Americans had really struck their colours. Possibly his lieutenant of marines relayed this message. Jones's reply was firmly negative. Jones recalled shouting something along the lines of "I have not yet thought of it, but I am determined to make you strike," at which point, presumably, the surrendering officers realised he was still alive and returned to their duties. A much more dramatic version appeared in newspapers within days of the event, allegedly based on the testimony of a crewman who thought he heard something like "I may sink, but I’ll be damned if I strike", and witnessed the captain using his pistols to shoot the three officers who were attempting to surrender (another version of the story circulated, with the chicken coop but without the shootings, which fits better with Jones's memory).

In all the noise, Pearson could not actually hear the reply to his question, so he decided to send a boarding team. At this point, once again, Jones's preparation paid off. The boarders were met by a previously hidden defensive force which swiftly drove them back to Serapis. By this time, the attempts to bring down Serapis' main mast had also borne some fruit (ironically, the only reason why it had not fallen down was because it was leaning on Bonhomme Richard's rigging).

And then, perhaps about 10:15 pm, Alliance returned, and Landais delivered another of his helpful broadsides. Jones's men yelled at him to stop, and the commodore attempted to send orders for Alliance to help with a boarding operation. The moon was full, brightly illuminating the distinctive yellow livery of Serapis. Bonhomme Richard was clearly showing agreed lantern signals, but Landais stuck to his plan, sailing round the "safe" sides of the locked ships to fire broadsides aimed, in his theory, at both bow and stern of Serapis. In reality, Bonhomme Richard, yet again, was holed below the waterline and started settling so rapidly that the master-at-arms took it upon himself to release the hundred or so prisoners from previous captures, who had been held on the lower decks. As they had not been put in manacles, they were completely free and could potentially have helped Serapis' crew to overrun the American ship. Jones reacted quickly to the new crisis, successfully urging the prisoners to put all their efforts into working the three remaining pumps to save their own lives.

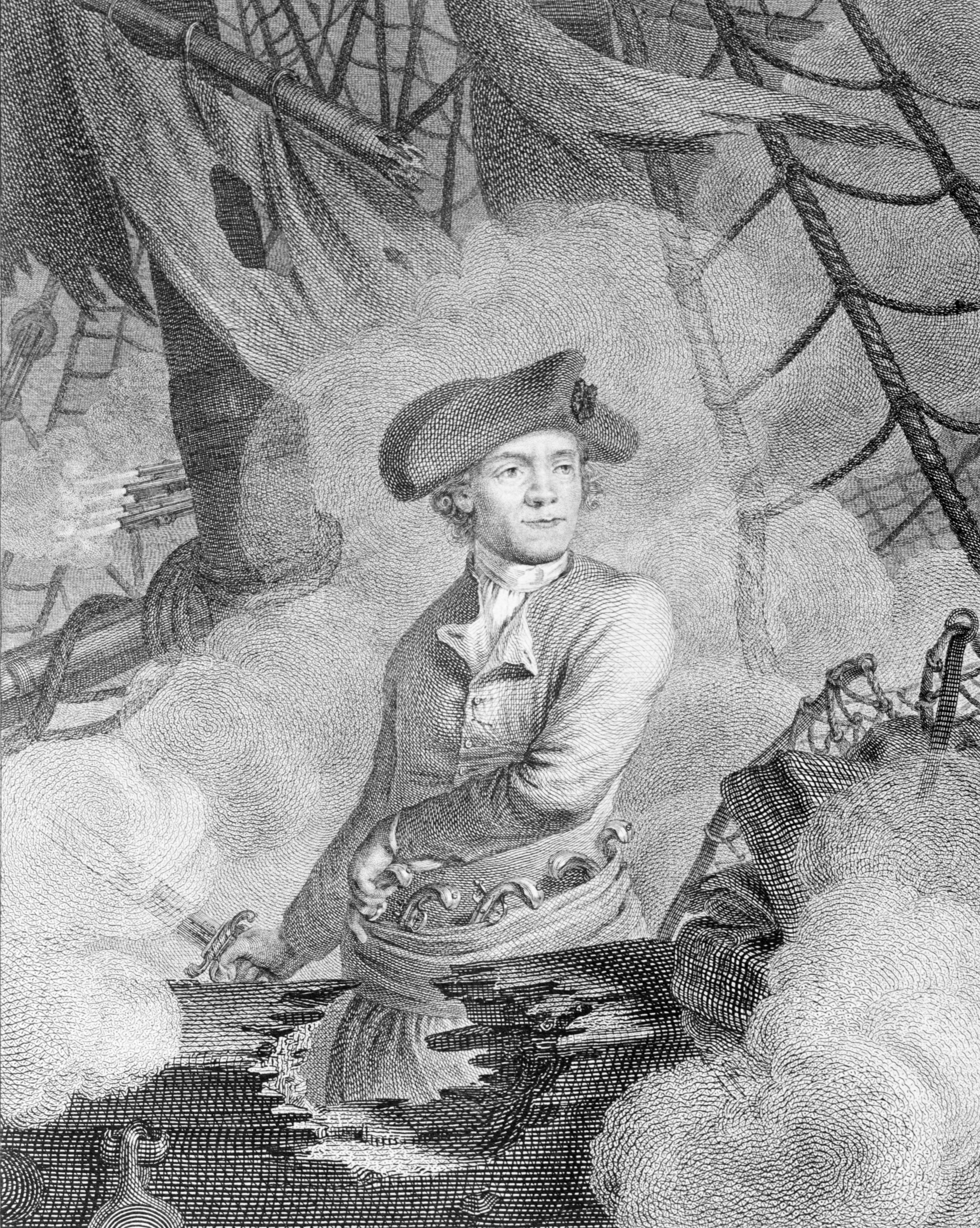
John Paul Jones, from an engraving by c. 1779 after his victory at the Battle of Flamborough Head

Pearson had only limited knowledge of the escalating chaos aboard Bonhomme Richard. He too was losing many men from Alliance's attacks, and he could not move his ship. Alliance, still effectively undamaged, could keep firing at will. On the other hand, nearly every ship in the convoy he had been sent to protect had reached safety before the battle even began. Following a second round of broadsides from Alliance, he decided that he could achieve nothing more by continuing to fight. Not long after 10:30 pm, he called for quarter and struck his colours in person.

Thus the Americans finally got the chance to board the Serapis, but this did not go quite as well as it could have. Three shots were fired by British sailors who had not got the message. Midshipman John Mayrant, following First Lieutenant Dale aboard, got a pike stuck through his leg. Pearson's first lieutenant was among those reluctant to believe that his captain had surrendered, and Dale made sure that he stayed with Pearson rather than leaving him to his own devices. A short time later, as Pearson was boarding Bonhomme Richard to hand over his ceremonial sword, the mainmast of Serapis finally fell overboard, perhaps as a result of work to separate the two ships, dragging the damaged mizzen-top-mast with it. As Bonhomme Richard got under way, Dale attempted to follow in Serapis, and learned two important facts in quick succession. First, Serapis would not move, and second, he had a very large splinter in his leg, which now caused him to fall over. The first problem was rectified by cutting the anchor cable, the second by returning Dale to Bonhomme Richard for treatment. Boats from both Serapis and Alliance were used to begin the evacuation of Bonhomme Richard's crew. One or two of these boats went missing during the night, as ex-captive British crewmen took the opportunity to go home (hence the eyewitness newspaper stories). The combatants had been observed by thousands of onlookers, for on that clear night, with a near-full moon, the action could be seen from a long stretch of the high Yorkshire coastline, from Scarborough in the north to Flamborough Head in the south.

There is no record of final casualty figures aboard the two main combatants. Pearson, in a postscript to his battle report, stated that there were "many more than" 49 dead and 68 wounded aboard Serapis, but his figure of 300 casualties aboard Bonhomme Richard seems very high, unless it includes a great many of the captives stuck below decks during the battle. British press reports claim 70 deaths on Bonhomme Richard, which, assuming a similar ratio to the Serapis figures would give around 100 wounded.

== Aftermath ==
Overnight, pumping continued on Bonhomme Richard, and repairs began (also, the powder was removed from the magazine, which was threatened by the continued smouldering of the ship's woodwork). With the water still getting deeper, the guns from the lower decks were reluctantly heaved overboard—not a very difficult task, as much of the hull was missing. The dead went the same way, though with rather more dignity. At 2 pm the next day, with the carpenter insisting that the ship could not be saved, Jones took Pearson and the lieutenant of Serapis to safety but returned early in the evening to check on progress. Finding that the water was still rising, he ordered the wounded, who ideally should not have been moved, to be transferred to other vessels (Pearson was not aware of this nocturnal operation and wrote in his official report that Jones had left the wounded aboard).

At 10 pm, those who had been brought in from other ships to man the pumps were ordered to leave, and during the rest of the night the most important items aboard were removed. These did not include personal possessions, not even most of Jones's. The flotilla was slowly moving east-southeast away from the coast all this time and was not seen from land again after night fell (as Flamborough Head is about 400 feet (120 m) high, ships’ sails would be visible on a clear day up to 30 miles (48 km) away).

At 4 am the next day, 25 September, pumping was abandoned, with the water almost up to the lower deck. The wind was getting stronger, so all personnel abandoned ship at 10 am, and just before 11, as a boat approached from the commodore's new command ship, Serapis, to try to salvage a few more items, Bonhomme Richard sank.

Jones wished to take his prizes to Dunkirk, but the French captains insisted on following the original orders from their government masters to head for the island of Texel in the neutral United Provinces (the Netherlands). They arrived safely on 3 October, while the British ships searched for them in all the wrong places, having ignored a correct preliminary estimate by observers in Yorkshire. Jones immediately wrote a report to his own government superior, Benjamin Franklin, one notable feature of which was, inevitably, the conduct of Captain Landais. Furious though he was, he wrote, "I forbear to take any steps With him until I have the advice and approbation of your Excellency". Captain Cottineau, on the other hand, placed himself under no such obligation and called Landais a coward to his face. Landais challenged him to a duel during which Landais ran his sword through Cottineau's chest, just missing the heart.

While the ships were being repaired, Jones had to deal with the consequences of landing in a neutral port with prizes of war. He turned on the charm for diplomatic negotiations at The Hague and networking in Amsterdam, where he was the toast of society, known as "The Terror of the English". On 8 October, the British ambassador, Sir Joseph Yorke, wrote to the rulers of the United Provinces, claiming that under international law, Jones, not being accredited by a recognised state, was a rebel and a pirate. Therefore, the two captured ships should be detained for handing back to their rightful owners. Yorke also asked that the wounded from the two ships should be taken ashore and treated at British Government expense. That request was agreed to immediately, but it was over a fortnight later, during which repair work proceeded without any hindrance, when the Dutch replied that their neutrality meant they could not judge the legality of actions between foreigners on the open sea, but that would also apply to any attempt made by the British to retake their ships once they left port. Furthermore, Jones's squadron was obliged to leave the Texel "as soon as possible", and could not be supplied with arms or ammunition except "what are absolutely necessary to carry them safe to the first foreign port they can come at".

Yorke replied by quoting treaties, returning to the "pirate" theme, and pointing out that under Dutch law, commanders of foreign naval forces were obliged to present authorisation from their governments when docking in Dutch ports. As the United Provinces did not officially recognise the government of the United States, that was a tricky legal point which the Dutch took quite a while to consider. To get round the problem, Pallas and Vengeance were declared officially French, and Captain Cottineau became commodore of a French squadron, his flagship the captured Serapis. With Landais barred from command until the case against him could be heard, Jones became captain of the avowedly American Alliance, not associated in any way with the newly French squadron. Several Royal Navy ships were waiting just off the coast for the day he was obliged to leave—the Dutch authorities making a great show of trying to eject him—but as winter storms made it more and more difficult for them to keep station, Jones (after recruiting another American commander, Gustavus Conyngham, who had escaped from British captivity) slipped away among a group of Dutch ships on 27 December and sailed to France.

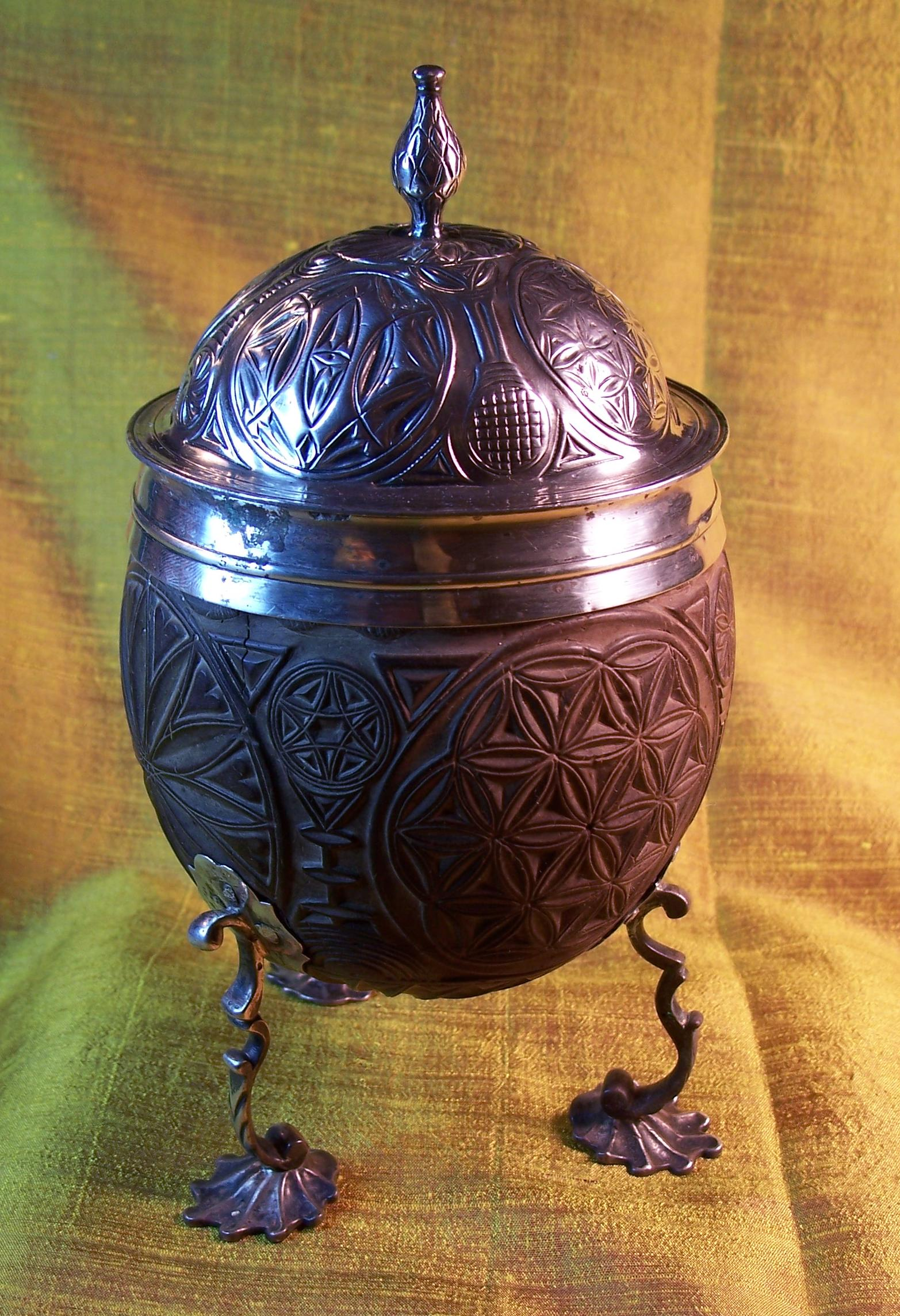
Coconut Cup in Silver, presented to Pearson in 1780 by the Royal Exchange Assurance

Back in England, something rather unexpected was happening. On the one hand, the overall effects of Jones's cruise and the activities of other raiders, such as the privateer duo of Black Prince and Black Princess, were reported with a sort of resentful admiration. On the other, although Pearson and Piercy had lost the battle, they were the only Royal Navy captains who had actually managed to engage Jones's squadron at all, and they had sunk his flagship. Their official reports appeared in British newspapers in mid-October, forcing the Americans to leak Jones's report (some of which he had not intended for publication). Most importantly, they had fully achieved their mission, which was to protect the convoy. When they returned home, about the beginning of November, they were honoured by the towns of Kingston upon Hull and Scarborough and were rewarded by both the Russia Company, principal owner of vessels in the convoy, and the Royal Exchange Assurance Company. Pearson even gained a knighthood. In 1780, to honour him for his actions in protecting the convoy, Pearson was presented with three Coconut Cups mounted in silver by Wakelin & Taylor. In 1782, the Royal Navy took the unusual step of naming a new ship Serapis—an acknowledgement rarely given to a vessel which lost a battle.

== Order of battle ==
=== American/French squadron ===
- Ship Bonhomme Richard (42 guns)
- Frigate Alliance (36)
- Frigate Pallas (32)
- Brigantine Vengeance (12 or 14)
- Captured schooner (boarding party)
- Total: 122–124 guns

=== British convoy escorts ===
- Frigate/ship hybrid Serapis (44 guns)
- HM hired armed ship Countess of Scarborough (20)
- Total: 64 guns
