= Striking the colors =

To haul down a flag to indicate surrender

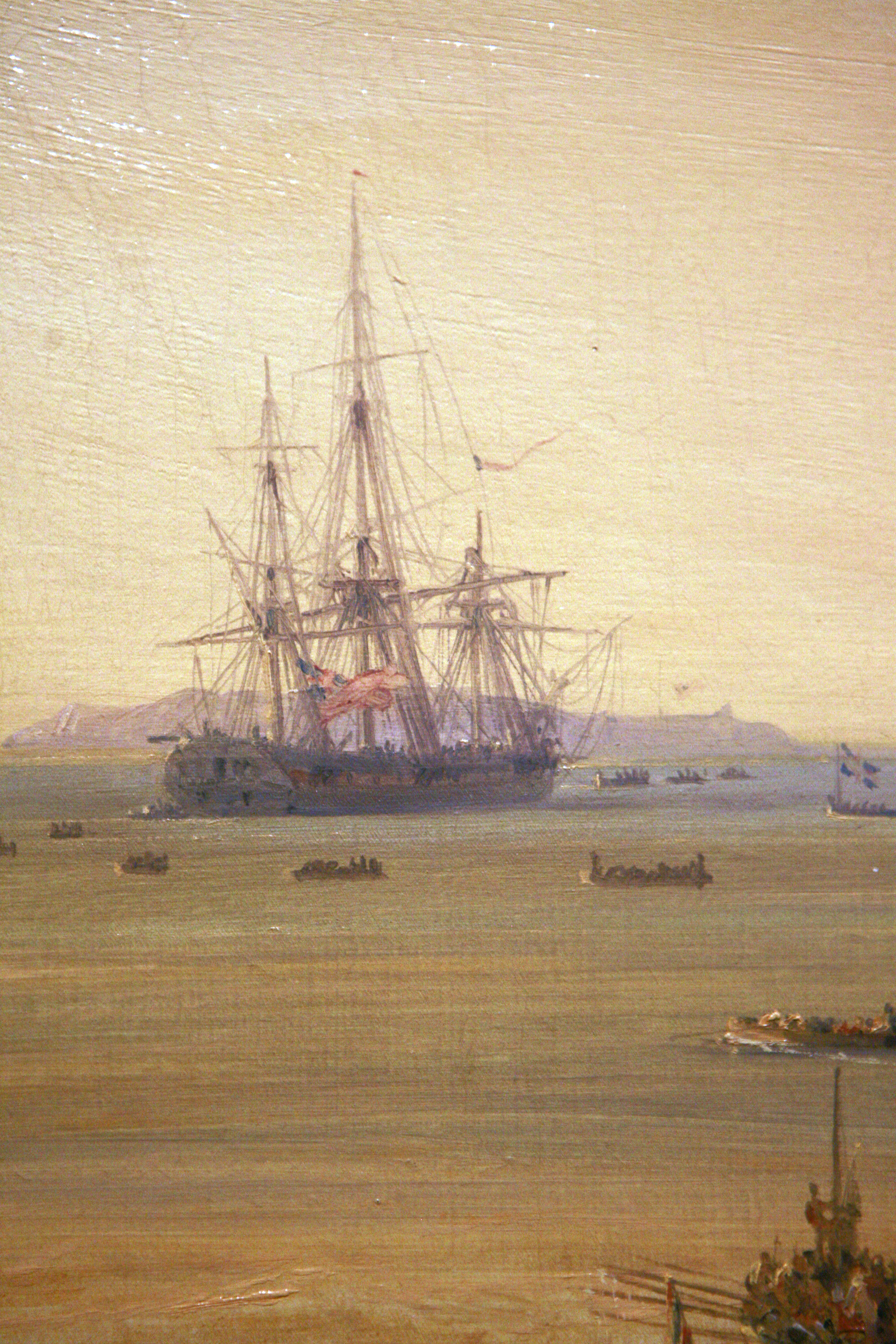
HMS Iphigenia striking her colours at the Battle of Grand Port in 1810

Striking the colors—meaning lowering the flag (the "colors") that signifies a ship's or garrison's allegiance—is a universally recognized indication of surrender, particularly for ships at sea. For a ship, surrender is dated from the time the ensign is struck.

== In international law ==
"Colours. A national flag (or a battle ensign). The colours ... are hauled down as a token of submission."

International law absolutely requires a ship of war to fly its ensign at the commencement of any hostile acts, i.e., before firing on the enemy. During battle there is no purpose in striking the colors other than to indicate surrender.

It was and is an offense to continue to fight after striking one's colors, and an offense to continue to fire on an enemy after she has struck her colors, unless she indicates by some other action, such as continuing to fire or seeking to escape, that she has not truly surrendered. For this reason, striking the colors is conclusive evidence of a surrender having taken place in the case of a warship, but not in the case of a merchant ship. What would be perfidy in the case of a warship is not in the case of a merchant ship: a merchant ship may strike its colors as a ruse de guerre in an attempt to escape capture, since it does not engage the enemy in combat.

In distinction to striking one's colors, hoisting a white flag, in itself, is not an indication of surrender. Rather, hoisting a white flag indicates a request for a truce in order to communicate with the enemy. Under the Geneva Conventions, persons carrying or waving a white flag are still not to be fired upon, nor are they allowed to open fire.

== Understood meaning ==
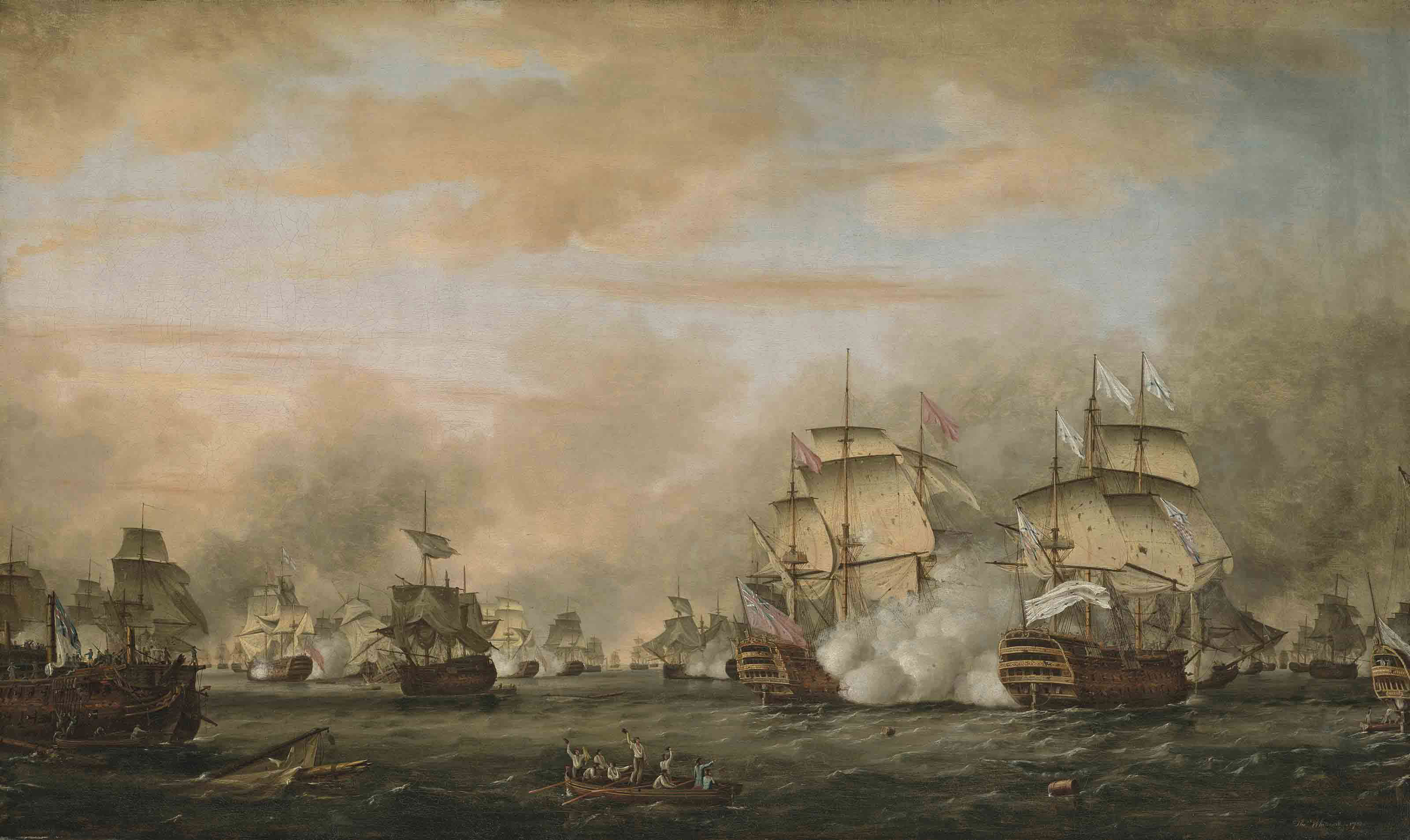
Ville de Paris striking her colours at the Battle of the Saintes in 1782

Nailing the colors to the mast is a traditional sign of defiance, indicating that the colors will never be struck, that the ship will never surrender. On 23 September 1779, Capt. Richard Pearson of HMS Serapis, nailed the British ensign to the ensign staff with his own hands before going into battle against Continental Navy ship Bonhomme Richard. Later, after Bonhomme Richard's ensign was shot away, Pearson asked Capt. John Paul Jones of Bonhomme Richard to confirm he had struck his colors. However, Jones denied it and the battle continued.

In 1807, the captain of Chesapeake refused to allow inspection of his ship for deserters. Consequently, HMS Leopard opened fire. Ten minutes later Chesapeake struck her colors as a token of surrender. Her log recorded "Having ... haul'd down our Colours."

Almost exactly six years later, when the United States had declared war on the United Kingdom, Chesapeake engaged Shannon outside Boston in the only equal match of that war. Following a brief exchange of gunfire, 21 of the British crew boarded and took control of Chesapeake. Since most of the American crew had fled belowdecks, the British sailors pulled down Chesapeake's flag themselves.

In 1811, while the United States and the United Kingdom were at peace with each other, U.S. frigate President engaged HM sloop of war Little Belt. John Rodgers, Captain of President reported to the Secretary of the Navy, that "when perceiving our opponent's Gaff & Colours down ... I ... embraced the earliest moment to stop our fire and prevent the further effusion of blood."

On 29 July 1812, at the start of the War of 1812, Lt. William M. Crane, USN, commanding officer of U.S. brig Nautilus, reported his capture by a British squadron in these words: "the chasing ship put her helm up hoisted a broad pendant and English colours and ranged under my lee quarter—unable to resist I was compelled to strike the Flag of the United States."

Captain David Porter, USN, of U.S. frigate Essex reported the capture of HM brig Alert on 13 August 1812 in these words: "He avoided the dreadful consequences that our broad side would in a few moments have produced by prudentially striking his colours."

On 19 August 1812, the U.S. frigate Constitution chased HM frigate Guerriere. "... it being now dark we could not see whether she had any colours, flying or not...[so I sent an officer under] a flag [of truce] to see whether she had surrendered or not." Captain James Richard Dacres, RN, of Guerriere reported the surrender of his ship, "When calling my few remaining officers together, they were all of opinion that any further resistance would be a needless waste of lives, I order'd, though reluctantly, the Colours to be struck."

The Journal of HMS Poictiers reports the capture of U.S. sloop of war Wasp on 18 October 1812 as follows: "Fired Several Shot at the chase, Observed [chase] hoist American Colours, ... Shortnd sail, the chase having Struck her colours."

Captain William Bainbridge, USN, reported a battle of HM frigate Java with USS Constitution on 29 December 1812, "...Got very close to the enemy in a very [effective] raking position, athwart his bows & was at the very instance of raking him, when he most prudently Struck his Flag." Lt. Henry D. Chads, RN, of Java, reported her surrender, "At 5:50 our Colours were lowered from the Stump of the Mizen Mast and we were taken possession a little after 6."

U.S. sloop of war Hornet engaged HM brig sloop Peacock on 24 February 1813. Badly damaged and sinking, Peacock, signalled her surrender by lowering her ensign, As a signal of distress, she then hoisted an ensign upside down. Since the loss of rigging hindered visibility, her senior surviving officer made another sign, "I was compelled ... to wave my Hat in acknowledgement of having struck[,] the Ensign having fallen with the Gaff into the Water."
