= Serapis flag =

1779 United States ensign

The "Serapis" or "John Paul Jones" flag

Serapis is a name given to an unconventional, early United States ensign flown from the captured British frigate Serapis.

At the September 23, 1779 Battle of Flamborough Head, U.S. Navy Captain John Paul Jones captured the Serapis, but his own ship, the Bonhomme Richard, sank, and her ensign had been blown from the mast into the sea during the battle. Jones, now commanding the Serapis without having a U.S. ensign to fly on it, sailed to the island port of Texel, which belonged to the neutral Dutch United Provinces. Officials from Britain argued that Jones was a pirate, since he sailed a captured vessel flying no known national ensign.

A year earlier, Arthur Lee, U.S. commissioner in France, wrote in a letter to Henry Laurens that the U.S. ships' "colors should be white, red, and blue alternately to thirteen" with a "blue field with thirteen stars" in the canton. Benjamin Franklin and John Adams, ambassadors to France, wrote a similar description of United States flags:

It is with pleasure that we acquaint your excellency that the flag of the United States of America consists of thirteen stripes, alternately red, white, and blue; a small square in the upper angle, next the flagstaff, is a blue field, with thirteen white stars, denoting a new constellation.

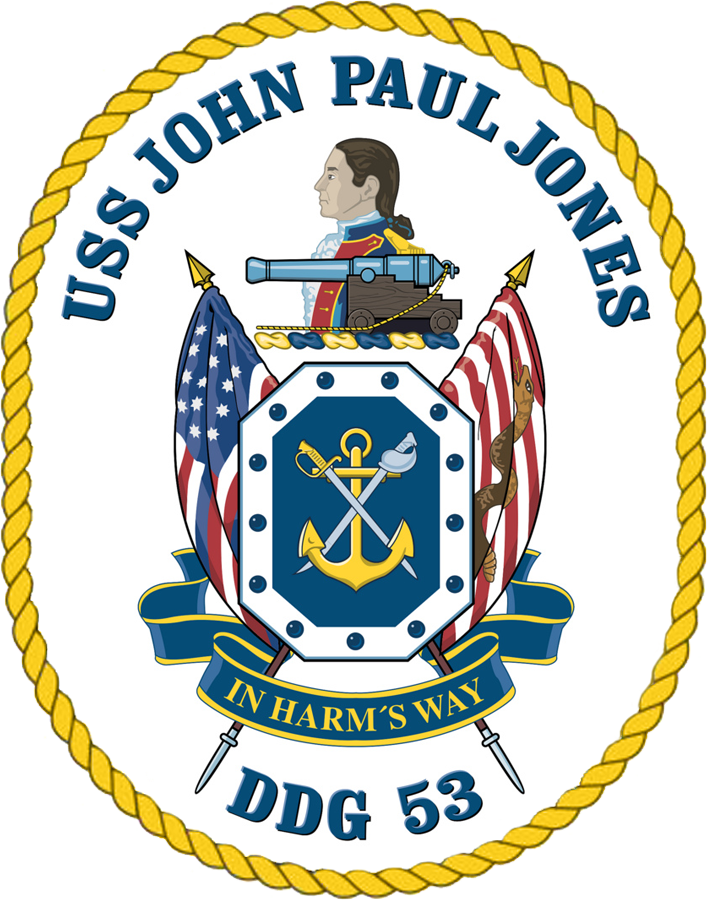
Coat of arms of the USS John Paul Jones (DDG-53).

Apparently based upon this description, a recognizable ensign was quickly made to fly aboard the Serapis, and Dutch records edited to include a sketch of the ensign to make it official. The Dutch could, therefore, recognize the flag and avoid the legal controversy of Jones' captured ship. The Dutch records survive and provide the original sketch of the ensign. The sketch is labeled "Serapis" and dated 5 October 1779, just one day after the Francis Hopkinson style flag, labeled "Alliance" (a ship in Jones' fleet), was entered.

There are five known illustrations of U.S. flags with tri-color stripes. Tri-colored stripes appeared in various European almanacs into the 19th century, featuring stars with 4, 5, or 6 points and arranged in various patterns. The Serapis flag is distinctive because of the four, irregularly placed blue stripes and 8-pointed stars. Although it was flown as a United States Ensign and was recognized as such by a foreign nation, it did not meet the Congressional description of U.S. flags under the Flag Resolution of 1777, which specified "alternate red and white" stripes.

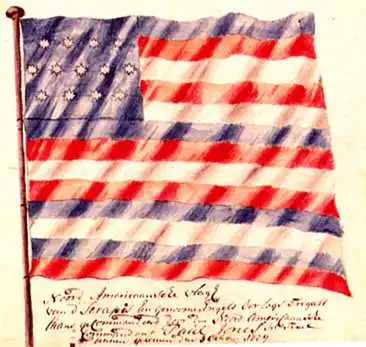
A painting, currently at the Chicago History Museum, depicting a sketch of the flag flown from prize HMS Serapis

The Serapis flag is also known as the "Franklin flag" due to the description given by Ambassador Franklin. It was featured on a 33¢ postage stamp issued in 2000, as a part of the U.S. Postal Service's Stars and Stripes series. The stamp was titled "John Paul Jones flag." The Franklin Flag is also recognized by the United States Army as the official flag of the 111th Infantry Regiment, which is known as "The Associators", and was founded by Benjamin Franklin in 1747. The flag was carried into battle during Operation Iraqi Freedom in 2009 by 1-111th Infantry, 56th Stryker Brigade Combat Team, 28th Infantry Division. The 111th Infantry Regiment is the only U.S. Army unit authorized to carry the Franklin (aka "Serapis") flag.

This flag, along with the First Navy Jack, is featured on the crest of the USS John Paul Jones (DDG-53).

The Serapis design remains popular among historic U.S. flag displays, and is offered by many flag vendors.

== See also ==
- Flag of Louisiana, During the Civil War, a secessionist flag similar in color, stripes, and stars seemed closer to the modern-day flag of Vietnam.
- Flag of Hawaii, which is similar in alternating blue, white and red stripes, but has the Union Jack instead of white stars on a blue field.
- Prinsenvlag, Although no longer the official national flag, variants of the Prinsenvlag influenced the flags of South Africa (1928–1994), New York City, Albany, and several Dutch-descended communities in North America.

== References and links ==
- Mastai, Boleslaw and Marie-Louise D'Otrange The Stars and the Stripes. The American Flag as Art and as History from the Birth of the Republic to the Present ©1973. Alfred A. Knopf, New York. ISBN 0-394-47217-9
- Robinson, J. Dennis Unfurling Paul Jones' Flag 22 Sept 2001. ©2001, SeacoastNH.com.
- Znamierowski, Alfred The World Encyclopedia of Flags ©1999, 2002 Anness Publishing Limited, London, UK.
