= Pierre-Charles Canot =

French engraver

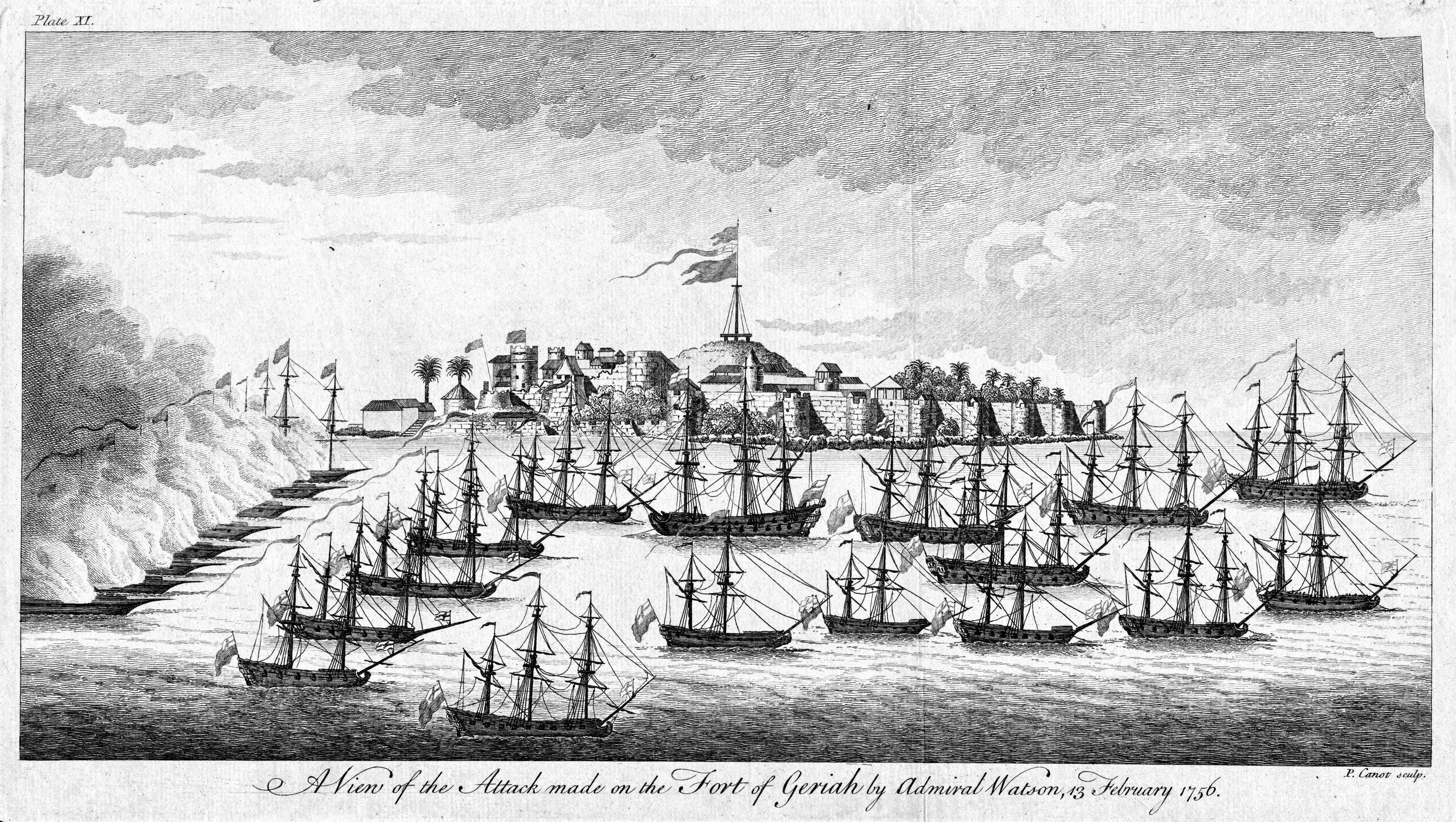
A View of the Attack made on the Fort of Geriah by Admiral Watson, 13 February 1756 by Pierre-Charles Canot, British Museum, between 1756 and 1777. The Fort of Geriah in India was later called Vijaydurg Fort.

Pierre-Charles Canot (c. 1710 – 1777) was a French engraver who spent most of his career in England.

== Life ==
Canot was born in France in about 1710. In 1740 he moved to England, where he lived there the rest of his life. He was elected an Associate Engraver of the Royal Academy in 1770, and died at Kentish Town, then just outside London, in 1777. He engraved a large number of landscapes, sea-pieces, and other subjects after artists including Jan van Goyen, Lorrain and Jean Pillement. Joseph Strutt believed that his best prints were some large plates of maritime subjects after the works of Richard Paton.

== Works ==
His prints include:

- A Slight Breeze after Bakhuisen.
- A Fresh Breeze after W. van de Velde.
- A Calm after W. van de Velde.
- A Storm after W. van de Velde.
- Returning from Market after P. de Laer.
- The Amorous Toper after D. Teniers.
- The Dutch Smokers after Teniers.
- The Dutch Cottage after Pillement.
- Autumn after Pillement.
- Winter after Pillement.
- A Dutch Merry-making after Ostade.
- Pyramus and Thisbe after L. Bramer.
- The Tempest after S. de Vliegher.
- An Italian Landscape after Gaspard Poussin.
- A Landscape—after Claude Lorrain.
- Sunrise, a marine after Claude Lorrain.
- Two pastoral subjects after Rosa da Tivoli.
- Views of Westminster Bridge and London Bridge after Scott.
- Seven fox-hunting subjects after Wootton.
- A true representation of Tower Hill as it appeared from a raised point of view from the north side on 18 August 1746, when the Earl of Kilmarnock and the Lord Balmerino were beheaded. [G Budd [ P C Canot ]
