= Flamborough Head =

Promontory in Yorkshire, United Kingdom

Coordinates: 54.11599°N 0.08305°W

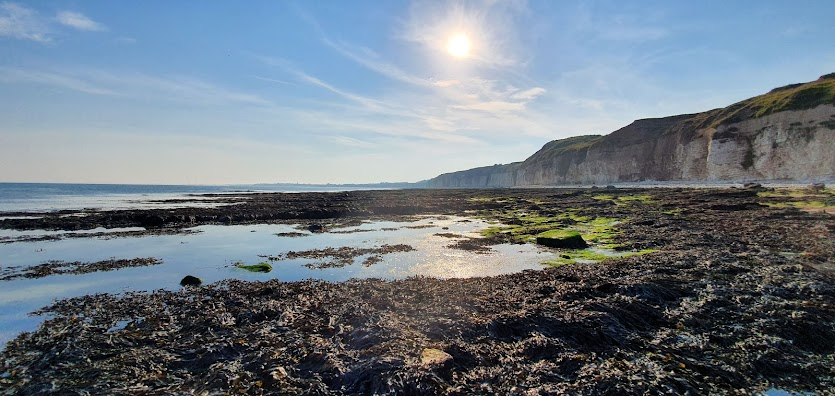
Cliffs and rock pools at Dane's Dyke South Landing, Flamborough Head

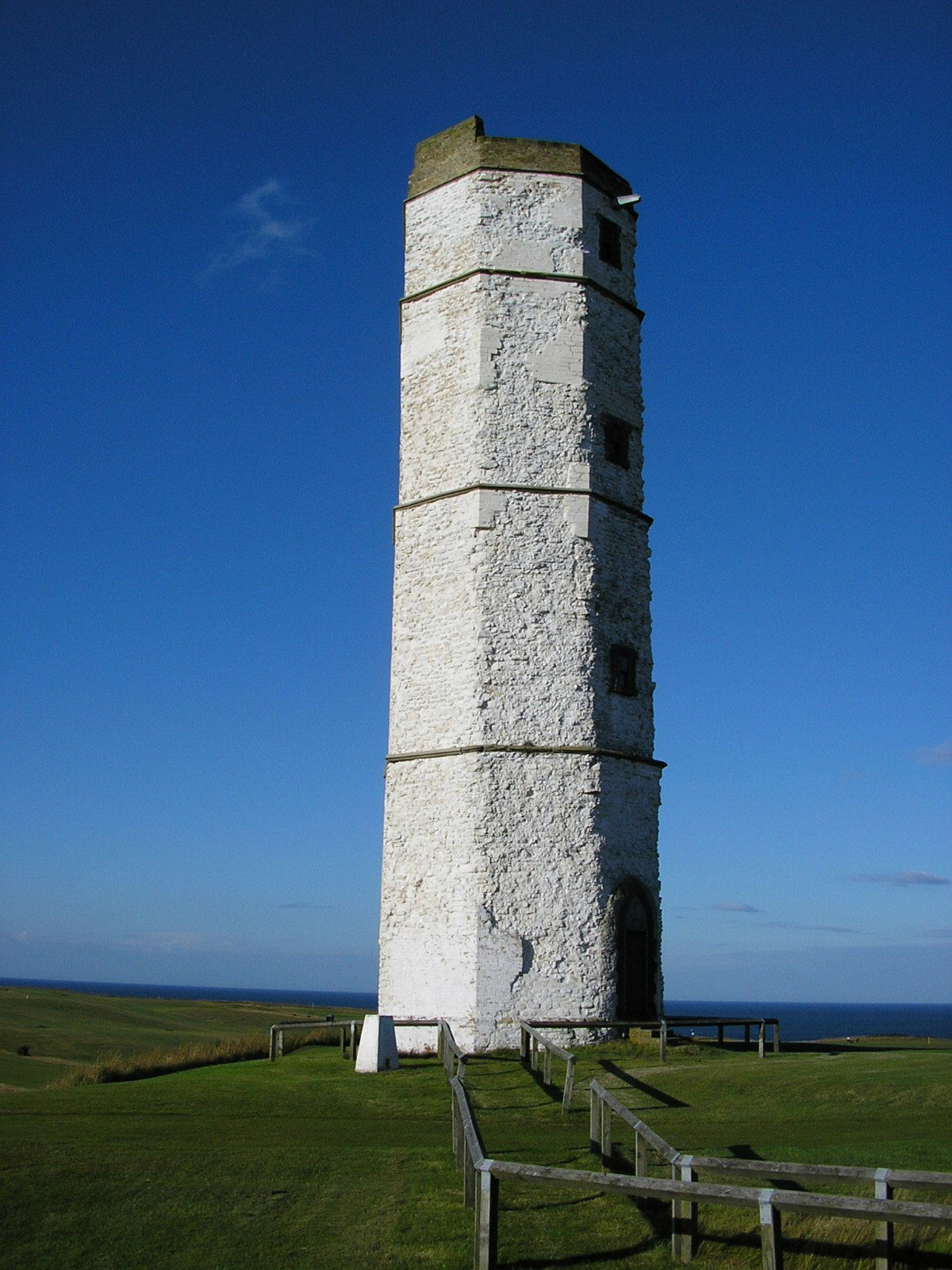
The chalk tower near Flamborough Head. Built in 1669, this is the oldest surviving complete lighthouse in England

Flamborough Head (/ˈflæmbərə/) is a promontory, 8 miles (13 km) long on the Yorkshire coast of England, between the Filey and Bridlington bays of the North Sea. It is a chalk headland, with sheer white cliffs. The cliff top has two standing lighthouse towers, the oldest dating from 1669 and Flamborough Head Lighthouse built in 1806. The older lighthouse was designated a Grade II* listed building in 1952 and is now recorded in the National Heritage List for England, maintained by Historic England. The cliffs provide nesting sites for many thousands of seabirds, and are of international significance for their geology.

== Special Area of Conservation ==
Flamborough Head has been designated a Special Area of Conservation (SAC) by the British Government's Joint Nature Conservation Committee (JNCC). (Special Areas of Conservation are strictly protected sites designated under the European Community Habitats Directive, which requires the establishment of a European network of important high-quality conservation sites to make a significant contribution to conserving the 189 habitat types and 788 species identified in Annexes to this Directive.) Flamborough Outer Headland is an 83 hectares (210 acres) Local Nature Reserve. Yorkshire Wildlife Trust manages the Flamborough Cliffs Nature Reserve, located on the headland.

== Site of Special Scientific Interest ==
The cliffs at Flamborough Head are designated a Site of Special Scientific Interest for both geological and biological significance. First designated in 1952, the SSSI area extends from Sewerby round the headland to Reighton Sands. The estimated 200,000 nesting seabirds, including one of only two mainland British gannetries, are the most notable biological feature.

=== Geology ===
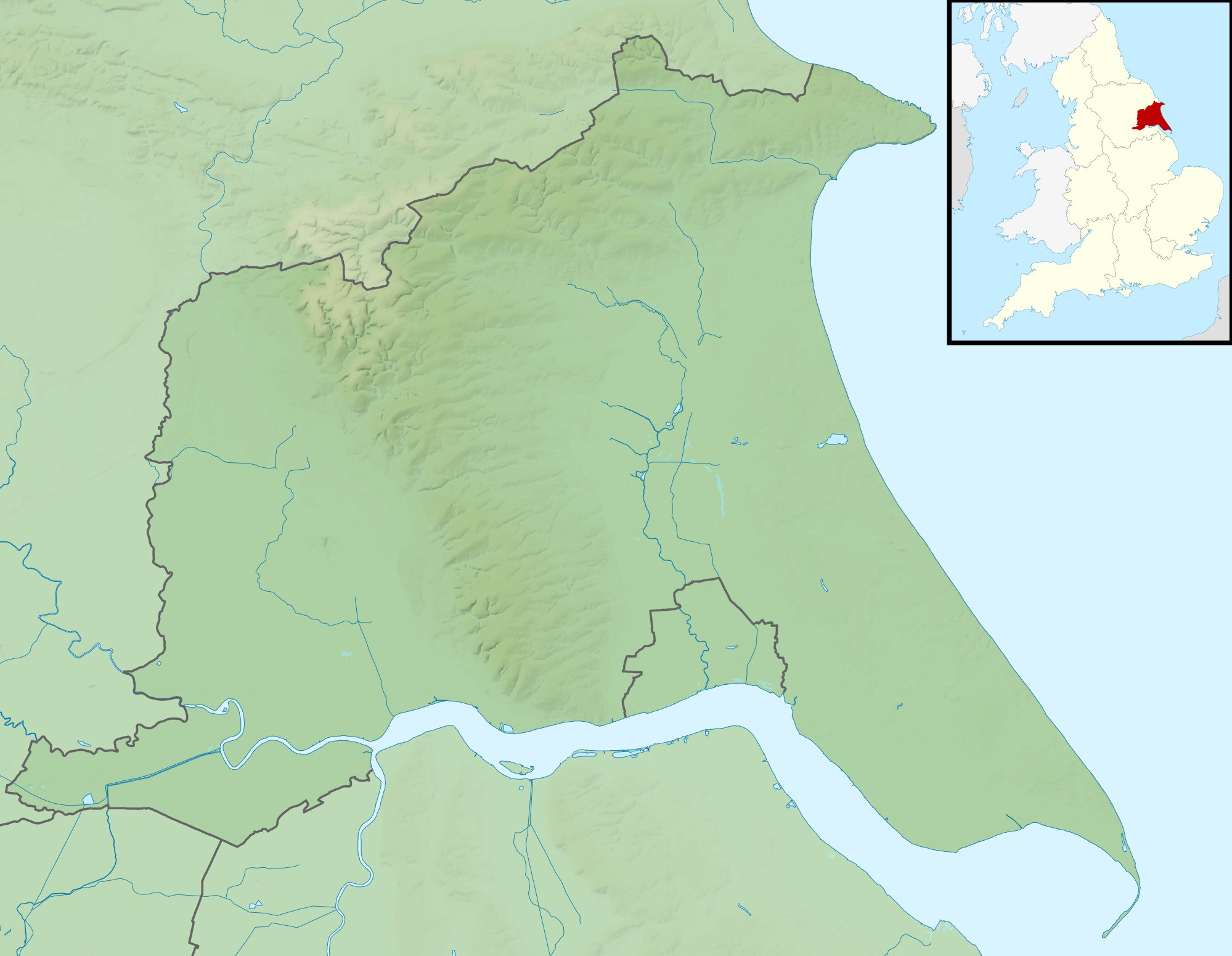
Flamborough Head in the East Riding of Yorkshire

The headland is the only chalk sea cliff in the north. The coastline within the SSSI has strata from the upper Jurassic through to top of the Cretaceous period, and the headland exhibits a complete sequence of Chalk Group North Sea Basin strata, dated from 100 to 70 million years ago. The various chalk deposits are known as the Ferriby, Welton, Burnham and Flamborough Chalk. The dramatic white cliffs contrast with the low coast of Holderness to the south, where the chalk is deeply buried and the glacial boulder clay above erodes very readily. The chalk cliffs have a larger number and a wider range of cave habitats at Flamborough than at any other chalk site in Britain, the largest of which are known to extend for more than 50 metres from their entrance on the coast. There are also stacks, natural arches and blowholes. The site is identified as being of international importance in the Geological Conservation Review.

=== Birds ===
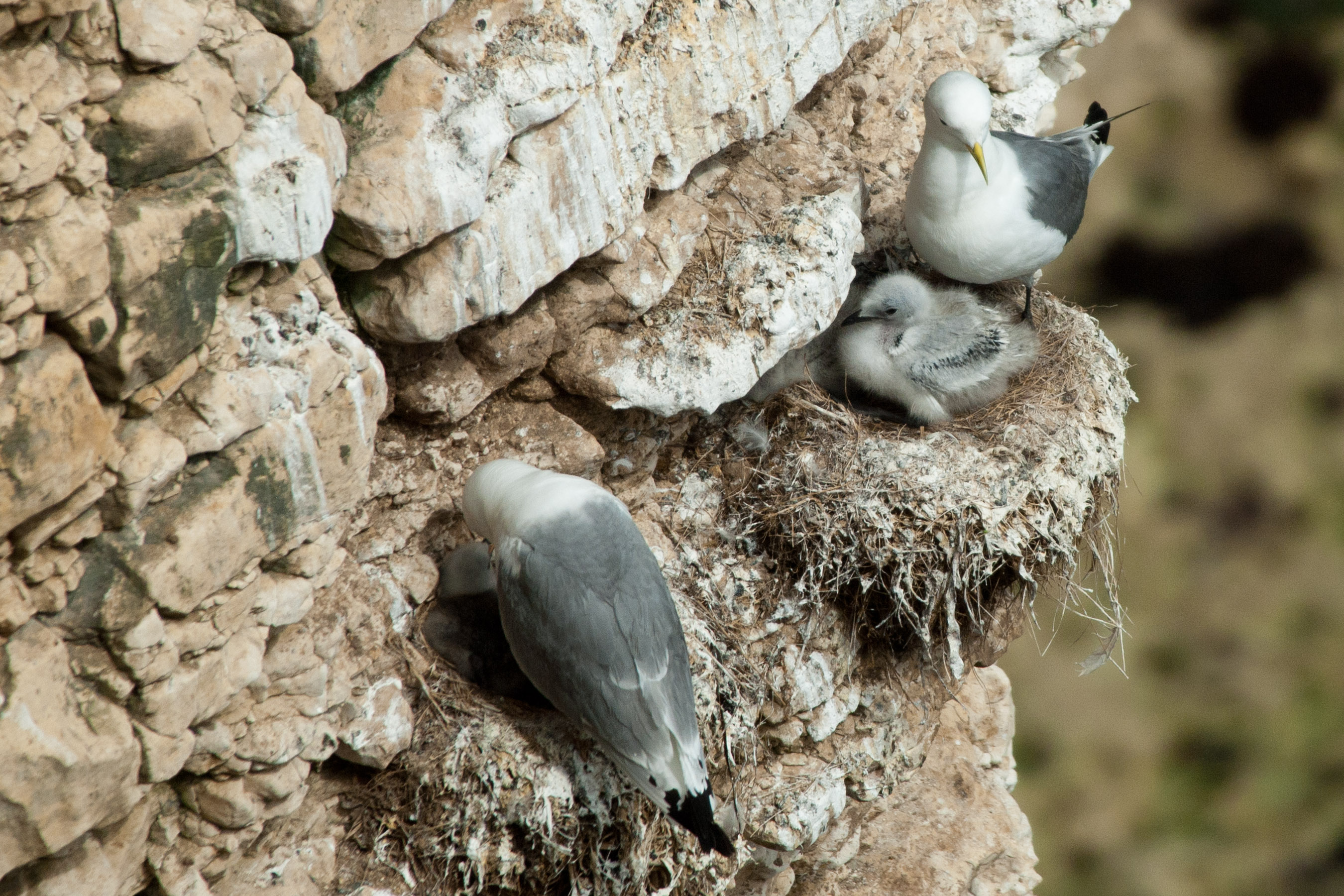
Kittiwakes (Rissa tridactyla) on the chalk cliffs at Flamborough Head

Seabirds such as northern gannets, kittiwakes and Atlantic puffins breed abundantly on the cliffs. Bempton Cliffs, on the north side of the headland, has an RSPB reserve and visitor centre.

The shooting of seabirds at Flamborough Head was condemned by Professor Alfred Newton in his 1868 speech to the British Association for the Advancement of Science. Local MP Christopher Sykes introduced the Sea Birds Preservation Act 1869, the first Act to protect wild birds in the United Kingdom. Shooting continued, with an 1886 edition of The Cornishman newspaper reporting the enormous flocks of sea birds are affording sport, with the fisherman killing the birds for selling to taxidermists; two boatmen were bagging a hundred birds daily.

Because it projects into the sea, Flamborough Head attracts many migrant birds in autumn, and is a key point for observing passing seabirds. When the wind is in the east, many birders watch for seabirds from below the lighthouse, or later in the autumn comb the hedges and valleys for landbird migrants. Flamborough Head has a bird observatory.

== Battle of Flamborough Head 1779 ==
A Franco-American squadron fought the Battle of Flamborough Head with a pair of Royal Navy frigates in the American War of Independence on 23 September 1779. In the engagement, USS Bonhomme Richard and Pallas, with USS Alliance, captured HMS Serapis and HM hired armed ship Countess of Scarborough, the best-known incident of Captain John Paul Jones's naval career. The toposcope at the lighthouse commemorates the 180th (1959) anniversary of the battle.

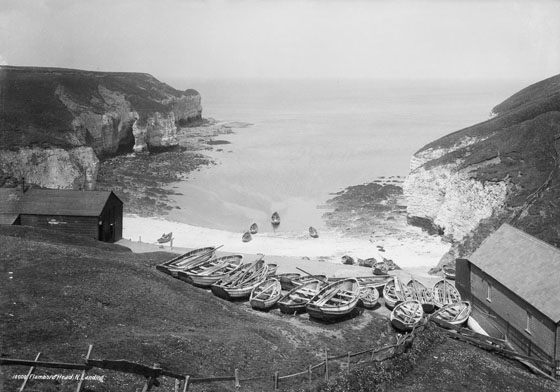
North Landing, Flamborough Head, c. 1880. Photo National Maritime Museum, ID: G2381

== Associated places ==
=== Danes Dyke ===
North and South Landings are two boat launching beaches, one to the north and one to the south of the headland. Danes Dyke is a 2-mile (3.2 km) long ditch which runs north to south, isolating the seaward 5 square miles (13 km^{2}) of the headland. The dyke and the steep cliffs make the enclosed territory and the two beaches easily defended. Despite its name, the dyke is prehistoric in origin, and Bronze Age arrowheads were found when it was excavated by Augustus Pitt Rivers in 1879. It is a Local Nature Reserve.

=== Thornwick Bay ===
On the north side of Flamborough Head lies Thornwick Bay, a bay with a rock beach surrounded by cliffs. The second part of the name Thornwick comes from the Old Norse word vík ('bay') (meaning that the modern name Thornwick Bay is tautologous). At the north side of the bay lies Thornwick Nebb, the final part of which comes from Old Norse neb ('promontory').

A plaque at Thornwick Bay commemorates the 1952 loss of Robert Redhead, the bowman of the Bridlington lifeboat, while attempting to rescue two girls, Joan Ellis and Gillian Fox, from drowning.

== Cultural references ==
Flamborough Head and the village of Flamborough are the setting for the book Bill Takes the Helm by Betty Bowen. In the book an American boy struggles to save his grandmother's house – in which he, his sister and grandmother are living – from destruction by the sea. He is also desperately trying to get used to England after the death of his mother, who requested in her will that he be sent there.

Flamborough Head was featured on the television programme Seven Natural Wonders as one of the wonders of Yorkshire and briefly in the first series of Coast.

Flamborough Head was featured in the finale of series 3 of the ITV drama Scott & Bailey.

North Landing beach was used as a film location for the 2016 re-make of Dad's Army.

== Lightning strike ==
During the evening of 23 August 2006, a lightning bolt hit a buttress on the cliffs, sending 100 tonnes of rock into the sea.
