= Richard Pearson (Royal Navy officer) =

Royal Navy officer (1731–1806)

Captain Sir Richard Pearson
- Portrait by Charles Grignion the Younger, 1780
- Born: March 1731; Langton Hall, Appleby-in-Westmorland
- Died: January 1806 (aged 74); Royal Naval Hospital, Greenwich
- Spouse: Margaret Harrison (m. 1769)
- Military career
- Allegiance: Great Britain; United Kingdom
- Branch: Royal Navy; East India Company
- Service years: 1745–1750 (RN); 1750–1755 (EIC); 1755–1806 (RN)
- Rank: Captain
- Commands: HMS Druid; HMS Speedwell; HMS Garland; HMS Serapis; HMS Alarm; HMS Arethusa; Lieutenant-Governor of the Royal Naval Hospital, Greenwich
- Conflicts: War of the Austrian Succession; Seven Years' War; Battle of Cuddalore; Battle of Negapatam; Battle of Pondicherry; Battle of Manila; American Revolutionary War; Battle of Flamborough Head; Battle of Ushant

Captain Sir Richard Pearson (March 1731 – January 1806) was a Royal Navy officer who was captain of the ship HMS Serapis during the American Revolutionary War.

As a lieutenant in the East Indies he served in the Seven Years' War, where he was severely wounded. He was subsequently unable to obtain a commission because his senior officers twice died before they could fulfil their promises. He finally became post-captain in 1773.

In 1779, in command of the 44-gun frigate Serapis and escorting a large convoy from the Baltic, he was attacked off Flamborough Head by a Franco-American squadron under John Paul Jones in the 42-gun Bonhomme Richard. The battle ended in Pearson surrendering Serapis to Jones but not before his spirited defence had covered the escape of the valuable convoy. Bonhomme Richard ended up sinking following the capture of Serapis, forcing Jones to lose his own ship and return to port in Pearson's captured vessel.

Pearson was considered a hero in Britain after the battle. He was knighted, received presents from the merchants and the freedoms of several towns. Jones was later asked how he felt about Pearson being knighted, and reportedly replied: "I'd like to meet him on the high seas again; I'll make him a lord!"

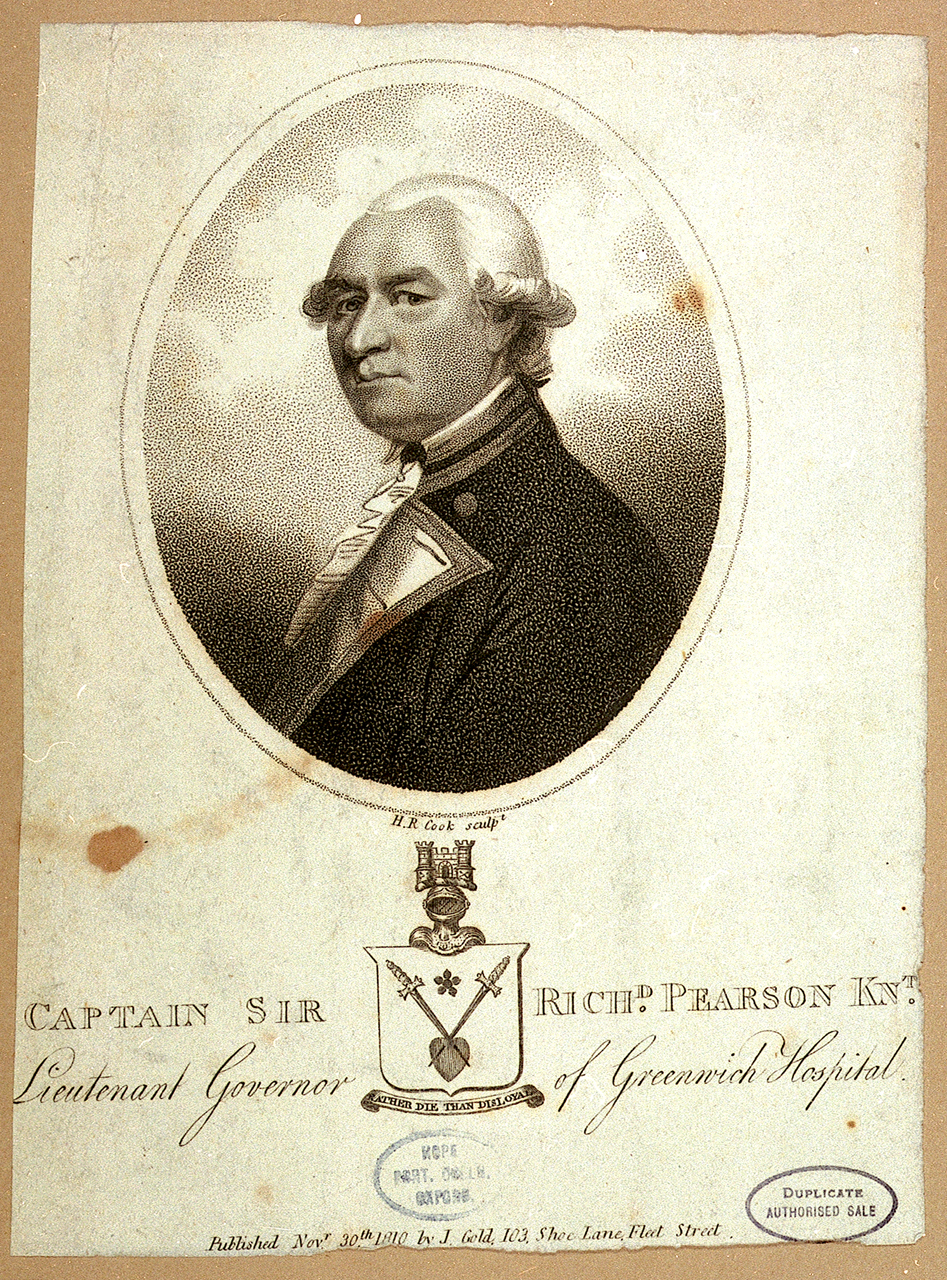
Captain Sir Richd Pearson Knt. Lieutenant Governor of Greenwich Hospital

Pearson's second son was Henry Shepherd Pearson who was Governor of Penang in 1808.

== In film ==
Pearson was portrayed by Peter Cushing in the film John Paul Jones (1959).
