= HMS Serapis (1779) =

Two-decked British Royal Navy fifth-rate (1779–1781)

Coordinates: 17°00′09″S 49°50′31″E

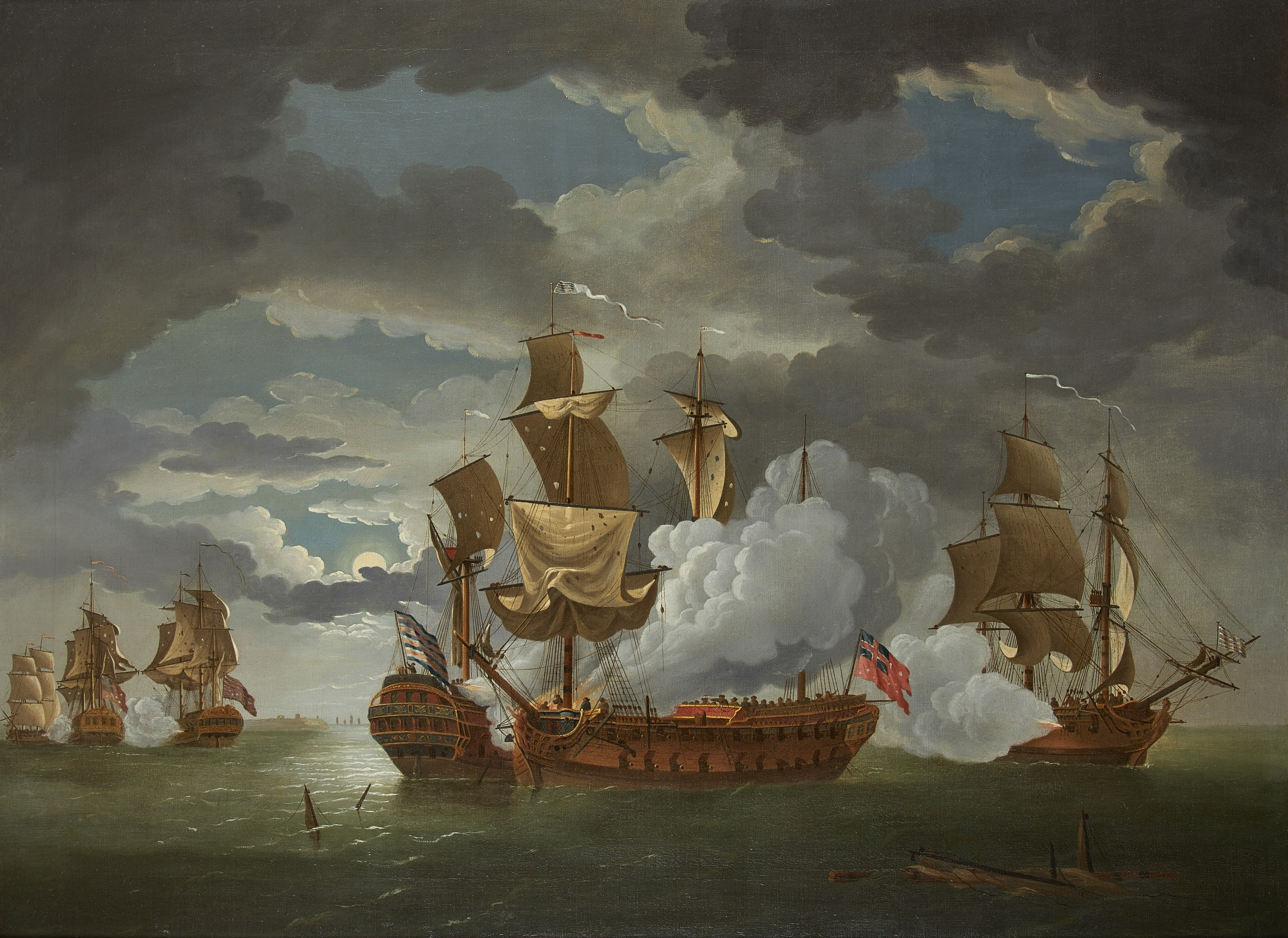
- Defence of Captn Pearson in his Majesty’s Ship Serapis and the Countess of Scarborough Arm’d Ship Captn Piercy, against Paul Jones's Squadron, 23 September 1779, by Richard Paton.

History

Great Britain
- Name: HMS Serapis
- Ordered: 11 February 1778
- Builder: Randall & Brent, Rotherhithe
- Laid down: 3 March 1778
- Launched: 4 March 1779
- Fate: Taken by American Bonhomme Richard, assisted by other vessels

United States
- Name: Serapis
- Fate: Transferred to France

France
- Name: Sérapis
- Fate: Wrecked in 1781 off Madagascar

General characteristics
- Class & type: Roebuck-class fifth-rate ship
- Tons burthen: 87926/94 (bm; as designed)
- Length: 140 ft (43 m) (gundeck); 116 ft 4 3/8 in (35 m) (keel)
- Beam: 37 ft 9 1/2 in (12 m)
- Depth of hold: 16 ft 4 in (5 m)
- Sail plan: Full-rigged ship
- Complement: 280 (300 from 1780)
- Armament: British service: Lower deck: 20 × 18-pounder guns; Upper deck: 22 × 9-pounder guns; (later upgraded to 12-pounder guns); Fc: 2 × 6-pounder guns; French service: 24 × 24-pounder guns + 22 × 18-pounder guns + 6 others

HMS Serapis was a Royal Navy two-decked, Roebuck-class fifth-rate. Randall & Company built her at Deptford Dockyard, Greenwich and launched her in March, 1779. She was originally armed with 44 guns (twenty 18-pounders, twenty 9-pounders, and four 6-pounders). Serapis was named after the god Serapis in Greek and Egyptian mythology. The Americans captured her during the American War of Independence. They transferred her to the French, who commissioned her as a privateer. She was lost off Madagascar in 1781 to a fire.

== American War of Independence ==
Serapis was commissioned in June 1779 under Captain Richard Pearson. On 23 September she engaged the American warship USS Bonhomme Richard under the command of Captain John Paul Jones in the North Sea at Flamborough Head, England. At the time of this battle, the ship carried 46 guns, mounting 2 additional six 6-pounders. The two vessels exchanged heavy fire and Bonhomme Richard lost most of her firepower, but by attaching the two ships together, Jones was able to overcome much of Pearson's advantage of greater firepower (although the Bonhomme Richard was a larger ship with a considerably greater crew). The famous quote, "I have not yet begun to fight!" was Jones's response to Pearson's premature call for Bonhomme Richard to surrender. The battle raged on for three hours as the crew of Bonhomme Richard tenaciously fought Serapis, raking her deck with gunfire. Eventually, USS Alliance, a frigate in Jones's squadron, began firing at both the attached ships indiscriminately. Bonhomme Richard began to sink, but Captain Pearson, unable to aim his guns at the frigate because he was tied to Jones's ship, surrendered, handing Serapis over to the Americans.

== Aftermath ==
Jones sailed to the neutral Dutch Republic, but diplomatic complications arose because the Dutch authorities did not recognize the United States. Jones renamed his capture Serapis. An improvised Serapis flag was secretly entered into the Dutch records to avoid the charges of piracy. Serapis and her consort, HM hired armed ship Countess of Scarborough, were later declared as French captures.

Although the two British vessels had lost the battle, they had succeeded perfectly in protecting the very valuable convoy, and both captains were well rewarded.

== Loss of Serapis ==
Between October and December 1779 Serapis was in the Texel. By September 1780 she was probably at Lorient.

The French Royal Navy commissioned Sérapis, and loaned her to a civilian master named Roche who planned to use the ship against the British in the Indian Ocean.

On 31 July 1781, Sérapis was at Madagascar, trading spirits and arak for rice, when the load master, lieutenant de frégate L'Héritier, had candles taken out of their fire-proof lanterns. The candles ignited alcohol vapour in the hull. The crew fought the fire for two and a half hours, but the flames eventually burned through the walls of the spirit locker and reached a powder magazine. The resulting explosion ripped the stern off the ship, sinking her. While eight men lost their lives, 215 people survived. The privateer Daliram returned them to Île Sainte-Marie, Madagascar.

== Discovery of the wreck ==
In November 1999, American nautical archeologists Richard Swete and Michael Tuttle located the remains of Serapis at Île Sainte-Marie.

== See also ==
- Serapis flag
