= USS Bonhomme Richard (1765) =

Frigate of the American Continental Navy

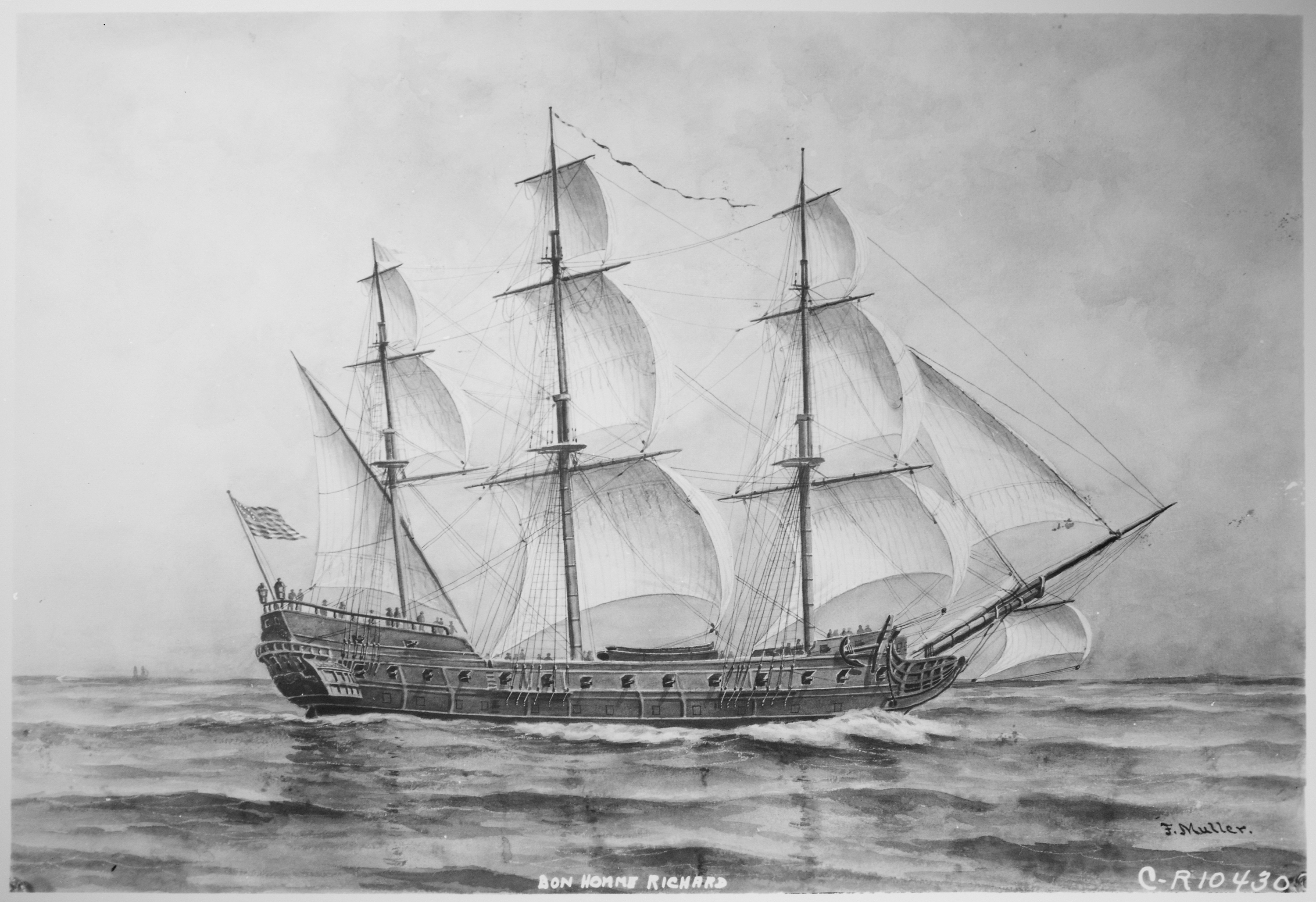

History

United States
- Name: Bonhomme Richard
- Namesake: Benjamin Franklin
- Builder: French Indies Company
- Laid down: 1765
- Launched: 1766
- Acquired: 4 February 1779
- In service: 4 February 1779
- Out of service: 25 September 1779
- Fate: Sunk by HMS Serapis

General characteristics
- Tonnage: 998
- Length: 152 ft (46 m)
- Beam: 40 ft (12 m)
- Draft: 19 ft (5.8 m)
- Propulsion: Sail
- Complement: 380 officers and enlisted
- Armament: 28 × 12-pound smoothbore; 6 × 18-pound smoothbore; 8 × 9-pound smoothbore

USS Bonhomme Richard was a 42-gun frigate of the Continental Navy named for Founding Father Benjamin Franklin. She was originally the East Indiaman Duc de Duras, which was built in France for the French Indies Company in 1765. The ship was purchased by French authorities and placed at the disposal of American Captain John Paul Jones on 4 February 1779 by King Louis XVI as a result of a loan to the United States by French shipping magnate Jacques-Donatien Le Ray.

== Origin ==
Bonhomme Richard was originally an East Indiaman named Duc de Duras, a merchant ship built at Lorient according to the plan drawn up by shipwright Antoine Groignard for the French Indies Company in 1765. Her design allowed her to be quickly transformed into a man-of-war in case of necessity to support the navy. She made two voyages to China, the first in 1766 and the second in 1769. At her return the French Indies Company had been dissolved, and all its installations and ships transferred to the French Navy. As a naval ship she made a voyage to Isle de France (Mauritius) before being sold to private shipowners in 1771. She sailed in private service until she was purchased by King Louis XVI in early 1779 and placed under the command of John Paul Jones on 4 February. The size and armament of Duc de Duras made her roughly equivalent to half of a 64-gun ship of the line.

Jones renamed her Bon Homme Richard (usually rendered in more correct French as Bonhomme Richard) in honor of Benjamin Franklin, the American Commissioner at Paris whose Poor Richard's Almanack was published in France under the title Les Maximes du Bonhomme Richard.

== First patrols ==
On 19 June 1779, Bonhomme Richard sailed from Lorient accompanied by USS Alliance, Pallas, Vengeance, and Cerf with troop transports and merchant vessels under convoy to Bordeaux and to cruise against the British in the Bay of Biscay. Forced to return to port for repair, the squadron sailed again August 14, 1779. It went northwest around the west coast of the British Isles into the North Sea and then down the east coast. The squadron took 16 merchant vessels as prizes.

== Battle of Flamborough Head ==
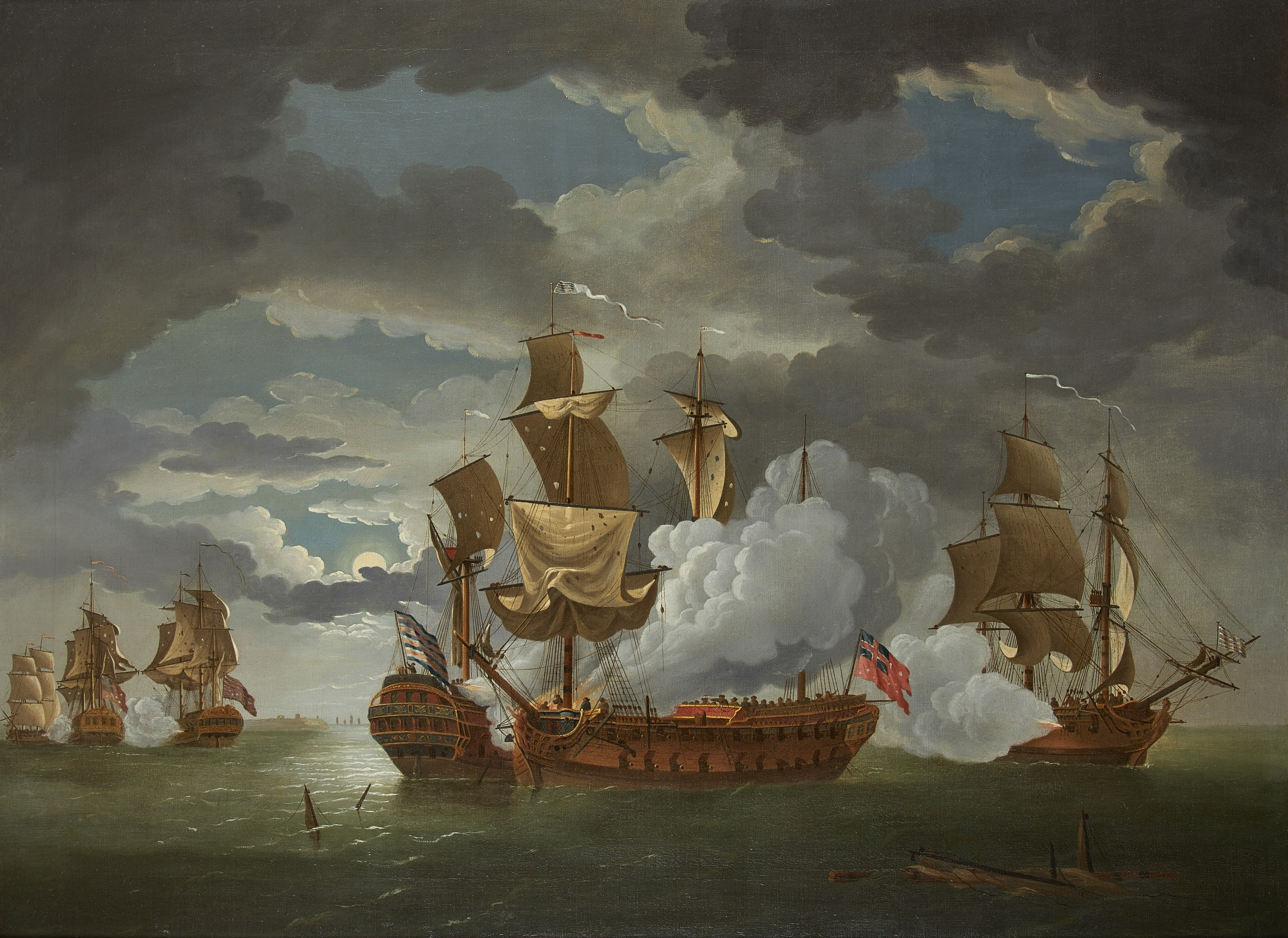
Bonhomme Richard (third from right) during the battle

On 23 September 1779, the squadron encountered the Baltic Fleet of 41 sail under convoy of HMS Serapis and HM hired armed ship Countess of Scarborough near Flamborough Head. Bonhomme Richard and Serapis entered a bitter engagement at about 6:00 p.m. The battle continued for the next four hours, costing the lives of nearly half of the American and British crews. The more heavily armed Serapis used its firepower to rake Bonhomme Richard with devastating effect. The commander of Serapis, Captain Richard Pearson finally called on Jones to surrender. He allegedly replied, "Sir, I have not yet begun to fight!"

Jones eventually managed to lash the ships together, nullifying his opponent's greater maneuverability and allowing him to take advantage of the larger size and considerably more numerous crew of Bonhomme Richard. An attempt by the Americans to board Serapis was repulsed, as was an attempt by the British to board Bonhomme Richard. Finally, after another of Jones's ships joined the fight, Pearson was forced to surrender at about 10:30 p.m. Bonhomme Richard – shattered, on fire, leaking badly – defied all efforts to save her and sank about 36 hours later at 11:00 a.m. on 25 September 1779. Jones sailed the captured Serapis to the Dutch United Provinces for repairs.

== Search for the wreck ==
Bonhomme Richard's final resting location was the subject of much speculation. A number of unsuccessful efforts had been conducted to locate the wreck. The location was presumed to be in approximately 180 feet (55 m) of water off Flamborough Head, Yorkshire, a headland near where her final battle took place. The quantity of other wrecks in the area and a century of fishing trawler operations had complicated all searches.

A wreck was located in 1974 off Flamborough Head and in 2001 it was concluded that there was a high possibility that the wreck was that of the Bonhomme Richard. The remains were designated under the Protection of Wrecks Act in 2002. The wreck is a Protected Wreck managed by Historic England.

One season's attempts to locate and retrieve the ship, or some artifacts from her, using USNS Grasp were filmed for the Discovery Channel's Mighty Ships series in 2011. The U.S. Navy's mission was unsuccessful. In 2012, an expedition with the Ocean Technology Foundation and the French Navy located a wreck of interest (called "Target 131") in 70 meters of water. The wreck is mostly buried, but some artifacts are visible on the seabed surface, including an anchor that would fit the dimensions and style of the kedge anchor on the Bonhomme Richard. In 2014, the French Navy and Ocean Technology Foundation mounted an expedition to have the French Navy dive Target 131. Artifacts discovered by the divers included a deadeye block (part of a sailing ship's rigging), large sections of half-buried planking, and what appeared to be an iron spar hoop, with a few pieces of decomposing wood still encircled in it. No evidence of modern objects has been found on the site. The Global Foundation for Ocean Exploration (GFOE) has since continued the work of the Ocean Technology Foundation, leading an expedition with the French and U.S. navies in 2016, again aboard USNS Grasp. More remote sensing was conducted, and researchers discovered additional objects within the wreck site that were deemed worthy of further investigation. A 2019 expedition involving GFOE, the French navy, and the U.S. Navy was planned, but was postponed indefinitely due to a disagreement among France and the U.S. about the ultimate ownership of the Bonhomme Richard. The goal of this mission was to prove or disprove Target 131 as being the Bonhomme Richard. In 2023, GFOE partnered with OceanX for a ROV investigation of Target 131, which revealed two new artifacts believed to be iron reinforcements of the wooden hull, and a possible iron knee (a support used between decks). The latter is one of the defining characteristics of the Bonhomme Richard and was known to be used by the French when it was outfitted as a warship.

In 2018, remains were found after Merlin Burrows conducted 25 dives on a different wreck site, with 32 ships-timbers recovered and in excess of 140 non-recovered artifacts identified, believed by Merlin Burrows to be those of the Bonhomme Richard, in shallow water very close to the coast of Filey, North Yorkshire, England, by the Land and Sea search team Merlin Burrows. However, the location of this wreck remains contentious with conflicting views between different research teams and some eyewitness accounts on land, stating that on the morning of 25 September 1779, the Bonhomme Richard disappeared out of sight over the horizon. Collaboration between Merlin Burrows and the United States Naval History and Heritage Command was reported as ongoing in early 2019.

== See also ==
- Serapis flag
