= Poitiers (disambiguation) =

Poitiers is a city in France.

Poitiers may also refer to:

== Places ==
- Roman Catholic Archdiocese of Poitiers, France
- Arrondissement of Poitiers, Vienne, Nouvelle-Aquitaine, France
- Canton of Poitiers (disambiguation)
- Grand Poitiers (English: Greater Poitiers), administrative unit in Vienne, Nouvelle-Aquitaine, France
- County of Poitiers, Aquitaine; a county that became the province of Poitou, France

=== Facilities and structures ===
- University of Poitiers, Poitiers, Poitou, France
- Poitiers Campus, Sciences Po
- Poitiers–Biard Airport, Poitou, France
- Poitiers Cathedral, Poitiers, Poitou, France
- Poitiers station, Poitiers, Poitou, France; a train station
- Palace of Poitiers, Poitiers, Poitou, France

== People ==
- Bishop of Poitiers, a position in the Roman Catholic Church
- Count of Poitiers, a noble title of Aquitaine, France
- House of Poitiers, a noble house of Gaul, Aquitaine, France
- House of Poitiers-Lusignan, a noble house of Aquitaine with kingships in several Crusader kingdoms

=== Persons ===
- Abra of Poitiers (343–360), Saint Abra
- Saint Agnes of Poitiers (died 586)
- Agnes of Poitou of House Poitiers (1025–1077, also Agnes of Poitiers), Holy Roman Empress
- Aliénor de Poitiers (1444–1509), Burgundian courtier
- Aymar VI de Poitiers (14th century), Count of Valentinois
- Diane de Poitiers (1500–1566), French noblewoman and courtier
- Ebroin of Poitiers (died 850), bishop and administrator of Poitiers
- Gilbert of Poitiers (1085–1154), theologian and logician
- Henry of Poitiers (1217–1217), Bailiff of the Kingdom of Jerusalem
- Hildegar of Poitiers (12th century), physician and mathematician
- Hilary of Poitiers (310–367), Bishop of Poitiers
- Hugh of Poitiers (died 1167), Benedictine monk and chronicler
- Jean de Poitiers (1475–1539), French nobleman
- John of Poitiers (died 1204), Roman Catholic prelate
- John of Poitiers-Lusignan (died 1343), Regent of the Kingdom of Cillicia
- Louis of Poitiers (disambiguation)
- Peter of Poitiers (1130–1215), theologian
- Peter of Poitiers (secretary) (12th century), monk and translator scribe
- Philip of Poitiers (disambiguation)
- Radegund of Poitiers (520–587), Thuringian princess and Frankish queen
- Raymond of Poitiers (1105–1149), Prince of Antioch
- Richard of Poitiers (died 1174), Benedictine monk and author
- William of Poitiers (disambiguation)

== Military ==
- Battle of Vouillé (507; also called "Battle of Poitiers"), between the Franks and the Visigoths
- Battle of Tours-Poitiers (732; also called "Battle of Poitiers"), in the Umayyad Invasion of Gaul
- Battle of Poitiers (1356), in the Hundred Years War between England and France
- Siege of Poitiers (1569), French Wars of Religion

== Other uses ==
- First Edict of Poitiers (1573), a treaty that ended the first of the Wars of Religion in France
- Edict of Poitiers (1577), a treaty between France and Huguenot princes
- The Battle of Poitiers (painting), an 1830 painting by Eugène Delacroix
- FC Poitiers, Poitiers, France; a soccer team

== See also ==
- La Séquestrée de Poitiers (1849–1913), an adult woman kidnapped and confined by her mother
- Poitier (surname)
- Poitou (disambiguation)
