= French ship Invincible (1780) =

Warship of the French Navy (1780–1806)

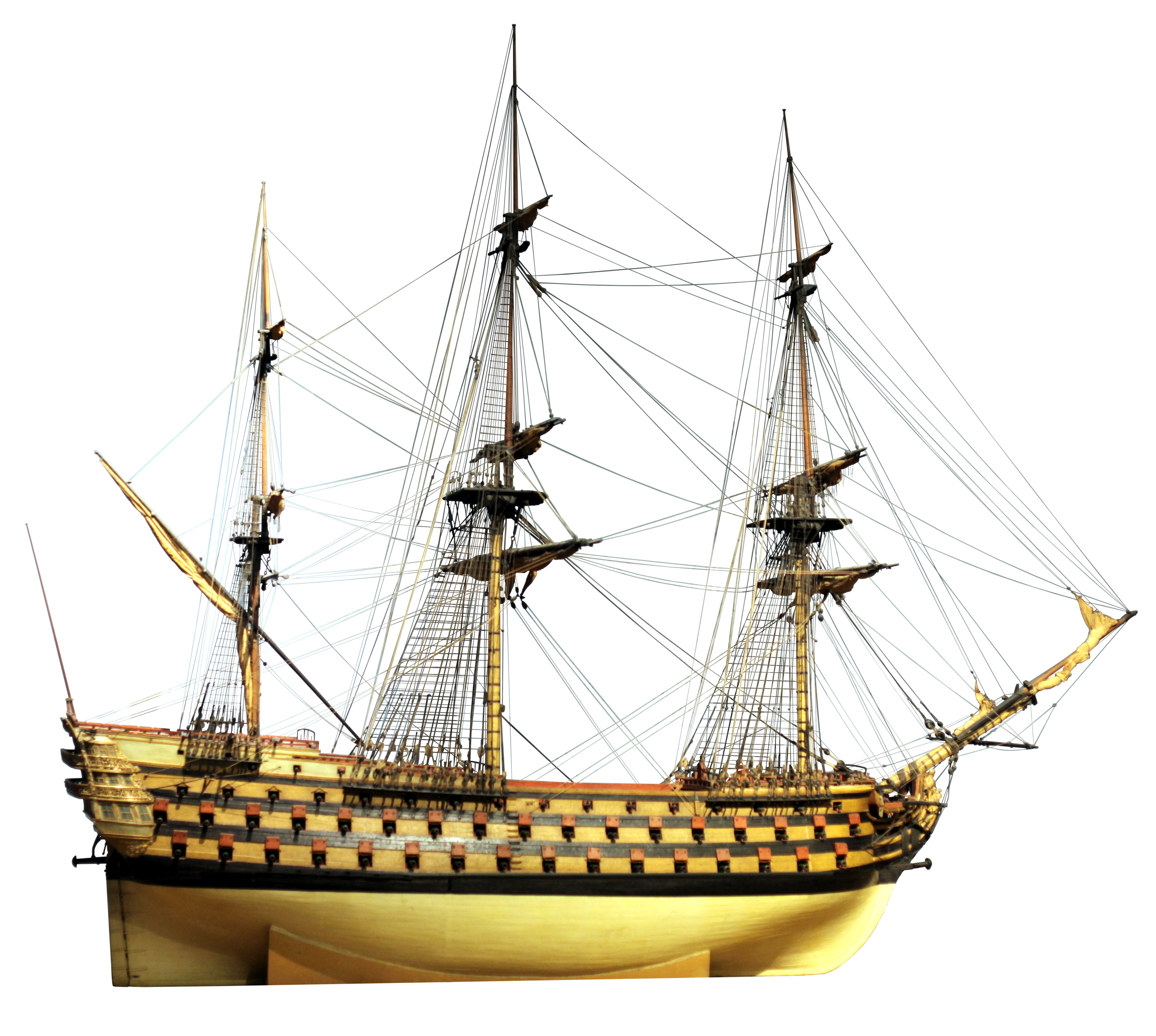
- Detail of Royal Louis sistership at Musee national de la Marine.

History

France
- Name: Invincible
- Builder: Rochefort
- Laid down: 20 February 1779
- Launched: 20 March 1780
- Commissioned: May 1780
- Fate: Broken up in 1806

General characteristics
- Class & type: First-rate ship of the line
- Type: Invincible class
- Displacement: 4670 tonneaux
- Tons burthen: 2400 port tonneaux
- Length: 59.8 m (196 ft)
- Beam: 16.2 m (53 ft)
- Height: 8.3 m (27 ft)
- Depth of hold: 7.83m
- Decks: 3
- Sail plan: Full-rigged ship
- Crew: 1,055 officers and men in 1780
- Armament: 110 guns

Invincible was a first-rate ship of the line of the French Royal Navy.

Built on plans by Francois Guillaume Clairin Deslauriers at Rochefort as part of the French naval mobilisation for the American War of Independence, she was a sister-ship of Royal Louis.

She was built within 13 month and completed in May 1780.

== American War of Independence ==
In 1781, stationed in the Antilles, she picked a British convoy. In 1782 she was ordered to Gibraltar, in Lamotte-Picquet's squadron. (Comte de la Motte was her captain April 1781–April 1783). She took part in the Battle of Cape Spartel, where she attacked the rear of the British squadron.

She was refitted several time (1781, 1784 and 1795) until her career came to an end in 1807 when she was disarmed and finally broken up in 1808 at Brest. Her replacement was the Commerce de Marseille of 118 guns.

Representations of Invincible
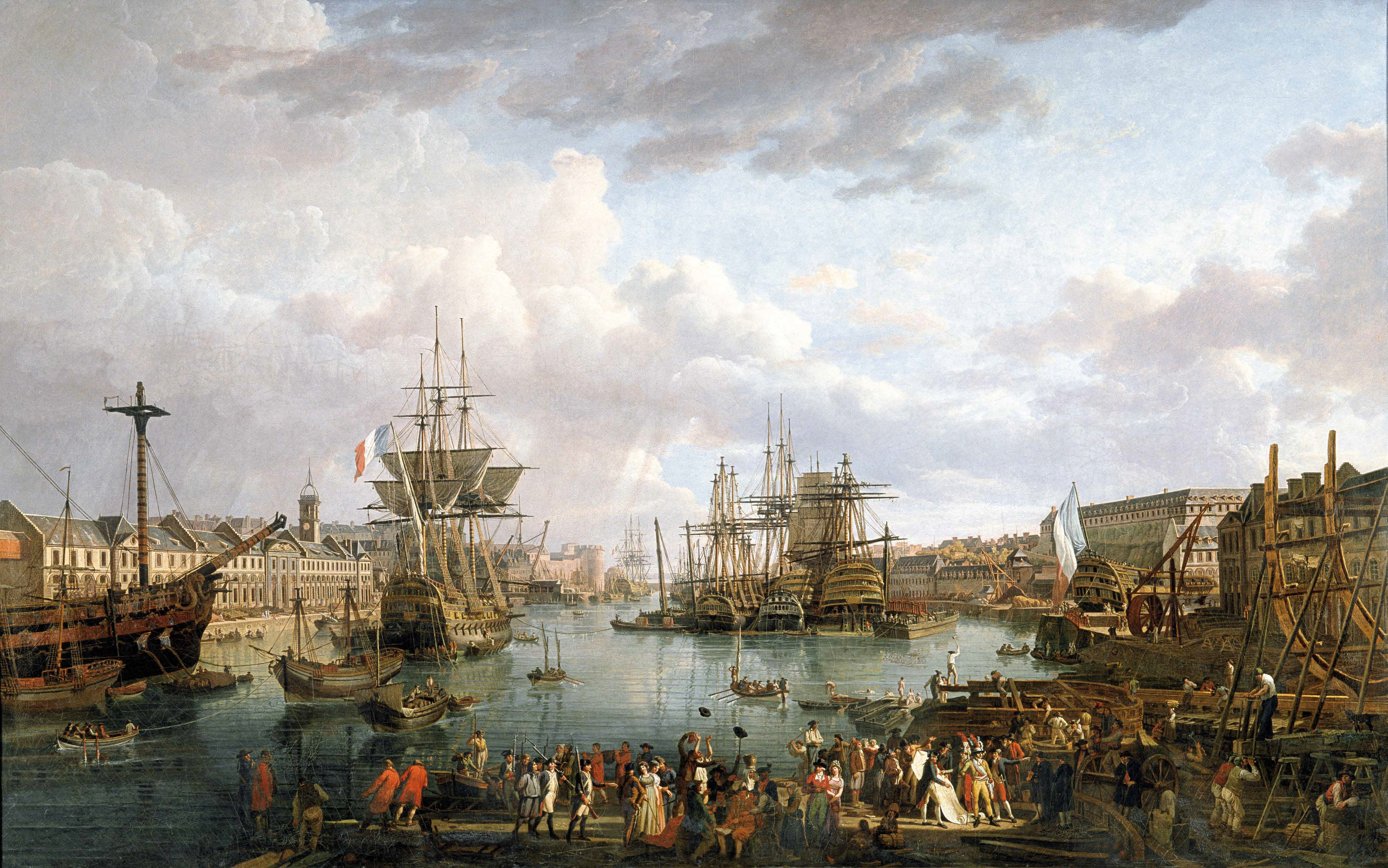
View of the Port of Brest by Jean-François Hue

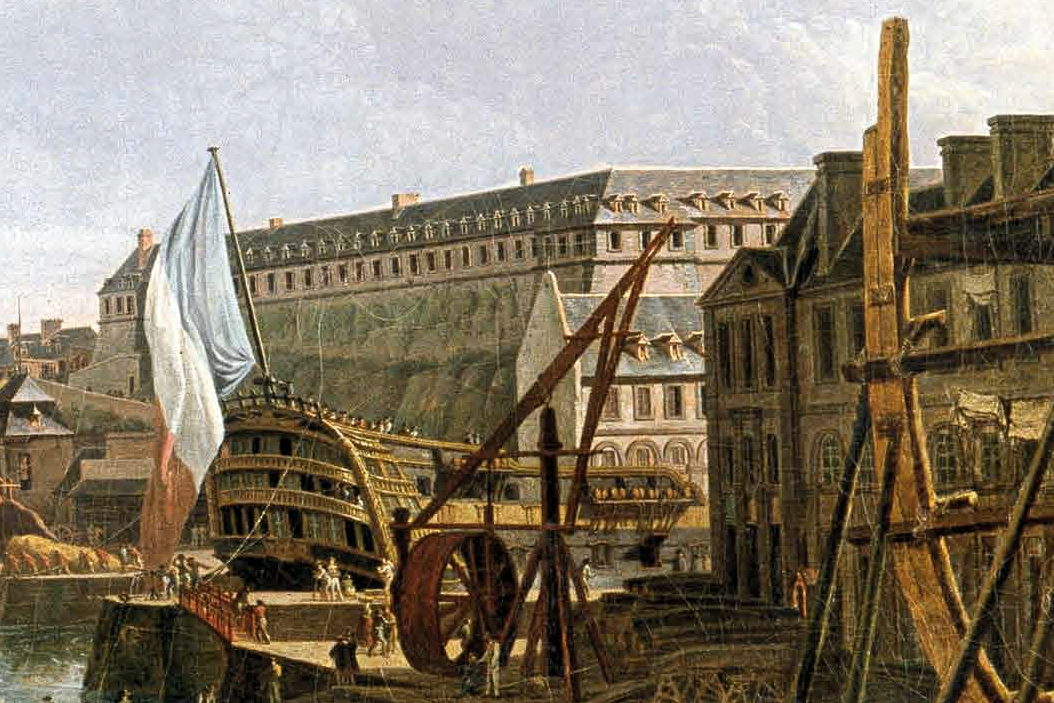
Invincible, details of Vue du port de Brest by Jean-François Hue

== Armament ==
=== Armament 1780 ===
Broadside Weight = 1104 French Livre (1191.4368 lbs 540.408 kg)
Lower Gun Deck: 30x French 36-Pounder
Middle Gun Deck: 32x French 24-Pounder
Upper Gun Deck: 30x French 12-Pounder

=== Armament 1781 ===
Broadside Weight = 1136 French Livre (1225.9712 lbs 556.072 kg)
Lower Gun Deck: 30x French 36-Pounder
Middle Gun Deck: 32x French 24-pound Carronade
Upper Gun Deck: 30x French 12-Pounder
Quarterdeck/Forecastle: 8x French 8-Pounder

=== Armament 1784 ===
Broadside Weight = 1168 French Livre (1260.5056 lbs 571.736 kg)
Lower Gun Deck: 30x French 36-Pounder
Middle Gun Deck:32x French 24-Pounder
Upper Gun Deck:30x French 12-Pounder
Quarterdeck/Forecastle:16x French 8-Pounder

=== Armament 1795 ===
Broadside Weight = 1252 French Livre (1351.1584 lbs 612.854 kg)
Lower Gun Deck: 30x French 36-Pounder
Middle Gun Deck: 32x French 24-Pounder
Upper Gun Deck:32x French 12-Pounder
Quarterdeck/Forecastle: 4x French 36-Pounder Obusier
Quarterdeck/Forecastle1: 6x French 8-Pounder
