= Armand-François Cillart de Suville =

French Navy officer

- Born: 1 February 1730 Séglien, France
- Died: 30 June 1801 (aged 71) Jersey
- Branch: French Navy
- Rank: contre-amiral
- Conflicts: American Revolutionary War; Battle of Grenada; Battle of Martinique; Battle of the Chesapeake; Battle of Cape Spartel

Armand-François Marie Cillart de Suville (Note: Often misspelt writes "Surville") (Séglien, 1 February 1730 — Jersey, 30 June 1801) was a French Navy officer who served in the American Revolutionary War.

== Early life ==
Cillart was born in an aristocratic family. His father was captain in a dragoon unit, and two of his brothers, Étienne-François de Cillart de Villeneuve and Jean-Marie de Villeneuve Cillart, also served in the Navy. Cillart joined the Navy as a Garde-Marine in 1746. During the Seven Years' War, he served on the 74-gun Robuste in 1759. He took part in the expedition to Newfoundland under Charles-Henri-Louis d'Arsac de Ternay on the frigate Licorne.

He was promoted to Lieutenant in 1771, and to Captain in 1777. In 1779, he was given command of the 64-gun Réfléchi, part of the White Squadron under Louis Guillouet. Cillart was wounded at the Battle of Grenada on 6 July 1779, and took part in the Battle of Martinique on 18 December 1779 under Lamotte-Picquet.

He later took part in the Battle of the Chesapeake on 5 September 1781.

In 1782, he was promoted to Brigadier. On 20 October, he commanded the 74-gun Actif at the Battle of Cape Spartel, under Admiral Córdova.

In 1786, he was promoted to Chef d'Escadre.

On 1 January 1792, he was promoted to contre-amiral.
