= Louis-André Beaussier de Chateauvert =

French Navy officer

- Born: 8 January 1725; Toulon, France
- Died: 21 May 1789 (aged 64); Paris, France
- Relatives: André Beaussier de Châteauvert; Pierre André Beaussier de Montauban; Louis-Joseph de Beaussier de l'Isle
- Military career
- Branch: French Navy
- Rank: Chef d'Escadre
- Conflicts: War of American Independence; Battle of Ushant

Louis-André Beaussier de Chateauvert (Toulon, 8 January 1725 — Paris, 21 May 1789) was a French Navy officer. He notably served during the War of American Independence.

== Biography ==
Chateauvert was born to Thérèse-Marie Giraudy de Piosin-Montauban and Chef d'Escadre André Beaussier de Châteauvert. His brother, Pierre André Beaussier de Montauban, uncle Louis-Joseph de Beaussier de l'Isle, and his grandfather were also Navy officers.

He joined the Navy as a Garde-Marine on 1 January 1741. He was promoted to Lieutenant on 11 February 1756, and to Commander in October 1764.

Chateauvert was promoted to Captain on 15 November 1771.

In 1778, Chateauvert captained the 74-gun Intrépide, part of the Blue squadron under Orléans and Lamotte-Picquet. He took part in the Battle of Ushant on 27 July 1778.

In 1779, Chateauvert commanded Intrépide in the Blue-with-white-cross squadron of the Armada of 1779.

In 1780 and 1781, Chateauvert was given command, in turn of the brand-new 106-gun Royal Louis, the 74-gun Robuste, and the 110-gun Terrible.

Chateauvert was promoted to Chef d'Escadre on 12 January 1782.

== Sources and references ==
Notes

Citations

References

- Chack, Paul (2001). Marins à bataille (in French). Vol. 1. Paris: Le Gerfaut. ISBN 9782901196921. OCLC 552986998.
- Lacour-Gayet, Georges (1905). La marine militaire de la France sous le règne de Louis XVI. Paris: Honoré Champion. OCLC 763372623.
- Taillemite, Étienne (1982). Dictionnaire des Marins français. Paris: Éditions maritimes et d'Outre-Mer. ISBN 9782707000316. OCLC 239744936.
- Troude, Onésime-Joachim (1867). Batailles navales de la France (in French). Vol. 2. Challamel ainé. OCLC 836362484.
