= Armand-Claude Poute de Nieuil =

French Navy officer

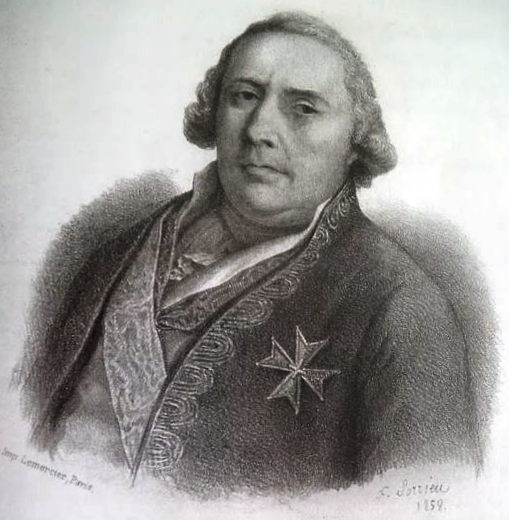
- Born: 22 July 1731
- Died: 19 April 1806 (aged 74) Poitier, France
- Branch: French Navy
- Rank: Contre-amiral
- Conflicts: War of American Independence; Battle of Martinique; Battle of Cape Spartel

Armand-Claude Poute de Nieuil (22 July 1731 — Poitier, 19 April 1806) was a French Navy officer. He served during the War of American Independence.

== Biography ==
Nieuil was born to Anne Louis de la Rochefoucauld and to Jean-Baptiste Poute de Nieuil.

Nieuil joined the Navy as a Garde-Marine on 22 January 1746. He was promoted to Ensign in 1751, to Lieutenant in 1757, and to captain in 1772. In 1776, he captained the 36-gun frigate Terpsichore, at Rochefort, in the squadron under Du Chaffault.

In 1788, the commanded the 70-gun Dauphin Royal, lead ship of the Second Division in the White-and-Blue squadron of the fleet under Orvilliers. He took part in the Battle of Ushant on 27 July 1778, earning Orvilliers' commendation.

In 1779, he transferred to 74-gun Citoyen, lead ship in the White-and-Blue squadron of Orvilliers' fleet. He kept her in 1780 under Guichen, and captained her at the Battle of Martinique on 17 April 1780.

In 1782, Nieuil commanded the 74-gun Robuste. He captained her at the Battle of Cape Spartel on 20 October 1782.

In 1784, Nieuil was promoted to Chef d'Escadre.

In 1787, Nieuil directed the Escadre d'évolution for a training cruise, with his flag on the 74-gun Superbe. He departed Brest in June and reached Lisbon before returning in August. The year after, Nieuil was cruising with a squadron off Tunis, with his flag on Illustre.

In 1788, he was made a Knight in the Order of Saint Louis. He commanded a division at Toulon in 1790. He rose to Contre-amiral in 1792.
