= Joseph Couturier de Fournoue =

French Navy officer of the War of American Independence

Joseph Couturier de Fournoue (Note: Also spelt writes "Fornoue") ( — 29 June 1801) was a French Navy officer. He served in the War of American Independence, earning a membership in the Society of Cincinnati and the knighthood in the Order of Saint Louis.

== Biography ==
Fournoue joined the Navy as a Garde-Marine on 25 February 1758. In 1759, he served in the frigate Aréthuse, and lost an arm. He was promoted to Lieutenant on 24 March 1772.

He was first officer on the 64-gun Vengeur, under Retz, and took part in the Battle of Rhode Island on 29 August 1778, the Battle of Grenada on 6 July 1779, and the Siege of Savannah in September and October 1779. He captained Vengeur in the Battle of Martinique on 18 December 1779.

Promoted to Captain on 4 April 1780, he was then given command of Vengeur. (Note: Retz was promoted to the command of the 74-gun Zodiaque.)

In June 1782, Fournoue captained the 64-gun Lion in the fleet under Córdova, taking part in the Battle of Cape Spartel.

On 28 October 1786, he married Jeanne-Marie de Montalembert.

In 1791, Fournoue was Chef de Division in the Indian station, with his flag on the 40-gun frigate Nymphe.

== Sources and references ==
Notes

Citations

Bibliography

- Contenson, Ludovic (1934). La Société des Cincinnati de France et la guerre d'Amérique (1778-1783). Paris: éditions Auguste Picard. OCLC 7842336.
- Viton de Saint-Allais, Nicolas (1875) [1817]. Nobiliaire universel de France ou recueil général des généalogies historiques des maisons nobles de ce royaume. Vol. 11. Paris: Bachelin-Deflorenne. p. 427.
- Lacour-Gayet, Georges (1905). La marine militaire de la France sous le règne de Louis XVI. Paris: Honoré Champion. OCLC 763372623.

External links

- Archives nationales (2011). "Fonds Marine, sous-série B/4: Campagnes, 1571-1785" (PDF).
