= Joseph de Flotte =

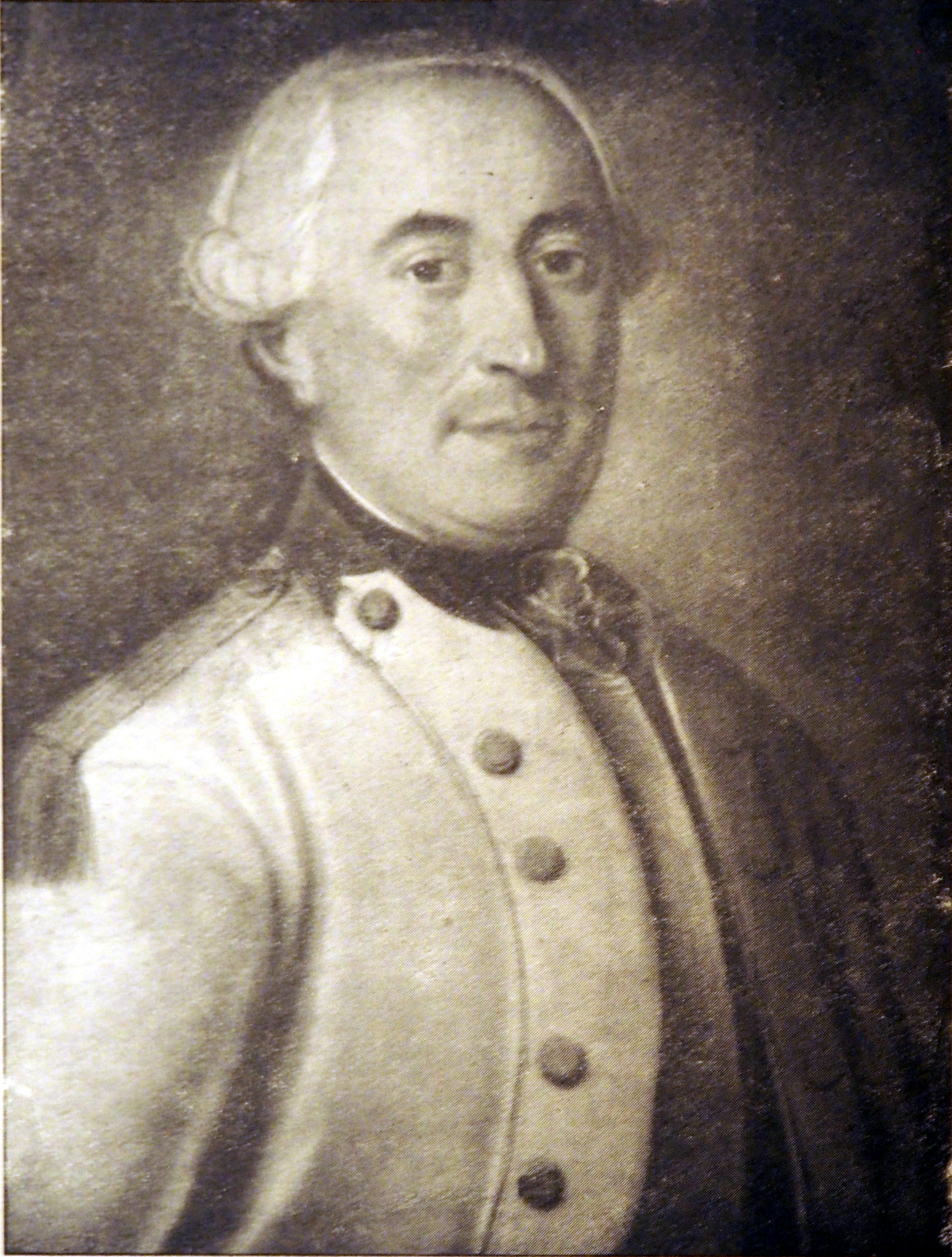
- Born: 11 March 1734; Saint-Pierre-d'Argençon, France
- Died: 10 September 1792 (aged 58) Toulon, France
- Branch: French Navy
- Rank: Contre-amiral
- Conflicts: Battle of Lagos; Battle of Martinique

Joseph de Flotte d'Argenson (11 March 1734 – 10 September 1792) was a French Navy officer. He served in the American Revolutionary War, earning a membership in the Society of Cincinnati and the Order of Saint Louis.

== Biography ==
Flotte was born in Saint-Pierre-d'Argençon on 11 March 1734, to an old noble family from Gap. In 1750, Flotte served as page to King Louis XV, and as lieutenant in the Régiment de Belzunce in 1753, before joining the French Navy as a Garde-Marine on 4 July 1754. He was part of the elite Garde du Pavillon.

In 1755, he served on the ship of the line Entreprenant for a mission to Canada in the squadron under Dubois de la Motte, and later the same year, on the frigate Galatée.

He was promoted to ensign in April 1756, and served in the eastern Mediterranean Sea. In July, he was appointed to the 64-gun Vaillant, under Choiseul, to support La Galissonière. He then served on the 66-gun Hercule from 9 November to 10 December 1757, and on Oriflamme from 30 January to 17 February 1758, although Oriflamme never managed to get a sufficient complement and cancelled her mission. He then served on the frigate Chimère, tasked with returning Turkish prisoners to Constantinople.

In 1759, he was on the 64-gun Modeste, and he took part in the Battle of Lagos on 18 and 19 August. Modeste attempted to seek shelter in neutral Portuguese waters, but British admiral Boscawen violated that neutrality and captured Modeste and Souverain. Flotte was taken prisoner but immediately released, and he returned to Toulon commanding the brig Saint Paul.

From 1759 to 1763, Flotte served on light units in the Mediterranean, escorting merchantmen and chasing Barbary corsairs. In 1763, he served on Pléïade for a raid against the Salé Rovers. Pléïade patrolled between Oran and Algiers, along with the xebecs Singe and Caméléon. On 15 July 1763, Singe mistakenly engaged a galiot from Algiers, which she mistook for a Salé rover. Pléïade intervened fired two broadsides into the galiot, which sank with the entire crew before the error was realised. This triggered a diplomatic incident and Captain Fabry had to negotiate a resolution to the crisis.

Flotte was promoted to lieutenant on 27 November 1765. he served on Singe under Suffren, and on Atalante, under Forbin d'Oppède, taking part in the Tunis expedition of 1770. In 1771, he was made a Knight in the Order of Saint-Louis. He cruised the Eastern Mediterranean on the frigate Mignonne between 1773 and 1774, again under Suffren.

On 29 September 1775, Flotte married his cousin Thérèse de Vitalis. Around that time, he started reading the works of Rousseau and adhering to the ideological framework of the Lumières.

In 1777, Flotte was given command of a company of naval riflemen on the 64-gun Fantasque, under Suffren, but that unit was replaced by a regular infantry and Flotte did not embark. He was then given his first command, the sloop Éclair.

On 3 October 1777, Éclair captured a merchantman laden with British goods, and on 22 October, a British privateer. In January 1778, while returning from escort duty, Éclair met three British ships, including one privateer. Seeing Éclair preparing to attack, the privateer retreated, leaving the two merchantmen unprotected. Éclair promptly captured them. Flotte gave chase to the privateer, but she was a better sailship and managed to escape. In March 1779, Flotte arrived at Toulon with his prizes, and wrote a report to Navy Minister Sartine, complete with suggestions to improve the speed of Éclair that his unsuccessful chase had inspired.

On 13 March 1779, Flotte was promoted to captain, and given command of the frigate Aurore. (Note: Both Moulin and Bonnichon mistake the frigate Aurore that Flotte captained with the unrelated private yacht Aurore of Courtanvaux, famous for her scientific voyage testing marine chronometers. The yacht was later purchased by the Navy as a corvette, but carried only 6 guns and bears no comparison with Flotte's frigate.) He took part in the blockade of Mahón, capturing a neutral Swedish merchantman and taking it to Toulon. The prize was found unlawful and released. Flotte then cruised off Algiers, where he captured four British privateers, which he brought to Toulon on 20 August. Flotte returned to Algiers, escorting a merchantman. While he was ashore paying a diplomatic visit to the dey, a four-ship British convoy appeared. Flotte hastily returned to Aurore and gave chase. She soon caught up with her quarries and brought them to Algiers. The British claimed that the capture had occurred in neutral waters and was therefore illegal. Algerian tribunals ruled in favour of the French.

In October, Aurore departed Marseille, escorting a 26-ship convoy bound for Martinique, ferrying supplies for the French colonies of the Caribbean Sea and for the division under Chef d'Escadre Lamotte-Picquet, as well as diplomat Gérard de Rayneval. On 30 November, off Mahón, he had to repel an attack by five British privateers. Arriving in Saint Lucia channel, the body of water between the islands of Saint Lucia and Martinique, the convoy met a 13-ship British squadron under Admiral Hyde Parker. The British gave chase, and Flotte opened fire, still out of range, as to warn the French forces at Martinique. Lamotte scrambled to cover the escape of the convoy, leading to the Battle of Martinique. After the battle, Governor Bouillé blamed Flotte for choosing Saint Lucie channel over Saint Dominique channel, and consequently Flotte was not among those distinguished for the action. Flotte's mission as captain of Aurore ended on 12 May 1780.

In 1781, Flotte was given command of the frigate Lutine, escorting convoys in the Eastern Mediterranean and calling Marseille, Malta, Smyrna and Foilleri. Lutine departed on 7 October, along with Pléïade and Montréal. She arrived at the Golden Horn on 10 November, where Pléïade detached to sail to Thessaloniki with a part of the convoy, and Montréal to Constantinople, while Lutine continued to Smyrna. After waiting for a return convoy to assemble, he departed for Toulon on 21 March, leading 69 merchantmen. Bad weather forced the convoy to seek shelter in Kolori harbour, near Athens.

At Athens, Flotte procured supplies for the crew of his convoy. Turkish officials then offered a number of sheep, and in the ensuing exchange of counter-gift, Flotte offered is watch and pistols, and was gifted an antique Classical Greek relief. He departed Athens on 7 May, called at Malta on 27, and arrived at Marseille in the evening of 20 June 1782. After returning to Toulon, Flotte reported the acquisition of the relief to Navy Minister Castries, (Note: The relief in question is now at Museum of Grenoble, Inv. 376.) who suggested presenting it to Louis XVI.

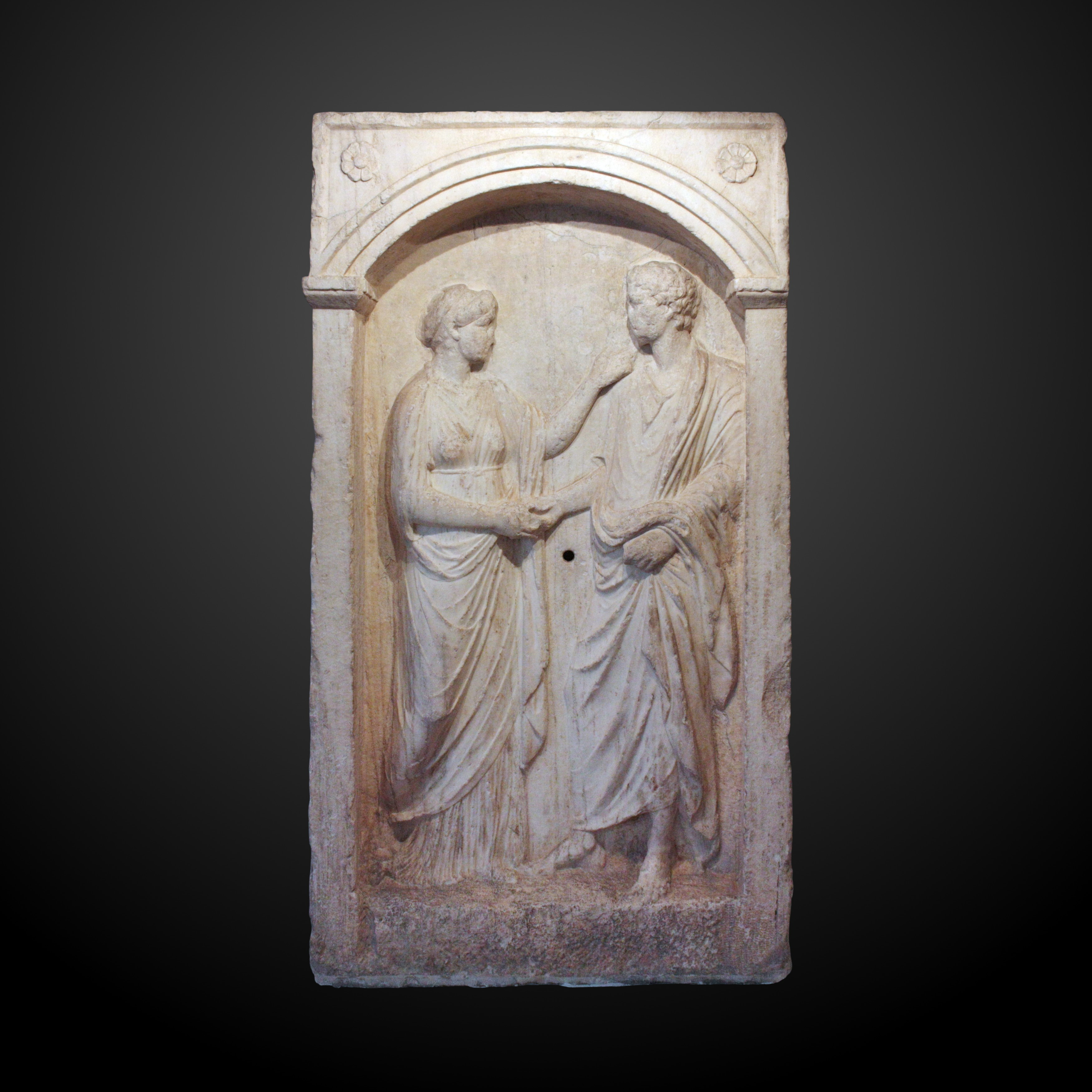
Attic funerary stele brought from Athens by Lutine under Flotte, Museum of Grenoble, Inv. 376.

In August 1782, Flotte was given command of the 74-gun Destin, succeeding Goimpy, and sailed to Cádiz to reinforce the fleet under Córdova. He led a division comprising the 64-gun Provence and Éveillé, and the frigate Précieuse.

Flotte was promoted to Brigadier on 1 January 1785. He was given command of the 20-gun corvette Favorite in the Escadre d'évolution, and was present at Cherbourg naval base when Louis XVI visited it in April 1786.

Flotte was promoted to Chef de Division in May 1786. He became the commander of the French division off Western Africa until 1787, with his flag on the 40-gun Junon. The division also comprised the frigate Cérès and the cutter Malin, under Lieutenant d'Orvilliers. (Note: Orvillier was son to Vice-Admiral d'Orvilliers.) He departed Rochefort on 14 November 1786. Soon afterwards, a nine-day storm scattered the division. Cérès and Junon regrouped on 21, but Malin did not reappear. She had been wrecked in the Bay of Biscay. From January 1787, Flotte made efforts to develop slaving outposts and factories on the coast, but failed. He returned to Toulon after 85 days, on 8 September 1787.

By 1 October 1789, Flotte was at Toulon, under Albert de Rions, as general officer commanding the Navy at the base. Flotte lead the second Division of the Seventh Squadron. The life of the workers of the arsenal was dire: their pay very low, they were liable to find employment only one out of two or three days, and due to the financial crisis they were also often paid only with delay. The bad harvest of 1789 and harsh winter that year compounded the issue by raising prices, and the ensuing misery yielded unrest. Albert de Rions reacted with rigidity and scorn, alienating the workers, and in December, a riot let to his transfer to Brest. Flotte, who had a reputation as a Liberal, replaced him as commander of the naval forces stationed at Toulon.

Flotte was promoted to Contre-amiral on 1 July 1792. On 10 September 1792, rioting workers of the port seized Flotte and hanged him, next to the door of Toulon arsenal.
