= Battle of Cape Spartel =

1782 battle of the American Revolutionary War

- Part of the American Revolutionary War
- Richard Howe's fleet relieving Gibraltar nine days before the battle
Date	20 October 1782
Location	Off Cape Spartel, Atlantic Ocean 35.9257°N 5.9109°W
Result	Inconclusive

Belligerents
Great Britain	Spain; France

Commanders and leaders
Richard Howe	Luis de Córdova

Strength
34 ships of the line; 1 frigate	34 ships of the line

Casualties and losses
63 killed; 198 wounded	360 killed or wounded

The Battle of Cape Spartel was an indecisive naval battle between a Franco-Spanish fleet under Admiral Luis de Córdova y Córdova and a British fleet under Admiral of the Blue Richard Howe. These forces met on 20 October 1782 after Howe successfully resupplied Gibraltar, then under siege by Bourbon forces during the American Revolutionary War.

== Background ==
When Spain entered the American War of Independence in 1779, one of its principal objectives was the capture of Gibraltar from Great Britain. Shortly after war was declared, forces of Spain and France began the Great Siege of Gibraltar, blockading land access to the peninsula and enacting a somewhat porous naval blockade. Britain successfully resupplied Gibraltar in both 1780 and 1781, and recognized the need to do so again in 1782. The matter was seen as critical by British political and military leaders because Spain was seeking cession of the territory in peace talks.

The British Channel Fleet, which was under the command of Admiral of the Blue Richard Howe, had a number of conflicting objectives to manage in the summer 1782. In addition to protecting the English Channel from Franco-Spanish incursions, the fleet also had to deal with the possibility of Dutch action on the North Sea against the transport of critical naval supplies from the Baltic, and it was expected to protect the convoy that would resupply Gibraltar. Even though intelligence received on 25 August indicated the Dutch fleet was in port at Texel, ten ships of the line were despatched to the North Sea while the convoy for Gibraltar took shape at Spithead. These ships returned to port on 4 September.

The convoy that sailed on 11 September included 35 ships of the line, a large convoy of transports destined for Gibraltar, and additional convoys destined for the East and West Indies. Howe's orders were to deliver the supplies to Gibraltar and then to return to England. Because of bad weather and contrary winds, the fleet destined for Gibraltar did not arrive at Cape St. Vincent until 9 October.

The Franco-Spanish fleet tasked with the blockade of Gibraltar was anchored in Bay of Gibraltar. It consisted of 49 ships of the line, and was under the command of Spanish Admiral Luis de Córdova. The Spanish ships (numbering 35) were not in good condition. On 10 October a storm wrought havoc on the allied fleet: one ship of the line was driven aground, another was sent under Gibraltar's guns, and a third was swept through the Straits of Gibraltar into the Mediterranean.

Howe met with all of his captains, and gave detailed instructions for ensuring the safe arrival of the transports. On 11 October the transports began entry into the straits, followed by covering fleet. Four transports successfully anchored at Gibraltar, but the remainder were carried by the strong currents into the Mediterranean. The fleet followed. Taking advantage of a west-northwest wind, de Córdova's fleet sailed in pursuit, while the Spanish admiral sent his smaller vessels to shadow the British. The British regrouped about 50 miles east of Gibraltar off the Spanish coast on 13 October, but sailed south toward the Moroccan coast upon the approach of the allied fleet. With a fair wind on the 15th, the British reentered the straits, and successfully brought the convoy into Gibraltar between the 16th and 18th.

== Battle ==
On 19 October the allied fleet was sighted to the east of Gibraltar. Howe, seeking to avoid battle in the straits, weighed anchor and sailed west, with the allies following. Once clear of the straits, he reduced the fleet's sails, offering de Córdova, who held the weather gage, the option of engaging in battle. On the 20th, de Córdova signalled 'general chase', disregarding division places. The British line of battle was to starboard of the Franco-Spanish. At around 1 pm, and after Cordova's flagship, the 120-gun Santísima Trinidad reached the centre of the combined line, both fleets were about two miles apart. The British reduced sail in order to tighten their line of battle. At 5:45 the van of the Franco-Spanish fleet opened fire. The British returned fire, while Howe signalled 'retreat all sail', making at least 14 Franco-Spanish ships redundant, among them two three-deckers. No British ships were really engaged, despite the efforts of de Córdova's ships, which chased the British fleet. On the 21st, both fleets were some 12 miles apart. De Córdova made repairs and was ready to resume the action. However, no battle took place the next day as Howe had sailed back to Britain in line with his orders.

== Aftermath ==
Howe succeeded in his main aim, ensuring that the convoy arrived safely, and returned to England. The success in resupplying the hard pressed garrison at Gibraltar ensured its survival at a time when British forces were suffering a demoralising succession of losses at Minorca, Florida and the West Indies. The timely resupply combined with the failed Franco-Spanish attack of 13 September on Gibraltar also greatly strengthened the British hand at peace talks begun earlier in October. British diplomats steadfastly refused to part with Gibraltar, despite offers by Spain to trade most of its gains.

The sailing qualities of their ships (in particular the use of copper sheathing) enabled the British to decline an action. The Spanish Navy struggled to build faster ships to avoid these situations such as that of the Battle of Cape St. Vincent – the Moonlight Battle – two years before, when Rodney's coppered 18-ship fleet chased down and engaged de Lángara's 11-ship fleet. The Spanish Navy had been slow to begin coppering its own vessels. It was also limited by the slow speed of some of its older and heavier ships, like the Santisima Trinidad.

== Order of battle ==
=== British (Howe) ===
34 ships of the line (according to Schomberg)

Admiral Richard Howe's fleet
Van – First division
Ship	Rate	Guns	Commander	Casualties			Notes
Ship	Rate	Guns	Commander	Killed	Wounded	Total	Notes
HMS Goliath	Third rate	74	Captain Hyde Parker	4	16	20	
HMS Ganges	Third rate	74	Captain Charles Fielding	6	23	29	
HMS Prince	First rate	100	Captain John Carter Allen	2	13	15	
HMS Britannia	First rate	100	Vice-Admiral Samuel Barrington; Captain Benjamin Hill	8	13	21	Flagship of the van
HMS Atlas	Second rate	98	Captain George Vandeput	2	3	5	
HMS Ruby	Third rate	64	Captain John Collins	6	0	6	
Van – Second division
HMS Panther	Fourth rate	60	Captain Henry Hervey	3	15	18	
HMS Foudroyant	Third rate	80	Captain John Jervis	4	8	12	
HMS Edgar	Third rate	74	Commodore William Hotham; Captain William Cayley	0	6	6	
HMS Polyphemus	Third rate	64	Captain William Finch	0	4	4	
HMS Suffolk	Third rate	74	Captain Sir George Home	0	0	0	
HMS Vigilant	Third rate	64	Captain John Douglas	1	2	3	
Centre – First division
HMS Courageux	Third rate	74	Captain Lord Mulgrave	1	4	5	
HMS Crown	Third rate	64	Captain Samuel Reeve	0	1	1	
HMS Alexander	Third rate	74	Captain Lord Longford	2	4	6	
HMS Sampson	Third rate	64	Captain John Harvey	2	0	2	
HMS Princess Royal	Second rate	98	Captain Jonathan Faulknor	1	0	1	
HMS Victory	First rate	100	Admiral of the Blue Viscount Howe; Captain John Leveson-Gower; Captain Henry Duncan	0	0	0	Fleet flagship
Centre – Second division
HMS Blenheim	Second rate	90	Captain Adam Duncan	2	3	5	
HMS Asia	Third rate	64	Captain Richard Rodney Bligh	0	0	0	
HMS Egmont	Third rate	74	Captain James Fergusson	0	0	0	
HMS Queen	Second rate	98	Rear-Admiral Alexander Hood; Captain William Domett	1	4	5	
HMS Bellona	Third rate	74	Captain Richard Onslow	0	0	0	
Rear – Second division
HMS Raisonnable	Third rate	64	Captain Lord Hervey	1	0	1	
HMS Fortitude	Third rate	64	Captain George Keppel	2	9	11	
HMS Princess Amelia	Second rate	84	Rear-Admiral Sir Richard Hughes; Captain John Reynolds	4	5	9	
HMS Berwick	Third rate	74	Captain Hon. Charles Phipps	1	5	6	
HMS Bienfaisant	Third rate	64	Captain John Howarth	2	4	6	
Rear – First division
HMS Dublin	Third rate	74	Captain Archibald Dickson	0	0	0	
HMS Cambridge	Second rate	84	Captain Hon. Keith Stewart	4	6	10	
HMS Ocean	Second rate	98	Vice-Admiral Mark Milbanke; Captain Richard Boger	0	0	0	Flagship of the rear
HMS Union	Second rate	90	Captain John Dalrymple	5	15	20	
HMS Captain	Fourth rate	60	Captain John Holloway	6	16	22	
HMS Vengeance	Third rate	74	Captain John Moutray	2	14	16	
Attached frigates
HMS Latona	Fifth rate	38	Captain Hon. Hugh Seymour-Conway	0	0	0	
63 killed, 198 wounded

=== Franco-Spanish (De Cordova y Cordova) ===
46 ships of the line

Spanish

- Santísima Trinidad (120), Flagship, Teniente-General Luis de Córdova
- Rayo (80), Jefe d'Escadra Antonio Posada
- San Vicente Ferrer (80), Brigadier Ignacio Ponce de León
- Terrible (74)
- Arrogante (70)
- Brillante (70)
- Firme (70)
- Galicia (70)
- Guerrero (70)
- San Isidoro (70)
- San Isidro (70)
- San Joaquín (70)
- San Juan Bautista (70)
- San Justo (70)
- San Lorenzo (70)
- San Rafael (70)
- Santa Isabel (70)
- Serio (70)
- Triunfante (70)
- Vencedor (70)
- Castilla (64)
- España (64)
- Septentrión (64)

French

- Bretagne (110)
- Invincible (110), Lieutenant General Picquet de la Motte
- Majestueux (110), Lieutenant General Viscount De Rochecouart
- Royal Louis (110), Chef d'Escadre Antoine-Hilarion de Beausset
- Actif (74), Cillart de Surville
- Dictateur (74)
- Guerrier (74)
- Robuste (74), Captain Marquez de Nieuil
- Suffisant (74)
- Zodiaque (74)
- Indien (64)

The following ships were unable to take any part in the action:

Spanish

- Purísima Concepción (112), Teniente-Général Juan Bautista Bonet
- San Fernando (80), Teniente-General Miguel Gastón
- Africa (70)
- Oriente (70)
- San Eugenio (70)
- San Julián (70)
- Astuto (54)
- Miño (54)

French

- Terrible (110), Lieutenant General Count de Guichen
- Bien-Aimé (74)
- Atlas (70)
- Lion (64), Captain Fournoue
