= Poitou (disambiguation) =

Poitou is a former and historical province of France.

Poitou may also refer to:

== Places ==
- County of Poitou, a former and historical county of France
- Poitou Marsh, Nouvelle-Aquitaine, France; a marsh
  - Gulf of Poitou, that became the Poitou Marsh

=== Facilities and structures ===
- Palace of the Counts of Poitou, Poitiers, Poitou, France

== People ==
- Seneschal of Poitou, the administrator for the province of Poitou
- Count of Poitou, the noble title for the county of Poitou
- House of Poitou, a noble house of Aquitaine, France

=== Persons ===
- Adelaide of Poitou (952–1004), Queen of the Franks
- Georges Poitou (1926–1989), French mathematician
- Philip of Poitou (died 1208), Bishop of Durham
- Raymond of Poitou (1105–1149), Prince of Antioch
- Roger de Poitou (died 1140), Anglo-Norman aristocrat

== Other uses ==
- Escadron de Transport 3/61 Poitou (English: 3/61 transport squadron "Poitou"), French aerospace squadron based in Orleans
- Poitou donkey (the Poitou; French: baudet poitevine; baudet de Poitou; English: Poitevin donkey; Baudet de Poitou), a French breed of donkey
- Poitou goat (the Poitou; French: chèvre poitevine; English: Poitevin goat), a French breed of goat
- Poitou goose (the Poitou; French: oie poitevine; oie de Poitou; English: Poitevin goose), a French breed of goose; see List of goose breeds
- Poitou mule (the Poitou; French: mule poitevine; English: Poitevin mule), a French crossbred mule

== See also ==
- Poitou–Tate duality, in algebraic number fields
- Poitou-Charentes, a former region of France
- Rex du Poitou rabbit, a French breed of rabbit
- Poitiers (disambiguation)
