= French ship Réfléchi (1776) =

Ship of the line of the French Navy

History

France
- Name: Réfléchi
- Builder: Rochefort
- Laid down: May 1772
- Launched: 25 November 1776
- Commissioned: February 1777
- Out of service: 1793
- Fate: Broken up

General characteristics
- Class & type: Solitaire-class ship of the line
- Displacement: 2,200 tonneaux
- Tons burthen: 1,090 port tonneaux
- Length: 50 m (164 ft 1 in)
- Beam: 13.3 m (43 ft 8 in)
- Draught: 6.5 m (21 ft 4 in)
- Propulsion: Sails
- Sail plan: Full-rigged ship
- Armament: 26×24-pounder long guns; 28×12-pounder long guns; 10×6-pounder long guns

Réfléchi was a 64-gun Solitaire-class ship of the line of the French Navy.

== Career ==
In 1779, Réfléchi was under Captain Cillart de Suville and part of the White squadron (centre) of the fleet under Orvilliers.

Réfléchi took part in the Battle of Martinique on 18 December 1779, when she, along with Annibal and Vengeur, saved a convoy from the British off Fort Royal. She was part of the French squadron at the action of 20 March 1780 when she fought Parker's squadron off Saint Domingue, along with Diadème, Amphion and Annibal, and was present at the Battle of the Chesapeake.

From 20 August to 28 December 1783, she was at the Martinique station under Captain Du Bois.

She became a hulk at Brest in November 1788, and was broken up around 1793 after having been renamed Turot.
