= French ship Vengeur (1765) =

64-gun ship of the line of the French Navy

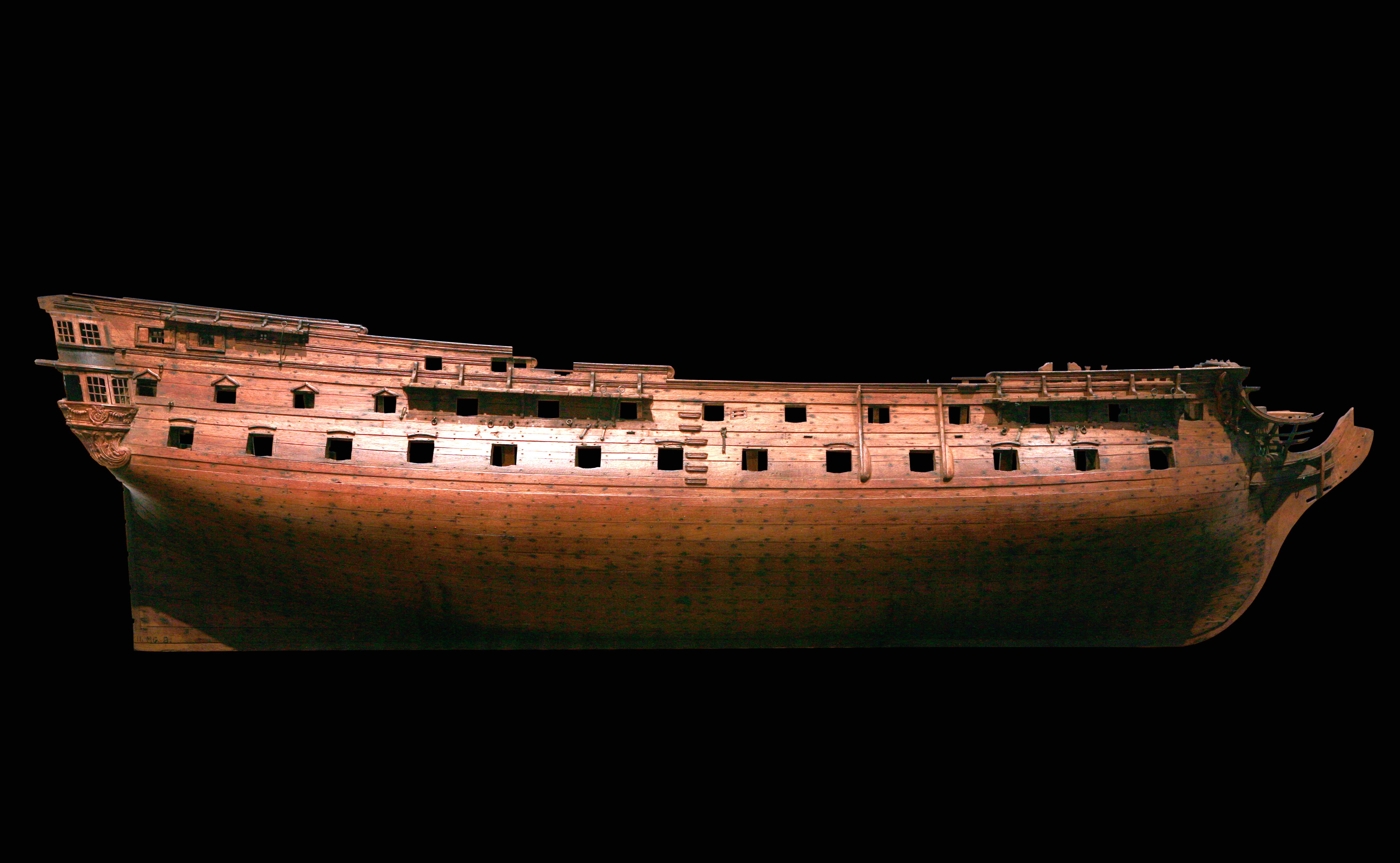

History

France
- Name: Vengeur
- Namesake: "Avenger"
- Owner: French East India Company
- Builder: Lorient, Caudan
- Laid down: May 1756
- Launched: 25 October 1756
- In service: February 1757
- Out of service: 11 July 1764 in Lorient
- Fate: Sold to the French navy

France
- Name: Vengeur
- Namesake: "Avenger"
- Owner: French Navy
- Acquired: July 1765
- Decommissioned: February 1784
- Stricken: April 1784
- Fate: Wrecked in March 1785

General characteristics
- Class & type: 64-gun ship of the line
- Displacement: 2350 tonneaux
- Tons burthen: 1250 port tonneaux
- Length: 48 m (157 ft 6 in)
- Beam: 12.34 m (40 ft 6 in)
- Draught: 5.2 m (17 ft 1 in)
- Complement: 396 men
- Armament: 64 guns: Lower battery: 24 × 24-pounder long guns; Upper battery: 28 × 12-pounder long guns; Quarterdeck: 6 × 6-pounder long guns; Forecaste: 2 × 6-pounder long guns

Vengeur was a 64-gun ship of the line of the French Navy designed by Antoine Groignard. She saw action with Bailli de Suffren during the American War of Independence.

== Career ==
Vengeur was originally built as an East Indiaman for the French East India Company, by Antoine Groignard. Her plans, however, followed military specification, as she was supposed to be able to integrate a naval squadron if necessary. She cruised as a merchantman from 1757 to 1765, when she was sold to the Navy. After a refit in Brest, she was brought into service under Captain Christy de La Pallière.

In October 1778, along with the frigate Belle Poule, she captured the privateer St Peters.

She took part in the Battle of Rhode Island on 29 August 1778, the Battle of Grenada on 6 July 1779, and the Siege of Savannah in September and October 1779, under Captain Croiset de Retz. She then took part in the Battle of Martinique on 18 December 1779 under Fournoue, when she, along with Annibal and Réfléchi, saved a convoy from the British off Fort Royal, and in the Battle of Martinique on 17 April 1780.

Incorporated into Suffren's squadron, she was present at the Battle of Porto Praya under Comte de Forbin, although she did not take part in the action. She was similarly present at the Battle of Negapatam, there as well failed to take part in the action. In July 1782, in the wake of the Battle of Negapatam, Suffren appointed Cuverville to Vengeur in replacement of Forbin (Lieutenant Périer de Salvert replaced Cuverville on his old ship, Flamand).

At the Battle of Trincomalee, between 25 August and 3 September 1782, Vengeur caught fire, causing alarm to the ships around her. She left the French line of battle, which contributed to disorganizing it. She took part in the Battle of Cuddalore on 20 June 1783 under Captain de Cuverville.

== Fate ==
Vengeur was sold to commerce in April 1784, and wrecked off La Réunion in March 1785.
