= Battle of Martinique (1779) =

1779 battle of the American Revolutionary War

- Part of the American Revolutionary War
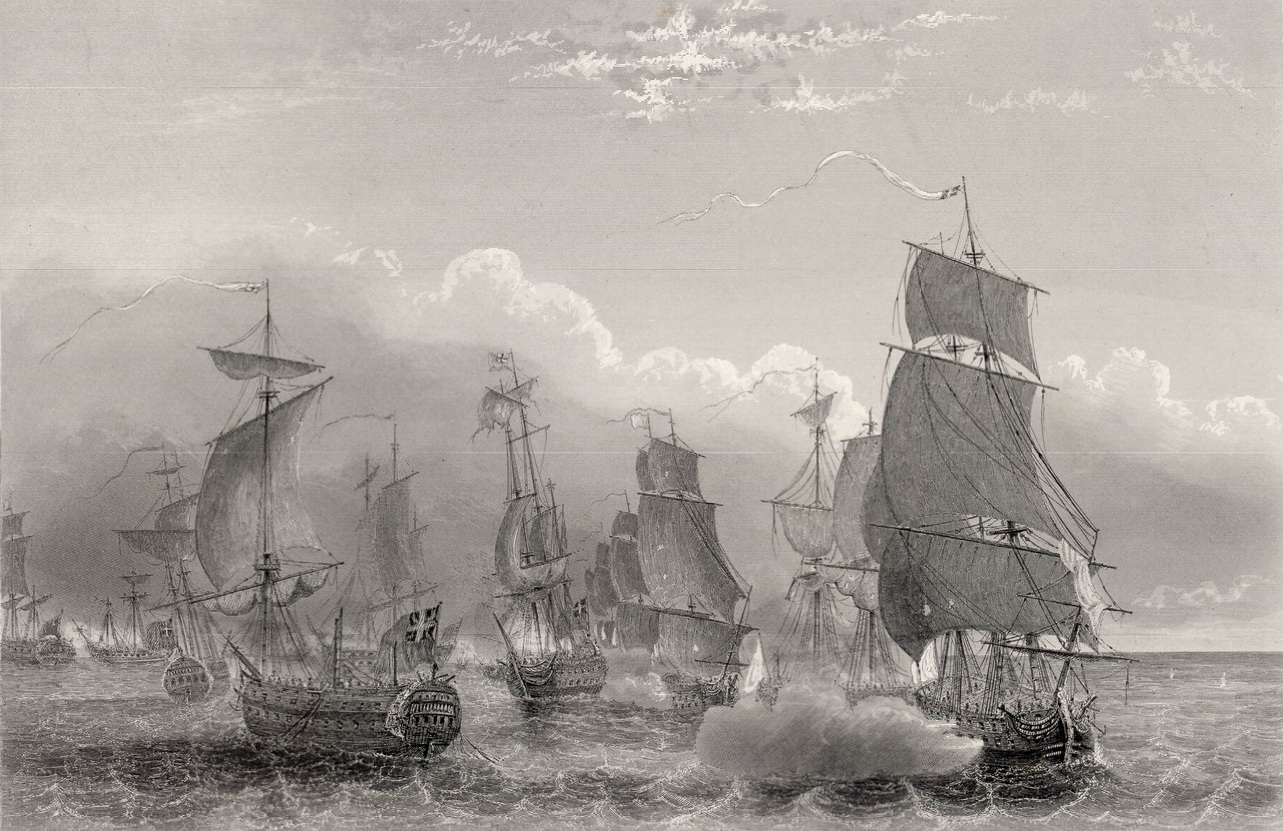
- 1850 engraving of the battle
Date	18 December 1779
Location	Off Martinique, Caribbean Sea 14°35′N 61°09′W
Result	British victory

Belligerents
Great Britain	France

Commanders and leaders
Hyde Parker	Picquet la Motte

Strength
13 ships of the line	3 ships of the line 26 merchant ships

Casualties and losses
150 killed or wounded	9 merchant ships captured 4 merchant ships destroyed

The Battle of Martinique was a naval encounter on 18 December 1779 between a British 13-ship squadron under Admiral Hyde Parker and a three-ship French division under Admiral Lamotte-Picquet near the island of Martinique in the West Indies. In order to cover the retreat of a convoy under Joseph de Flotte chased by the British, the lone 74-gun Annibal, under Lamotte-Picquet. For 90 minutes, Annibal single-handedly engaged the British squadron to block its advance, before she was joined by the two 64-guns, Vengeur and Réfléchi. Ten to 11 of the transports were taken by the British or beached themselves to avoid capture, but the rest of the convoy of the escorting frigate Aurore managed to escape, and the division returned to its anchorage. Hyde Parker wrote Lamotte-Picquet a congratulation letter in the following days.

== Background ==
In the autumn of 1779, a British fleet under Admiral Hyde Parker was anchored at St. Lucia, which the British had captured a year before in the Capture of St. Lucia. Parker was awaiting the arrival of Admiral George Brydges Rodney, who was to lead the 1780 campaign, and his fleet was largely at rest, with crews ashore and repairs being made to some vessels.

Meanwhile, the French Caribbean division, under Chef d'Escadre Lamotte-Picquet, was undergoing a refit at the nearby island of Martinique in the West Indies. The division comprised eight ships of the line, but in December 1779 only three were operational: the 74-gun Annibal, and the 64-guns, Vengeur, under Fournoue, and Réfléchi, under Cillart de Suville.

== Battle ==
In the morning of 18 December, a French convoy under Joseph de Flotte, which had departed Marseille in October and was bound for Martinique, arrived in Saint Lucia channel, the body of water between the islands of Saint Lucia and Martinique. The convoy brought supplies for the French colonies of the Caribbeans and for the division under Lamotte, as well as diplomat Gérard de Rayneval. It comprised 26 transports, escorted by the lone 34-gun frigate Aurore.

Around 0800, HMS Preston, which was stationed in Saint Lucia channel, gave a signal indicating the arrival of an unknown fleet. Parker immediately scrambled, and managed to get five ships of the line and a 50-gun frigate out to meet the arriving fleet. Shortly thereafter, the French observation post of Les Anses-d'Arlet signaled the arrival of Flotte's convoy, as well as 15 British warships chasing them.

Flotte sailed his ships close to shore, hoping that the shallow waters would deter the British warships from approaching, and Aurore fell back to start a rear-guard action as to delay Hyde Parker's squadron, and alert the French forces of Martinique. The lead ships of the convoy passed Les Anses-d'Arlet around 1400. Lamotte then scrambled his ships to cover the retreat of the convoy, mustering reinforcements for his crew from the crews of the ships under repairs, as well as volunteers from the population. (Note: Seven years later, Lamotte stated that volunteers were so eager to take part in the action that they would try to pay for it.)

Lamotte left the anchorage at Fort Royal with his flagship, the 74-gun Annibal. As his arrival was to the windward, he was able to cover the arrival of the remaining convoy ships. The British fleet, with HMS Conqueror in the lead, began beating against the wind to closing with the French fleet. By 1700, Conqueror came with the range of Annibal's guns, and battle was engaged between those two. Annibal found herself facing seven British ships for half an hour, before the 64-gun Vengeur and Réfléchi joined her. By that time, the 15 British ships were also engaged. The reinforced French crew allowed Lamotte's ships to sustain an especially high rate of fire, Annibal in particular firing alternatively from both broadsides as she turned to face the British from both sides.

By the time evening arrived, HMS Albion had also come within range, but the action had worked its way toward shoals near Fort Royal. The coastal defences at Pointe des Nègres and Gros Îlet started firing of the British. Parker finally called his fleet off at 1845, but one last broadside from the French fleet took the life of Conqueror's captain, Walter Griffith.

== Aftermath ==
The loss to the French convoy was significant with thirteen ships captured or driven ashore. Parker was however satisfied with his squadrons conduct and the prizes captured but was also with the French. La Motte's conduct during the battle impressed Hyde Parker sufficiently to make him send a congratulatory letter to his adversary when they had occasion to communicate via a truce flag:

The conduct of your Excellency in the affair of the 18th of this month fully justifies the reputation which you enjoy among us, and I assure you that I could not witness without envy the skill you showed on that occasion. Our enmity is transient, depending upon our masters; but your merit has stamped upon my heart the greatest admiration for yourself.

Lamotte was made a Commander in the Order of Saint Louis.

The French Crown commissioned a painting from Rossel de Cercy to celebrate the action. The painting is an oil on canvas from 1779 to 1790, 114.0 cm high and 144.5 cm wide, in the collections of the Château de Versailles (inventory number MV 7388). The painting is now on display at the Musée national de la Marine.

Naval battle in the harbour of Fort Royal in Martinique, December 18, 1779, by Rossel de Cercy
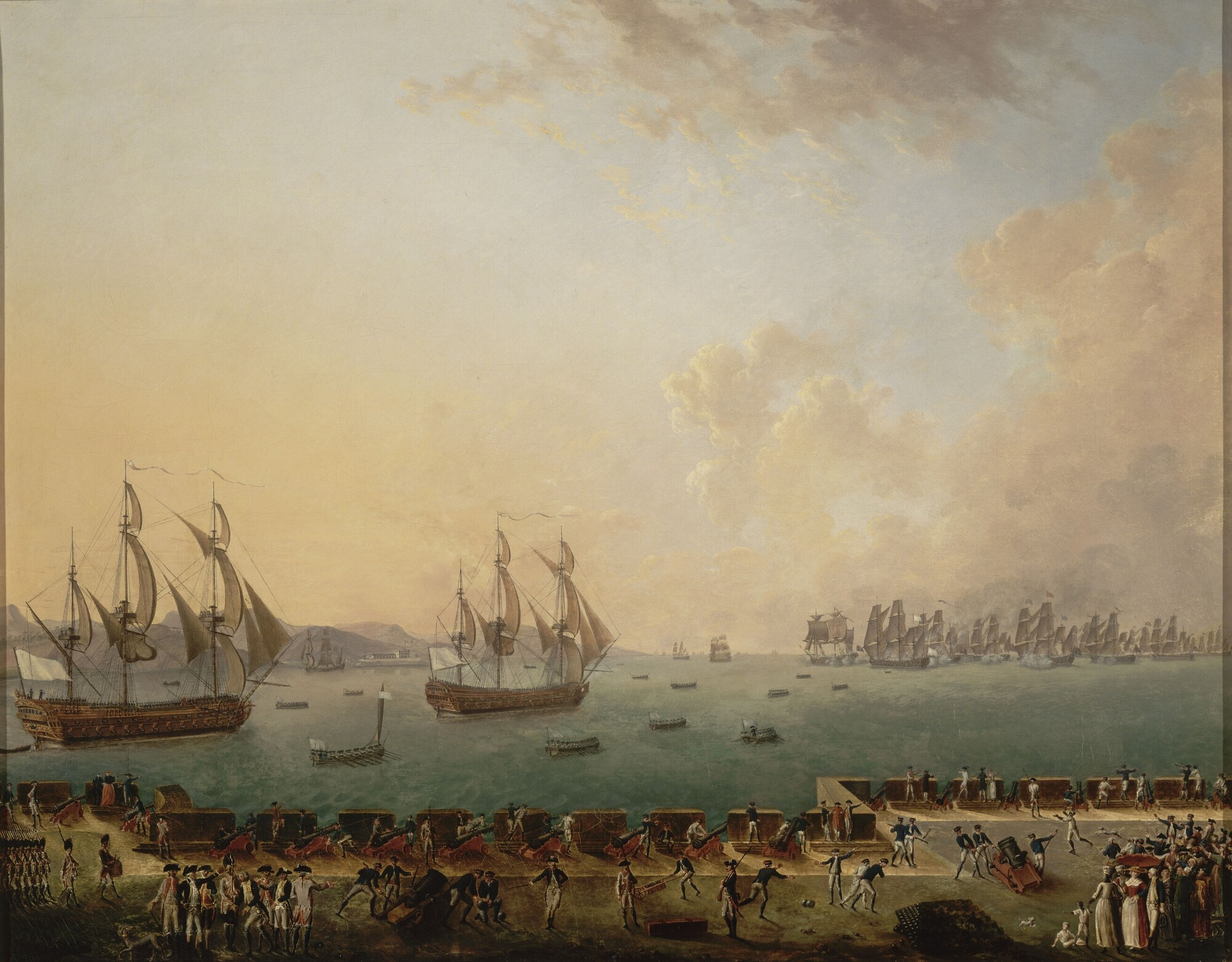
overview

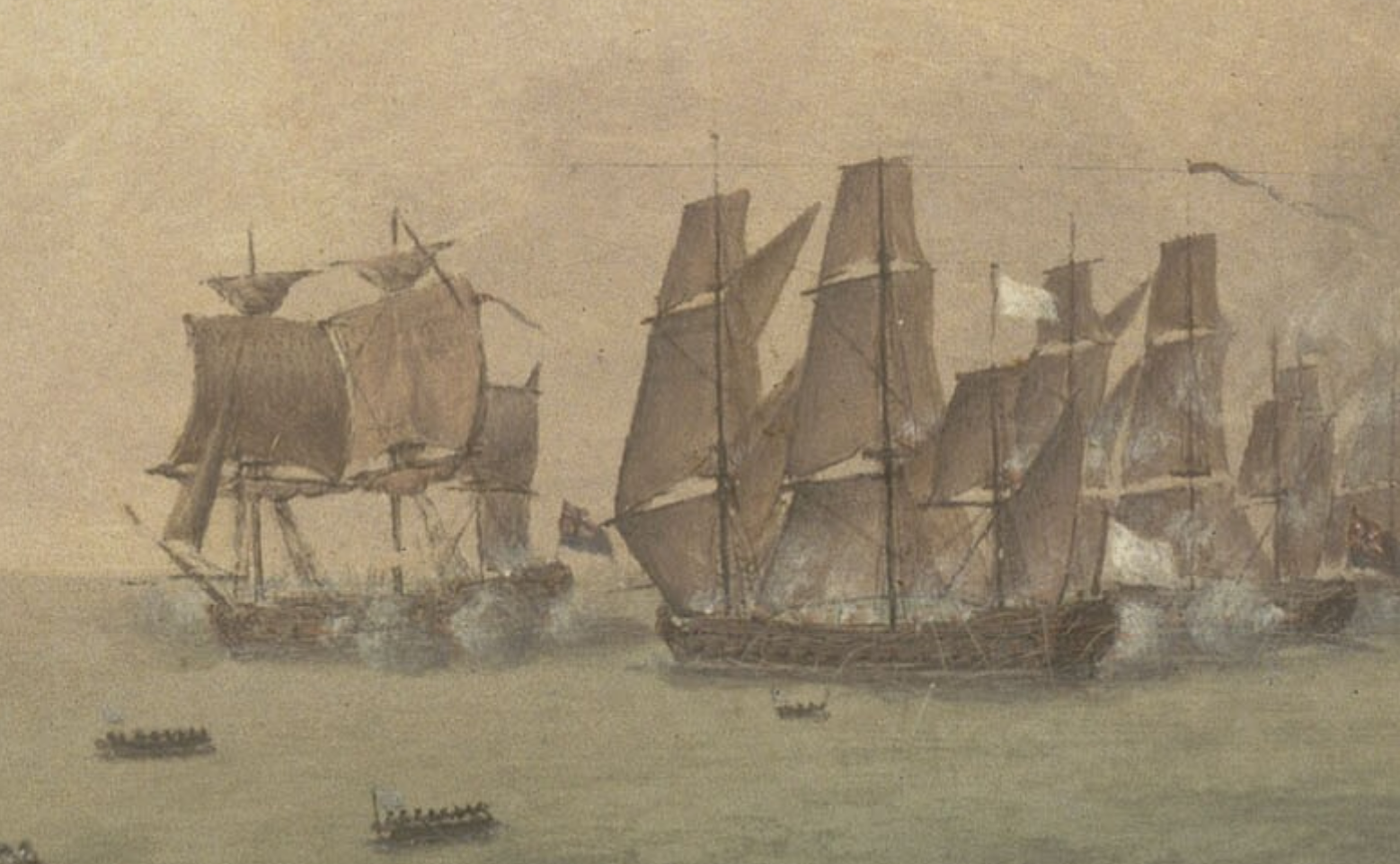
Detail of Annibal delaying the British squadron

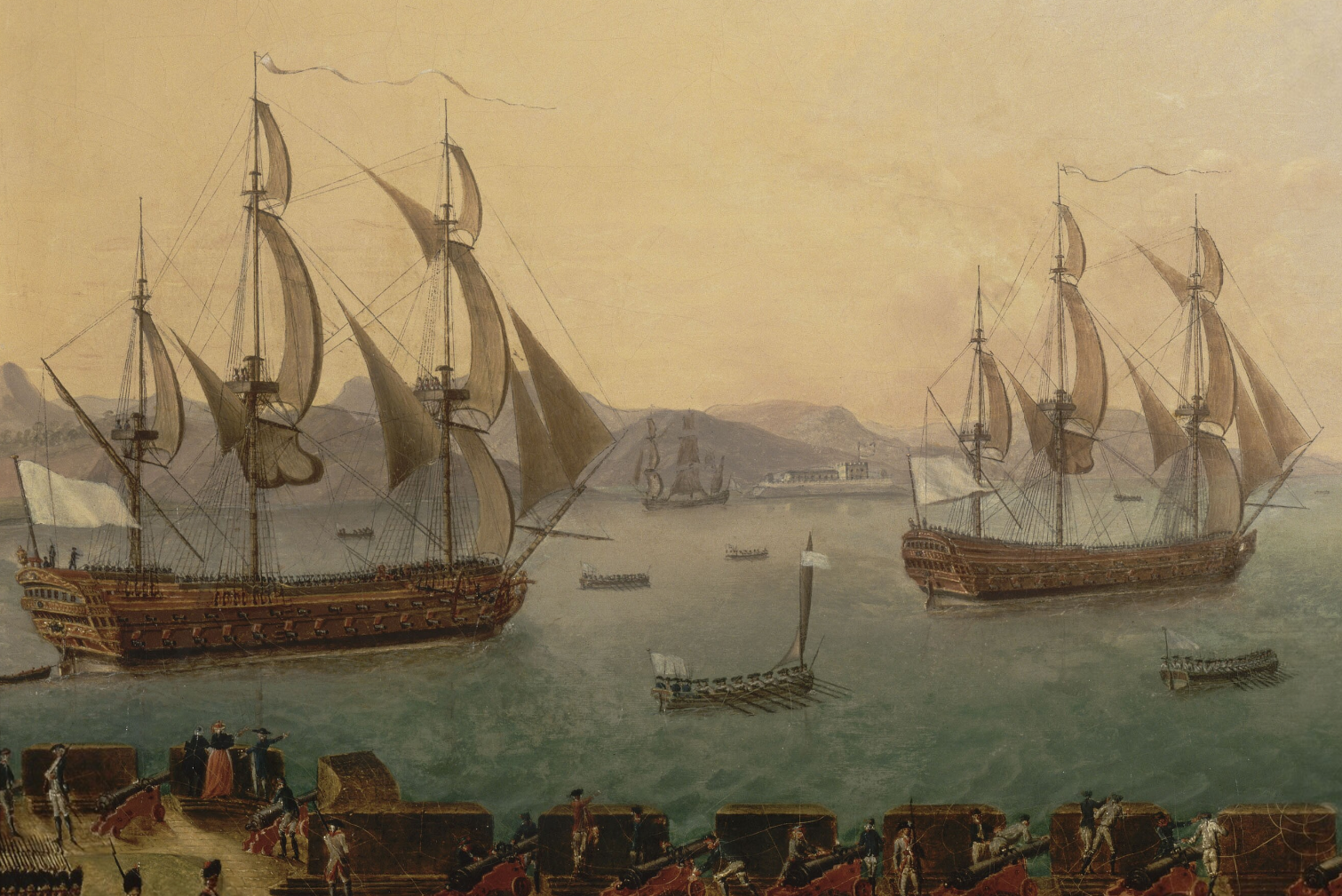
Vengeur and Réfléchi setting sail to reinforce Annibal

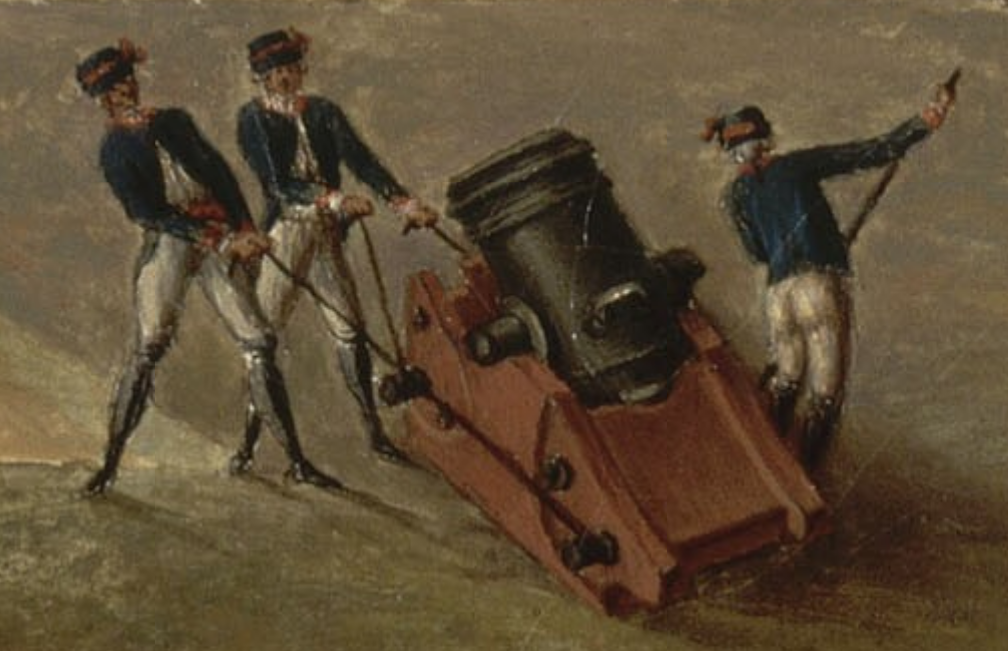
Heavy mortar of the French coastal defences

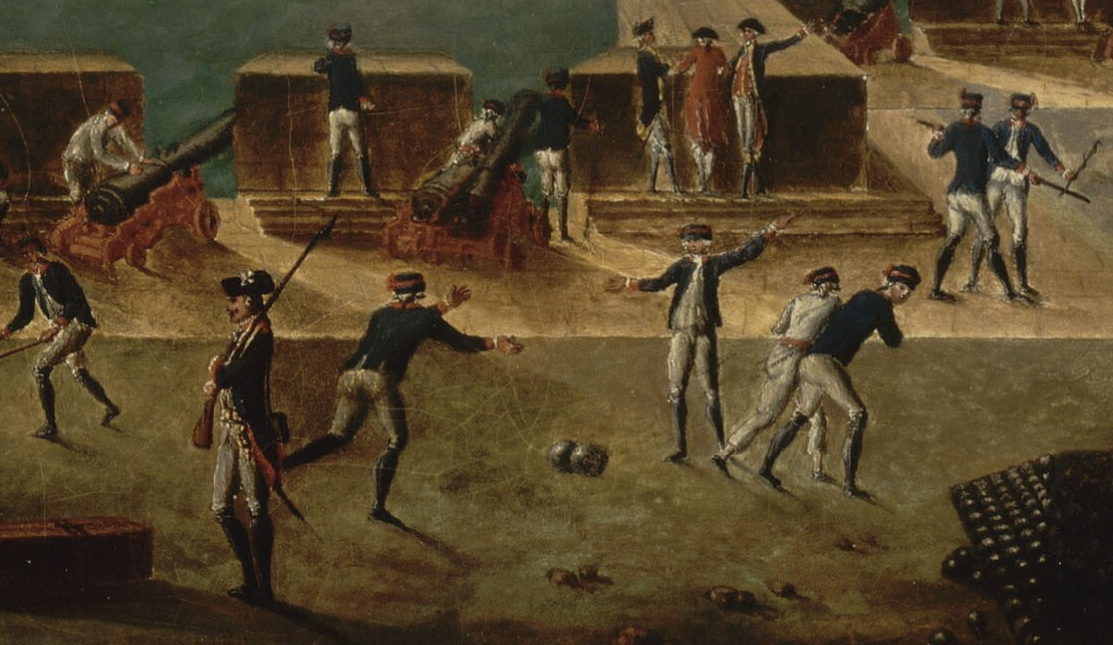
Long guns of the French coastal defences

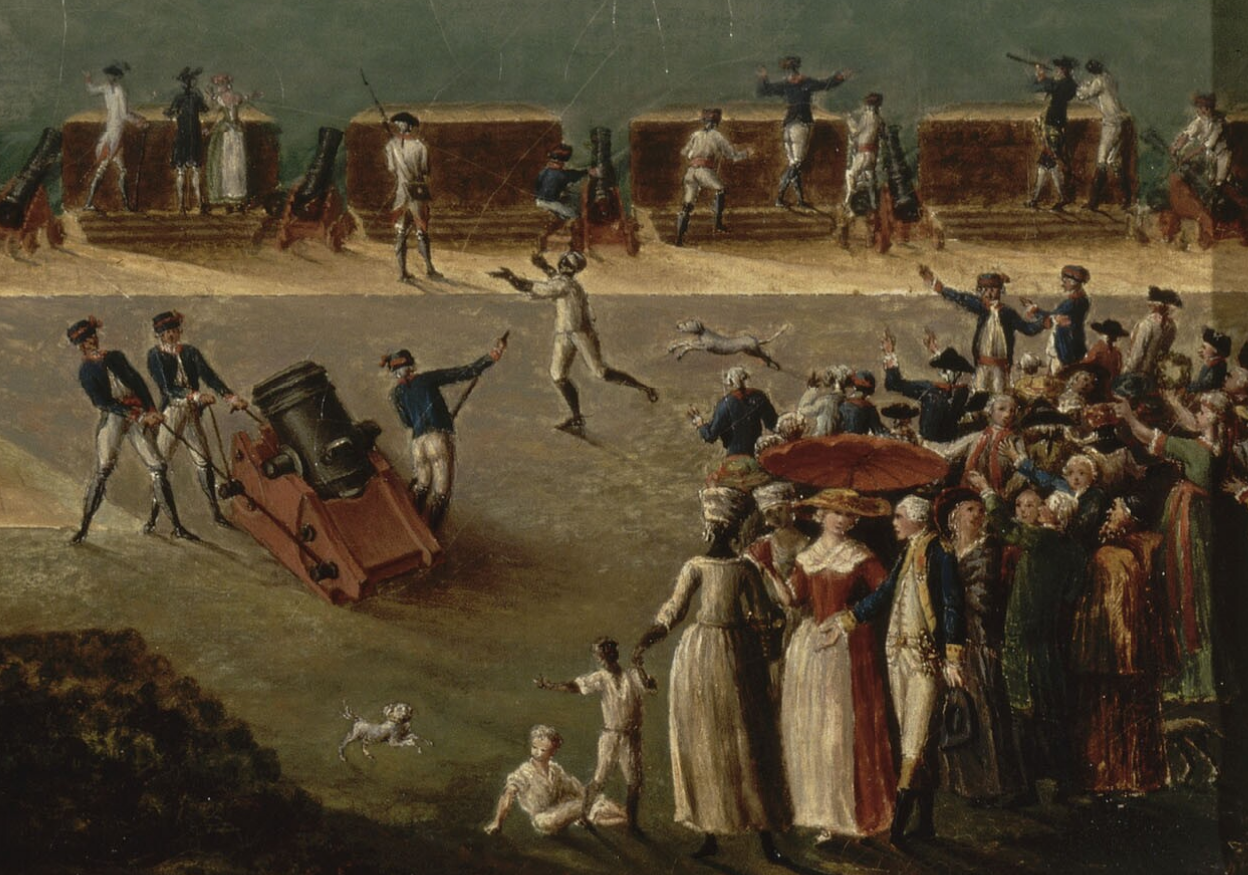
Civilians witnesses watching the battle
