= French ship Royal Louis (1780) =

Ship of the line of the French Navy

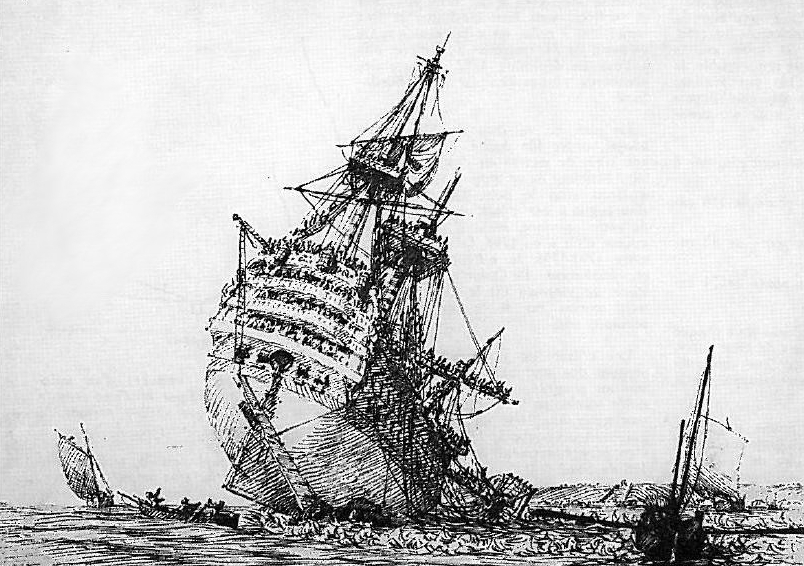
- Républicain grounded during the Croisière du Grand Hiver

History

France
- Name: Royal Louis
- Namesake: Louis of France
- Builder: Brest Dockyard
- Laid down: 8 March 1779
- Launched: 20 March 1780
- Completed: June 1780
- Commissioned: June 1780
- Renamed: Républicain (29 September 1792)
- Fate: Wrecked, 24 December 1794

General characteristics
- Class & type: 106-gun ship of the line
- Displacement: 4835tonneaux
- Tons burthen: 2400 port tonneaux
- Length: 60.4 metres
- Beam: 16.2 metres
- Draught: 8.6 metres
- Depth of hold: 24½ French feet
- Complement: 1,150
- Armament: 106 guns; 30 × 48-pounders on the lower deck (Note: The 48-pounders were replaced by 36-pounders on 1782.); 32 × 24-pounders on the middle deck; 32 × 12-pounders on the upper deck; 12 × 8-pounders on the quarterdeck and forecastle; 4 more 8-pounders were added in 1784 (Note: 4 more 8-pounders were added here in 1786, but these were replaced by 4 × 36-pounder obusiers in 1794)

Royal Louis was a 110-gun ship of the line of the French Navy. She was designed and built at Brest Dockyard by Léon-Michel Guignace.

== Career ==
In 1780, Royal Louis was under Louis-André Beaussier de Chateauvert. She took part in the Battle of Cape Spartel on 20 October 1782 under Antoine Hilarion de Beausset, with Jean-René de Verdun de La Crenne as flag captain, although she did not engage.

She was renamed Républicain in September 1792. Under this name, she took part in the Glorious First of June, being the last ship of the French rear. She was attacked, totally dismasted, and struck her colours; however, the British failed to take possession of the ship, which returned to Rochefort.

On 24 December 1794, she took part in the Croisière du Grand Hiver. As the fleet exited Brest harbour, she ran aground with the loss of 10 men. Her crew abandoned ship, and the wreck was destroyed in a tempest a few days later.

Representations of Républicain (ex-Royal-Louis)
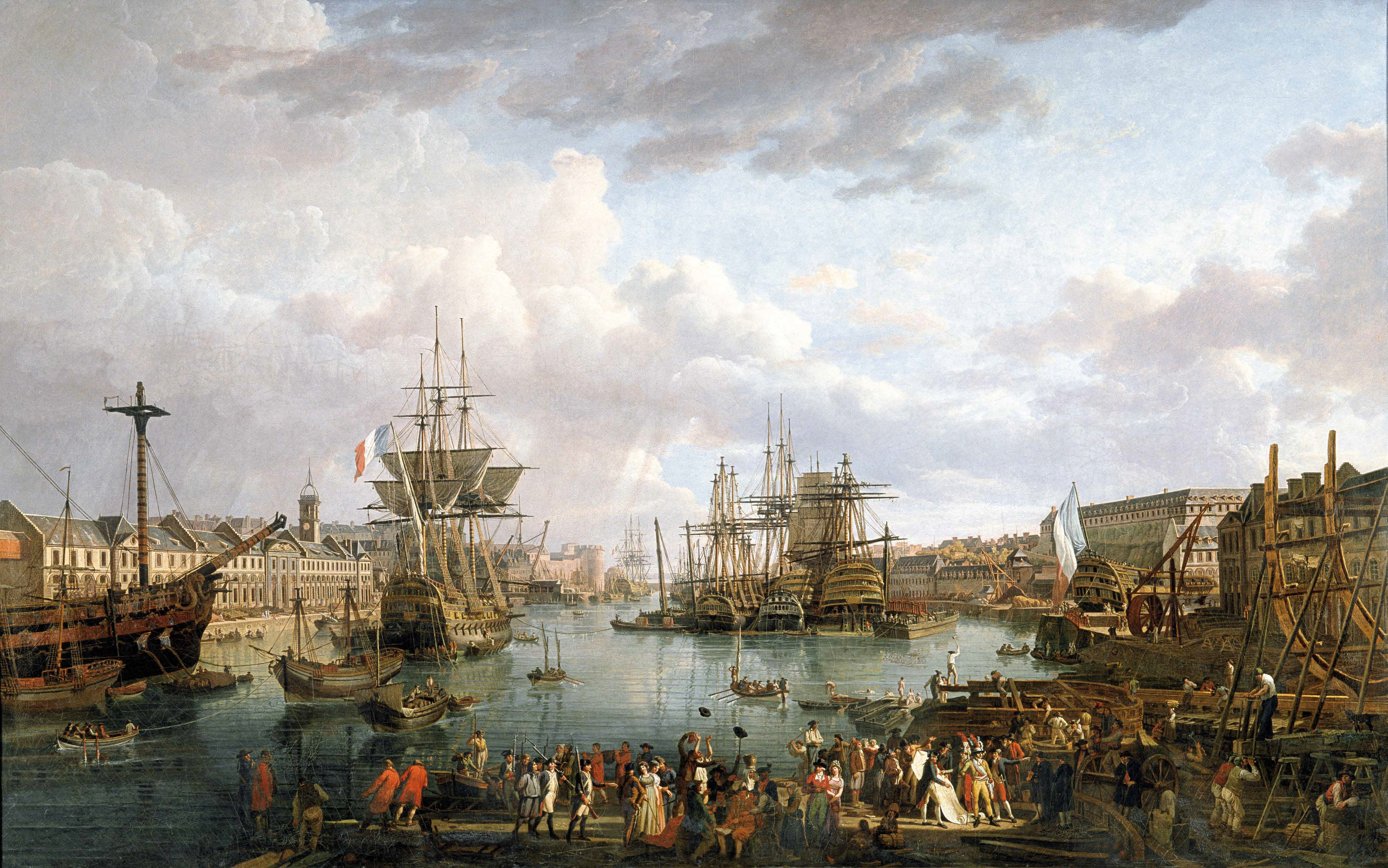
View of the Port of Brest by Jean-François Hue

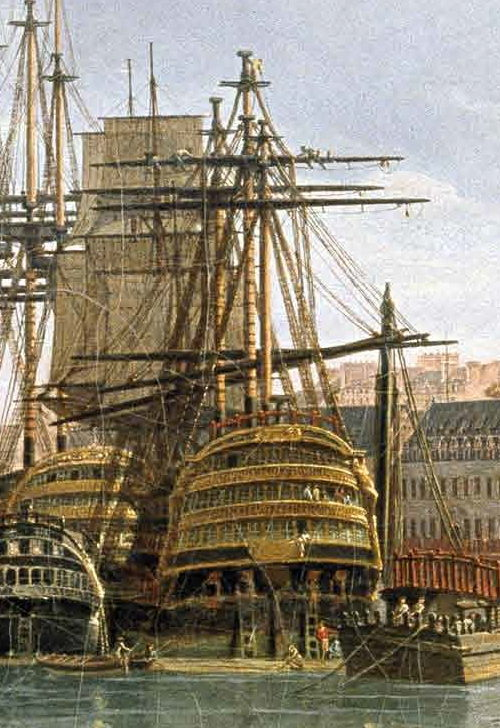
Républicain, details of Vue du port de Brest by Jean-François Hue

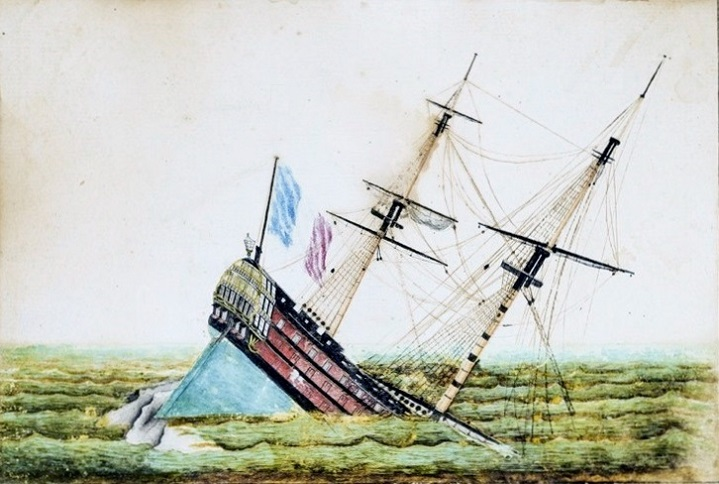
Naive drawing of Républicain sinking
