= French frigate Aurore (1768) =

History

France
- Name: Aurore
- Namesake: Aurora
- Ordered: 31 March 1766
- Builder: Rochefort
- Laid down: September 1766
- Launched: 23 November 1768
- In service: 1769
- Captured: Surrendered to the British by Royalist traitors in August 1793

Great Britain
- Name: HMS Aurora
- Acquired: August 1793
- Fate: Broken up 1803

General characteristics
- Displacement: 1100 tonneaux
- Tons burthen: 600 port tonneaux
- Length: 44.2 metres
- Beam: 11.2 metres
- Draught: 5.7 metres
- Sail plan: Full-rigged ship
- Armament: 28 × 12-pounder long guns; 6 × 6-pounder long guns

Aurore was a frigate of the French Navy.

== Career ==
Aurore was ordered on 31 March 1766 as Envieuse, and renamed to Aurore in February 1767, while still under construction.

Aurore took part in the 1772 edition of the Escadre d'évolution under Captain de La Tullaye.

On 16 July 1778, she departed Toulon under Captain Bompar for a mission in the Mediterranean, as part of a squadron under Louis de Fabry de Fabrègues.

On 20 January 1779, Aurore recaptured the storeship Heureux Jérôme, that the British had taken as prize, and brought her to Toulon.

In October 1779, Aurore departed Marseille under Joseph de Flotte, escorting a 26-ship convoy bound for Martinique, ferrying supplies for the French colonies of the Caribbeans and for the division under Chef d'Escadre Lamotte-Picquet. Arriving in Saint Lucia channel, the body of water between the islands of Saint Lucia and Martinique, the convoy met a 13-ship British squadron under Admiral Hyde Parker. The British gave chase, and Lamotte scrambled to cover the escape of the convoy, leading to the Battle of Martinique.

In 1780, she sailed from the Caribbean to Cadiz to take part in the Great Siege of Gibraltar.

In 1793, she was surrendered to the British by Royalist insurgents that had seized control of the city and harbour of Toulon.

The British removed her when they evacuated Toulon and the ship was renamed Aurora. She was hulked as a prison ship in 1799 at Gibraltar and was broken up there in 1803.
