= French ship Superbe (1784) =

Ship of the line of the French Navy

- Scale model of Achille, sister ship of French ship Superbe (1784), on display at the Musée national de la Marine in Paris.

History

France
- Name: Superbe
- Namesake: "Superb"
- Builder: Brest
- Laid down: July 1782
- Launched: 11 November 1784
- In service: 1785
- Out of service: 1795
- Fate: Sunk on 30 January 1795

General characteristics
- Class & type: Téméraire-class ship of the line
- Displacement: 3,069 tonneaux
- Tons burthen: 1,537 port tonneaux
- Length: 55.87 m (183 ft 4 in)
- Beam: 14.46 m (47 ft 5 in)
- Draught: 7.15 m (23.5 ft)
- Depth of hold: 7.15 m (23 ft 5 in)
- Sail plan: Full-rigged ship
- Crew: 705
- Armament: 74 guns: Lower gun deck: 28 × 36-pounder long guns; Upper gun deck: 30 × 18-pounder long guns; Forecastle and Quarterdeck: 12 × 8-pounder long guns, 10 × 36-pounder carronades

Superbe was a 74-gun Téméraire-class ship of the line built for the French Navy during the 1780s. Completed in 1785, she played a minor role in the Napoleonic Wars. The ship sank due to a leak near Brest in 1795 during the Croisière du Grand Hiver.

== Description ==
The Téméraire-class ships had a length of 55.87 metres (183 ft 4 in), a beam of 14.46 metres (47 ft 5 in) and a depth of hold of 7.15 metres (23 ft 5 in). The ships displaced 3,069 tonneaux and had a mean draught of 7.15 metres (23 ft 5 in). They had a tonnage of 1,537 port tonneaux. Their crew numbered 705 officers and ratings during wartime. They were fitted with three masts and ship rigged.

The muzzle-loading, smoothbore armament of the Téméraire class consisted of twenty-eight 36-pounder long guns on the lower gun deck, thirty 18-pounder long guns and thirty 18-pounder long guns on the upper gun deck. On the quarterdeck and forecastle were a total of a dozen 8-pounder long guns and 10 36-pounder carronades.

== Construction and career ==
Superbe was ordered in 1782 and was laid down at the Arsenal de Brest in July. The ship was named on 1 June and launched on 17 December. She was completed in July 1783. In 1787, Superbe was the flagship of the Escadre d'évolution under Nieuil. She departed Brest in June for the training cruise and reached Lisbon, Portugal, before returning in August. The ship was reactivated in March 1793 and her crew mutinied in September. Superbe took part in the Croisière du Grand Hiver, where she sank due to a leak on 30 January 1795.
