= Philip of Poitiers =

Philip of Poitiers or Philip of Poitou may refer to:

- Philip of Poitou (d. 1208), bishop of Durham from 1197
- Philip of Antioch (d. 1225), member of the House of Poitiers, king of Armenian Cilicia from 1222 to 1224
- Philip V of France (d. 1322), count of Poitou from 1311 to 1316 and then king of France and Navarre
