= Saint-Pierre-d'Argençon =

- Commune
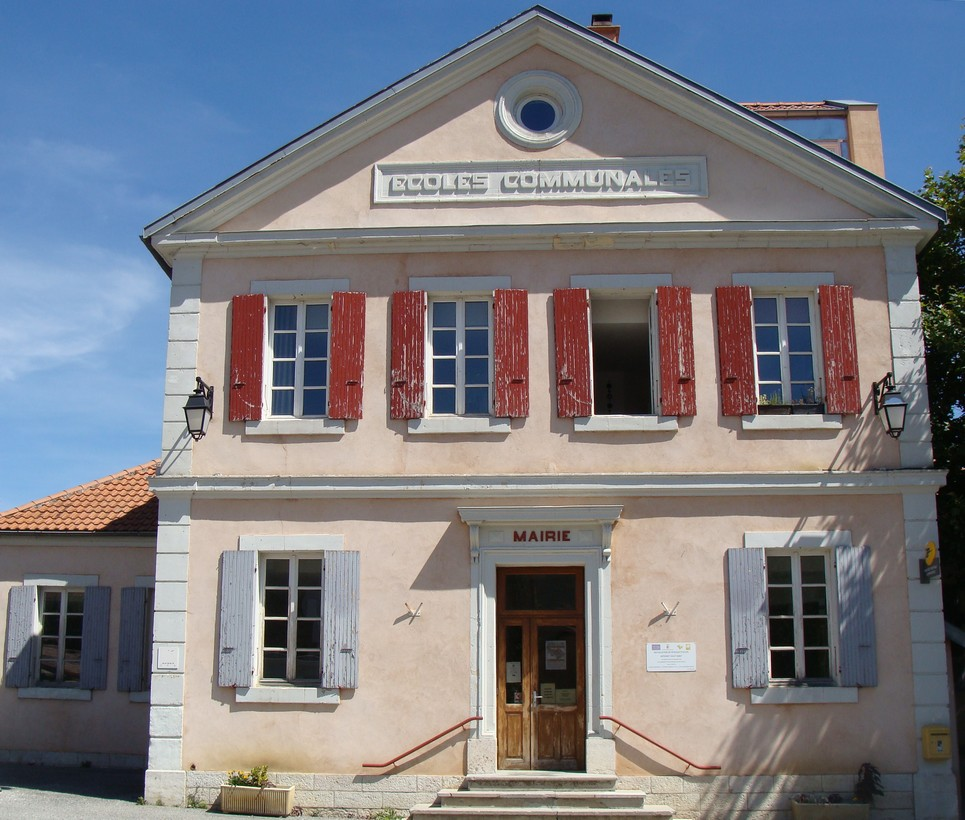
- The town hall of Saint-Pierre-d'Argençon
- Location of Saint-Pierre-d'Argençon
- Location within France Location within Provence-Alpes-Côte d'Azur
- Coordinates: 44°31′15″N 5°41′56″E
- Country: France
- Region: Provence-Alpes-Côte d'Azur
- Department: Hautes-Alpes
- Arrondissement: Gap
- Canton: Serres

Government
  - Mayor (2026–32): Jérôme Boutry
- Area^{1}: 18.81 km^{2} (7.26 sq mi)
- Elevation: 778 m (2,552 ft)
- Highest elevation: 1,560 m (5,120 ft)
- Lowest elevation: 737 m (2,418 ft)
- Population (2023): 150
  - Density: 8.0/km^{2} (21/sq mi)
- Time zone: UTC+01:00 (CET)
  - Summer (DST): UTC+02:00 (CEST)
- INSEE/Postal code: 05154 /05140
- ^{1} French Land Register data, which excludes lakes, ponds, glaciers > 1 km^{2} (0.386 sq mi or 247 acres) and river estuaries.

Saint-Pierre-d'Argençon (French pronunciation: [sɛ̃ pjɛʁ daʁʒɑ̃sɔ̃]; Vivaro-Alpine: Sant Peire d'Argençon) is a commune in the Hautes-Alpes department in the Provence-Alpes-Côte d'Azur region in Southeastern France. It is located on the departmental border with Drôme, which is also the regional border with Auvergne-Rhône-Alpes.

== Demographics ==
Historical population
Year	Pop.	±% p.a.
1968	151	—
1975	136	−1.48%
1982	147	+1.12%
1990	141	−0.52%
1999	150	+0.69%
2007	165	+1.20%
2012	158	−0.86%
2017	156	−0.25%
2023	150	−0.65%
Source: INSEE

== See also ==
- Communes of the Hautes-Alpes department
