= French ship Robuste (1758) =

Ship of the line of the French Navy

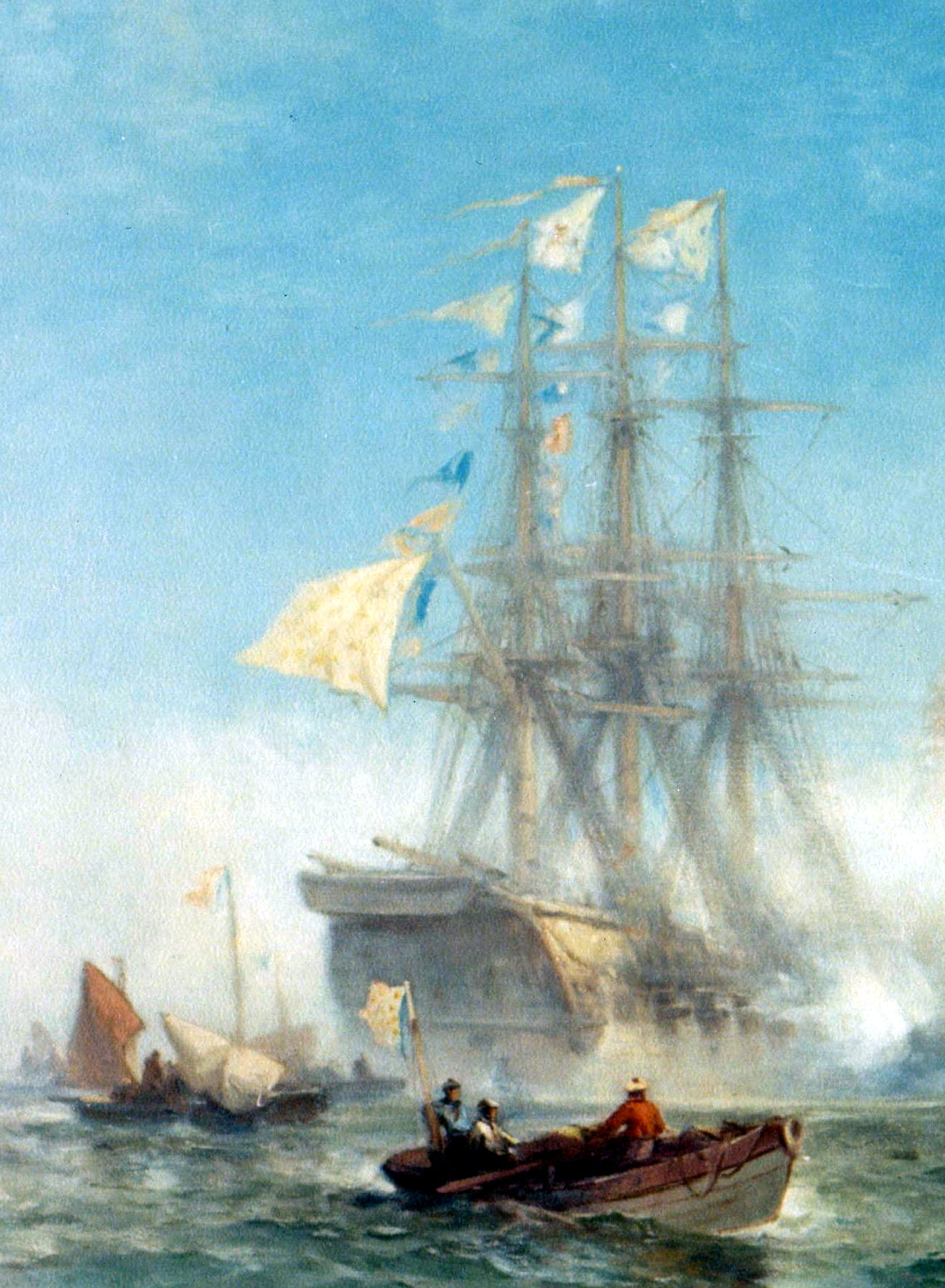
- Detail of Edward Moran's First Recognition of the American Flag by a Foreign Government

History

France
- Name: Robuste
- Namesake: "Robust"
- Ordered: 10 September 1755
- Builder: Lorient
- Laid down: September 1757
- Launched: 2 September 1758
- Fate: Retired in 1783

General characteristics
- Class & type: 74-gun ship of the line
- Type: ship of the line
- Displacement: 3000 tonneaux
- Tons burthen: 1600 port tonneaux
- Length: 56.8 metres
- Beam: 14.4 metres
- Depth of hold: 7 metres
- Propulsion: Sail
- Complement: 866
- Armament: 80 guns; 28 × 36-pounders; 30 × 18-pounders; 16 × 8-pounders

Robuste was an 74-gun ship of the line of the French Navy, built by Antoine Groignard.

== Career ==
Initially intended as a 64-gun ship, Robuste was built in the Lorient shipyard of the French East India Company. She was launched on 2 September 1758, and admitted to active service in April 1759.

On 18 November 1759, she collided with frigate Hébé.

In June 1777, she was under Lamotte-Picquet, and received the visit of Emperor Joseph II.

On 14 February 1778, Robuste fired a nine-gun salute for USS Ranger, marking the first time a foreign warship recognised the US flag.

Robuste took part in the campaign in 1779 and 1780 as De Grasse's flagship. She was notably at the Battle of Grenada.

In 1780, she was under Chateauvert.

In July 1782, under Nieuil, she was part of the Franco-Spanish fleet under Córdova. She took part in the Battle of Cape Spartel on 20 October 1782. The same year, she was at Brest under Croiset de Retz.

She was eventually struck in 1783, and broken up in Brest the next year.
