= Poitiers Campus, Sciences Po =

Poitiers Campus
- Campus de Poitiers, Sciences Po College Universitaire
- University: Paris Institute of Political Studies (Sciences Po)
- Type: Public Higher Education
- Established: 2001
- President: Luis Vassy
- Vice-president: Pascale Leclercq
- Academic staff: 100
- Students: 200
- Address: Collège Aliénor, Poitiers, France
- Language: English, French, Portuguese, Spanish
- Regional Focus: Latin America, Spain and Portugal
- Website: www.sciencespo.fr/college/en/campus/poitiers.html

The Poitiers Campus (French: Campus de Poitiers) is one of the constituent campuses of the Paris Institute of Political Studies, commonly referred to as Sciences Po. It is home to the Europe-Latin America Programme, offering students the opportunity to study the countries of the Iberian Peninsula and South America. Founded in 2001, it inaugurated its new home in a medieval former convent, renamed Collège Aliénor, in January 2019.

== History ==
The campus was created in 2001, as one of the first decentralised campuses, along with Nancy and Dijon, of the Paris Institute of Political Studies.

The campus moved to the renovated seventeenth-century Hôtel Chaboureau, property of the University of Poitiers, in 2004. Initially, the Hôtel Chaboureau welcomed around 120 students. However, following considerable growth, Sciences Po acquired a new site located on rue Jean-Jaurès, which was inaugurated in January 2019. This will allow the campus to increase its capacity to around 250 students. The site, a medieval Jacobite convent, dating back to the thirteenth century, was renamed Collège Aliénor as a tribute to Eleanor of Aquitaine. It has a long history as a centre of learning, having been chosen as the seat of the University of Poitiers by Pope Eugene IV in the fifteenth century, and more recently having served as one of the campuses of the École supérieure de commerce et management, who vacated the site in 2018.

== Academics ==
The Poitiers Campus prepares students for the prestigious Bachelor of Arts (BA) in the Social Sciences and Humanities, a multidisciplinary programme common to all students of the Sciences Po Undergraduate College, regardless of their campus. The curriculum provides students with academic and methodological foundations in economics, history, humanities, law, political science, and sociology. Students continue with advanced study of the disciplines through a multidisciplinary perspective while diving into coursework related to their multidisciplinary major of choice: Economy & Society, Political Humanities, or Politics & Government.

The particularity of the Poitiers Campus is the specialisation on South America, Spain and Portugal. The programme offers the opportunity to focus on the political, geopolitical and economic issues of Latin America, in a comparative perspective with the European Union, particularly the Iberian Peninsula. Students explore Latin America's history and contemporary questions such as democratic issues, how economies are integrating into the globalised economy, urban development, and regional and continental integration. The programme is taught mainly in French, with some courses in English, Spanish and optionally in Portuguese.

Sciences Po has integrated a civic learning programme as part of the undergraduate studies. This helps students make the direct link between civic issues covered in class and their personal engagement to giving back to society through participation in activities hosted by the university or initiatives in the public, private, or non-profit sectors.

During their third year, students are required to complete their studies abroad in a partner university. The Poitiers Campus also offers a dual degree programme with University College London, as well as partnership programmes with the Pontifical Catholic University of São Paulo, Torcuato di Tella University, and the Pontifical Catholic University of Chile.

The Campus also organises an annual winter school for its students, either in Spain or in Portugal.

== Student life ==
Accommodating around 200 students, almost 60% of whom are international students of over 30 nationalities (mainly from Latin America and Spain), the campus benefits from a large cultural diversity. The Campus is situated in the historic university town of Poitiers, home to one of the oldest universities in Europe (founded in 1431), and with a student population that makes up a quarter of the total number of inhabitants. Many sporting and cultural events enrich student life both within the university and in the town itself.

== See also ==
- Sciences Po
- Instituts d'études politiques
