= Louis of Poitiers =

Louis of Poitiers may refer to:

- Louis of Poitiers (bishop of Metz), who succeeded Henri, Dauphin of Viennois
- Louis I de Poitiers, Count of Valentinois, a French army commander, who died of wounds suffered in the Battle of Auberoche in 1345
- Louis of Poitiers (bishop of Valence), bishop of Valence from 1448 to 1468
