= Canton of Poitiers =

Canton of Poitiers may refer to:

- Canton of Poitiers-1, Arrondissement of Poitiers, Department of Vienne, Region of Nouvelle-Aquitaine, France
- Canton of Poitiers-2, Arrondissement of Poitiers, Department of Vienne, Region of Nouvelle-Aquitaine, France
- Canton of Poitiers-3, Arrondissement of Poitiers, Department of Vienne, Region of Nouvelle-Aquitaine, France
- Canton of Poitiers-4, Arrondissement of Poitiers, Department of Vienne, Region of Nouvelle-Aquitaine, France
- Canton of Poitiers-5, Arrondissement of Poitiers, Department of Vienne, Region of Nouvelle-Aquitaine, France
- Canton of Poitiers-6, Arrondissement of Poitiers, Department of Vienne, Region of Nouvelle-Aquitaine, France
- Canton of Poitiers-7, Arrondissement of Poitiers, Department of Vienne, Region of Nouvelle-Aquitaine, France
