= Jean-Georges du Croiset de Retz =

French Navy officer of the War of American Independence

Gaspard de Ligondès was a French Navy officer. He served in the American Revolutionary War.

== Biography ==
Retz was born to a family from Auvergne. He joined the French Navy as a Garde-Marine in 1741. He was promoted to lieutenant in 1756, to commander in 1767, and to captain in 1772.

In 1779, Retz captained the 64-gun Vengeur, part of the division under De Grasse sent to D'Estaing as reinforcement. Retz was wounded at the Battle of Grenada on 6 July 1779, and took part in the Siege of Savannah in September and October 1779. He also fought in the Battle of Martinique on 17 April 1780, where Vengeur, along with Destin and Saint Michel, directly engaged the much stronger British vessels HMS Sandwich, under Rodney, HMS Cornwall and HMS Suffolk.

In 1781, Retz captained the 74-gun Zodiaque at Brest. In 1782, he transferred to Robuste. The same year, he was promoted to brigadier. Retz retired from the Navy with the rank of Chef d'Escadre in 1786.

== Sources and references ==
=== Bibliography ===
- Contenson, Ludovic (1934). La Société des Cincinnati de France et la guerre d'Amérique (1778-1783). Paris: éditions Auguste Picard. OCLC 7842336.
- Lacour-Gayet, Georges (1905). La marine militaire de la France sous le règne de Louis XVI. Paris: Honoré Champion. OCLC 763372623.
- Troude, Onésime-Joachim (1867). Batailles navales de la France (in French). Vol. 2. Challamel ainé.
