= Louis-Joseph Beaussier de l' Isle =

French naval officer (1701–1765)

Louis-Joseph Lisle
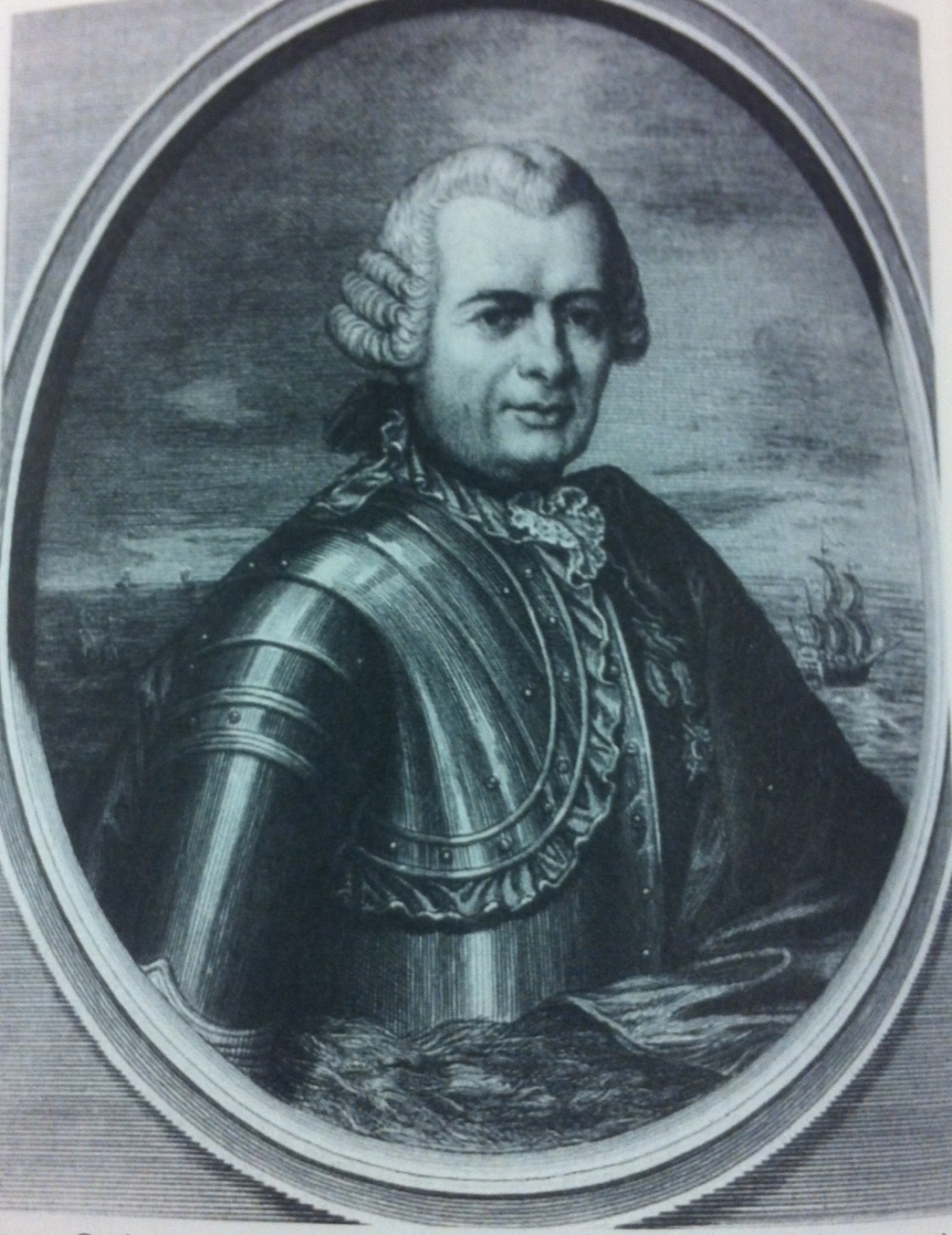
- Born: 15 March 1701; Toulon, France
- Died: 4 June 1765 (aged 64)
- Military career
- Allegiance: France
- Service years: 1755-1758
- Conflicts: Seven Years' War 2nd Siege of Louisbourg (POW)

Louis-Joseph Beaussier de Lisle (15 March 1701 – June 4, 1765) was a career naval officer from one of the oldest families of Toulon, France.

Beaussier had a long and varied naval career and by 1750 had made captain. He also was made a knight of the Order of Saint Louis. In 1755, as captain of Héros, he brought assistance to Canada and Louisbourg during the 7 Years War. In 1756, he brought six ships to Quebec carrying Montcalm and 1,300 troops as reinforcements. Returning to France, he engaged two British ships at Fort Louisbourg and badly damaged them. In 1758, he commanded a ship in a squadron that sailed to Louisbourg to assist governor Drucour in its defence. After the 2nd Siege of Louisbourg, the fortress fell to the British on July 27, 1758 and Beaussier was taken prisoner with the rest of the garrison.
