= View of the Port of Brest =

Painting by Jean-François Hue

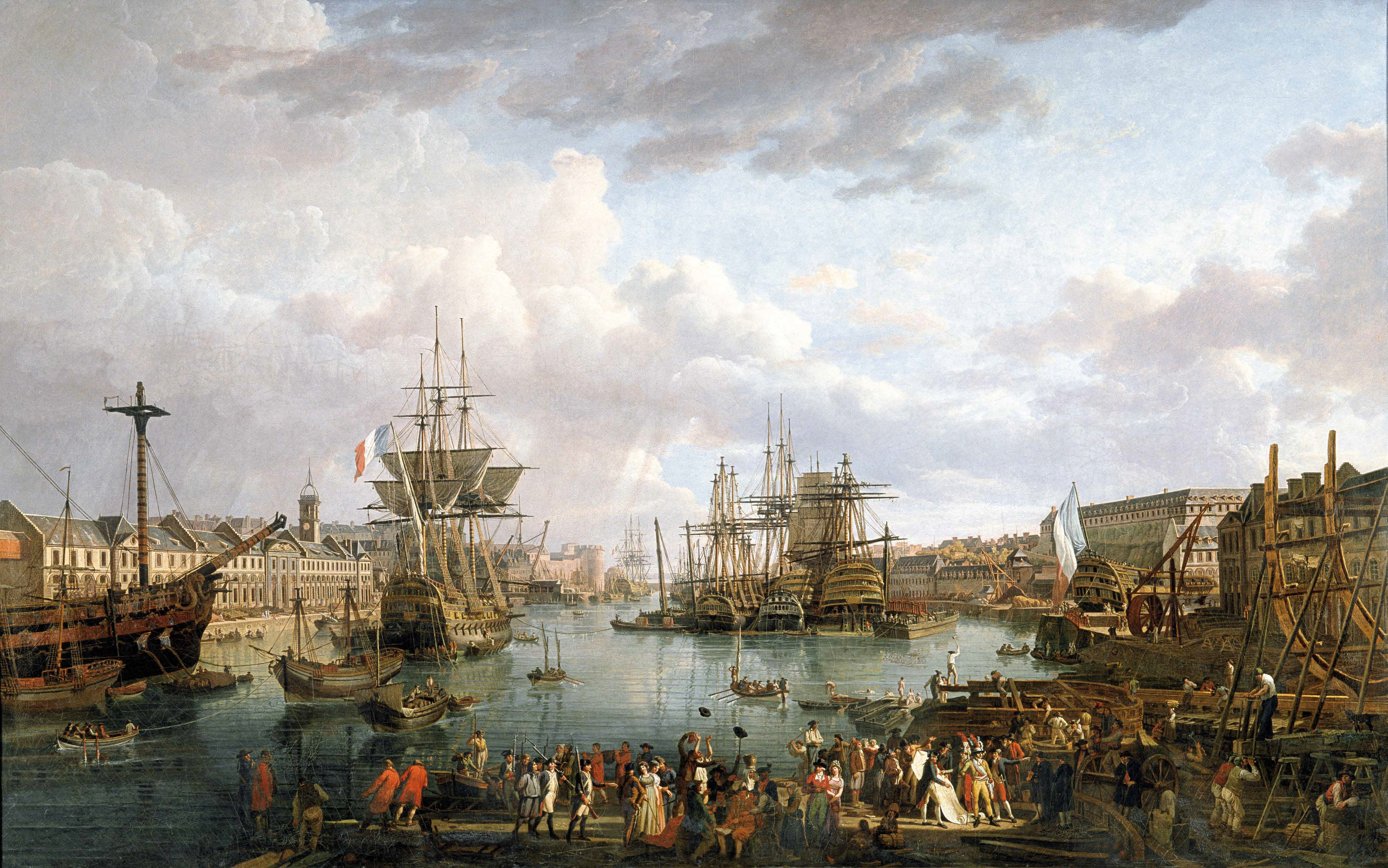
- Artist: Jean-François Hue
- Year: 1794
- Type: Oil on canvas, landscape painting
- Dimensions: 162 cm × 260.5 cm (64 in × 102.6 in)
- Location: Musée national de la Marine, Paris
- Accession: 7 OA 2 D (Musée national de la Marine), INV 5396 (Louvre)

View of the Port of Brest (French: Vue de l'intérieur du Port de Brest) is a 1794 landscape painting by the French artist Jean-François Hue. It depicts the harbour of Brest in Brittany. Hue had been a protégé of the marine painter Joseph Vernet. Following the French Revolution, he was commissioned by the authorities to create a new series of paintings to complement Vernet's Views of the Ports of France which he had produced decades earlier during the reign of Louis XV. He painted views of several of the key ports of Brittany.

It portrays a view from the east bank of the River Penfeld near the Pontaniou dry dock. The ships of the line Bretagne and Républicain are identifiable in the crowded harbour. The tricolour flags were likely not in the original picture, but were added before it was displayed at the Salon of 1795. The painting is now in the collection of the Louvre but is on permanent display at the Musée national de la Marine in Paris.

== Bibliography ==
- Casid, Jill H. Sowing Empire: Landscape and Colonization. University of Minnesota Press, 2005.
- Croix, Alain & Lespagnol, André. Les Bretons et la mer: images et histoire. Apogée, 2005.
