= William of Poitiers (disambiguation) =

William of Poitiers (1020–1090) was a Norman priest and chronicler, chaplain to William the Conqueror.

William of Poitiers may also refer to:

- William III of Aquitaine (915–963), called Towhead, count of Poitiers from 935
- William IV of Aquitaine (937–994), called Fierebras, count of Poitiers from 963 to 990
- William V of Aquitaine (969–1030), called the Great, count of Poitiers from 990
- William VI of Aquitaine (1004–1038), called the Fat, count of Poitiers from 1034
- William VII of Aquitaine (1023–1058), called the Eagle, count of Poitiers from 1039
- William VIII of Aquitaine (1025–1086), count of Poitiers from 1058
- William IX of Aquitaine (1071–1126), called the Troubadour, count of Poitiers from 1086
- William X of Aquitaine (1099–1137), called the Saint, count of Poitiers from 1126
- William FitzEmpress (1136–1164), youngest son of Empress Matilda

== See also ==
- William (disambiguation)
- Poitiers
- Poitou
