= Poitier =

Poitier is a surname. Notable people with the name include:

- Damion Poitier (born 1976), American actor
- Jane Poitier (1736–1786), British singer and dancer
- Sidney Poitier (1927–2022), Bahamian-American actor, film director, and author
- Sydney Tamiia Poitier (born 1973), American actress, daughter of Sidney

== See also ==
- Poitiers (disambiguation)
