= Jean-François Hue =

French painter

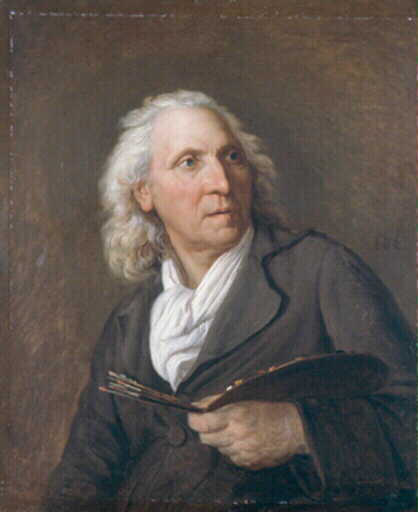
- Born: 2 December 1751; Saint-Arnoult-en-Yvelines
- Died: 24 December 1823 (aged 72) former 5th arrondissement of Paris
- Occupation: Painter

Signature
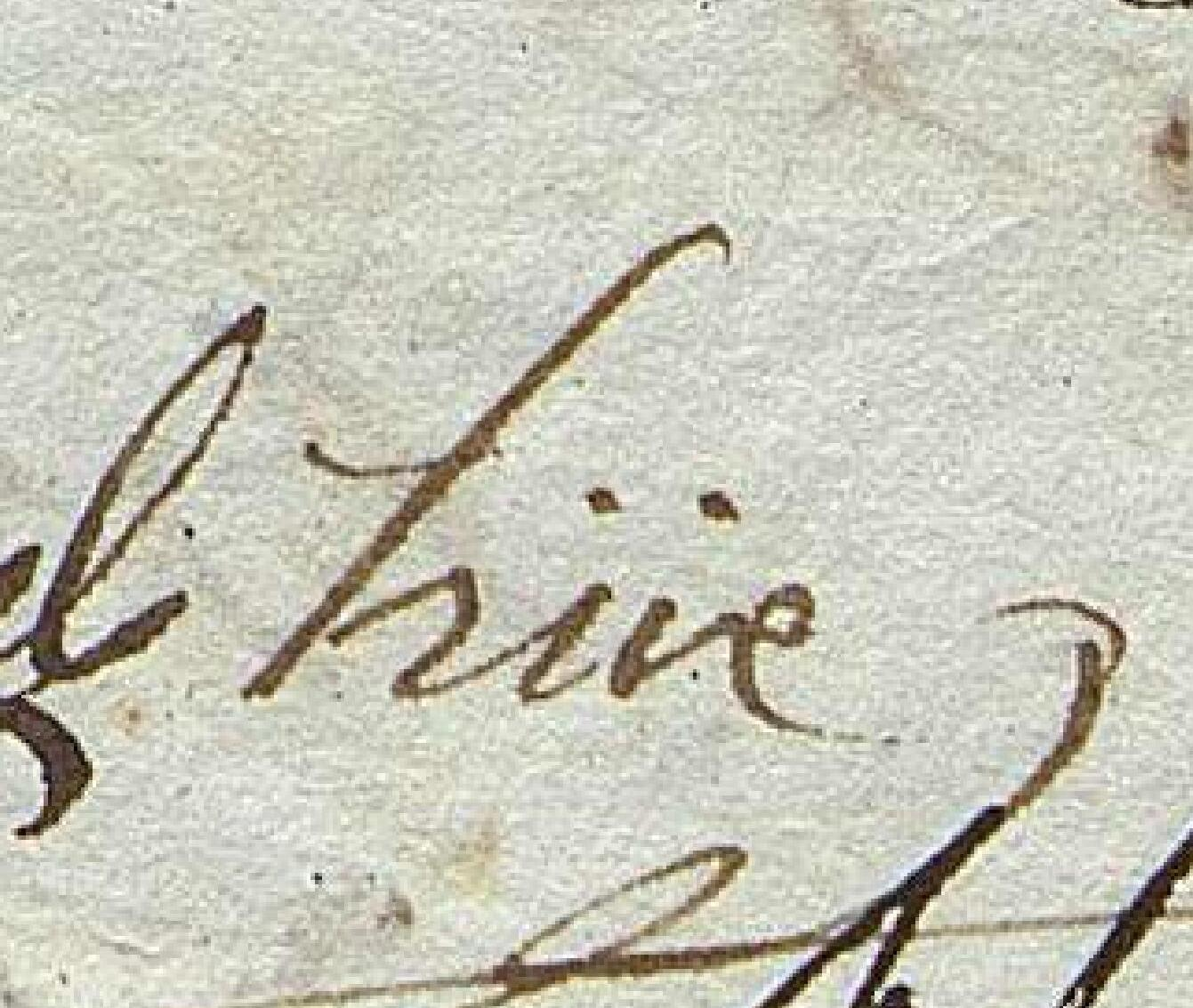

Jean-François Hue (2 December 1751 – 26 December 1823) was a French painter, known for marine and landscape paintings.

== Biography ==
Jean-François Hue was born in Saint-Arnoult-en-Yvelines. He entered the Académie Royale in 1782, on the strength of his painting Vue prise dans la forêt de Fontainebleau.

Hue was noticed by Joseph Vernet and became the pupil of Gabriel-François Doyen in Paris. He then joined Vernet's workshop, where he painted Quatre vues du château de Mousseaux et de ses jardins (undated, 74.8 × 85.8 cm).

In 1791, the Assemblée Constituante requested he finish the series Views of the Ports of France that Vernet had started in 1753 and left unfinished in 1765. Between 1792 and 1798, Hue created six paintings depicting the harbours of Brittany. His 1794 painting View of the Port of Brest was exhibited at the Salon of 1795 at the Louvre.

He died in Paris in 1823.

== Gallery ==
Paintings of battles
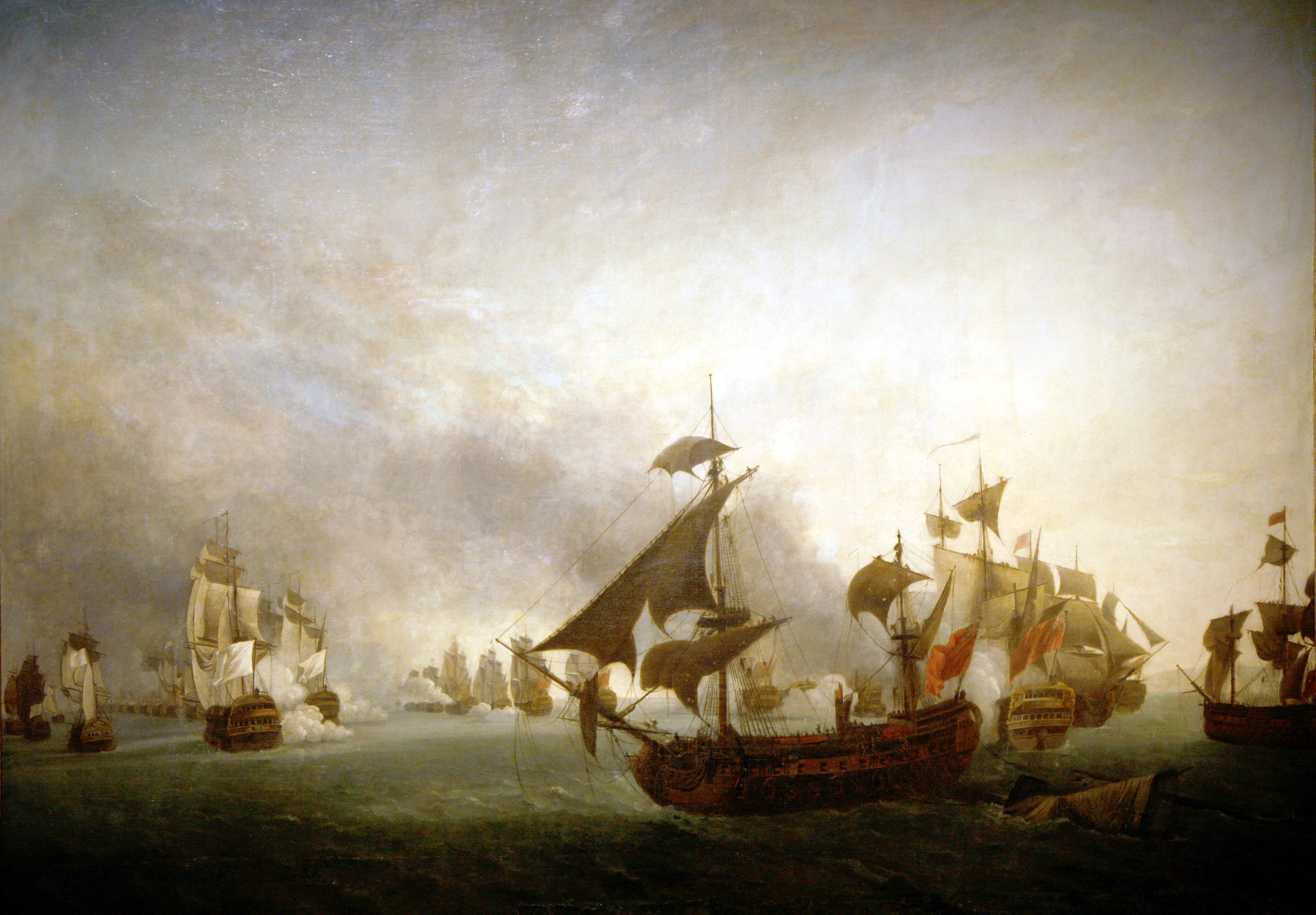
Naval battle off the island of Grenada, 6 July 1779 (1789), Musée national de la Marine

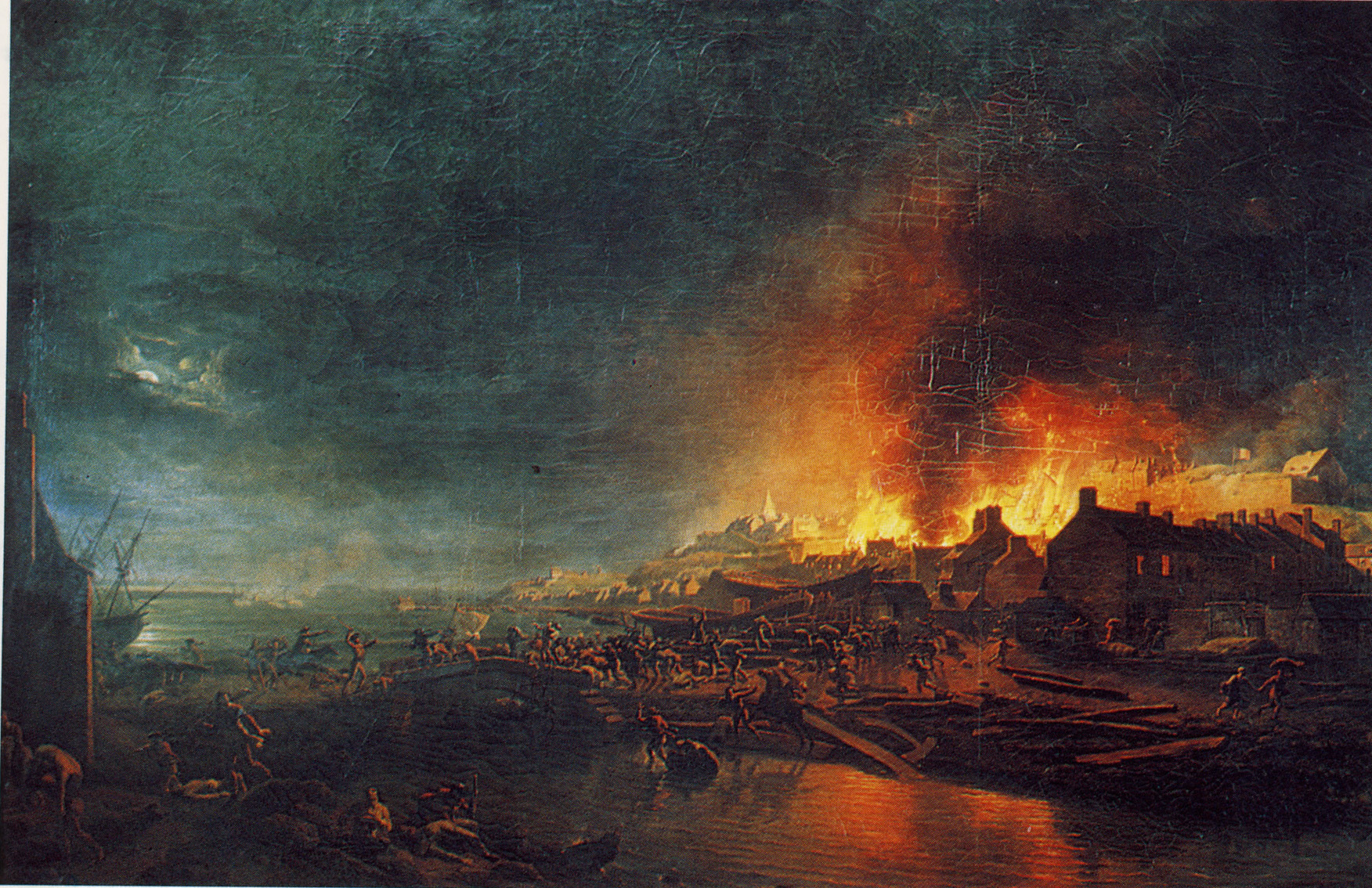
The Chouans setting fire to Granville (1800), Historial de la Vendée

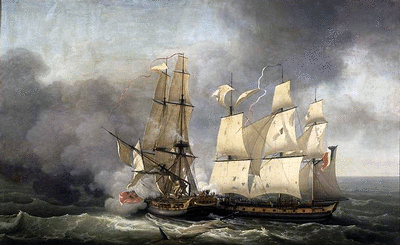
Hue's depiction of the action of 14 December 1798
Series on the harbours of France
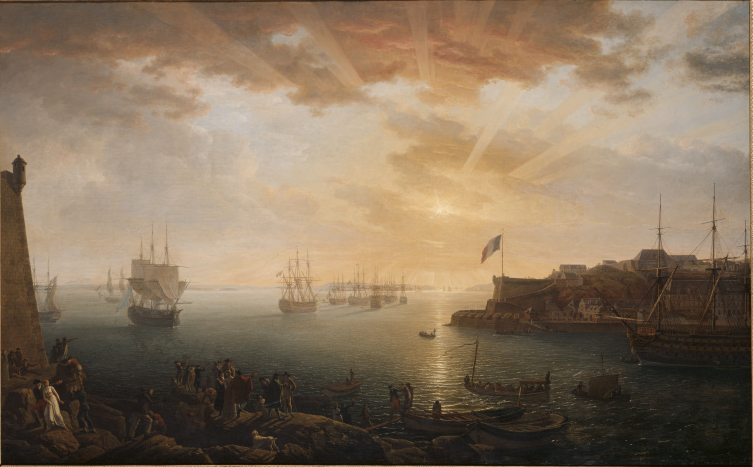
View of the harbour of Brest, taken from the bottom of the castle battery, Luxembourg Palace

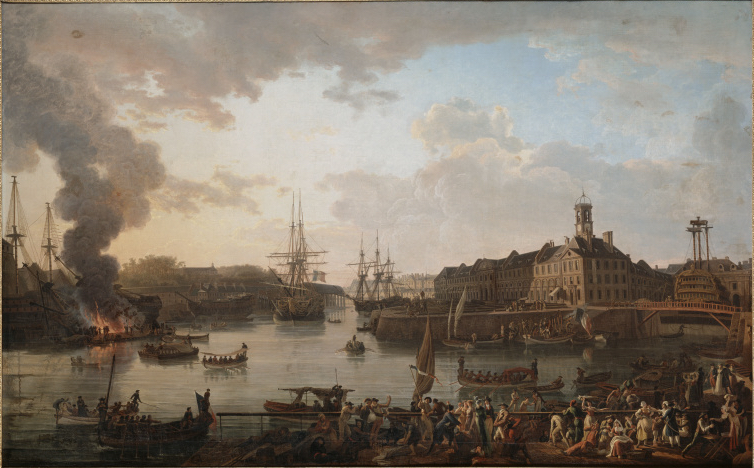
View of the interior of the port of Brest taken from the open slipway, Luxembourg Palace

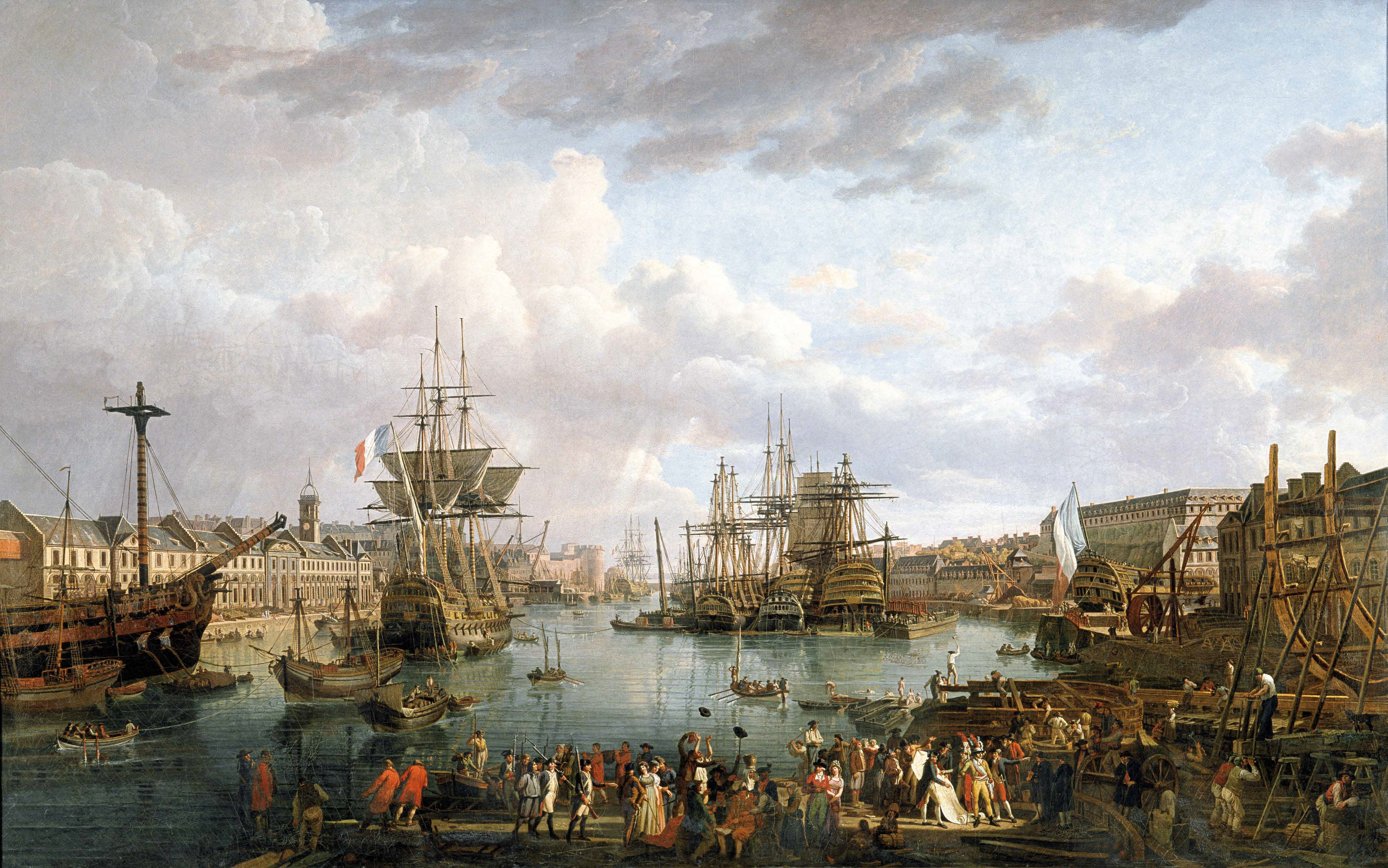
View of the Port of Brest (1794)

== Notes and references ==
Notes

Bibliography

- Pierre-Auguste Miger, Les Ports de France peints par Joseph Vernet et Jean-François Hue, Paris, Lenormand, 1812, 126 p.
- Catalogue des tableaux composant le cabinet de feu M. Hüe, available at Gallica
- Bibliothèque du Musée des Beaux-Arts, Tours.
