= Louis Guillaume de Parscau du Plessix =

French Navy officer of the War of American Independence

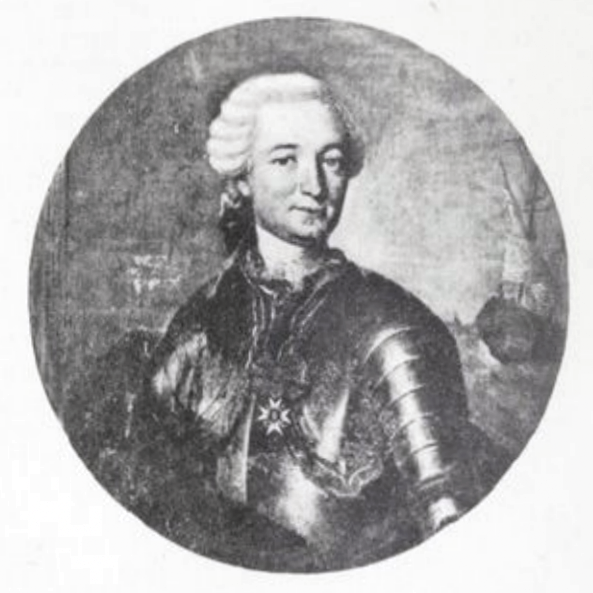
- Born: 1725 Saint-Malo, France
- Died: 1786 (aged 60–61)
- Branch: French Navy
- Rank: Seven Years' War
- Conflicts: Seven Years' War; War of American Independence

Louis Guillaume de Parscau du Plessix (Saint-Malo, 1725 — 1786) was a French Navy officer. He served in the War of American Independence, earning membership in the Society of the Cincinnati.

== Biography ==
Parscau was born to the family of a navy Ensign. He joined the Navy as a Garde-Marine in 1743.

During the Seven Years' War, Parscau served on the 64-gun Brillant under Conflans. Parscau was promoted to Lieutenant in 1756.

In 1762, Parscau had a son, Hervé Louis Joseph Marie de Parscau du Plessix. (Note: He would himself be a Navy officer, raising to contre-amiral in 1827.)

Parscau was promoted to Captain in 1772. In 1777, he commanded the 64-gun Roland in Brest. Navy Minister Sartine had chosen her to be one of the six ships held ready for immediate departure at all times. (Note: The six ships held in a state of maximum readiness in Brest were the 74-gun Robuste, under Lamotte-Picquet; Actif, under Hector; Fendant, under Vaudreuil; and the 64-gun Bizarre, under Montecler; Roland, under Du Plessis Parscau; and Triton, under Brach.)

In 1779, he was flag captain to Orvilliers on the 110-gun Bretagne.

In 1780, he was given command of the 74-gun Intrépide in the squadron under Guichen. He took part in the Battle of Martinique on 17 April 1780, and in an expedition against British interests in Florida. He took part in the Siege of Pensacola in May 1781. On 22 July 1781, as the squadron was anchored at Cap français, a barrel of local rum caught fire, and Intrépide exploded. De Grasse wrote that Parscau was not to be blamed for the incident, and requested he be given a new command.

Parscau was then given command of the 80-gun Languedoc. He took part in the Battle of the Chesapeake on 5 September 1781, as flag captain to Monteil, commander of the French rear.

After the battle, Parscau ferried Lauzun back to France and brought the news of the outcome of the battle.

Parscau was promoted to Brigadier in 1782, and commanded the 74-gun Guerrier in the fleet under Córdova.

Parscau was promoted to Chef d'Escadre in 1784.

== Sources and references ==
Notes

Citations

References

- Contenson, Ludovic (1934). La Société des Cincinnati de France et la guerre d'Amérique (1778-1783). Paris: éditions Auguste Picard. OCLC 7842336.
- Lacour-Gayet, Georges (1910). La marine militaire de la France sous le règne de Louis XVI. Paris: Honoré Champion. pp. 431–434.
- Troude, Onésime-Joachim (1867). Batailles navales de la France (in French). Vol. 2. Challamel ainé.
