= French ship Triton (1747) =

Ship of the line of the French Navy

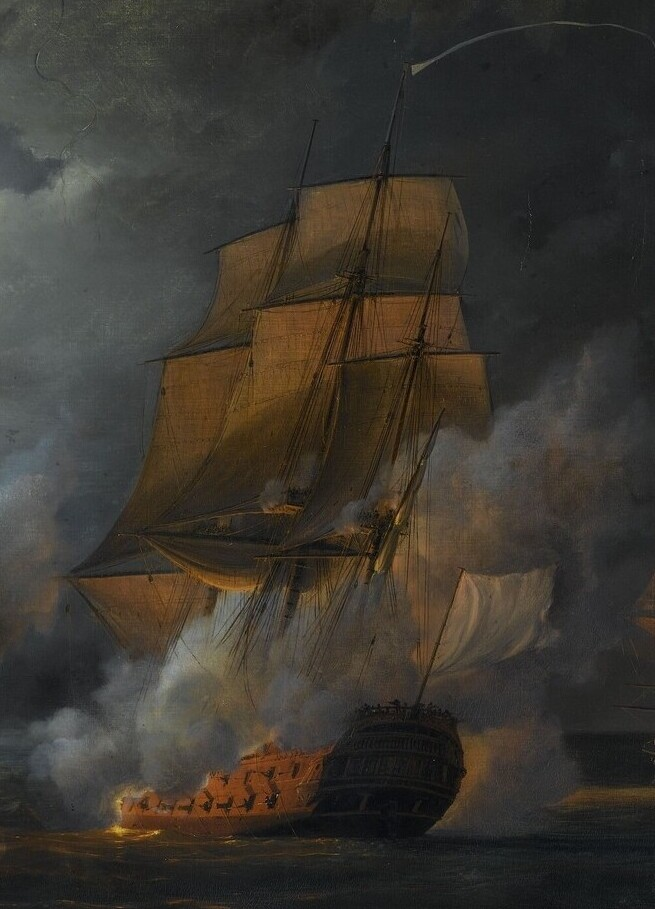
- Triton at the action of 20 October 1778

History

France
- Name: Triton
- Ordered: 9 November 1745
- Builder: Toulon
- Laid down: January 1747
- Launched: 4 August 1747
- In service: December 1747
- Out of service: 1794
- Fate: Broken up 1794

General characteristics
- Displacement: 2150 tonneaux
- Tons burthen: 1242 port tonneaux
- Length: 48.6 metres
- Beam: 13.2 metres
- Draught: 6.8 metres
- Propulsion: Sails
- Sail plan: Full-rigged ship
- Complement: 9 to 12 officiers; 480 to 560 men
- Armament: 26 × 24-pounder long guns; 28 × 12-pounder long guns; 10 × 6-pounder long guns
- Notes: 6-month autonomy.

Triton was a 64-gun ship of the line of the French Navy designed by François Coulomb the Younger. She took part in the Seven Years' War and in the War of American Independence.

== Career ==
On 30 July 1757, Triton rescued the crew of the 30-gun frigate Rose, and her captain, Sade de Vaudronne, had her beached and scuttled by fire to prevent her falling into British hands after a battle with the 32-gun HMS Thames.

In June 1758, under Captain du Lac de Montvert, Triton captured the frigate HMS Deal Castle.Triton took part in the Battle of Lagos on 18–19 August 1759.

In 1777, she was under Brach. Navy Minister Sartine chose her to be one of the six ships held ready for immediate departure at all times. (Note: The six ships held in a state of maximum readiness in Brest were the 74-gun Robuste, under Lamotte-Picquet; Actif, under Hector; Fendant, under Vaudreuil; and the 64-gun Bizarre, under Montecler; Roland, under Du Plessis Parscau; and Triton, under Brach.)

In 1778, Triton was part of the squadron under Orvilliers, being the last ship in the First Division of the Blue Squadron (Rear). Her commanding officer was Captain Ligondès. In the action of 20 October 1778, Triton managed to disable HMS Medea and fight off the 50-gun Jupiter.

In 1779, she was part of the light squadron in Orvilliers' fleet, under La Clocheterie

In 1780, she was part on Guichen's squadron, under Captain Brun de Boades. She took part in the Battle of Martinique on 17 April 1780. On 21 August 1780, Captain Deydier de Pierrefeu took command, until 2 June 1782.

In 1781, she was attached to a squadron under Monteil, and took part in the Siege of Pensacola from 21 April.

On 24 November 1782, Triton was at Saint-Pierre, Martinique, part of a squadron that comprised Solitaire, Résolue, Nymphe, and the brig Speedy.

On 10 February 1783, Triton captured the 12-gun HMS Tickler off Cuba.

== Fate ==
After the war, Triton was put in the ordinary at Toulon. From 1783 to 1785, she was on loan to the Compagnie de Chine as a merchantman. She was eventually broken up in Cherbourg in 1794.
