= Louis de Rigaud de Vaudreuil =

French Navy officer of the War of American Independence

Louis de Rigaud de Vaudreuil (Revel, 17 October 1728 – 1810) was a French Navy officer. He served in the War of American Independence.

== Biography ==
Rigaud de Vaudreuil was born a younger son of Louis-Philippe de Rigaud de Vaudreuil (1691–1763), and brother to Louis-Philippe de Rigaud (1724–1802). He joined the Navy as a Garde-Marine in 1743. He was promoted to Ensign in 1746, to Lieutenant in 1756, and to Captain in 1777.

In 1747, he served on the brand-new 74-gun Intrépide, along with his elder brother.

In 1772, he was first officer on the 50-gun Fier.

In 1777, he was commanding the 74-gun Fendant, in Brest. Navy Minister Sartine had chosen her to be one of the six ships held ready for immediate departure at all times. (Note: The six ships held in a state of maximum readiness in Brest were the 74-gun Robuste, under Lamotte-Picquet; Actif, under Hector; Fendant, under Vaudreuil; and the 64-gun Bizarre, under Montecler; Roland, under Du Plessis Parscau; and Triton, under Brach.)

Between March 1780 and 28 February 1781, he commanded Magnanime, on a cruise between Belle-Ile, Rochefort, La Rochelle and Brest,

In 1781, Vaudreuil was captain of the brand-new 74-gun Sceptre, in the White Squadron of the fleet under De Grasse. He captained her at the Battle of the Chesapeake on 5 September 1781, and at the Battle of the Saintes.

On 12 January 1782, Vaudreuil was promoted to Chef d'Escadre, and put in charge of the squadron of Rochefort. He was promoted to contre-amiral on 1 January 1792, and to Vice-amiral on 1 July 1792.

== Sources and references ==
Notes

Citations

References

- Chenaye Desbois, François Alexandre Aubert (1786). Dictionnaire de la noblesse ... de France. Paris. p. 424.
- Contenson, Ludovic (1934). La Société des Cincinnati de France et la guerre d'Amérique (1778–1783). Paris: éditions Auguste Picard. OCLC 7842336.
- Gardiner, Asa Bird (1905). The order of the Cincinnati in France. The Rhode Island state society of Cincinnati. OCLC 5104049.
- Lacour-Gayet, Georges (1910). La marine militaire de la France sous le règne de Louis XVI. Paris: Honoré Champion.
- Morris, Robert (1988). The Papers of Robert Morris, 1781–1784. p. 479. ISBN 9780822970262.
- Troude, Onésime-Joachim (1867). Batailles navales de la France (in French). Vol. 2. Challamel ainé.
- Roche, Jean-Michel (2005). Dictionnaire des bâtiments de la flotte de guerre française de Colbert à nos jours. Vol. 1. Group Retozel-Maury Millau. ISBN 978-2-9525917-0-6. OCLC 165892922.

External links

- Archives nationales (2011). "Fonds Marine, sous-série B/4: Campagnes, 1571-1785" (PDF).
