= Louis Augustin de Monteclerc =

French Navy officer of the War of American Independence

Louis Augustin de Monteclerc (La Rongère, Maine, 1727 – 25 March 1784) was a French Navy officer. He served in the War of American Independence.

== Biography ==
Monteclerc joined the Navy as a Garde-Marine in 1743.

Monteclerc was promoted to Lieutenant in 1757. He served on Éveillé, in Conflans' squadron, during the Seven Years' War.

Monteclerc was promoted to Captain in 1772. In 1777, he commanded the 64-gun Bizarre. Navy Minister Sartine had chosen her to be one of the six ships held ready for immediate departure at all times. (Note: The six ships held in a state of maximum readiness in Brest were the 74-gun Robuste, under Lamotte-Picquet; Actif, under Hector; Fendant, under Vaudreuil; and the 64-gun Bizarre, under Montecler; Roland, under Du Plessis Parscau; and Triton, under Brach.)

In 1779, he commanded a division comprising the 64-gun Solitaire and the frigates Inconstante and Surveillante, and led an expedition to hunt down privateers. The division returned to Brest on 4 May 1779 with 400 prisoners. Later that year, Solitaire was attached to a squadron under Orvilliers.

In late 1779, Monteclerc was appointed vice-Director of naval constructions in Brest, and he was promoted to Director on 1 January 1780. That same year, he commanded the 74-gun Hector, departing on 1 September and returning on 31 December.

Monteclerc was promoted to Brigadier in 1781. Later that year, he was given command of the 74-gun Diadème in the squadron under De Grasse. He was wounded in the Battle of the Chesapeake on 5 September 1781, and took part in the Battle of the Saintes on 12 April 1782.

Monteclerc was acquitted from all accusations in the inquiry that followed the battle. He then served under Vaudreuil before retiring in 1783.
