= List of shipwrecks in 1779 =

The list of shipwrecks in 1779 includes some ships sunk, wrecked or otherwise lost during 1779.

table of contents
1779
Jan	Feb	Mar	Apr
May	Jun	Jul	Aug
Sep	Oct	Nov	Dec
Unknown date

== January ==
=== 20 January ===
List of shipwrecks: 20 January 1779
Ship	State	Description
Curwen	Ireland	The ship was sighted whilst on a voyage from New York, United States to Cork. Presumed to have subsequently foundered with the loss of all hands.

=== 25 January ===
List of shipwrecks: 25 January 1779
Ship	State	Description
Fortune	Great Britain	The privateer struck rocks at St Mawes Castle, Cornwall and was wrecked. Her crew survived.
Lydia	Great Britain	The ship was driven ashore and wrecked at Sheepland, County Down, Ireland. She was on a voyage from Liverpool, Lancashire to Cork, Ireland.

=== Unknown date ===
List of shipwrecks: Unknown date in January 1779
Ship	State	Description
Bersham	Great Britain	The ship was captured and subsequently lost. She was on a voyage from Saint Petersburg, Russia to Whitehaven, Cumberland.
Duc de Chatelet	Kingdom of France	The ship exploded in the Loire with the loss of all hands. She was on a voyage from Nantes to Saint-Domingue.
Henry	Great Britain	The ship was driven ashore in Dungarvan Bay. She was on a voyage from Bristol, Gloucestershire to Cork, Ireland and Madeira.
L'Esperance en Dieu	Kingdom of France	The ship was captured by the privateer Surprize ( (Kingdom of Great Britain) Guernsey). She was subsequently lost near Waterford, Ireland. L'Esperance en Dieu was on a voyage from Bordeaux to Martinique.
Mary	Great Britain	The ship was lost near Saint-Valery-sur-Somme, France. Her crew were rescued.
Nancy	Ireland	The ship was driven ashore and wrecked in the Orkney Islands. She was on a voyage from Memel, Prussia to Newry, County Antrim.

== February ==
=== 12 February ===
List of shipwrecks: 12 February 1779
Ship	State	Description
Adventure	Great Britain	The privateer foundered in the English Channel. Her crew were rescued by a Dutch vessel.

=== 28 February ===
List of shipwrecks: 28 February 1779
Ship	State	Description
Roland	French Navy	The Artésien-class ship of the line was destroyed by fire at Brest.
Zéphyr	French Navy	The frigate was destroyed by fire at Brest.

=== Unknown date ===
List of shipwrecks: Unknown date in February 1779
Ship	State	Description
Ancona Paquet	Great Britain	The ship foundered in the Mediterranean Sea off Cape Cane, near Tunis. She was on a voyage from Smyrna, Ottoman Empire to London.
Jesse	Great Britain	The ship was lost on the coast of Ireland. She was on a voyage from Glasgow, Renfrewshire to Cork, Ireland and Antigua.
Polly	Great Britain	The ship was driven ashore and wrecked in Carnarvon Bay. Her crew were rescued. She was on a voyage from New York, United States to Liverpool, Lancashire.

== March ==
=== 8 March ===
List of shipwrecks: 8 March 1779
Ship	State	Description
Vsevolod (Всеволод)	Imperial Russian Navy	The Slava Rossii-class ship of the line was destroyed by fire at Reval.

=== 12 March ===
List of shipwrecks: 12 March 1779
Ship	State	Description
Defense	(United States) Connecticut State Navy	The warship, a brig, ran aground on the Bartlett Reef, off Waterford, Connecticut and was wrecked whilst evading Royal Navy vessels.

=== 14 March ===
List of shipwrecks: 14 March 1779
Ship	State	Description
Francis	Great Britain	The transport ship was driven ashore in Chele Bay, Isle of Wight. She was on a voyage from Cork, Ireland to London.

=== 16 March ===
List of shipwrecks: 16 March 1779
Ship	State	Description
Hawke	Great Britain	The ship was destroyed by fire in the River Thames. She was on a voyage from London to Gothenburg, Sweden.

=== 19 March ===
List of shipwrecks: 19 March 1779
Ship	State	Description
HMS Arethusa	(Kingdom of Great Britain) Royal Navy	American Revolutionary War: The fifth rate frigate was wrecked on the south coast of Ouessant, France (48°27′04″N 5°04′04″W) whilst engaged in a battle with Aigrette (French Navy). Her crew were rescued.

=== 22 March ===
List of shipwrecks: 22 March 1779
Ship	State	Description
"Molly"	United States	American Revolutionary War:The scow was captured by frigate HMS Delaware ( (Kingdom of Great Britain) Royal Navy) 25 Leagues north of Cape Charles. Crew escapes when she went ashore at Barnegat, New Jersey.

=== 23 March ===
List of shipwrecks: 23 March 1779
Ship	State	Description
Trety (Третий, 'The Third')	Imperial Russian Navy	The Trety-class frigate caught fire and exploded at Kertch with the loss of twenty of her crew.

=== 24 March ===
List of shipwrecks: 24 March 1779
Ship	State	Description
Success	Flag unknown	The sloop went ashore at Barnegat, New Jersey.

=== 25 March ===
List of shipwrecks: 25 March 1779
Ship	State	Description
Dispatch	Great Britain	The ship foundered in the English Channel off Beachy Head, Sussex. She was on a voyage from London to Dublin, Ireland.

=== 26 March ===
List of shipwrecks: 26 March 1779
Ship	State	Description
Perseverance	Great Britain	The whaler was wrecked on the Burbo Bank, in Liverpool Bay. She was on a voyage from Liverpool, Lancashire to Greenland.

=== Unknown date ===
List of shipwrecks: Unknown date in March 1779
Ship	State	Description
Edward & Lucy	Great Britain	The ship ran aground in the River Thames at Limehouse, Middlesex. She was on a voyage from London to America.
Fox	French Navy	The frigate ran aground off Pointe St. Jaques and was wrecked.
Renown	Great Britain	The ship was lost at the "Pile of Fowdry". She was on a voyage from Liverpool, Lancashire to Cork, Ireland and Jamaica.

== April ==
=== 7 April ===
List of shipwrecks: 7 April 1779
Ship	State	Description
Tartar	Great Britain	The privateer foundered in the Atlantic Ocean 6 leagues (18 nautical miles (33 km) off the Isles of Scilly. Her crew were rescued by a fishing vessel.

=== 8 April ===
List of shipwrecks: 8 April 1779
Ship	State	Description
Dawn	(Kingdom of Great Britain) Guernsey	The ship was wrecked on the Goodwin Sands, Kent with the loss of seven of her eleven crew.

=== 9 April ===
List of shipwrecks: 9 April 1779
Ship	State	Description
Nossa Senhora da Vida, St. António St. Thomas	Portugal	The ship was driven ashore and wrecked on Gotland, Sweden. She was on a voyage from Lisbon to Saint Petersburg, Russia.

=== 12 April ===
List of shipwrecks: 12 April 1779
Ship	State	Description
Snapper	Great Britain	The privateer was driven ashore and severely damaged at Cork, Ireland.

=== 18 April ===
List of shipwrecks: 18 April 1779
Ship	State	Description
Montague	Great Britain	The ship was driven ashore 14 nautical miles (26 km) from Waterford, Ireland. She was on a voyage from Bristol, Gloucestershire to Waterford.

=== 25 April ===
List of shipwrecks: 25 April 1779
Ship	State	Description
Mars	United States	American Revolutionary War: The ship was captured by the privateer Stag ( (Kingdom of Great Britain) Jersey. She was sent in to Jersey but was lost going into port.

=== 29 April ===
List of shipwrecks: 29 April 1779
Ship	State	Description
Delight	United Kingdom	American Revolutionary War:The brig went ashore at Pecks Beach, New Jersey near Cape May. Ship and crew captured by Militia.

=== Unknown date ===
List of shipwrecks: Unknown date in April 1779
Ship	State	Description
Darnell	(Kingdom of Great Britain) Guernsey	The ship was wrecked on the Goodwin Sands, Kent. She was on a voyage from Guernsey to London.
Fortune	Great Britain	The ship was wrecked on the Dutch coast. She was on a voyage from Marseille, France to Amsterdam, Dutch Republic.
Revenge	Great Britain	The ship, a letter of marque, was driven ashore in Stokes Bay.
St Magnus	Bremen	The ship was driven ashore 10 nautical miles (19 km) from Bremen. She was on a voyage from Bremen to London, Great Britain.

== May ==
=== 2 May ===
List of shipwrecks: 2 May 1779
Ship	State	Description
Charming Molly	Great Britain	The tender was destroyed by fire at Gosport, Hampshire.

=== 14 May ===
List of shipwrecks: 14 May 1779
Ship	State	Description
Sturdy Begger	Great Britain	The privateer was captured on the 14th. She was subsequently wrecked on Islay, Scotland. All on board died.

=== 21 May ===
List of shipwrecks: 21 May 1779
Ship	State	Description
Unnamed	Flag unknown	American Revolutionary War:The 16 gun brig went ashore near Egg Harbor, New Jersey.

=== Unknown date ===
List of shipwrecks: Unknown date in May 1779
Ship	State	Description
Concord	Great Britain	The ship was lost near Reval, Russia. She was on a voyage from London to Saint Petersburg, Russia.
Jane & Ann	Great Britain	The ship was lost on Anholt, Denmark. She was on a voyage from Marstrand, Sweden to Danzig.
Lord Cardiff	Great Britain	Anglo-French War (1778–83): The privateer was captured and burnt by Solitaire (French Navy).
Martha	Great Britain	The ship was driven ashore east of Plymouth, Devon. She was on a voyage from Portland, Dorset to Plymouth.
Old England	Great Britain	Anglo-French War (1778–83): The privateer was sunk by Surveillante (French Navy) with the loss of 30 of her crew.
Sally	Great Britain	The ship was lost near Reval. She was on a voyage from Hull, Yorkshire to Reval.
Señora Dama Luisa	flag unknown	The ship was driven ashore at Ostend, Dutch Republic. She was on a voyage from Livorno, Grand Duchy of Tuscany to Ostend.
Snapper	Great Britain	The privateer was wrecked on the coast of Ireland.
Unnamed	United States	American Revolutionary War:The ship went ashore at Egg Harbor, New Jersey while being pursued by privateer General Pattison (Great Britain).
William	Great Britain	The ship was lost on "Dunsness", near Riga, Russia. She was on a voyage from London to Riga.
Crescent	Great Britain	The frigate had been newly built in Bristol, and was caught in a storm while on its way to join the fleet at Spithead. 4 crewmen died and 10 were gravely wounded.

== June ==
=== 20 June ===
List of shipwrecks: 20 June 1779
Ship	State	Description
Konstantsiya (Констанция, 'Constance')	Imperial Russian Navy	The frigate capsized at Kronstadt. She was righted.

=== 26 June ===
List of shipwrecks: 26 June 1779
Ship	State	Description
Unnamed	Great Britain	American Revolution: The British supply ship blew up during a battle with US ships in the Stono River, South Carolina.

=== Unknown date ===
List of shipwrecks: Unknown date in June 1779
Ship	State	Description
Nancy	Great Britain	American Revolutionary War: The ship was sunk by the privateer General Arnold (United States). Her crew were rescued. She was on a voyage from Liverpool, Lancashire to Porto, Portugal.

== July ==
=== 24 July ===
List of shipwrecks: 24 July 1779
Ship	State	Description
Woestduin	Dutch East India Company	The East Indiaman ran aground off Vlissingen and was wrecked.

== August ==
=== 14 August ===
List of shipwrecks: 14 August 1779
Ship	State	Description
Defence	United States	American Revolution, Penobscot expedition:The privateer brig or brigantine was run aground at Bangor, New Ireland in a fight with Royal Navy ships and destroyed to prevent capture, or scuttled in the harbor of Stockton Springs, Massachusetts/New Ireland.
Hunter	United States	American Revolution, Penobscot expedition:The privateer was run aground on the west shore of Penobscot Bay in a fight with Royal Navy ships and destroyed to prevent capture.
Samuel	United States	American Revolution, Penobscot expedition: The Ordinance transport ran aground in Penobscot Bay and was abandoned a day or more earlier. Later drifted off and was remanned and taken up river. She was run aground again and burned 2 miles south of Oak Point to prevent her capture by the British. She was destroyed when her cargo of gun powder exploded.
Two unnamed vessels	United States	American Revolution: Penobscot expedition: Two transport ships ran aground in Penobscot Bay and were burned to prevent her capture by the British.

=== 16 August ===
List of shipwrecks: 16 August 1779
Ship	State	Description
Black Prince	United States	American Revolution: Penobscot expedition:The privateer ship was burned in the Penobscot River below the Falls, slightly below the mouth of Kenduskeag Stream, to prevent capture.
USS Diligence	(United States) Continental Navy	American Revolution: Penobscot expedition: The brig was scuttled in the Penobscot River 2 miles below the falls at Bangor, Massachusetts/New Ireland to prevent her capture by the British.
Hazzard	United States	American Revolution: Penobscot expedition: The vessel was burned in the Penobscot River below the Falls to prevent capture.
Hector	United States	American Revolution: Penobscot expedition: The vessel was burned in the Penobscot River below the Falls, slightly below the mouth of Kenduskeag Stream, to prevent capture.
Monmouth	United States	American Revolution: Penobscot expedition: The vessel was burned in the Penobscot River below the Falls, slightly below the mouth of Kenduskeag Stream, to prevent capture. She was destroyed when her gun powder exploded.
Pidgeon	United States	American Revolution: Penobscot expedition: The transport was burned in the Penobscot River below the Falls, slightly below the mouth of Kenduskeag Stream, to prevent capture.
USS Providence	(United States) Continental Navy	American Revolution: Penobscot expedition: The sloop was scuttled in the Penobscot River to prevent her capture by the British.
Tyrannicide	Massachusetts State Navy	American Revolution: Penobscot expedition: The brig was set afire and destroyed at Bangor, New Ireland to prevent her being captured by the British.
Valentine	British East India Company	The East Indiaman was lost off Brecqhou, Channel Islands.
Vengance	United States	American Revolution: Penobscot expedition: The privateer was burned in the Penobscot River below the Falls to prevent capture.
USS Warren	(United States) Continental Navy	American Revolution: Penobscot expedition: The frigate was scuttled in the Penobscot River at Oak Point near the town of Winterport, Massachusetts/New Ireland to prevent her capture by the British.

=== 19 August ===
List of shipwrecks: 19 August 1779
Ship	State	Description
Zurac Cat	Spain	The ship was lost near Bordeaux, France. She was on a voyage from London, Great Britain to San Sebastián.

=== 29 August ===
List of shipwrecks: 29 August 1779
Ship	State	Description
Unnamed	Great Britain	American Revolutionary War: The brigantine went ashore at Manasquan, New Jersey. Vessel is salvaged and refloated by locals.
Unnamed	Great Britain	American Revolutionary War: The schooner went ashore at Manasquan, New Jersey. Vessel is salvaged and refloated by locals.

=== 29 August ===
List of shipwrecks: 29 August 1779
Ship	State	Description
Stafford	British East India Company	The East Indiaman was lost in the Bengal River, India.

=== Unknown date ===
List of shipwrecks: Unknown date in August 1779
Ship	State	Description
Admiral Barrington	Great Britain	The ship was driven ashore at Liverpool, Lancashire.
Charming Sally	United States	American Revolutionary War, Penobscot expedition: The privateer, a schooner, was scuttled between the 14th and 16th to prevent capture.
Defence	United States	American Revolutionary War, Penobscot expedition: The privateer, a brigantine, was scuttled in the Penobscot River on 12 or 13 August to prevent her capture by the British.
Hannah	United States	American Revolutionary War, Penobscot expedition: The privateer, a schooner, was scuttled between the 14th and 16th to prevent capture.
Nancy	United States	American Revolutionary War, Penobscot expedition: The privateer, a brig, was scuttled between the 14th and 16th to prevent capture.
Nossa Senhora do Socorro	Great Britain	The ship was wrecked at Cape Hague, France. She was on a voyage from Porto to London, Great Britain.
Rover	United States	American Revolutionary War, Penobscot expedition: The privateer, a sloop, was scuttled between the 14th and 16th to prevent capture.
Springbird	United States	American Revolutionary Wa, Penobscot expedition: The privateer, a sloop, was scuttled between the 14th and 16th to prevent capture.

== September ==
=== 5 September ===
List of shipwrecks: 5 September 1779
Ship	State	Description
Bellona	Great Britain	A privateer out of Exeter, the ship sank at Teignmouth, Devon with the loss of 39 lives.

=== 8 September ===
List of shipwrecks: 8 September 1779
Ship	State	Description
Mercury	Great Britain	The ship sprang a leak and foundered. Her crew were rescued. She was on a voyage from Saint Petersburg, Russia to London.

=== 15 September ===
List of shipwrecks: 15 September 1779
Ship	State	Description
Diana	Great Britain	Anglo-French War (1778–83): The ship was captured by Greyhound and Serpent (both French Navy) and burnt. She was on a voyage from Middlesbrough, Yorkshire to Memel, Prussia.

=== 19 September ===
List of shipwrecks: 19 September 1779
Ship	State	Description
HMS Rose	(Kingdom of Great Britain) Royal Navy	The Seaford-class post ship was scuttled at Savannah, Georgia, United States.
L'Amitie	Kingdom of France	The ship was lost whilst on a voyage from Saint-Domingue to Bordeaux.
HM Hired armed ship Savannah	(Kingdom of Great Britain) Royal Navy	The ship was scuttled at Savannah.

=== 22 September ===
List of shipwrecks: 22 September 1779
Ship	State	Description
Nataliya (Наталия, 'Natalie')	Russia	The frigate ran aground off Terschelling in the West Frisian Islands and was wrecked. All on board were rescued. She was on a voyage from Kronstadt, Russia to an English port.

=== 25 September ===
List of shipwrecks: 25 September 1779
Ship	State	Description
USS Bonhomme Richard	(United States) Continental Navy	American Revolutionary War, Battle of Flamborough Head: The ship sank following an engagement with HMS Serapis ( (Kingdom of Great Britain) Royal Navy) off Flamborough Head, Yorkshire on 23 September.

=== Unknown date ===
List of shipwrecks: Unknown date in September 1779
Ship	State	Description
Stafford	Great Britain	The ship was lost in the Bengal River, India.

== October ==
=== 6 October ===
List of shipwrecks: 6 October 1779
Ship	State	Description
HMS Quebec	(Kingdom of Great Britain) Royal Navy	HMS Quebec and Surveillante. Anglo-French War (1778–83), Action of 6 October 1779: The Niger-class frigate caught fire, exploded and sank during an engagement with Surveillante (French Navy). Survivors were rescued by Surveillante, L'Expedition (French Navy) and HMS Rambler ( (Kingdom of Great Britain) Royal Navy).

=== 15 October ===
List of shipwrecks: 15 October 1779
Ship	State	Description
Sukey	Great Britain	The ship departed from Newfoundland, British America for Lisbon, Portugal. No further trace, presumed foundered in the Atlantic Ocean with the loss of all hands.

=== 29 October ===
List of shipwrecks: 29 October 1779
Ship	State	Description
Stag	Great Britain	The privateer ran aground in the River Mersey and was severely damaged. She was refloated in mid-November and taken in for repairs.

=== 30 October ===
List of shipwrecks: 30 October 1779
Ship	State	Description
Sturdy Beggar	Great Britain	The privateer was driven ashore and wrecked at Faial Island, Azores with the loss of four of her crew.

=== Unknown date ===
List of shipwrecks: Unknown date in October 1779
Ship	State	Description
Humber	Great Britain	The ship was wrecked on Læsø, Denmark. She was on a voyage from Hull, Yorkshire to Memel, Prussia.
Lovely Cruizer	Great Britain	The ship foundered in The Downs. She was on a voyage from Carmarthen to London.
May	Great Britain	The schooner was driven ashore and wrecked at Brighthelmstone, Sussex. She was on a voyage from Guernsey, Channel Islands to London.
St. Antonia	Grand Duchy of Tuscany	The ship was driven ashore and wrecked on the south coast of the Isle of Wight, Great Britain. She was on a voyage from Livorno to London.
Unity	Great Britain	The ship was lost off Bognor, Sussex. She was on a voyage from Arundel, Sussex to Liverpool, Lancashire.

== November ==
=== 1 November ===
List of shipwrecks: 1 November 1779
Ship	State	Description
Portsmouth	Great Britain	The privateer foundered in the Atlantic Ocean (41°45′N 26°50′W). Her crew were rescued by Hector ( (Kingdom of Great Britain) Guernsey).

=== 3 November ===
List of shipwrecks: 3 November 1779
Ship	State	Description
Diligence	Great Britain	The ship was driven ashore at Riga, Russia.

=== 9 November ===
List of shipwrecks: 9 November 1779
Ship	State	Description
Elizabeth and Bell	Great Britain	The ship was wrecked on Öland, Sweden. She was on a voyage from Riga, Russia to Hull, Yorkshire.
Fanny	Great Britain	The ship was wrecked on Öland. She was on a voyage from Saint Petersburg, Russia to Montrose, Forfarshire.

=== 10 November ===
List of shipwrecks: 10 November 1779
Ship	State	Description
William and Mary	Great Britain	The ship sprang a leak and foundered in the North Sea off the coast of Norfolk. Her crew were rescued. She was on a voyage from Sunderland, County Durham to London.

=== 11 November ===
List of shipwrecks: 11 November 1779
Ship	State	Description
Akhtapom (Ахтапом)	Imperial Russian Navy	The transport ship was holed by ice and sank off the ru:Krivaya Spit in the Sea of Azov. Her crew survived. She was on a voyage from the ru:Petrovskaya Fortress to Taganrog. Another source gives the year as 1778.

=== 13 November ===
List of shipwrecks: 13 November 1779
Ship	State	Description
York Union	Great Britain	The ship was wrecked on the Cockle Sand, in the North Sea off the coast of Norfolk. Her crew were rescued. She was on a voyage from Boston, Lincolnshire to London.

=== 16 November ===
List of shipwrecks: 16 November 1779
Ship	State	Description
Valentine	British East India Company	The East Indiaman sailing from Shannon to London was wrecked on the Casquets, off Brecqhou, Channel Islands in a gale. Her crew were rescued.

=== 20 November ===
List of shipwrecks: 20 November 1779
Ship	State	Description
Racehorse	Great Britain	The ship departed from New Providence, New Jersey, United States for London. No further trace, presumed foundered with the loss of all hands.

=== 25 November ===
List of shipwrecks: 25 November 1779
Ship	State	Description
Griffin	Great Britain	The ship was lost near Beaumaris, Anglesey with the loss of all on board. She was on a voyage from Liverpool, Lancashire to Africa.
Richard	Great Britain	The ship was lost near Beaumaris with the loss of 32 of the 50 people on board. She was on a voyage from Liverpool to the West Indies.

=== 26 November ===
List of shipwrecks: 26 November 1779
Ship	State	Description
London Paquet	(Kingdom of Great Britain) Jersey	The ship was driven ashore at Margate, Kent and severely damaged. She was on a voyage from London to Jersey.

=== Unknown date ===
List of shipwrecks: Unknown date in November 1779
Ship	State	Description
Bess	Great Britain	The ship was lost in Carnarvon Bay. She was on a voyage from Liverpool, Lancashire to the West Indies.
Betsey	Great Britain	The ship was driven ashore near Newcastle upon Tyne, Northumberland. She was on a voyage from Gothenburg, Sweden to Leith, Lothian.
Briton	Great Britain	The ship was wrecked on Læsø, Denmark. Her crew were rescued. She was on a voyage from Ostend, Dutch Republic to Riga, Russia.
Elizabeth	Great Britain	The ship was driven ashore and wrecked at Whitby, Yorkshire. She was on a voyage from Memel, Prussia to a Scottish port.
Nossa Senhora da Assunção	Portugal	The ship was wrecked at Porto. She was on a voyage from London, Great Britain to Porto.
Prince of Prussia	Ireland	The ship was wrecked on the coast of Scotland. She was on a voyage from Dublin to Königsberg, Prussia.
Providence	Great Britain	The ship sank near the Poolbeg Lighthouse, County Dublin, Ireland. She was later refloated. Providence was on a voyage from Dublin to London.
Spitfire	Great Britain	The privateer foundered with the loss of all 120 crew.
St. Miguel e Almas	Portugal	The ship ran aground in the River Thames at Greenwich, Kent, Great Britain. She was on a voyage from London to Lisbon.
Thetis	Kingdom of France	Anglo-French War (1778–83) The ship, a prize of Swallow ( (Kingdom of Great Britain) Jersey), was attacked and sunk in the Atlantic Ocean 12 leagues (36 nautical miles (67 km) west south west of the Isles of Scilly, Great Britain by a privateer. Her crew were rescued.
Thomas & Martha	Great Britain	The ship was driven ashore in the River Thames at Deptford, Kent. She was on a voyage from London to the West Indies.

== December ==
=== 2 December ===
List of shipwrecks: 2 December 1779
Ship	State	Description
Cato	Great Britain	The storeship ran aground on the Pausand. Her crew were rescued. She was on a voyage from London to Antigua.
Fothergill	Great Britain	The ship was lost off the Isle of Wight with the loss of three of her crew. She was on a voyage from Newfoundland, British America to Pool, Dorset.

=== 3 December ===
List of shipwrecks: 3 December 1779
Ship	State	Description
George	Sweden	The ship was driven ashore and wrecked on the coast of France. Eleven of her crew were rescued. She was on a voyage from Stockholm to Portsmouth, Hampshire, Great Britain.

=== 10 December ===
List of shipwrecks: 10 December 1779
Ship	State	Description
Henry and Samuel	Great Britain	The ship was run down and sunk in the English Channel off Fairlee, Isle of Wight by a Swedish vessel. Her crew were rescued. She was on a voyage from Lisbon, Portugal to London.

=== 11 December ===
List of shipwrecks: 11 December 1779
Ship	State	Description
HMS North	(Kingdom of Great Britain) Royal Navy	The sloop-of-war was wrecked at Halifax, Nova Scotia, British North America with the loss of 170 lives.
St. Helena	Great Britain	The ship was wrecked at Halifax.

=== 16 December ===
List of shipwrecks: 16 December 1779
Ship	State	Description
Boll	Great Britain	The brig was driven ashore and wrecked at Madeira with the loss of three of her crew. She was on a voyage from London to New York, United States.
De Jeffrow Amelida	Dutch Republic	The brig was driven ashore and wrecked at Madeira. Her crew were rescued. She was on a voyage from Amsterdam to Sint Eustatius.
Knotts-green	Great Britain	The full-rigged ship was driven ashore and wrecked at Madeira with the loss of 21 of her crew.
Leonora	Great Britain	The brig was driven ashore and wrecked at Madeira with the loss of three of her crew. She was on a voyage from Madeira to Penzance, Cornwall.

=== 25 December ===
List of shipwrecks: 25 December 1779
Ship	State	Description
Crawford	Great Britain	The transport ship foundered in the Atlantic Ocean. Her crew were rescued by Catharine (Great Britain). She was on a voyage from New York to Castlehaven, County Cork, Ireland.
John and Jane	Great Britain	The victualling ship foundered in the Atlantic Ocean. Her crew were rescued. She was on a voyage from New York to Castlehaven.

=== 27 December ===
List of shipwrecks: 27 December 1779
Ship	State	Description
Bridgetown	Great Britain	The ship was driven ashore near Walmer Castle, Kent. She was on a voyage from London to Barbados. Bridgetown was later refloated and taken in to Dover, Kent.
Eleanor	Great Britain	The ship was driven ashore near Walmer Castle. She was on a voyage from London to Antigua.
Royall Clubb	Great Britain	The transport ship was driven ashore near Walmer Castle. She was later refloated and taken in to Dover.

=== 28 December ===
List of shipwrecks: 28 December 1779
Ship	State	Description
Britannia	Great Britain	American Revolutionary War:The privateer went ashore at Sandy Hook, New Jersey. Crew captured.

=== Unknown date ===
List of shipwrecks: Unknown date in December 1779
Ship	State	Description
Bellona	Great Britain	The ship was lost at the mouth of the Elbe.
Betsey	Great Britain	The transport ship was wrecked near New York, United States.
Cheerful Cousin	Great Britain	The ship was driven ashore on the Dutch coast. She was on a voyage from Pärnu, Russia to Bordeaux, France.
HMS Duc de la Vauginon	(Kingdom of Great Britain) Royal Navy	The cutter foundered in the North Sea in mid-December.
Edward	Great Britain	The ship was driven ashore near Brielle, Dutch Republic. She was on a voyage from Limerick, Ireland to London.
Friendship	Great Britain	The ship was wrecked on the Dutch coast. She was on a voyage from Saint Petersburg, Russia to London.
Jaager	Danzig	The ship was driven ashore and wrecked on Ameland, Dutch Republic. She was on a voyage from Danzig to Waterford, Ireland.
Love and Unity	Great Britain	The transport ship foundered in the Atlantic Ocean off Land's End, Cornwall. Her crew were rescued.
Minerva	Great Britain	The ship capsized in the River Avon at Hotwells, Gloucestershire. She was on a voyage from Bristol, Gloucestershire to Jamaica.
Nossa Senhora de Conceicao	Portugal	The ship was wrecked on the south coast of the Isle of Wight, Great Britain. She was on a voyage from Faro to London.
Nossa Senhora de Madre de Deus e Santo António	Portugal	The ship ran aground in the River Thames at Cuckold's Point and was wrecked. She was on a voyage from London to Porto.
Pallas	Great Britain	The privateer ran aground on the Hoyle Bank, in Liverpool Bay. She was refloated on 13 December.
Pearl		The ship was lost whilst on a voyage from Livorno, Grand Duchy of Tuscany to Hamburg.
Peggy	Ireland	The ship was lost on the "Islands of Ely". She was on a voyage from Saint Petersburg to Belfast, County Antrim.
Sacramento	Portugal	The ship was driven ashore at Exmouth, Devon, Great Britain. She was on a voyage from Porto to Plymouth and Topsham, Devon.
Porgey	Great Britain	The ship departed from Bermuda for New York. No further trace, presumed foundered with the loss of all hands.
Rossi	Great Britain	The ship departed from Newfoundland, British America for the Leeward Islands. No further trace, presumed foundered in the Atlantic Ocean with the loss of all hands.
Sally and Ann	Great Britain	The ship was driven ashore at Beachy Head, Sussex.
Unity	Great Britain	The ship was lost near Calais, France. She was on a voyage from Aberdeen to Porto.

== Unknown date ==
List of shipwrecks: Unknown date in 1779
Ship	State	Description
Active	Great Britain	American Revolutionary War: The ship was burnt at St. Mary's, Newfoundland, British America by American privateers.
Aliance	Kingdom of France	The ship was lost whilst on a voyage from Saint-Domingue to Bordeaux.
Amazon	Great Britain	The ship was destroyed by fire whilst on a voyage from Jamaica to Bristol, Gloucestershire.
Andrei Pervozyanni I	Russia	The vessel was lost during a voyage in the Catherine Archipelago from Attu Island to Amchitka.
Antigua Planter	Great Britain	The ship foundered in the Atlantic Ocean. Her crew were rescued. She was on a voyage from Jamaica to London.
Belcour	Great Britain	American Revolutionary War The ship exploded and sank in an engagement with Minerve (French Navy) with the loss of 22 of her crew. She was on a voyage from Halifax, Nova Scotia, British America to Jamaica.
Betsey	United States	The ship was wrecked on the coast of New Jersey. She was on a voyage from Providence, Rhode Island to New York.
Bryans	Great Britain	The ship was lost at Jamaica.
Cardinal de Bernis	Kingdom of France	The ship was lost near Puerto Rico.
Chance	Great Britain	The brig was run down and sunk by HMS Russell ( (Kingdom of Great Britain) Royal Navy) with the loss of all hands. She was on a voyage from London to Quebec, British America.
Christopher	Great Britain	The ship was destroyed by fire at Rhode Island, United States.
Colpoys	Great Britain	The ship was lost near Long Island, Rhode Island, United States. She was on a voyage from Saint Kitts to New York, United States.
Comet Paquet	Great Britain	The ship was lost whilst on a voyage from Pensacola, Florida, British America to Jamaica.
Cumberland	Great Britain	The ship was lost at Newfoundland. She was on a voyage from Bristol to Quebec.
Dorothy & Mary	Great Britain	The ship foundered in the Gulf of Florida. She was on a voyage from Jamaica to London.
Eleanor	Great Britain	The ship was lost at Jamaica.
Fly	Great Britain	The ship foundered whilst on a voyage from Jamaica to London.
Friendship	Great Britain	The ship was lost at Jamaica.
HMS Glasgow	(Kingdom of Great Britain) Royal Navy	The sixth rate post ship was destroyed by fire in Montego Bay, Jamaica.
Grampus	Great Britain	The storeship foundered in the Grand Banks of Newfoundland. She was on a voyage from Newfoundland to Portsmouth, Hampshire.
Harlequin	Great Britain	The ship was lost whilst on a voyage from New York to London.
Harlequin	Kingdom of France	American Revolutionary War: The ship was captured by a frigate and two Men-of-War, but was lost going in to Jamaica.
Hope	Great Britain	The ship was wrecked at Richelieu, Quebec. She was on a voyage from London to Quebec.
Joyeaux	Kingdom of France	Anglo-French War (1778–83): The ship was driven ashore at Saint-Domingue by four privateers and was wrecked. She was on a voyage from Cayenne to Saint-Domingue.
La Basseterre	Kingdom of France	The ship was lost whilst on a voyage from the French West Indies to France.
La Marseilles	Kingdom of France	The ship was lost whilst on a voyage from the French West Indies to France.
La Pauline	Kingdom of France	The ship was lost whilst on a voyage from the French West Indies to France.
Le Guerrier	Kingdom of France	The ship was lost whilst on a voyage from the French West Indies to France.
Le Victoire	Kingdom of France	The ship was lost whilst on a voyage from the French West Indies to France.
Lord Townsend	Great Britain	The ship was destroyed by fire at Jamaica.
Mary	Great Britain	The ship was capsized by a whirlwind off Sandy Hook, New Jersey, United States. She was on a voyage from Saint Kitts to New York.
Mermaid	Great Britain	The ship was driven ashore and wrecked at Egg Harbour, New Jersey, United States with the loss of more than 102 lives. She was on a voyage from Hallifax, Nova Scotia, British America to New York.
Nancy	Great Britain	The ship foundered in the Atlantic Ocean. She was on a voyage from Jamaica to Bristol.
Pickering	United States	American Revolutionary War: The 20-gun ship was driven ashore and wrecked on Barbados in an engagement with HMS Aurora ( (Kingdom of Great Britain) Royal Navy).
Pinson	Great Britain	The ship was wrecked on Labrador, British America. She was on a voyage from Bristol to Cork and Labrador.
Sarah and Rachel	Dutch Republic	The ship was lost near Antigua. Her crew survived. She was on a voyage from Amsterdam to Sint Eustatius.
Speedwell	Great Britain	The schooner was lost at Manchioneal, Jamaica. She was on a voyage from Manchioneal to the Bahamas.
St Joseph	Portugal	The ship was lost whilst on a voyage from Lisbon to Havre de Grâce, France.
HMS Supply	(Kingdom of Great Britain) Royal Navy	The storeship was destroyed by fire at Saint Kitts.
Tom	Great Britain	The ship was destroyed by fire at St. George's, Grenada.
HMS Tortoise	Great Britain	The store ship foundered in the Grand Banks of Newfoundland. She was on a voyage from Newfoundland to Portsmouth.
