= List of ship launches in 1767 =

The list of ship launches in 1767 includes a chronological list of some ships launched in 1767.

Date	Ship	Class	Builder	Location	Country	Notes
28 February	Warwick	Fourth rate	Thomas Bucknall	Portsmouth Dockyard	Great Britain	For Royal Navy.
15 March	San Francisco de Asis	San Juan Nepomuceno-class ship of the line	Manuel de Zubiria	Guarnizo	Great Britain	For Spanish Navy.
6 April	Meskin-i Gazi	Fourth rate		Constantinople	Ottoman Empire	For Ottoman Navy.
26 April	Mignonne	Frigate	Claude Saussillon	Toulon	Kingdom of France	For French Navy.
30 April	Santa Isabel	Velasco-class ship of the line	Augustin & Juan de Monteceli	Carthagena	Spain	For Spanish Navy.
April	Gorée	Schooner	Jean-Denis Chavillard	Rochefort	Kingdom of France	For French Navy.
22 August	Renommée	Frigate		Brest	Kingdom of France	For French Navy.
26 August	Marlborough	Ramillies-class ship of the line	Adam Hayes	Deptford Dockyard	Great Britain	For Royal Navy.
27 September	Brisson	Marquis de Castres-class flûte	François Caro	Lorient	Kingdom of France	For Compagnie des Indes.
Unknown date	San Luis	Second rate	Matthew Mullins	Havana	(Spain) Cuba	For Spanish Navy.
5 October	Actif	Citoyen-class ship of the line		Brest	Kingdom of France	For French Navy.
26 October	Otter	Sloop of war	Adam Hayes	Deptford Dockyard	Great Britain	For Royal Navy.
21 November	Swan	Swan-class ship-sloop		Plymouth Dockyard	Great Britain	For Royal Navy.
November	Christian VII	Second rate	Krabbe	Copenhagen	Denmark-Norway	For Dano-Norwegian Navy.
22 December	Actionnaire	Indien-class East Indiaman	Gilles Cambry	Lorient	Kingdom of France	For French Navy.
23 December	Ajax	Third rate	Thomas Bucknall	Portsmouth Dockyard	Great Britain	For Royal Navy.
April or May	Aurore	Corvette		Havre de Grâce	Kingdom of France	For French Navy.
Unknown date	Almsbury	Merchantman			Thirteen Colonies	For Enderby & Co.
Unknown date	Beverwijk	Fifth rate	Peter Edwards	Amsterdam	Dutch Republic	For Dutch Navy.
Unknown date	Cartier	Merchantman		Bombay	India	For Fairlie, Gilmore & Co.
Unknown date	España	Man-of-War	Arsenal de la Carraca	Cádiz	Spain	For Spanish Navy.
Unknown date	Gazal-ı Bahri	Fourth rate			Ottoman Empire	For Ottoman Navy.
Unknown date	Governor	Yacht		Bombay	India	For British East India Company.
Unknown date	Granby	East Indiaman	William Dudman	Deptford	Great Britain	For British East India Company.
Unknown date	Afrique	Afrique-class schooner	Jean-Dennis Chevillard	Rochefort	Kingdom of France	For French Navy.
Unknown date	Heureuse Marie	Heureuse Marie-class gabarre		Brest	Kingdom of France	For French Navy.
Unknown date	Marie Marguerite	Heureuse Marie-class gabarre		Brest	Kingdom of France	For French Navy.
Unknown date	Peleng-ı Bahri	Third rate			Ottoman Empire	For Ottoman Navy.
Unknown date	Nasir-ı Cenk	Fifth rate			Ottoman Empire	For Ottoman Navy.
Unknown date	Phoenix	Schooner		Bombay	India	For Bombay Pilot Service.
Unknown date	Saint Nicolas	Snow	Antonio Attuna	Bordeaux	Kingdom of France	For French Navy.
Unknown date	Seahorse	East Indiaman			Great Britain	For British East India Company.
Unknown date	Seyyar-i Bahri	Fourth rate		Rhodes	Ottoman Greece	For Ottoman Navy.
Unknown date	Slesvig	Fourth rate			Denmark-Norway	For Dano-Norwegian Navy.
Unknown date	Sultana	Schooner	Benjamin Hallowell	Boston, Massachusetts	Thirteen Colonies	For Royal Navy.
Unknown date	Thetis	Fifth rate	Jan Salomonszoon van den Tempel	Rotterdam	Dutch Republic	For Dutch Navy.
Unknown date	Tombaz-ı Kebir	Sixth rate			Ottoman Empire	For Ottoman Navy.
Unknown date	Ukab-ı Kebir	Third rate			Ottoman Empire	For Ottoman Navy.
Unknown date	Walcheren	Sixth rate			Dutch Republic	For Dutch Navy.
