= HMS Port Royal =

At least four ships of the Royal Navy have borne the name HMS Port Royal, after the British naval base Port Royal in Jamaica:

- HMS Port Royal (1757) was an 18-gun sloop that was purchased locally, i.e., in Jamaica, in 1757. She was paid off and sold in 1763.
- HMS Port Royal (1778) was an 18-gun sloop, formerly the French armed merchant vessel Comte de Maurepas, which the British captured in 1778. They purchased her, armed her with eighteen 6-pounder guns, and gave her the name Port Royal; she was under the command of Commander Timothy Kelly when the Spanish captured her at Pensacola in 1781.
- HMS Port Royal (1782) was the 14-gun French privateer ship-sloop Comte d'Estaing, which HMS Fortune captured on 29 March 1782. She was commissioned under Lieutenant George Hart but paid off on 31 March 1783 and sold thereafter. (Note: A Comte d'Estaing was apparently launched in 1780 but grounded at Glénans that same year. She was either refloated or there may have been a successor vessel of the same name.)
- HMS Port Royal (1796) was a 10-gun schooner purchased in 1796. The French captured her on 30 March 1797 and renamed her Perle. Pelican recaptured her on 18 October. The Royal Navy renamed her HMS Recovery. She was sold in 1801.
