= Countess of Scarborough =

History

Great Britain
- Name: Countess of Scarborough
- Owner: Hammond
- Operator: Royal Navy
- Builder: Whitby
- Launched: 1777
- Captured: 1779

General characteristics
- Tons burthen: 500 (bm)
- Armament: 22 guns

Countess of Scarborough was launched at Whitby in 1777. The Royal Navy hired her as a hired armed ship in 1777. She participated in the capture of two privateers before she and HMS Serapis succumbed to a small American flotilla off Flamborough Head in 1779. She briefly became a French privateer. Her subsequent fate is unknown.

== Hired armed ship ==
Countess of Scarborough first appeared in Lloyd's Register (LR)) in 1778 with Hammond, master, Hammond, Sr., owner, and trade Whitby.

The Royal Navy commissioned Countess of Scarborough in November 1777 under the command of Captain Thomas Piercy.

Countess of Scarborough and Medea shared in the capture, on 17 June 1779, of the French privateers Duc de la Vauguyon and Comte de Maurepas. Medea captured Duc de la Vauguyon (or Duc de Lavaugnon) of Dunkirk, a cutter of 14 guns and 98 men, after a fight of an hour. The fight cost the French four men killed and ten wounded; Medea had no casualties. Duc de la Vauguyon had been launched in 1779 and was under the command of Commandante Marin Le Page. The British took her into service as Duc de la Vauginon. (Note: Demerliac shows her as being either from Dunkirk, but more probably Honfleur.,)

Duc de la Vauguyon had captured and ransomed a lobster smack sailing from Norway to Britain. The master of the smack informed Captain James Montague of Medea that the privateer had had a consort. Medea's rigging was too cut up for her to pursue the consort, so Montague sent Piercy after her. Piercy caught up with Compte de Maurepas after a few hours and the privateer struck without resistance. (Note: Demerliac and English records give her name as Comtesse de Maurepas, and her origin as Boulogne. The report of her capture gives her name as above, and her origin as Dunkirk.) She was armed with fourteen 4-pounder guns and had a crew of 87 men. (Note: A number of sources claim, incorrectly, that this vessel became HMS Port Royal. That Comte de Maurepas was a French armed merchant vessel that the squadron under Captain Joseph Deane in HMS Ruby captured off Cap-François on 13 October 1778. Rear-Admiral Parker ordered her purchased and commissioned in 1778.)

== Battle ==
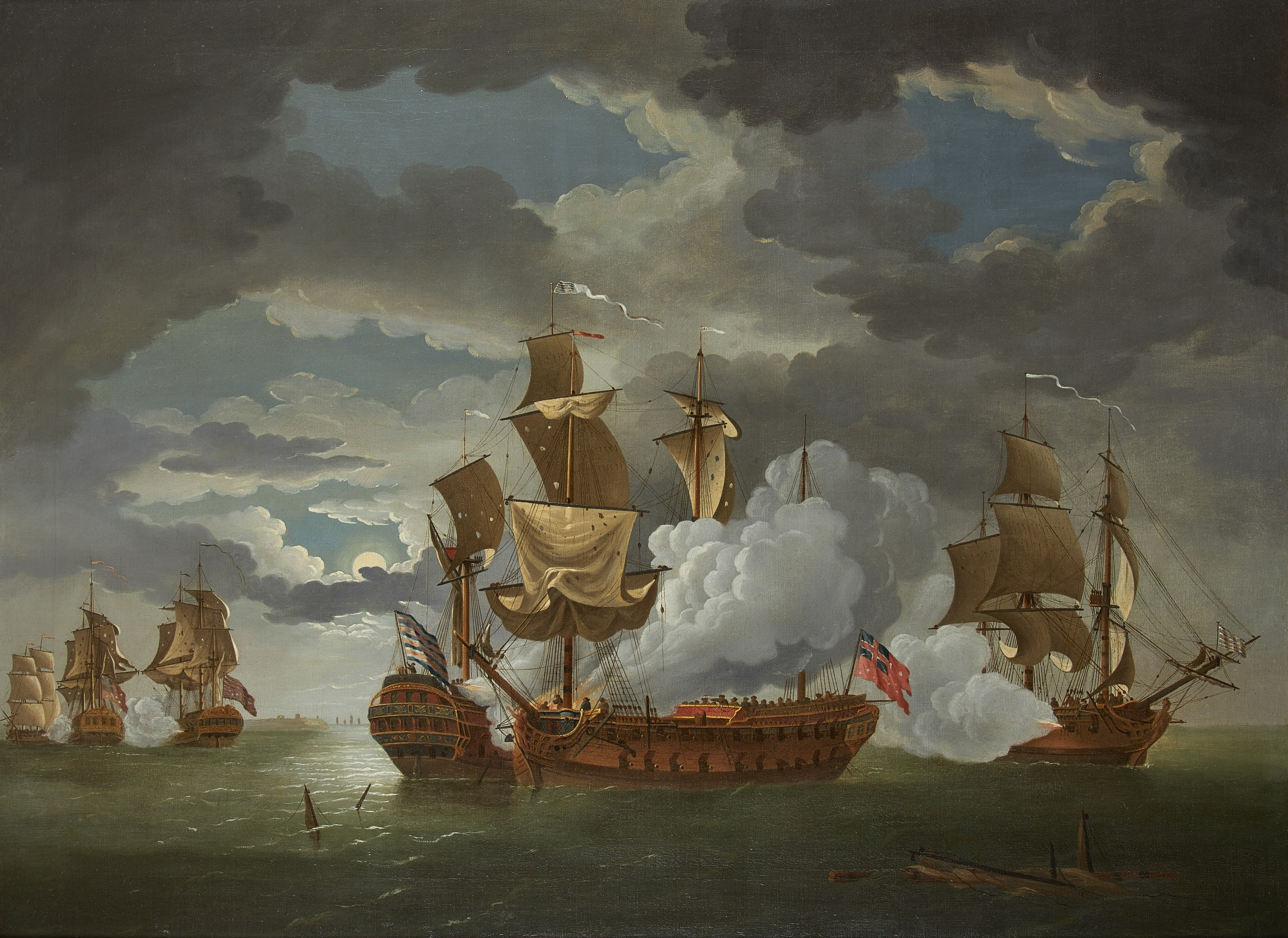
The action between the Serapis, Capt. Pearson, and Paul Jones's Squadron. The Countess of Scarborough engaging with the USS Pallas on the far left of this painting by Richard Paton

On 23 September 1779 Serapis and Countess of Scarborough were escorting the Baltic fleet home when they encountered a small Franco-American squadron under the command John Paul Jones in Bonhomme Richard, and including the frigates Alliance and Pallas. Bonhomme Richard, and sporadically Alliance, engaged Serapis, ultimately capturing her. Countess of Scarborough sailed to engage Pallas, which was armed with 32 guns. The battle with Pallas lasted some two hours. After Countess of Scarborough had sustained much damage and suffered heavy casualties, Piercy observed another frigate coming up on her larboard quarter; Piercy then surrendered. In the battle, Countess of Scarborough lost four men killed and 20 men wounded, three of whom later died. All her braces, the great part of the running rigging, and her main and mizen top-sail sheets were shot away. Also, enemy fire had dismounted seven of her guns.

At the onset of the action the merchant vessels separated. Most took shelter near Scarborough. Two went to Hull. By their resistance, Serapis and Countess of Scarborough saved the Baltic fleet from capture.

== Aftermath ==
The court martial on 10 March 1780 for the loss of his ship acquitted Piercy, his officers and men, stating they "have in the execution of such duty done infinite credit to themselves by a very obstinate defence against a superior force." Piercy soon after received a promotion to post-captain. The Court of Directors of the Royal Exchange Assurance Company voted to present him with a piece of plate worth 50 guineas, "as a testimony of their approbation of his bravery and conduct in protecting the valuable fleet from the Baltic under his care." The Scarborough Borough Council on 25 October 1779 presented Piercy with the "Freedom of the Borough" and a silver casket lined with heart of oak made by James Phipps of London (c. 1779–1783). Piercy died on 1 October 1793 and was interred in the cloisters of Canterbury Cathedral.

Casket
Since his death the casket has accompanied every HMS Scarborough. In 1972, after the decommissioning of the last HMS Scarborough, Captain W.J. Graham, her last commander, handed the casket to the Scarborough Borough Council, requesting that the Council retain the casket until such time as there was a new HMS Scarborough; the casket then rested at Scarborough's town hall until the town transferred it to the Hull Maritime Museum where it is currently on display.

== French privateer ==
Her prize crew brought Countess of Scarborough first to Holland, and then to Dunkirk, where she was sold. She became a French privateer, while initially retaining her name. Her ultimate fate is unknown, suggesting that she may have been renamed later.
