= Jean de Brun de Boades =

French Navy officer of the War of American Independence

- Military career
- Allegiance: France
- Branch: Navy
- Rank: Chef d'Escadre
- Commands: Lion
- Conflicts: War of American Independence

Jean de Brun de Boades was a French Navy officer. He served in the War of American Independence.

== Biography ==
In 1778, he commanded the 64-gun Lion, part of the squadron under Louis de Fabry de Fabrègues, along with the 74-gun Destin and Victoire, the 64-gun Hardi and Caton, and the frigates Gracieuse and Flore.

On 14 May 1781, he commanded the 74-gun Actif and pursued British ships off Brest. On the morning of 15, he engaged the 64-gun HMS Nonsuch, which managed to escape. Actif returned to Brest on 18. In recognition of his action, the Crown awarded him a 1000-Livre pension.

On 20 August 1784, he was promoted to Chef d'Escadre.

Boades' nephew, the Chevalier de Boades, also the served in the French Navy. He commanded the frigate Magicienne and died of wounds sustained at the Battle of the Chesapeake where he commanded the 64-gun Triton.

== Sources and references ==
Notes

Citations

Bibliography

- Lacour-Gayet, Georges (1910). La marine militaire de la France sous le règne de Louis XVI. Paris: Honoré Champion.
- Roche, Jean-Michel (2005). Dictionnaire des bâtiments de la flotte de guerre française de Colbert à nos jours, 1671 - 1870. Group Retozel-Maury Millau. pp. 325–6. ISBN 978-2-9525917-0-6. OCLC 165892922.
- Troude, Onésime-Joachim (1867). Batailles navales de la France (in French). Vol. 2. Challamel ainé.

External links

- Archives nationales (2011). "Fonds Marine, sous-série B/4: Campagnes, 1571-1785" (PDF).
- Hiscocks, Richard (11 July 2017). "Nonsuch v Actif – 14/15 May 1781". More than Nelson.
