= Yom Kippur 1984 =

Poem by Adrienne Cecile Rich

Yom Kippur 1984 is a poem by the Jewish-American poet Adrienne Rich. One of Rich's key poems, it was reprinted in her 1986 collection Your Native Land, Your Life.

== About ==
The poem opens with two contradictory statements; a verse from the Torah, Leviticus 23:29; and a line from the poem Prelude by Robinson Jeffers. The poem goes on to explores questions of identity, difference, and solitude, particularly from the lens of oppressed groups such as women, gender nonconforming people, lesbians/gays, Jewish people, and Black people. The central focus of the poem is the tension between the desire for independence and individuality and the longing for community and belonging. The poem is named for Yom Kippur, the Jewish day of atonement, during which observant Jews engage in fasting, repentance, and self-examination.

Rich has stated that the poem took her a year to finish, during which time she was reading Robinson Jeffers, Walt Whitman, William Wordsworth, and the Tanakh.

The poem was composed at a time in Rich's life when she had moved from the East Coast to Santa Cruz, California, a city where she felt a lack of connection to Jewish ties. In "The Genesis of Yom Kippur 1984", the poem's 1987 companion essay, Rich outlined the key events during the 1980s that served as the impetus for the poem. The "young scholar shot at the university gates on a summer evening walk" referenced in the poem is Edmund Perry, a 17 year old Black teenager from Harlem who was shot to death in 1985 by a NYPD officer shortly after enrolling as a student at Stanford University. The line "faggot kicked into the icy river" is a reference to the 1984 killing of Charlie Howard, a young gay man from Bangor, Maine who was thrown into the Kenduskeag Stream. The poem also references a series of murders of women in the Santa Cruz Mountains committed in the 1970s by the serial killers John Linley Frazier, Edmund Kemper, and Herbert Mullin.

== See also ==
- Jewish ethics
- Jewish feminism
- Yom Kippur
