= Chevalier de Boades =

French Navy officer of the War of American Independence

The Chevalier de Brun de Boades ( — 7 September 1781) was a French Navy officer. He served in the War of American Independence.

== Biography ==
Brun de Boades was born to the family of a Council of the Parliament of Provence. His uncle, Jean de Brun de Boades, also served in the Navy, reaching the rank of Chef d'Escadre. Boades joined the Navy as Garde-Marine on 2 April 1748, and was promoted to Lieutenant on 15 January 1762.

He was promoted to Captain on 4 April 1777. In 1778, he captained the frigate Magicienne.

In 1780, Boades captained the 64-gun Triton in the squadron under Guichen. He died on 7 September 1781 of wounds sustained at the Battle of the Chesapeake.

== Sources and references ==
Notes

Citations

Bibliography

- Lacour-Gayet, Georges (1910). La marine militaire de la France sous le règne de Louis XVI. Paris: Honoré Champion.
- Dawson, Warrington (1936). "Les 2112 Français morts aux États-Unis de 1777 à 1783 en combattant pour l'indépendance américaine". Journal de la société des américanistes (28–1): 136.
- Kérallain, R. (1928). "Bougainville à l'armée du Cte de Grasse". Journal de la société des américanistes (20).
- Roche, Jean-Michel (2005). Dictionnaire des bâtiments de la flotte de guerre française de Colbert à nos jours, 1671 - 1870. Group Retozel-Maury Millau. pp. 325–6. ISBN 978-2-9525917-0-6. OCLC 165892922.
- Troude, Onésime-Joachim (1867). Batailles navales de la France (in French). Vol. 2. Challamel ainé.

External links

- Archives nationales (2011). "Fonds Marine, sous-série B/4: Campagnes, 1571-1785" (PDF).
