= Gaspard de Ligondès =

French Navy officer of the War of American Independence

Gaspard de Ligondès (Saint-Bonnet-de-Rochefort, 11 December 1732 – Brest, 26 January 1779) was a French Navy officer. He served in the American Revolutionary War.

== Biography ==
Ligondès was born to the family of a Navy officer. He joined the Navy as a Garde-Marine on 6 July 1750.

On 15 April 1761, Ligondès married Elisabeth de Reclesne. They had two sons, Hercule and Frédérick, both of whom also served in the Navy, and a daughter, Clotilde.

Ligondès was promoted to Lieutenant on 1 October 1764, and made a Knight in the Order of Saint Louis on 1 January 1773. In 1775, Ligondès was captain of the 12-gun corvette Écureuil, and the 14-gun Serin in 1777, on which he assisted an American ship while sailing from Brest to Saint-Domingue. He returned to Brest later that same year.

Ligondès was promoted to Captain on 4 April 1777.

Ligondès was given command of the 64-gun Triton. He captained her at the Battle of Ushant and in the action of 20 October 1778, where he was mortally wounded.

Ligondès died of his wound in Brest on 26 January 1779.
