= Killing of Edmund Perry =

1985 fatal police shooting in New York City

Edmund Perry, a Harlem resident, was shot to death by Lee Van Houten, a 24-year-old plainclothes policeman, on June 12, 1985, at the age of 17 years old. The case briefly generated a firestorm of protest in New York City when it was revealed that Perry was an honor student and was enrolled to attend Stanford on a scholarship; however, Van Houten said that Perry and his brother had attempted to mug him, and the shooting was ruled justifiable.

== The incident ==
Lee Van Houten, a 24-year-old plainclothes policeman, was on assignment in the Morningside Park section of Manhattan on the night of June 12, 1985, when he said he was assaulted by two men who attempted to mug him. According to Van Houten, he was approached from behind and yanked to the ground by his neck, where two black men beat him and demanded that he give them money. He drew his gun from his ankle holster and fired three times, hitting Edmund Perry in the abdomen. The other attacker fled, and was later identified as Jonah Perry, Edmund's brother.

== Reaction ==
At the time of his death, Perry was a recent graduate of Phillips Exeter Academy in Exeter, New Hampshire, one of the most prestigious preparatory schools in the United States. The revelation of this fact led to significant press coverage, much of it unfavorable to the police. The front-page headline of the New York Post the next day was "Cop Kills Harlem Honor Student". The Village Voice suggested that Perry was shot because he was "too black for his own good", and The New York Times wrote that "...the death of Edmund Perry raises painfully troubling questions".

However, two witnesses backed up Van Houten's version of events, and the media frenzy was short-lived. Van Houten was cleared of any culpability in the shooting. Jonah Perry, an alumnus of the Westminster School in Simsbury, Connecticut, was later put on trial for assaulting Van Houten. He was found not guilty. The NYPD settled a wrongful death claim for $75,000 in 1989. Veronica Perry, the mother of both boys and their sister Nicol, died in the city six years later on October 22, 1991, of a heart attack aged 44.

== In popular culture ==
Perry's experiences at Exeter and the circumstances surrounding his death formed the basis of the best-selling 1987 book Best Intentions: The Education and Killing of Edmund Perry, written by Robert Sam Anson.

On January 6, 1992, NBC aired the TV movie Murder Without Motive: The Edmund Perry Story, directed by Kevin Hooks. Perry was portrayed by Curtis McClarin.

Spike Lee's movie Do the Right Thing is dedicated to the family of Edmund Perry, among others.

The incident served as inspiration for the music video to Michael Jackson's 1987 hit song Bad.

Adrienne Rich's poem Yom Kippur 1984 contains a line about the killing of Edmund Perry: "young scholar shot at the university gates on a summer evening walk, his prizes and studies nothing, nothing availing his Blackness."
