= HMS Scarborough =

Ten ships of the Royal Navy have borne the name HMS Scarborough, after the town of Scarborough:

- HMS Scarborough (1691) was a 10-gun ketch launched in 1691 and captured by the French in 1693.
- HMS Scarborough (1694) was a 32-gun fifth-rate frigate launched in 1694. She was captured later that year by the French who renamed her Duc de Chaulnes, but she was recaptured in 1696 and renamed HMS Milford. She was rebuilt in 1705 and wrecked in 1720.
- HMS Scarborough (1696) was a 32-gun fifth rate launched in 1696 and captured by the French in 1710. She was recaptured in 1712 and renamed HMS Garland. She was sold in 1744.
- HMS Scarborough (1711) was a 32-gun fifth rate launched in 1711. She was rebuilt in 1720 as a 20-gun sixth rate and was sold in 1739.
- HMS Scarborough was a hospital ship purchased in 1739 and sold in 1744.
- HMS Scarborough (1740) was a 20-gun sixth rate launched in 1740 and sold in 1749.
- HMS Scarborough (1756) was a 22-gun sixth rate launched in 1756 that foundered in 1780.
- HMS Scarborough (1812) was a 74-gun third rate launched in 1812 and sold in 1836.
- HMS Scarborough (L25) was a Hastings-class sloop launched in 1930 and sold in 1949.
- HMS Scarborough (F63) was a Whitby-class frigate launched in 1955 and sold to Pakistan in 1975. She was not taken over however and was scrapped in 1977.

== See also ==
- HM hired armed ship Countess of Scarborough
