= Curtis McClarin =

American actor (1969–2014)

- Born: Curtis L. McClarin; December 19, 1969; New York City, U.S.
- Died: March 3, 2014 (aged 44); New York City, U.S.
- Occupation: Actor
- Years active: 1991–2014

Curtis L. McClarin (December 19, 1969 – March 3, 2014) was an American film, television and stage actor. He began all three careers in the beginning of the 1990s, appearing in films such as The Hard Way and Fresh, in the television film Murder Without Motive: The Edmund Perry Story about the death of Edmund Perry, and on Broadway in the Tony Award nominated musical Bring in 'da Noise, Bring in 'da Funk.

== Career ==
A resident of Brooklyn, New York, McClarin appeared in regional theatre productions across the United States.

His other film credits include Brother to Brother (2004), The Occupant and The Happening, and he had guest roles on television series such as The Good Wife, Damages, The Wire, Law & Order: SVU, Nurse Jackie and Oz. He was also the voice of the Grand Theft Auto III video game character, Curtly, even though his character was deleted from the final game, his name is still credited. He narrated the audio book Small Steps by Louis Sachar.

== Death ==
In March 2014, McClarin died in his sleep from a brain aneurysm, age 44.

The season six episode of Nurse Jackie, titled "Love Jungle", and the first episode of the mini series on Adult Swim, Neon Joe, Werewolf Hunter titled "Made Ya Look" are dedicated to his memory.

== Filmography ==
Year	Title	Role	Notes
1991	The Hard Way	Dead Romeos	
1994	Fresh	Darryl	
1996	Ripe	H	
1997	Private Parts	Airline Representative	
2004	Brother to Brother	Black Man on Subway	
2008	The Happening	Construction Crew Member	
2011	The Oranges	Christmas Caroler	
2011	Occupant	Cable Installer	
2014	Every Secret Thing	Principal	
