= Action of 20 October 1778 =

1778 action of the American Revolutionary War

- Part of the Anglo-French War
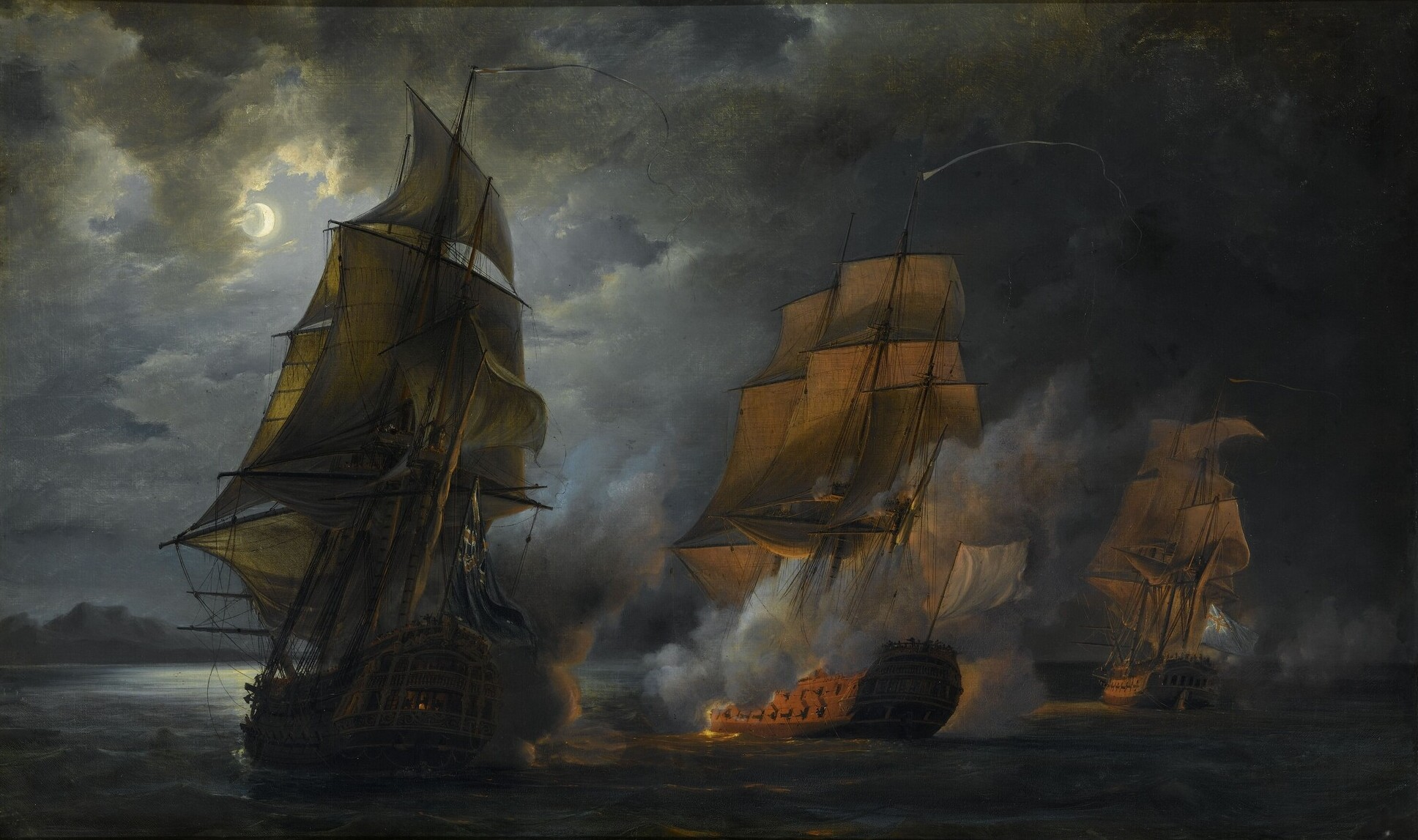
- 1837 painting of the action
Date	20 October 1778
Location	Off Cape Finisterre, Atlantic Ocean
Result	Inconclusive

Belligerents
France	Great Britain

Commanders and leaders
Gaspard de Ligondès (DOW)	Francis Reynolds; James Montagu

Strength
1 ship of the line	1 ship of the line 1 frigate

Casualties and losses
13 killed 20 wounded	4 killed 10 wounded

The action of 20 October 1778 was an inconclusive engagement between the French ship-of-the-line Triton and British ship-of-the-line Jupiter with a frigate Medea that took place off Cape Finisterre in the Bay of Biscay. Darkness separated the combatants before any decisive result was obtained.

== Background ==
The outbreak of the War of the American Independence caused relations between France and Great Britain to deteriorate. After signing a formal treaty with the United States in February 1778, France broke diplomatic ties and declared war on Britain on 16 March 1778.

== Action ==
On 20 October, the French ship-of-the-line Triton under Captain Gaspard de Ligondès, cruising on the Bay of Biscay, fell in with the British ship of the line Jupiter, under Captain Francis Reynolds, and the frigate Medea, under Captain James Montagu. At about 5 PM both sides were at close quarters; Jupiter ranged up on one side of Triton, Medea on the other, about nightfall, and they fired on Triton. Ligondès succeeded in turning the same broadside to both his assailants, putting Medea out of action with a shot below the water line after the first half-hour of the fight, but he was wounded in both arms soon afterward and had to hand over the command to Lieutenant de Roquart. Medea retreated from the action; Triton and Jupiter continued to exchange fire for more two hours, until a squall of wind and rain, and the impenetrable darkness of the night separated the combatants.

Triton had thirteen killed and about twenty wounded, she had fifty shots in her hull or masts, and her sails and rigging were much cut up, but Captain Reynolds reported that she was still able to sail. Jupiter had to sail back into Lisbon for refit with three killed and seven wounded. Medea suffered one killed and three wounded.

== Aftermath ==
Ligondès died of his wound in Brest on 26 January 1779.
