= Killing of Charlie Howard =

1984 killing of a gay man in Bangor, Maine

Charlie Howard
- Born: January 31, 1961; Portsmouth, New Hampshire, U.S.
- Died: July 7, 1984 (aged 23); Bangor, Maine, U.S.
- Cause of death: Drowning
- Known for: Victim of gay-bashing

Charles O. Howard (January 31, 1961 – July 7, 1984) was an American murder victim in Bangor, Maine in 1984. As Howard and his life partner, Roy Ogden, were walking down the street, three teenagers, Shawn I. Mabry, age 16, James (Jim) Francis Baines, age 15, and Daniel Ness, age 17, harassed, assaulted, and murdered Howard for being gay. The youths chased the couple, yelling homophobic epithets, until they caught Howard and threw him over the State Street Bridge into the Kenduskeag Stream, despite his pleas that he could not swim. He drowned, but his partner escaped and pulled a fire alarm. Howard's body was found by rescue workers several hours later.

This event galvanized the Bangor community in ways similar to the killing of Matthew Shepard, although the case never attained the same level of national notoriety. As an adult, Jim Baines later spoke to various groups in Maine about his involvement in the murder and the damage that intolerance can do to people and their community. His story was published as Penitence: A True Story with Edward Armstrong, although Baines received no royalties from the book. The Maine Lesbian/Gay Political Alliance, which later became EqualityMaine, was formed in part as a reaction to Howard's death.

The Bangor City Council and members of the lesbian, gay, bisexual, transgender and queer (LGBTQ) community have erected a monument along the Kenduskeag Stream honoring the memory of Charlie Howard as the victim of a hate crime. The Maine Speakout Project maintains the Charlie Howard Memorial Library in Portland, Maine. The library is open to the public.

== Background ==
Charlie Howard was from Portsmouth, New Hampshire. A young, fair-haired man, Charlie was small boned and suffered from asthma. He was often made fun of as a small child, and was bullied in high school due to his sexual orientation. He did not attend his graduation to spare his family from the taunts he often received. With his poor grades, he knew college was not for him.

Charlie left Portsmouth, New Hampshire and eventually landed in Ellsworth, Maine. When the relationship that he was in ended in January 1984, Charlie left Ellsworth for Bangor, Maine.

In Bangor, Paul Noddin and Scott Hamilton befriended Charlie. Charlie was homeless with no prospects and Scott and Paul welcomed Charlie into their home. After a month, Charlie's opportunities were nil and Scott and Paul convinced him to return home to Portsmouth to live with his mother and stepfather.

Charlie was not home a week when he knew he could not stay. He had a brief relationship that ended quickly. When he called his two friends in Bangor, they realized Charlie was hurting and invited him to come back to Bangor.

Charlie returned - in high spirits and determined. He joined the local supportive Unitarian Church on Union Street as well as the Bangor support group Interweave. Here he made new friends and was accepted for who he was. In thanks for their support, Charlie prepared an Easter dinner for Paul and Scott and decorated their home. Eventually Charlie took an apartment on First Street, near his church, and adopted a kitten.

Charlie lived at a time when most homosexuals were still closeted, but Charlie was "out" and even flamboyant; he wore jewelry and feminine accessories. He was known for singing the song "I Am What I Am" from the musical La Cage aux Folles.

In 1984, many were not tolerant of homosexuals, and victims of gay bashing often did not report incidents. Charlie was often tormented by local high school boys and was asked to leave a local night club when he danced with a man. Charlie was accosted by a woman in a local market one day, who shouted epithets at him such as "You pervert" and "You queer!" Frightened, Charlie quickly left, but as he was leaving, he stopped, turned around, and blew a kiss. After this, Charlie was more wary of strangers. Leaving his apartment one day, he found his pet kitten dead on the doorstep. It had been strangled.

== July 7, 1984 ==
On Saturday, July 7, 1984, Charlie attended a potluck supper at Interweave. Leaving the party about 10 pm with his partner Roy Ogden, Charlie decided to walk to the post office to retrieve his mail. As Charlie and Roy walked up State Street and began to cross the Kenduskeag River Bridge, a car full of high school teenagers began to slow down.

In the car were Shawn Mabry, Jim Baines, Daniel Ness, and two girls. They had been at a party and had left to purchase alcohol with a fake ID that one of the girls had in her possession. Seeing Charlie, the boys got out of the car and decided to give chase. The two girls remained in the car.

Charlie began to run when he recognized the vehicle from an earlier incident. Shouting epithets, the boys gave chase. Charlie fell because of his asthma, and could not catch his breath. Roy ran further down State Street, stopped and observed.

Pouncing on Charlie, the boys began beating and kicking him. Baines shouted to throw Charlie over the bridge and grabbed him by the legs. Baines and Ness grabbed Charlie and they began lifting him. Pleading for his life, Charlie grabbed the rail and begged them not to throw him in the river as he could not swim. Prying his hand loose, they began to pitch him over the rail, with Mabry giving the final push. The boys then returned to the car, which the girls were trying to start. Spying Roy, they threatened him not to tell anyone. Roy then ran for help and pulled the first fire alarm he came to on State Street.

Soon, the sirens could be heard. An immediate search for Charlie began among the concrete retaining walls along the Kenduskeag. At 1 am Charlie's body was found. An autopsy would show he had suffered from a severe asthma attack and drowned.

Returning to the party, the boys bragged about their encounter, calling the bridge the "Chuckahomo Bridge". The next day one of the boys turned himself in after he learned that Charlie had died. The other two boys decided to leave town on a freight train and then thought better of it. Returning home, they were arrested.

== The aftermath ==
The boys were sent to the Hancock County Jail and later released into their parents' custody. They were tried as juveniles. After pleading guilty to manslaughter, they were sentenced on October 1, 1984, to the Maine Youth Center, for a period not to exceed their 21st birthdays. According to the Bangor Daily News, "Baines was released after serving two years, and Mabry was released after 22 months." Charlie Howard was buried in Orchard Grove Cemetery, Kittery, Maine. His grave, previously unmarked, now has a stone.

== Memorials ==
On July 7, 2004, a twentieth anniversary walk was held in memory of Howard.

Twenty-five years later, the Bangor Daily News tried to locate Shawn Mabry, Jim Baines, and Daniel Ness, now middle-aged men, for their views on the murder. They were unable to locate Mabry and Ness at that time, but did find Baines, who was living and working in Bangor. Following his release from the detention center, he spoke regularly about tolerance to local students and even addressed the Maine State Legislature in "support of a bill to ban discrimination based on sexual orientation". In addition, he co-authored the book Penitence with Ed Armstrong in 1994. Baines did not receive any of the profits of the book. That same year, Mabry publicly expressed his regrets about his participation. He stated that he thinks about Charlie Howard every day.

A short distance from the site of Howard's death, a memorial has been erected; engraved on the stone are the words: “May we, the citizens of Bangor, continue to change the world around us until hatred becomes peacemaking and ignorance becomes understanding.” In May 2011, vandals spray-painted graffiti and an anti-gay slur on Charlie Howard's memorial. Family and friends cleaned it up and rededicated it.

July 7, Howard's death date, is dedicated as Diversity Day in Bangor. Each year, a floral wreath is placed into the Kenduskeag as a memorial to Howard, which is a "service [that] re-created the one held after Howard was killed four decades ago, where attendees walked to the site of his death and dropped flowers into the stream below."

In 2021, a stone bench was installed in Portsmouth's Commercial Allery with an inscription of Howard's favorite song “I Am What I Am,” from the musical “La Cage aux Folles…”

July 7, 2024 was the fortieth anniversary of Charlie Howard's death, which was marked by a large memorial gathering involving residents as well as community groups, including the current Unitarian Universalist community in Bangor.

== Legacy in pop culture ==
Charlie Howard's murder inspired a similar scene in Bangor-native Stephen King's 1986 novel It, in which three homophobic teenagers throw a young gay man, Adrian Mellon, over a bridge and into the Kenduskeag, where he was set upon and murdered by the novel's antagonist Pennywise. In the 2019 film adaption It Chapter Two, Canadian actor Xavier Dolan portrayed the character of Adrian Mellon in the opening scene.

The gay poet Mark Doty wrote a poem about the murder called "Charlie Howard's Descent".

The murder is also the inspiration for a novel by Bette Greene titled The Drowning of Stephan Jones.

The line "faggot kicked into the icy river" in lesbian-feminist poet Adrienne Rich's poem "Yom Kippur 1984" is a reference to Charlie Howard.

== See also ==
- History of violence against LGBTQ people in the United States
- Violence against LGBTQ people
