= HMS Duc de la Vauginon =

Cutter of the Royal Navy

History

France
- Name: Duc de la Vauguyon
- Builder: André-François Normand, Honfleur
- Laid down: April 1778
- Launched: April 1779
- Captured: June 1779

Great Britain
- Name: HMS Duc de la Vauginon
- Acquired: June 1779 (by capture)
- Fate: Foundered December 1779

General characteristics
- Type: Cutter
- Tons burthen: 16430/94 (bm)
- Length: 68 ft 1 in (20.75 m) (overall); 51 ft 9 3/4 in (15.8 m) (keel)
- Beam: 24 ft 5 in (7.44 m)
- Depth of hold: 9 ft 7 in (2.92 m)
- Propulsion: Sails
- Sail plan: Schooner
- Armament: Privateer: 14 cannon; British service: 12 × 4-pounder guns

HMS Duc de la Vaguinon (or Duc de la Vaugignon) was the French privateer cutter Duc de la Vauguyon, launched in 1779, that the British captured later that same year. The British took her into the Royal Navy, but she was almost immediately lost; her total career lasted only about nine months.

== Origins ==
Duc de la Vauginon was probably built at Honfleur. She was launched on 20 March 1779. Her first captain was Nicolas Roger, in April. However, Commandant Marin Le Page replaced him. (Note: Demerliac also has an entry showing her as being from Dunkirk.)

== Capture ==
Medea, Captain James Montague, and Countess of Scarborough, Captain Thomas Piercy, shared in the capture, on 17 June 1779, of the French privateers Due de la Vauguyon and Comte de Maurepas. Medea captured Due de la Vauguyon (or Duc de Lavaugnon) of Dunkirk, a cutter of 14 guns and 98 men, after a fight of an hour. The fight cost the French four men killed and ten wounded; Medea had no casualties. The British took her into service as Duc de la Vauginon.}

Duc de la Vauguyon had captured and ransomed a lobster smack sailing from Norway to Britain. The master of the smack informed Montague that the privateer had had a consort. Medea's rigging was too cut up for her to pursue the consort, so Montague sent Piercy after her. Piercy caught up with Compte de Maurepas after a few hours and the privateer struck without resistance. (Note: Demerliac and English records give her name as Comtesse de Maurepas, and her origin as Boulogne. The letter reporting her capture gives her name as above, and her origin as Dunkirk.)

== Fate ==
Between September and November 1779, Duc De La Vauginon underwent coppering and fitting at Deptford. She was commissioned in September under the command of Lieutenant Charles Jordan. He was still in command when she went missing around 15 December 1779 during a storm in the North Sea.
