= Citoyen-class ship of the line =

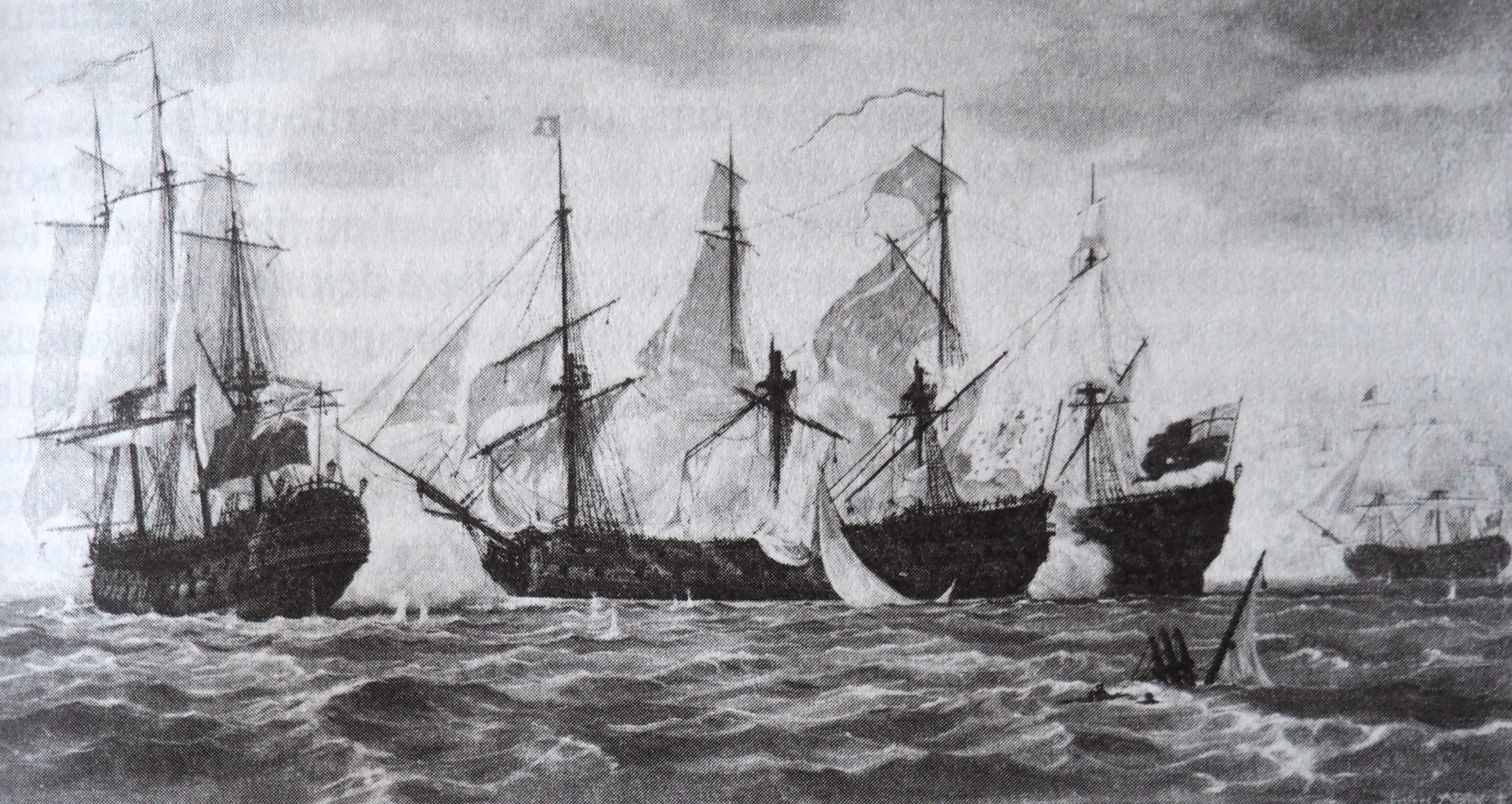
- Conquérant (second from left) at the Battle of Cape Henry

Class overview
- Name: Citoyen
- Builders: Joseph-Louis Ollivier, Brest
- Operators: French Navy
- Completed: 4

General characteristics
- Type: Ship of the line
- Displacement: 3000 tonneaux
- Tons burthen: 1500 port tonneaux
- Length: 169½ French feet (55.06 metres)
- Beam: 43 French feet (13.97 metres)
- Draught: 21 French feet (6.82 metres)
- Depth of hold: 20¾ French feet (6.74 metres)
- Propulsion: Sail
- Complement: 715 men in wartime, 650 men in peacetime; + 6/12 officers
- Armament: 74 guns: Lower battery: 28 × 36-pounders; Upper battery: 30 × 18-pounders; Forecastle and quarterdeck: 16 × 8-pounders
- Armour: Timber
- Notes: Ships in class include: Citoyen, Conquérant, Palmier, Actif

The Citoyen class consisted of four 74-gun ships of the line all built at Brest Naval Dockyard to a design by Joseph-Louis Ollivier. The first ship (Citoyen, originally to have been named Cimeterre) was newly built there from 1761 to 1764, and the other three were rebuilt to her design from earlier ships.

- Citoyen

Built at: Brest
Keel laid: July 1761
Launched: 27 August 1764
Completed: December 1764
Fate: decommissioned in 1783 and taken to pieces in 1792

- Conquérant

Originally built at: Toulon
Ordered: 5 March 1743
Originally launched: 9 March 1746
Rebuilt: from January 1765 at Brest to the draught of the Citoyen, re-launched 29 November 1765 and completed in December 1765
Fate: Condemned in May 1796 but put back into service in March 1798, captured by the British on 2 August 1798 at the Battle of the Nile, broken up in Plymouth in January 1803

- Palmier

Originally built at: Brest
Keel laid: November 1750
Originally launched 21 July 1752
Rebuilt: from 23 May 1766 at Brest to the draught of the Citoyen, re-launched in December 1766 and completed in the same month
Fate: Rebuilt again at Brest in 1776. Abandoned and foundered off Bermuda in the Atlantic Ocean on 24 October 1782

- Actif

Originally built at: Brest (as a 64-gun ship)
Keel laid: 1750
Originally launched: 15 December 1752
Rebuilt at: from April 1767 at Brest to the draught of the Citoyen, re-launched on 5 October 1767 and completed in April 1768
Fate: Rebuilt again at Brest in 1774. Condemned in August 1783, sold 1784

== Sources and references ==
- Demerliac, Alain (1995). La Marine de Louis XV - Nomenclature des navires francais de 1715 à 1774. pp. 39–41. ISBN 2-906381-19-5.
- Winfield, Rif and Roberts, Stephen S., French Warships in the Age of Sail 1626-1786: Design, Construction, Careers and Fates. (Seaforth Publishing, 2017) ISBN 978-1-4738-9351-1.
