= HMS Medea (1778) =

Enterprise-class Royal Navy frigate

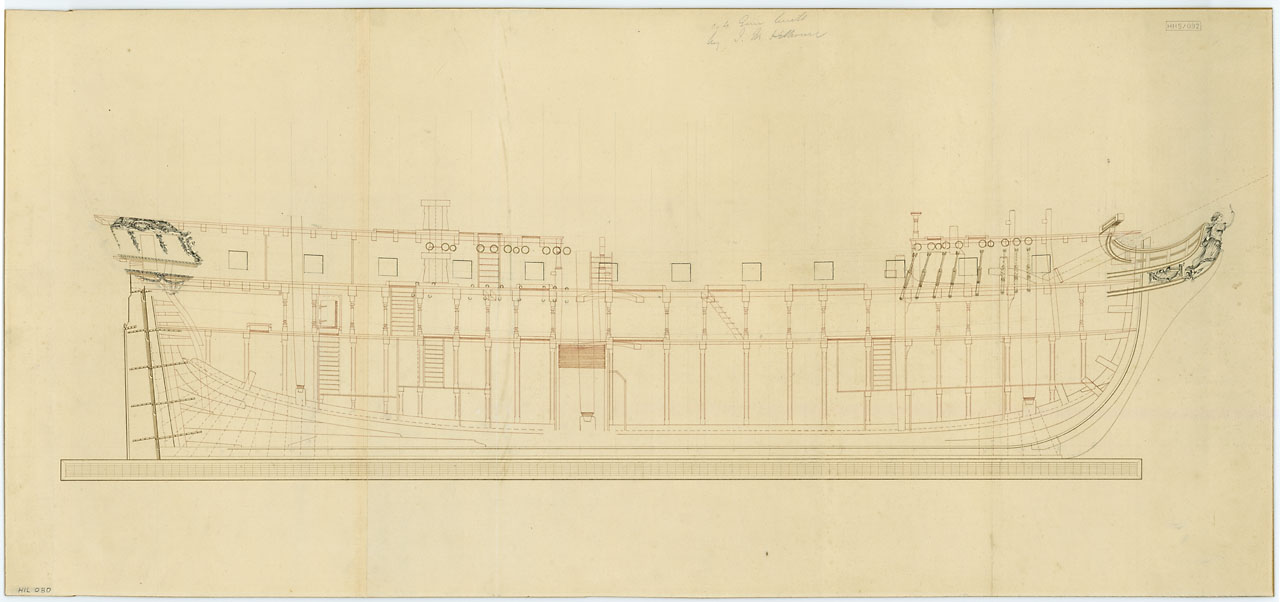
- Plan of Medea dated 1778

History

Great Britain
- Name: HMS Medea
- Ordered: 14 May 1776
- Builder: James Martin Hillhouse, Bristol
- Laid down: June 1776
- Launched: 28 April 1778
- Completed: 15 September 1778 (at Plymouth Dockyard)
- Commissioned: May 1778
- Fate: Sold for scrap in 1805

General characteristics
- Class & type: 28-gun Enterprise-class sixth-rate frigate
- Tons burthen: 604 77/94 (bm)
- Length: 120 ft 9 1/2 in (36.817 m) (overall); 99 ft 4 in (30.28 m) (keel)
- Beam: 33 ft 10 in (10.3 m)
- Depth of hold: 11 ft 0 1/2 in (3.366 m)
- Sail plan: Full-rigged ship
- Complement: 200 officers and men
- Armament: Upper deck: 24 × 9-pounder guns; QD: 4 × 6-pounder guns + 4 × 18-pounder carronades; Fc: 2 × 18-pounder carronades; 12 × swivel guns

HMS Medea was a 28-gun Enterprise-class sixth-rate frigate of the Royal Navy. Medea was first commissioned in May 1778 under the command of Captain William Cornwallis. She was sold for breaking up in 1805.

== Career ==
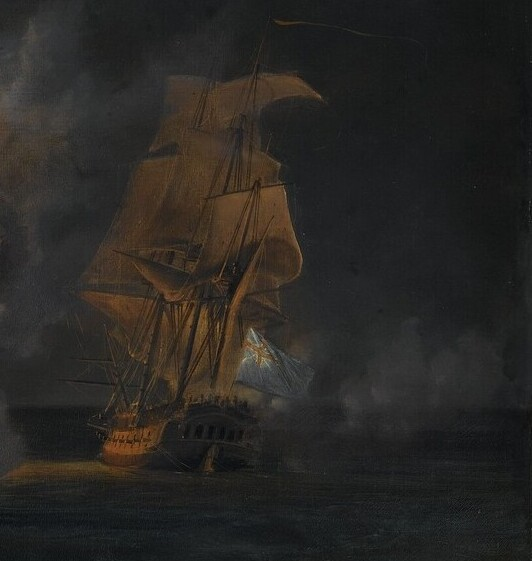
Medea at the action of 20 October 1778

In July 1778, Medea started to cruise in the North Sea and the Channel. Off Cape Finisterre on 20 October 1778, being in company with the ship-of-the-line Jupiter under Captain Francis Reynolds, she met Triton under Captain Comte de Ligondès, but Medea got so badly damaged that she was forced to break off the action with the loss of one man killed and three wounded. She later, with HM hired armed ship Countess of Scarborough, shared in the capture, on 17 June 1779, of the French privateers Compte de Maurepas and Duc de la Vauguyon. Medea captured Duc de la Vauguyon (or Duc de Lavaugnon) of Dunkirk, a cutter of 14 guns and 98 men, after a fight of an hour. The fight cost the French four men killed and ten wounded; Medea had no casualties. The Royal Navy took her into service under the name Duc de la Vauginon or Duc de la Vaugignon.

Duc de la Vauguyon had captured and ransomed a lobster smack sailing from Norway to Britain. The master of the smack informed Captain James Montagu (Royal Navy officer) of Medea that the privateer had had a consort. Medea's rigging was too cut up for her to pursue the consort, so Montague sent Countess of Scarborough, Captain Thomas Piercy, after her. Piercy caught up with Compte de Maurepas, of Dunkirk, after a few hours and the privateer struck without resistance. She was armed with fourteen 4-pounder guns and had a crew of 87 men.

On 5 May 1781 Medea assisted the fifth-rate HMS Roebuck in the capture, off Sandy Hook, of Protector, a 28-gun frigate of the Massachusetts State Navy. The prisoners were taken off to the prison hulk Jersey.

On 7 September 1781 Medea captured Belisarius, "a fast sailing frigate of 26 guns and 147 men, belonging to Salem". Medea captured her off the Delaware River. Amphitrite and Savage shared in the capture. The Royal Navy took her into service as the sixth rate HMS Bellisarius, but then sold her in 1783, after the end of the war.

Medea made a number of other captures in summer 1781. These included the ship Phoenix (1 June), the ship Rover (20 June), the schooner Neptune (30 July; with Amphitrite and General Monk), and the brig Marianne (13 August).

From October 1781 to January 1784 Medea was commanded by Captain Erasmus Gower serving in the final stages of the American War of Independence being fought in India. Sailing in company with HMS Sceptre (1781) 64 guns near the Cape of Good Hope Medea captured a rich French store ship, La Concorde, after a brief engagement. After reaching Madagascar, Gower was forced to use Medea to tow his prize all the way to Madras, taking two months. Medea then came under the command of Vice-Admiral Sir Edward Hughes.

On 15 January 1783 Medea captured the French corvette Chasseur, carrying dispatches that revealed that the French fleet under Admiral Pierre André de Suffren had returned to the Coromandel coast while Vice-Admiral Hughes was still refitting at Bombay. Chasseur had been the British sloop HMS Chaser (1778 ship), captured by the French on 14 February 1782, and was now sent to Bombay under the command of Medea's Lieutenant Thomas Campbell to advise Admiral Hughes.

Ten days later Medea cut out and captured a large Dutch ship – Vrijheid – from Cuddalore road after taking fire from a fort on the beach and the enemy ship. The Honorable East India Company (HEIC) offered Captain Gower a fortune for the hull and furniture of Vrijheid but he refused to sell, intending to have the ship converted to a 64 gun warship in the Royal Navy. Some months later the ship was lost in the surf at Madras while under attack by a French squadron.

When rumours of preliminary peace negotiations in Europe reached India in June 1783, Captain Gower was instructed to remove his guns from Medea and proceed under a flag of truce to Cuddalore to negotiate a cease fire with Marquis de Bussy-Castelnau and Admiral Suffren. Hostilities were soon concluded and it is probable this was the very last military action of the American War of Independence.

Captain Gower then sailed in Medea with dispatches for the Admiralty and, despite being dis-masted near the Azores, Medea returned to Spithead in only four months, where she was paid off in February 1784.
