= Comte de Maurepas (ship) =

Comte de Maurepas was a common name for French vessels in the 18th century. The name comes from that of the French statesman Jean-Frédéric Phélypeaux, Count of Maurepas.

- In 1739, pirates seized the Comte de Maurepas off Cape St Antoine, Cuba.
- HMS Rippon's Prize captured the French ship Conte de Maurepas on 5 May 1745.
- HMS Harwich captured Maria Louisa Magdalena, Messagere, and Comte de Maurepas at some point in 1757 or shortly before. Harwich shared the prize money, by agreement, with HMS Torbay and HMS Rochester.
- In 1757–58 there was a Comte de Maurepas, a snow of 16 guns, which had been highly successful as a privateer. In 1757 she had taken 15 vessels in the North Sea, and three off the Norwegian coast. The 15 vessels she had ransomed for 3,920 guineas. Then in 1759, she and a consort were reported to have taken four vessels off Flamborough Head, as well as John and Mary.
- HMS Monmouth, Captain Henry Harrison, brought into Plymouth on 2 March 1747 a French privateer of 20 carriage guns and eight swivel guns. The privateer was Count de Maurepas and capturing her required a chase of three days.
- A squadron under Captain Joseph Deane in HMS Ruby captured the French armed merchant vessel Comte de Maurepas off Cap-François on 13 October 1778. She was of 500 tons burthen (bm), was armed with eight guns, and had a crew of 32 men under Charles Bailly, master. Rear-Admiral Parker ordered her purchased in 1778, armed her with eighteen 6-pounder guns, and gave her the name Port Royal; she was under the command of Commander Timothy Kelly when the Spanish captured her at Pensacola on 8 May 1781. (Note: A number of sources claim, incorrectly, that HM hired armed ship Countess of Scarborough captured her. Others confuse this Comte de Maurepas with the vessel that Countess of Scarborough captured in June 1779. Accounts also refer to Comte de Maurepas as Comtesse de Maurepas.)
- HM hired armed ship Countess of Scarborough and HMS Medea shared in the capture, on 17 June 1779, of the French privateers Comte de Maurepas and Due de la Vauguyon. Medea captured Due de la Vauguyon (or Duc de Lavaugnon) of Dunkirk, a cutter of 14 guns and 98 men, after a fight of an hour. She had been launched in 1778 and was under the command of Commandante Marin Le Page. The fight cost the French four men killed and ten wounded; Medea had no casualties. Duc de la Vauguyon had captured and ransomed a lobster smack sailing from Norway to Britain. The master of the smack informed Captain James Montague of Medea that the privateer had had a consort. Medea's rigging was too cut up for her to pursue the consort, so Montague sent Piercy after her. Piercy caught up with Comte de Maurepas after a few hours and the privateer struck without resistance. She was armed with fourteen 4-pounder guns and had a crew of 87 men. She was of Boulogne, and under the command of Commandante Joseph Castagnier. (Note: Demerliac, and several British sources, give her name as Comtesse de Maurepas, though the original report of her capture refers to her as Comte de Maurepas of Dunkirk.)
- HMS Southampton captured the French privateer lugger Comte de Maurepas, of Boulogne, on 3 August 1780. The lugger was armed with 12 guns and had a crew of 80 men under the command of Joseph Le Clerk. She was newly built. She had on board Mr. Andrew Stuart, Surgeon's Mate of HMS Speedwell, "as a ransomer." She had suffered shot holes between wind and water and sank shortly thereafter. Southampton shared the head money award with HMS Buffalo, HMS Thetis, and HMS Alarm.
- In 1781 a second Comtesse de Maurepas, of Dunkirk, served as a privateer, also under Commandante Joseph Castagnier. She was armed with 16 cannons and had a crew of 105 men.
