= Kenduskeag Stream =

River in Maine, United States

Coordinates: 44°52′58.8″N 68°50′37.3″W

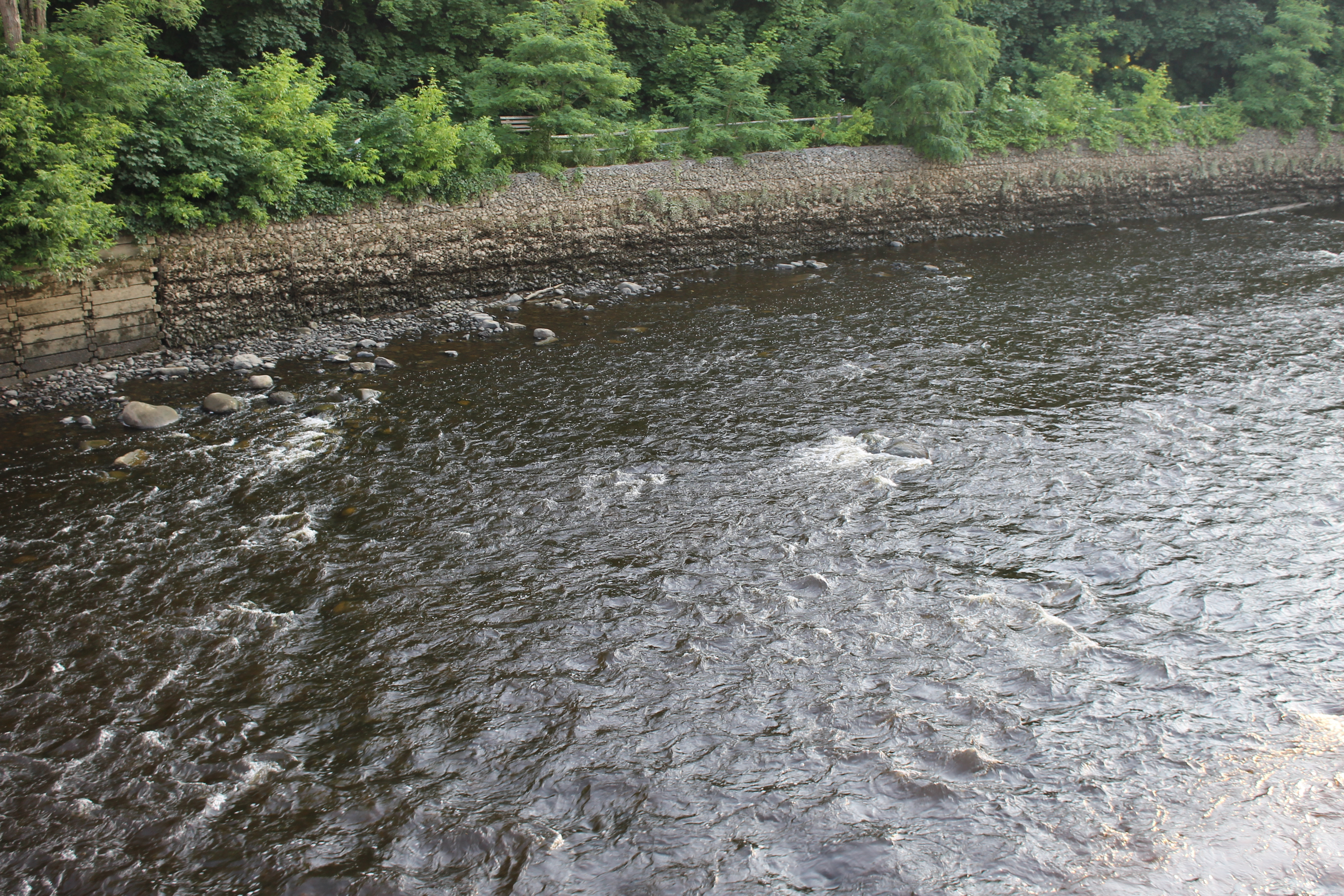
Closeup of the Kenduskeag in Bangor, where it flows into the Penobscot River

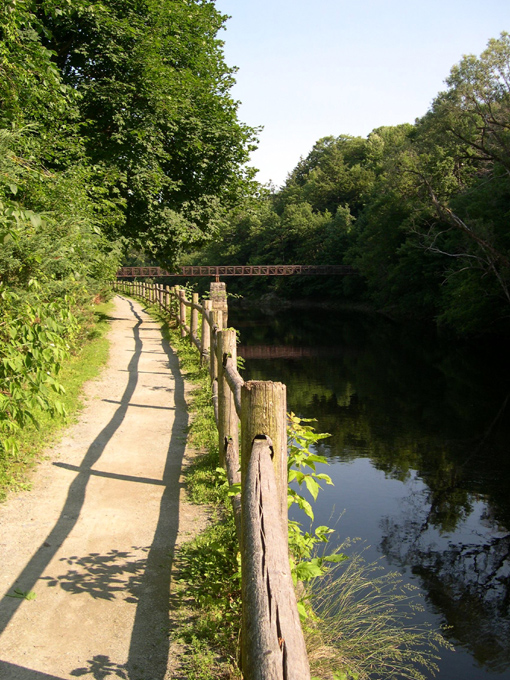
The Kenduskeag Stream at Bangor

Kenduskeag Stream is a 36.2-mile (58.3 km) stream in the U.S. state of Maine. It is a tributary of the Penobscot River. The stream rises at the outlet of Garland Pond in the town of Garland, and flows southeast through Corinth, Kenduskeag, and Glenburn, before it reaches the city of Bangor. Passing through downtown Bangor, the stream drops 100 feet (30 m) in 2 miles (3 km), flowing into the Penobscot between the two downtown bridges across the larger river. Kenduskeag means "eel weir place" in Penobscot.

Kenduskeag Stream plays an important role in the fictional town of Derry, Maine, in the works of Stephen King.

In 1984, Charlie Howard was harassed and assaulted by homophobic teenagers who threw him off the State Bridge into the Kenduskeag Stream. Howard died by drowning.
