= HMS Port Royal (1778) =

Armed Merchant Vessel

HMS Port Royal was the former French armed merchant vessel Comte de Maurepas, which the British captured in 1778. The British armed her with 18 guns and took her into the Royal Navy under her new name. (Note: A number of sources claim, incorrectly, that HM hired armed ship Countess of Scarborough captured her. Others confuse this Comte de Maurepas with the Compte de Maurepas that the Countess of Scarborough captured in June 1779. Accounts also refer to the Comte de Maurepas as the Comtesse de Maurepas.) The Spanish captured her at the Siege of Pensacola in 1781.

== Capture ==
On 13 October 1778, the squadron under Captain Joseph Deane in HMS Ruby captured Comte de Maurepas off Cap-François. (Note: That same day the squadron captured the merchant vessel Astrėe, which the Royal Navy took into service as the sixth-rate frigate Hinchinbrook, and which Captain Horatio Nelson would briefly command.) Comte de Maurepas was of 500 tons burthen (bm), was armed with eight guns, and had a crew of 32 men under Charles Bailly, master. She had been carrying a cargo of bricks and bale goods from Nantes.

Rear-Admiral Parker ordered her purchase. She was purchased on 8 December at a cost of £4,900. The British re-measured her as 463 tons (bm), armed her with eighteen 6-pounder guns and a dozen swivel guns; as Port Royal, she was commissioned under Commander Michael John Everitt on 1 January 1779 with a complement of 125 men. (Note: Everitt's transfer to Port Royal from Badger freed up a command position for Lieutenant Horatio Nelson, his first. Nelson had been first lieutenant of Bristol.)

By the start of June 1779, Everitt had been succeeded in charge of Port Royal by Commander John Cowling, who remained in command until December 1779. Everitt was transferred as commander (acting captain) to HMS Ruby, a 64-gun third rate ship of the line, as a replacement for Captain Joseph Deane, who was unwell. Deane died on 12 January 1780. On 2 June, Ruby was in company with Aeolus and the sloop Jamaica when they encountered the French 36-gun frigate Prudente. The British gave chase, during which a chance shot from Prudente's stern guns killed Everitt and a sailor. The British captured Prudente, which they took into service under her existing name.

== Fate ==
Port Royal, came under the command of Commander Timothy Kelly on 13 January 1780.

In 1781, he sailed to Pensacola to assist the British forces there, which were under siege. The Siege of Pensacola lasted from 9 March 1781 to 8 May. On 10 March, the Spaniards captured a boat and nine men from Port Royal who had gone foraging to Rose Island. On 23 March, Kelly was ordered to bring his crew ashore to help man the shore defenses. The plan was to destroy the sloop if necessary, but in the interim, the British put some of their Spanish prisoners aboard to keep them out of the hands of Britain's Indian allies. Unfortunately, on 1 April, the Spanish sent in boats that captured Port Royal without resistance. On 4 May, one of Port Royal's crew was badly wounded by a cannon ball; he later died. Another of the crew was killed two days later.

The last Spanish assault on 8 May cost the Port Royal its Midshipman, John Blair, 12 seaman killed, and five seamen wounded. Three seamen took the opportunity to desert. All casualties occurred in the advanced redoubt. The British formally capitulated on 10 May 1781 and the Spanish seized Fort George and, with it, western Florida.

In his report, Major-General John Campbell, the British commander, singled out Lieutenant William Hargood, who had joined Port Royal in January 1780, for his service in command of the Royal Navy redoubt at Fort George. The Spanish took their British prisoners to Havana, and then returned them to the British in New York in an exchange for Spanish prisoners of war.
