= French ship Fendant (1776) =

Ship of the line of the French Navy

History

France
- Name: Fendant
- Builder: Rochefort
- Laid down: May 1772
- Launched: September 1776
- Commissioned: 20 May 1777
- Out of service: 1783
- Fate: Wrecked 1783

General characteristics
- Displacement: 2884 tonneaux
- Tons burthen: 1500 port tonneaux
- Length: 53.3 m (174 ft 10 in)
- Beam: 14.3 m (46 ft 11 in)
- Draught: 7.3 m (23 ft 11 in)
- Armament: 74 guns

Fendant was a 74-gun ship of the line of the French Navy. Designed by Antoine Groignard, she was the first ship to be built under a roof cover. She served in Suffren's campaign against the British in India during the American Revolutionary War, and was wrecked in 1783 near Pondicherry.

== Career ==
Started in May 1772 on a design by Antoine Groignard, construction of Fendant proceeded slowly, due to shortages in timber in Rochefort. In November 1771, a permanent roof was erected over her stacks, as well as that of Réfléchi, making the first ships to be completed in a covered dock.

Fendant was commissioned in December 1776 under Captain Louis de Rigaud de Vaudreuil. She took part in the Battle of Ushant, where she sustained five killed and 27 wounded.

Fendant served in the Anglo-French War, notably taking part in the Battle of Grenada. In July 1781, she fought in the Invasion of Minorca before being sent to the Indian Ocean in November to reinforce Suffren's squadron. Arrived there in March 1782, Fendant took part in the Battle of Cuddalore on 20 June 1783 as the flagship of Antoine de Thomassin de Peynier, Captain of the Fleet under Read-Admiral Suffren, with Armand de Saint-Félix as flag captain.

Later the year, Fendant ran aground near Pondicherry and became a total loss.

== Legacy ==
A model of Fendant is on display at the Musée de la Marine in Rochefort.
