= French ship Bizarre (1751) =

French 64-gun ship of the line launched in 1751

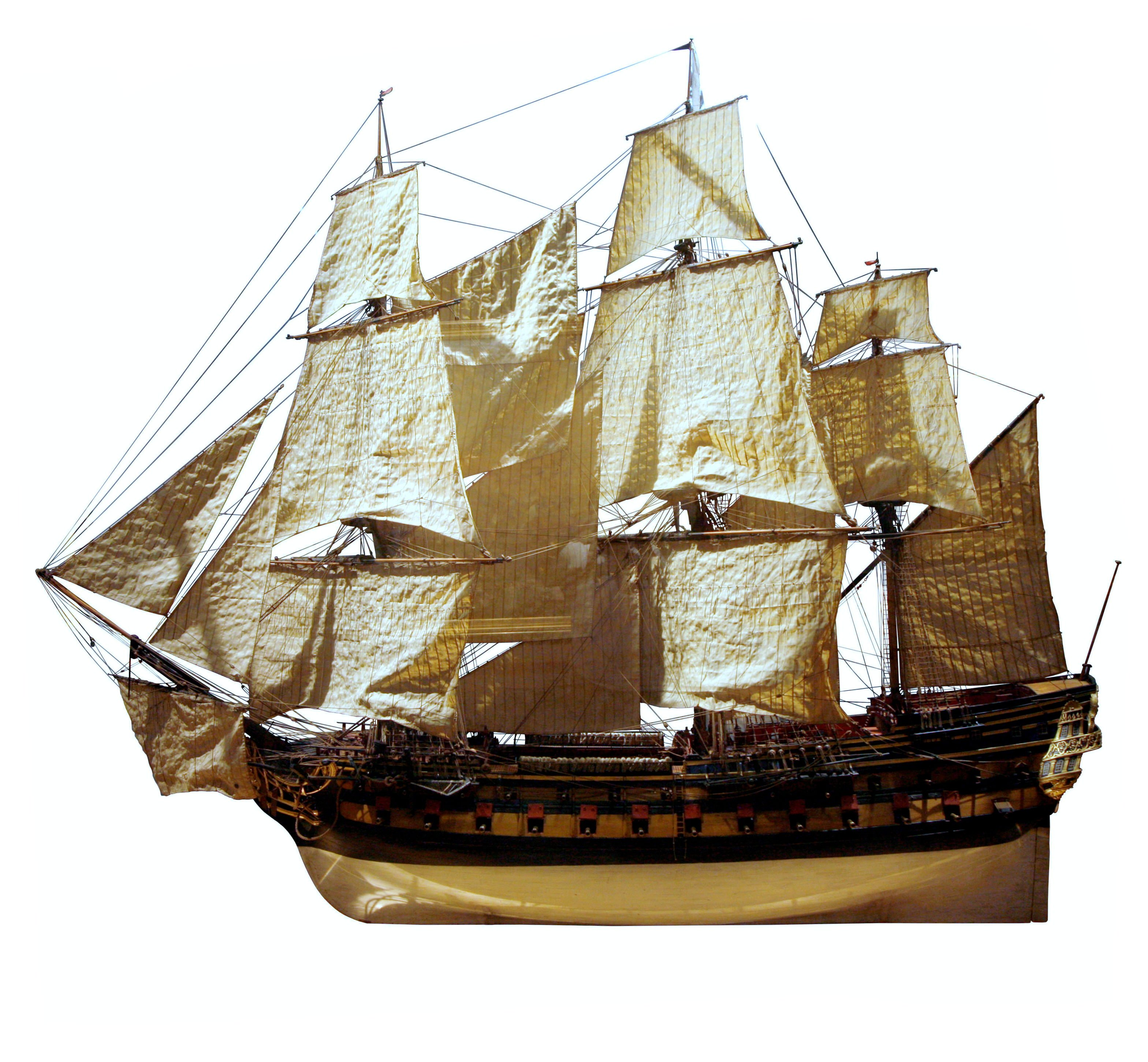
- Model of a 64-gun ship from the 1770s of the same type as the Bizarre

History

France
- Name: Bizarre
- Builder: Brest
- Laid down: December 1749
- Launched: September 1751
- In service: March 1753
- Fate: Wrecked 4 October 1782

General characteristics
- Displacement: 2200 tonneaux
- Tons burthen: 1100 port tonneaux
- Length: 49.7 metres
- Beam: 13.3 metres
- Draught: 6.3 metres
- Propulsion: Sails
- Sail plan: Full-rigged ship
- Armament: 64 guns

Bizarre was a 64-gun ship of the line of the French Navy. She was present at two major battles, and was wrecked in 1782.

== Career ==
Built on a design by François Coulomb, Bizarre entered service in 1753. She took part in the Seven Years' War, notably attacking an English convoy off Ireland on 10 October 1758, along with the 28-gun corvette Mignonne. Together they captured 44 merchantmen as well as the convoy's escort HMS Winchelsea.

In 1777, she was under Louis Augustin de Monteclerc.

She was activated for the American Revolutionary War under Captain La Landelle-Roscanvec and appointed to Suffren's squadron in the Indian Ocean. She was present at the Battle of Negapatam in 1782, although she did not take part in the action. She was also at the Battle of Trincomalee.

After the Battle of Trincomalee, La Landelle-Roscanvec requested to be relieved and left the squadron, embarking on Pulvérisateur on 3 September 1782, bound for Isle de France. Suffren replaced him with Lieutenant Tréhouret de Pennelé.

== Fate ==
On 4 October 1782, she ran aground near Cuddalore and became a total loss. Her commanding officer, Lieutenant Tréhouret de Pennelé, was dismissed from the Navy.

== Citations ==
=== Bibliography ===
- Contenson, Ludovic (1934). La Société des Cincinnati de France et la guerre d'Amérique (1778-1783). Paris: éditions Auguste Picard. OCLC 7842336.
- Cunat, Charles (1852). Histoire du Bailli de Suffren. Rennes: A. Marteville et Lefas.
- Lacour-Gayet, Georges (1910). La marine militaire de la France sous le règne de Louis XVI. Paris: Honoré Champion.
- Roche, Jean-Michel (2005). Dictionnaire des bâtiments de la flotte de guerre française de Colbert à nos jours 1 1671 - 1870. p. 28. ISBN 978-2-9525917-0-6. OCLC 165892922.
