= François-Louis de Brach =

French Navy officer

- Military career
- Allegiance: France
- Branch: Navy
- Rank: Lieutenant-colonel
- Commands: Magnifique
- Conflicts: War of American Independence

François-Louis de Brach was a French Navy officer. He notably served during the War of American Independence.

== Biography ==
Brach joined the Navy as a Garde-Marine on 24 May 1757. He was promoted to lieutenant on 14 February 1778.

Brach captained the 74-gun Magnifique at the Battle of Ushant on 27 July 1778. After the battle, he was one of the captains whom Orvilliers praised for their conduct.

In the evening of 9 June 1779, Brach departed Martinique, leading a division comprising the 64-gun Vengeur, the 50-gun Sagittaire, and the frigates Chimère and Aimable, as a diversion to distract the British from another division, under Du Rumain, tasked with the capture of Saint Vincent.

Brach captained Magnifique at the Battle of Grenada on 6 July 1779, and at the Battle of Martinique on 17 April 1780.

He was promoted to lieutenant-colonel on 15 September 1782.
