= French ship Roland (1771) =

Ship of the line of the French Navy

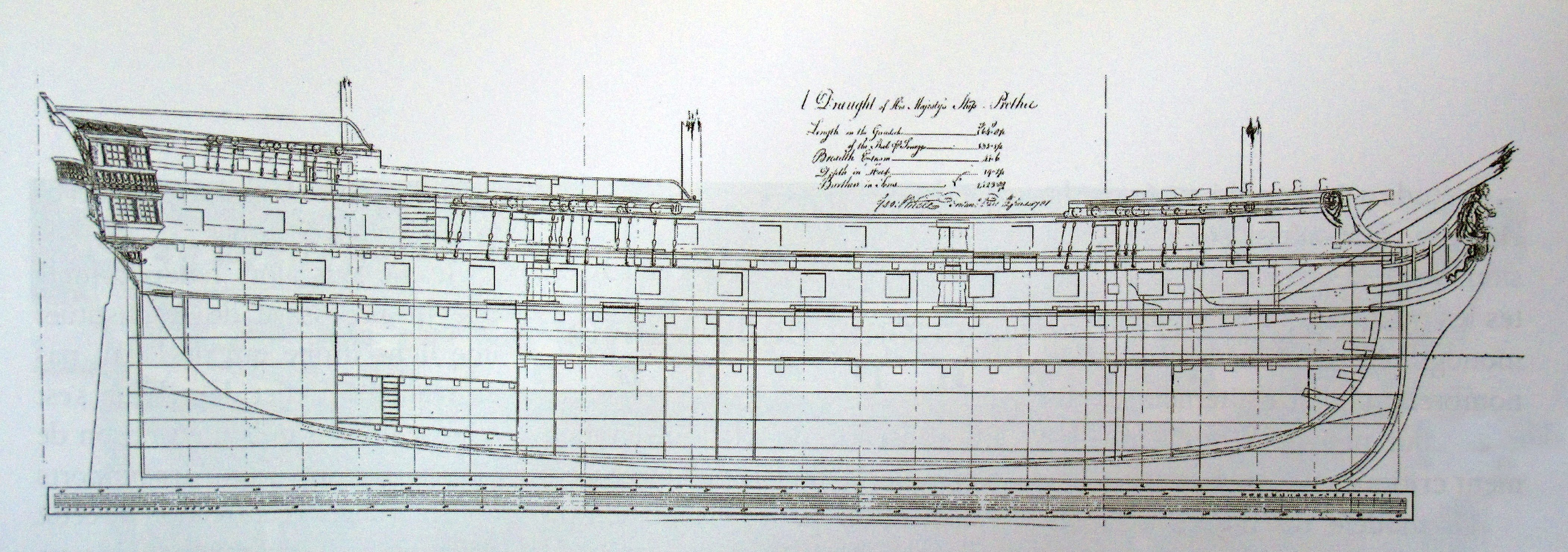
- Plans of the sister-ship Protée

History

France
- Name: Roland
- Ordered: 29 January 1770
- Builder: Brest
- Laid down: 22 January 1770
- Launched: 14 February 1771
- Commissioned: September 1771
- Decommissioned: 28 February 1779
- Fate: Destroyed by fire 28 February 1779

General characteristics
- Class & type: Artésien-class ship of the line
- Displacement: 2084 tonneaux
- Tons burthen: 1200 port tonneaux
- Length: 50.2 metres
- Beam: 13.2 metres
- Depth of hold: 6.4 metres
- Propulsion: Sails
- Sail plan: Full-rigged ship
- Armament: 26 × 24-pounder long guns; 28 × 12-pounder long guns; 10 × 6-pounder long guns

Roland was an Artésien-class 64-gun ship of the line of the French Navy, launched in 1771.

== Career ==
From 1773 to 1775, Roland was the flagship of the Second voyage of Kerguelen. After it returned, its leader, Yves-Joseph de Kerguelen-Trémarec, was court-martialled in Brest on 15 May 1775 by a council of war presided over by Vice-Admiral Anne Antoine, Comte d'Aché for transporting 200 slaves on Roland from Madagascar to sell in French colonies in defiance of Louis XV, who had issued regulations ordering French Navy officers not to trade in slaves. At the court-martial, his defence lawyer minimised Kerguelen's slave-trading activities by stating that it was only "Eight or nine negroes that the pilot’s assistant bought on Kerguelen’s behalf". Although several other naval officers, many of whom were stationed at Rochefort, had traded in slaves, he was found guilty on 25 May 1776 and sentenced to six years imprisonment. Roland took part in the Battle of Ushant on 27 July 1778 under Gilart de Larchantel.

== Fate ==
Roland was destroyed in an accidental fire in Brest on 22 February 1779, along with the nearby frigate Zéphyr.
