= French ship Actif (1767) =

Ship of the line of the French Navy

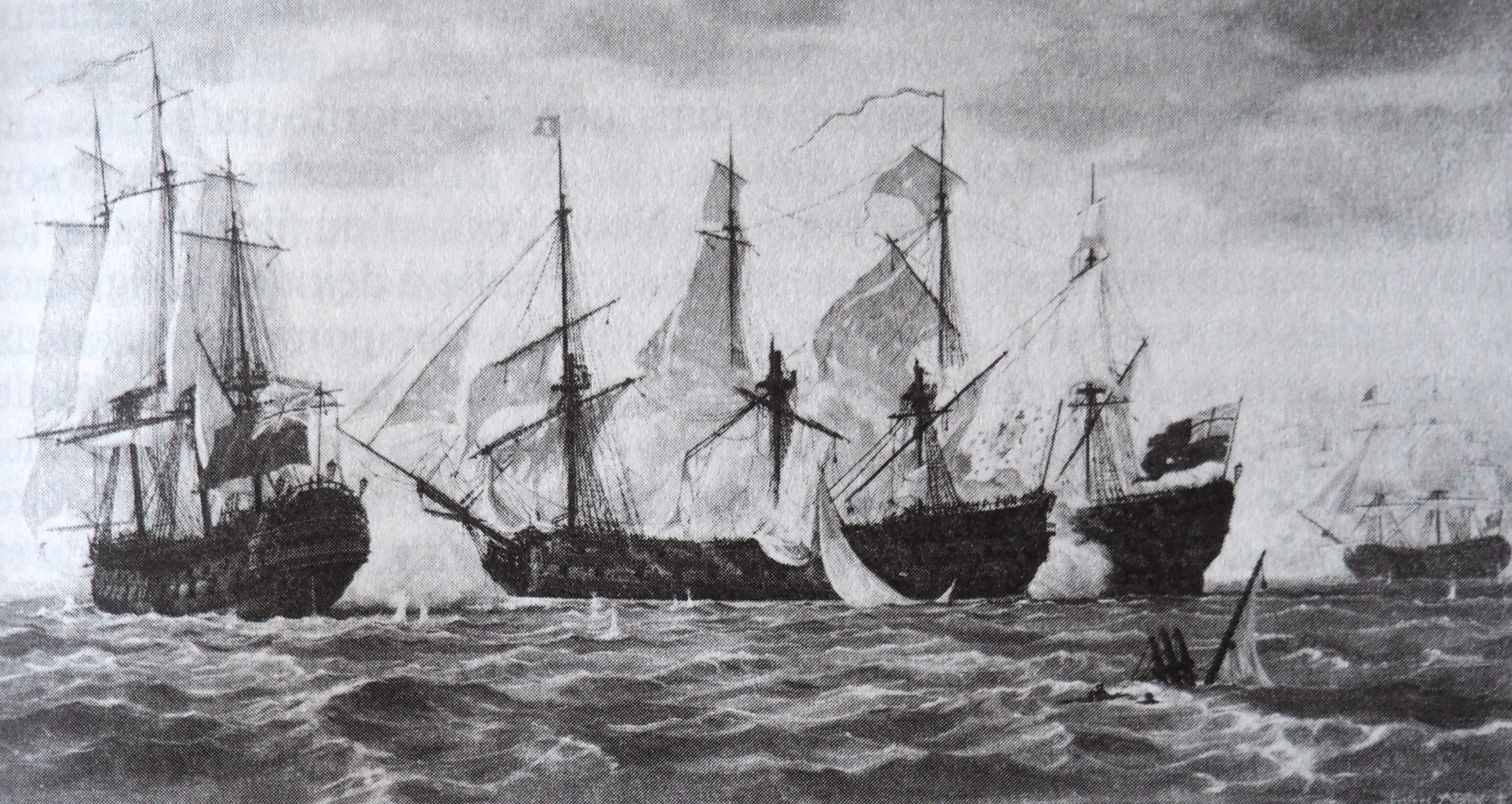
- Conquérant (second from left), Actif's sister ship, at the Battle of Cape Henry

History

France
- Name: Actif
- Namesake: "Active"
- Ordered: 5 March 1743
- Builder: Brest
- Laid down: April 1767
- Launched: 5 October 1767
- Decommissioned: 1783
- In service: April 1768
- Fate: Sold 1784 for breaking up

General characteristics
- Class & type: Citoyen-class ship of the line
- Displacement: 3000 tonneaux
- Tons burthen: 1500 port tonneaux
- Length: 55.1 m (180 ft 9 in)
- Beam: 14.1 m (46 ft 3 in)
- Draught: 6.8 m (22 ft 4 in)
- Propulsion: Sail
- Armament: 74 guns: Lower battery: 28 × 36-pounders; Upper battery: 30 × 18-pounders; Forecastle and quarterdeck: 16 × 8-pounders

Actif was Citoyen-class 74-gun ship of the line of the French Navy.

== Career ==
Actif was built partly with timber recycled from Actif (1752), a 64-gun ship.

She took part in the Battle of Ushant on 27 July 1778 under Estienne d'Orves. The year after, she was in the Channel as part of Orvilliers's squadron, but she suffered an epidemic that disabled 222 of her crew, and was forced to return to Brest.

In 1780, she was under La Cardonnie, and cruised off Cadiz and Saint-Vincent. She captured the British Hercule, Wright, master, off Saint-Vincent.

On 14 and 15 April 1781, as she was cruising under Brun de Boades, Actif fought an action against the 64-gun HMS Nonsuch.

In February 1782, she cruised off England under Allart de Suville.

== Fate ==
Actif was sold in 1784 for breaking up.
