= French frigate Hermione (1779) =

1779 Concorde-class frigate

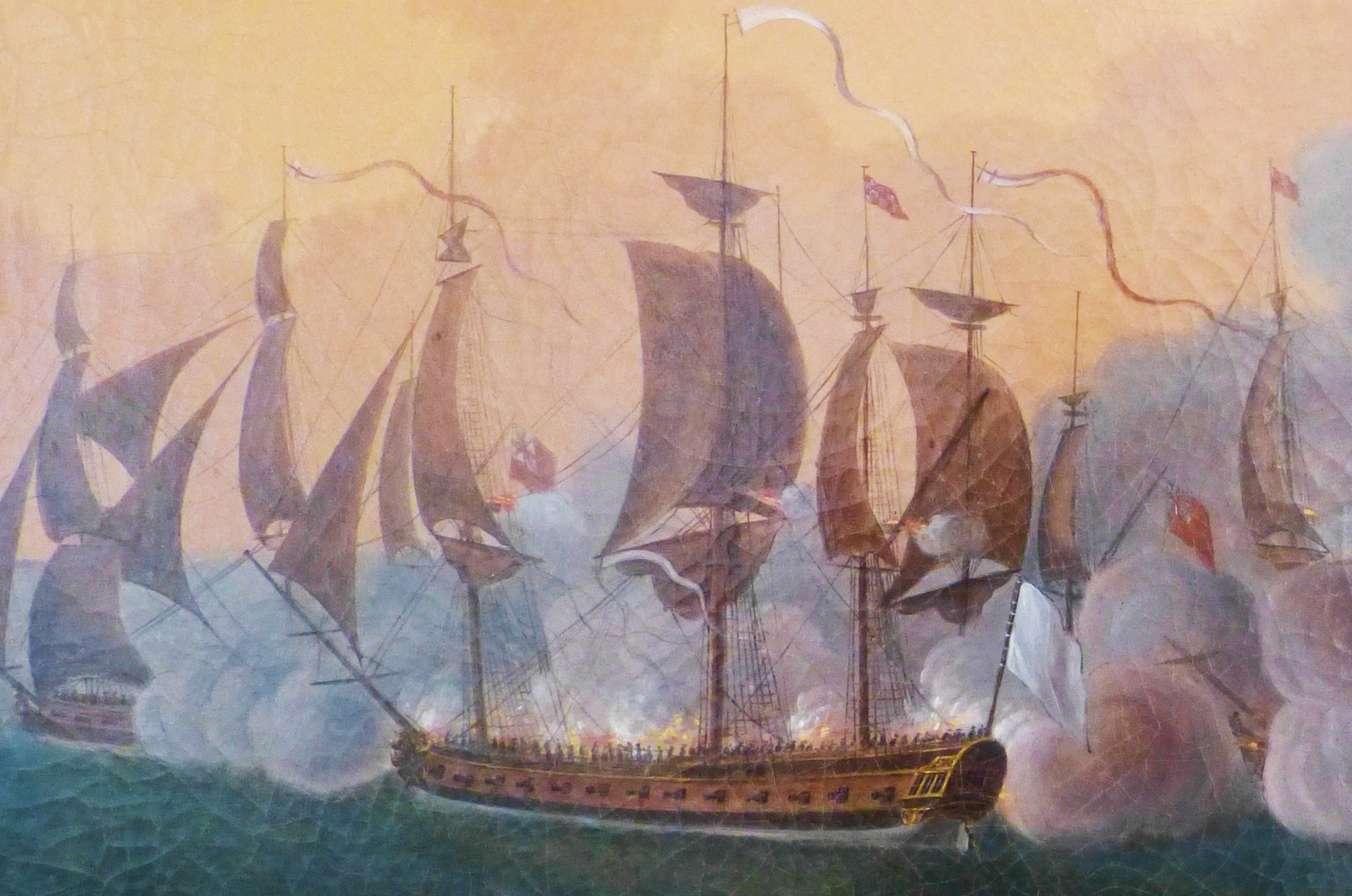
- Hermione in the Naval battle of Louisbourg, by Rossel de Cercy

History

France
- Name: Hermione
- Builder: Rochefort
- Laid down: December 1778
- Launched: 28 April 1779
- Commissioned: 11 May 1779
- In service: June 1779
- Fate: Ran aground and wrecked due to a navigation error of her pilot at Le Croisic on 20 September 1793

General characteristics
- Class & type: Concorde-class 12-pounder frigate
- Displacement: 1,100 tonneaux
- Tons burthen: 550 port tonneaux
- Length: 44.2 m (145 ft)
- Beam: 11.24 m (36.9 ft)
- Draught: 5.78 m (19.0 ft)
- Speed: 9 knots close-hauled; 13 knots broad reach; 11 knots running (Note: On 2 September 1779, Latouche stated that he had reached 15 knots during a gale.)
- Complement: 6 officers; 10 guards; 292 seamen
- Armament: 32 guns: 26 × 12-pounder long guns; 6 6-pounder long guns

Hermione was a 32-gun Concorde-class frigate of the French Navy. Designed for speed, she was one of the first ships of the French Navy to receive a copper sheathing. At the beginning of the Anglo-French War of 1778, she patrolled in the Bay of Biscay, escorting convoys and chasing privateers. She became famous when she ferried General La Fayette to the United States in 1780 in support of the rebels in the American Revolutionary War. She took an incidental role in the Battle of Cape Henry on 16 March 1781, and a major one in the action of 21 July 1781.

Hermione grounded and was wrecked in 1793. In 1997, construction of a replica ship started in Rochefort, Charente-Maritime, France; the new ship is likewise named Hermione.

== Construction ==
Construction of Hermione started in December 1778 at Rochefort, under Chevillard brothers. She was launched on 28 April 1779, and commissioned on 11 May, with 5 month worth of food and 66 barrels of fresh water, under Lieutenant Latouche-Tréville Shortage of adequate weapons forced Latouche to install 20 older 12-pounder long guns, heavier and longer than originally intended.

Latouche chose former mates from his old ship, the 12-gun corvette Rossignol. Duquesne, formerly second officer on Rossignol, was promoted to first officer on Hermione (Orléans, the first officer of Rossignol, was promoted to the command of that corvette). He also brought two auxiliary officers, Boudet and Villemarets, and volunteer Bart, also veterans from Rossignol. In addition came three new auxiliary officers, Lieutenants de Frégate Chicon de Saint-Bris, Mullon, and Gourg.

On 18 May 1779, Hermione departed Rochefort and sailed down the river Charente, arriving at Ile d'Aix on 21. She conducted her trials, easily distancing Rossignol and, later favourably comparing with the frigates Courageuse and Médée.

== Career ==
=== Operations in the Bay of Biscay ===
Hermione made her first operational sortie in late May. On 29, near Cape Ortegal, she captured the British privateer Defiance, with 18 guns and 70 men. The next day, she captured another privateer, Lady's Resolution, of 18 guns and 119 men. Hermione returned to Rochefort in early June.

On 17 June 1779, Hermione departed Rochefort as part of a division also comprising Courageuse, under La Rigaudière, and Médée. The division encountered the 48-gun USS Bonhomme Richard and three smaller units that sailed with her. Both division mistook the others of an enemy, and avoided contact.

In late July, Hermione and Courageuse were on convoy escort duty. On 28 August, after a 40-shot exchange, Hermione captured the privateer Hawker, or Hawck, Stocker, master, of 14 guns and 61 men. Hawck has departed Weymouth on 12 August and had not caught anything. From her captain, Latouche obtained the codes of British privateers. Latouche called A Coruña, where he sold Hawck for 30,000 Livres and completed his crew. Hermione returned to Brest on 18 September.

On 2 October, Hermione departed to patrol off Ireland. On 6, off Ushant, she captured the merchant brig Anna, returning from Jamaica with rhum, sugar and wood. On 21, the sloop Marie, returning from Lisbon with fruits and wine. And the next day, the brig Pelican, which was bringing salt from Portugal to Newfoundland. On 27, Hermione encountered a 26-gun privateer, which she chased for 36 hours. She had to abandon her pursuit when two British frigates and a cutter joined her quarry, and flee herself.

From November to 28 December, Hermione underwent a refit to receive a copper sheathing, becoming only the third ship of the French Navy to be so upgraded. (Note: After Gentille and Amazone in 1778.) She was recommissioned in early January 1780. She departed Rochefort on 24 and arrived in the Bay of Biscay on 27. She sustained damage to her rigging in a gale on 13 February, but continued her mission, escorting a convoy with Galathée. She returned to Rochefort on 19 February, and Latouche reported that the coppering had improved her nautical qualities.

=== Operations off America ===
On 24 late February 1780, Latouche was tasked with ferrying General La Fayette to America. La Fayette was to return as an emissary of Louis XVI to George Washington, and announce that France was sending a 6-ship squadron and 5,000 soldiers in support of the independence of the Thirteen Colonies. Hermione was also to carry 4,000 uniforms for the Continental Army, but these could not be found by the time of departure.

General La Fayette embarked at Rochefort on 10 March 1780. Hermione sailed to the open sea, but in the night of 13, a gale ruptured the spar of her mainsail and she had to anchor off Ile d'Aix to effect repairs. She sailed again on 20, evading any encounter en route, and arrived at Boston on 27 April. Official celebration ensued, complete with gun salutes to political and military authorities of France and of the Thirteen Colonies.

On 2 May, Latouche offered to patrol the Bay of Boston and secure it against British privateers and frigates, which the authorities of Massachusetts approved on the next day. On 14, Hermione set sail and cruised to the North, trying to lure smaller British warships, but she did not catch anything and on 21 May, she returned to Rhode Island.

On 28 May, Latouche received instructions from Ambassador La Luzerne to patrol the mouth of the Delaware River from 26 June. Latouche decided to take advantage of the free time this left him to cruise off New York and intercept British communications. On 2 June, Hermione captured the 100-ton brigantine Thomas, laden with butter, candles and soap. On 6, she intercepted Rewrery, laden with salt. Latouche sent them both to Providence.

The next morning, Hermione detected a Sloop-of-war, a schooner, a snow and a frigate. As Hermione closed in, the snow and the frigate slowed down to cover the retreat of the sloop and the schooner. The frigate was the 32-gun HMS Iris, under James Hawker. Hermione and Iris hoisted their flags, and the action of 7 June 1780 ensued. After 90 minutes of gunnery and musketry exchange, the ships disengaged. Hermione sustained significant damage to her sails, and had 10 killed and 37 wounded.

After the battle, Hermione returned to Newport, where she arrived on 8. She disembarked her wounded, effected repairs, and returned to the sea on 15. on 4 July, she fired a 13-gun salute for Independence Day.

On 11 June 1780, the French fleet of the Expédition Particulière, Admiral Ternay started arriving, first with 32-gun frigate Amazone, under Captain Lapérouse, followed by 36 transports, 7 ships of the line (Note: the 80-gun Duc de Bourgogne, under Ternay d'Arsac (admiral) and Médine (flag captain); the 74-gun Neptune, under Sochet Des Touches, and Conquérant, under La Grandière; and the 64-gun Provence under Lombard, Ardent under Bernard de Marigny, Jason under La Clocheterie and Éveillé under Le Gardeur de Tilly) and 3 other frigates. (Note: Surveillante under Villeneuve Cillart, Amazone under La Pérouse, and Bellone) From then on, Hermione was attached to the Ternay's squadron as part of a frigate division under Captain Jean-Marie de Villeneuve Cillart, with his flag on Surveillante, and also comprising Amazone. The division attempted a sortie on 21, but immediately detected a British fleet blockading Newport and returned to harbour. Until October, the frigates remained at anchor and the crew helped reinforce coastal defences.

On 28 October 1780, Hermione and Surveillante departed Newport, escorting Amazone which was bound for France. The next day, off New York, they captured the merchantman Phillipe, with 28 men and 16 4-pounders, laden with oranges, wine and candied fruit.

Ternay died on 15 December 1780, and Captain Sochet Des Touches replaced him as commander of the French squadron. He decided to prepare a sortie against the British blockade. After preparations, the squadron set sail on 8 March 1781, with Hermione as vanguard. In the morning of 16, Hermione detected a strange sail. Chasing the unknown ship let her to detect the entire British squadron. Des Touches formed his battle line and engaged, leading to the Battle of Cape Henry. After the battle, Hermione returned to reconnaissance duty, capturing the merchantman Union on 19, until 22 when Des Touches detached her to bring news of the battle to the US Congress. Hermione arrived near Philadelphia on 25.

After transmitting despatches to La Luzerne, Latouche retrieved 30 French sailors who had been loaned to USS Ariel. He also loaded a cargo of flour for the French squadron and sailed to Newport. On 14 April 1781, a longboat sank while offloading the flour, killing 12 sailors. Hermione then returned to Philadelphia for a diplomatic mission. On 4 May, a 100-seat State dinner was held aboard for the members of the US Congress, the State Council of Pennsylvania, and various city officials.

On 18 May, As the Americans having returned Ariel to France, she and Hermione sailed to Newport, again with a cargo of food for the French squadron.

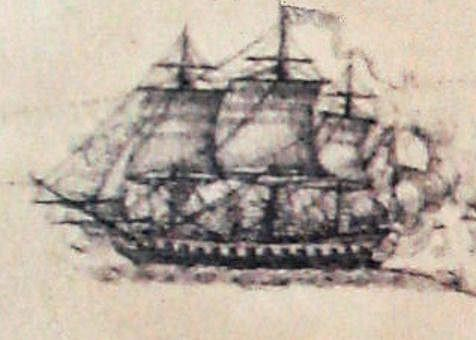
Hermione in action at the Naval battle of Louisbourg, 21 July 1781

From June 1781, Hermione formed a frigate division under Lapérouse, who had his flag on Astrée, tasked with commerce raiding. The frigates left Boston on 23. They captured the 18-gun corvette Thorn on 12 July, and Hermione chased HMS Hind, which escaped into St. George's Bay. On 17 Hermione and Astrée captured the 12-gun merchantman Friendship; the next day, the 8-gun merchantman Phoenix; and on 19, the merchantman Lockard Ross. On 21 July 1781, Hermione and Astrée encountered a British convoy and engaged, leading to the Naval battle of Louisbourg where they captured the 14-gun corvette Jack.

When the action of 2 September 1781 unfolded close to Boston, Sagittaire, Astrée and Hermione scrambled in an attempt to support Magicienne, but they failed to arrive on time, and Chatham could escape with her prize.

On 10, Hermione departed Boston, carrying 3 tonnes of gunpowder for the upcoming Siege of Yorktown. Arrived on 29, Hermione was immediately tasked with logistic duties for the fleet, and in the following days she transported cattle from Lynhaven, along with Iris, Richemond, Diligente and Loyaliste. From 20 Hermione returned to the frigate screen of the French squadron until De Grasse left in early September. She remained off Boston, along with Diligente and Romulus, ferrying artillery and supplies for the Army, and escorting convoys. On 2 February 1782, Hermione departed for France, carrying Antoine Charles du Houx de Vioménil. She arrived at Ile d'Aix on 25.

=== Indian Ocean ===
After the end of the American Revolutionary War, Hermione returned to France in February 1782. She then formed part of a squadron sent to India to help Suffren against the British. She arrived at Isle de France on 14 July 1783, under Du Pérou, but by then a cease-fire was already in force.

With the Peace of Paris in 1783, the mission was cancelled and Hermione returned to Rochefort in April 1784.

=== War of the First Coalition ===
When the War of the First Coalition broke out on 20 April 1792, and Hermione returned to active duty, under Captain Martin. From 7 May 1793, she escorted convoys between Bayonne and Brest. In September 1793, she was appointed to escort a convoy between the mouth of the Loire river and the roadsteads of Brest. On 20 September 1793, around 1830, she ran aground off Le Croisic.

== Fate ==
Aground off Le Croisic, Hermione suffered heavy hull leaking and proved impossible to refloat in the descending tide. Her crew threw 12 guns and anchors overboard to stabilise her. The rising sea lifted Hermione for a while, but she was so damaged that pumping water proved impossible, and she settled on the bottom, where her hull started to disintegrate. At 10am the next morning, Martin evacuated his crew in several fishing boats that had come to the rescue, saving as much equipment as possible, and was last to leave the frigate.

The court-martial consecutive to the wreck found her pilot, Guillaume Guillemin du Conquet, responsible for her loss; her commanding officer, Captain Martin, was honourably acquitted.

== Legacy ==
=== Archaeology ===
On 22 July 1984, while searching for the remains of two British ships, amateur underwater archaeologist Michel Vazquez found the wreck of Hermione.

From 10 August 1992, the Groupe de Recherche en Archéologie Navale conducted a magnetometric survey of the area. They located the wreck at 47° 17,295 N; 02° 37,800 W, and positively identified Hermione from the calibre of the cannonballs, the copper sheathing, the dimensions of key parts, and the absence of 12-pounder guns, which Martin had managed to have retrieved.

The GRAN retrieved an anchor, 16mm musket bullets, cannonballs, bricks, an old 18-pounder gun probably used as ballast, a 29mm × 10mm nail, and a part of the rudder. The survey campaign finished on 5 September 2005.

=== Reconstruction ===
In 1997 a reconstruction project started in Rochefort. The new ship is also named Hermione.

On 18 April 2015, the full-size replica of Hermione started a return voyage to the United States from Rochefort, France. In June 2015 the frigate arrived safely on the American coast.
