= Battle of Cape Henry =

1781 battle of the American Revolutionary War

- Part of the American Revolutionary War
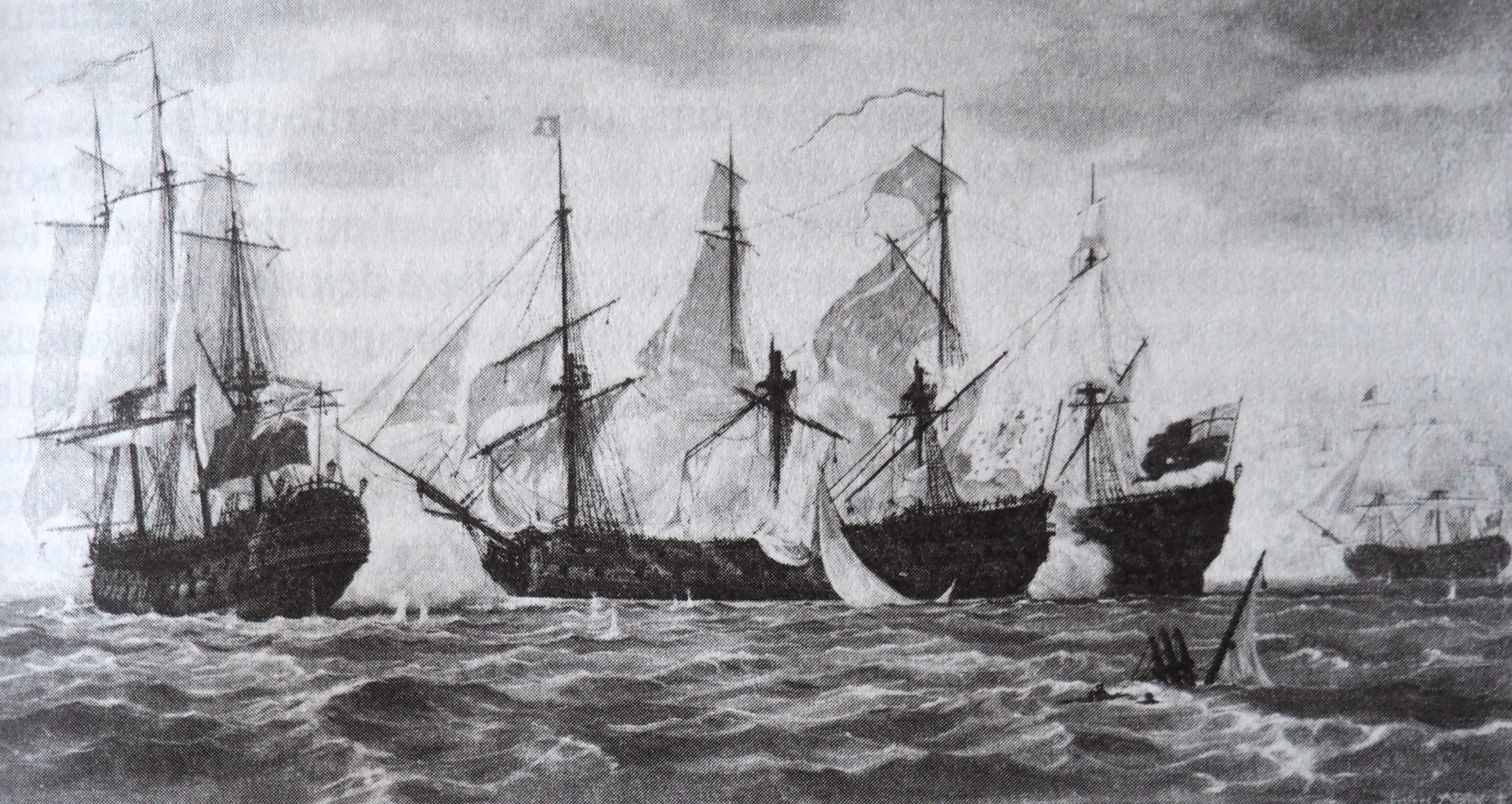
- French painting of the battle
Date	16 March 1781
Location	Off Cape Henry, Atlantic Ocean 37.150°N 75.152°W
Result	Inconclusive

Belligerents
Great Britain	France

Commanders and leaders
Mariot Arbuthnot	Destouches

Strength
8 ships of the line	7 ships of the line 1 frigate

Casualties and losses
30 killed 73 wounded	72 killed 112 wounded

The Battle of Cape Henry was a naval battle in the American War of Independence which took place near the mouth of the Chesapeake Bay on 16 March 1781 between a British squadron under Vice-admiral Mariot Arbuthnot and a French squadron under Admiral Charles René Dominique Sochet, Chevalier Destouches. Destouches, based in Newport, Rhode Island, had sailed for the Chesapeake as part of a joint operation with the Continental Army to oppose the British army of Brigadier General Benedict Arnold that was active in Virginia.

Destouches was asked by General George Washington to take his fleet to the Chesapeake to support military operations against Arnold by the Marquis de Lafayette. Sailing on 8 March, he was followed two days later by Admiral Arbuthnot, who sailed from eastern Long Island. Arbuthnot's fleet outsailed that of Destouches, reaching the Virginia Capes just ahead of Destouches on 16 March. After manoeuvring for several hours, the battle was joined, and both fleets suffered some damage and casualties without losing any ships. However, Arbuthnot was positioned to enter the Chesapeake as the fleets disengaged, frustrating Destouches' objective. Destouches returned to Newport, while Arbuthnot protected the bay for the arrival of additional land troops to reinforce General Arnold.

== Background ==
In December 1780, British General Sir Henry Clinton sent Brigadier General Benedict Arnold (who had changed sides to the British the previous September) with about 1,700 troops to Virginia to do some raiding and to fortify Portsmouth. General George Washington responded by sending the Marquis de Lafayette south with a small army to oppose Arnold. Seeking to trap Arnold between Lafayette's army and a French naval detachment, Washington asked the French admiral Destouches, the commander of the fleet at Newport, Rhode Island for help. Destouches was wary of the threat posed by the slightly larger British North American fleet anchored at Gardiner's Bay off the eastern end of Long Island, and was reluctant to help.

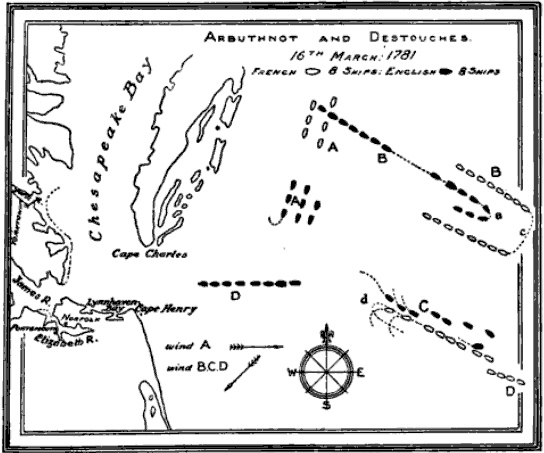
Tactical diagram of the battle by Alfred Thayer Mahan. The British ships are in black, the French ships in white. The positions of the fleets at various points in the battle are labelled as follows: * A: fleets sight each other * B: first tack * C: second tack * D: disengagement

A storm in early February damaged some of Arbuthnot's fleet, which prompted Destouches to send a squadron of three ships south shortly after. When they reached the Chesapeake, the British ships supporting Arnold moved up the shallow Elizabeth River, where the French ships were unable to follow. The French fleet returned to Newport, having as their only success the capture of HMS Romulus, a heavy frigate that was one of several ships sent by the British to investigate the French movements. This modest success, and the encouragement of General Washington, prompted Destouches to embark on a full-scale operation. On 8 March, Washington was in Newport when Destouches sailed with his entire fleet, carrying 1,200 troops for use in land operations when they arrived in the Chesapeake.

Vice-admiral of the White Mariot Arbuthnot, the British fleet commander in North America, was aware that Destouches was planning something, but did not learn of Destouches' sailing until 10 March, and immediately led his fleet out of Gardiner Bay in pursuit. He had the speed advantage of copper-clad vessels and a favourable wind, and reached Cape Henry on 16 March, slightly ahead of Destouches.

Commanders
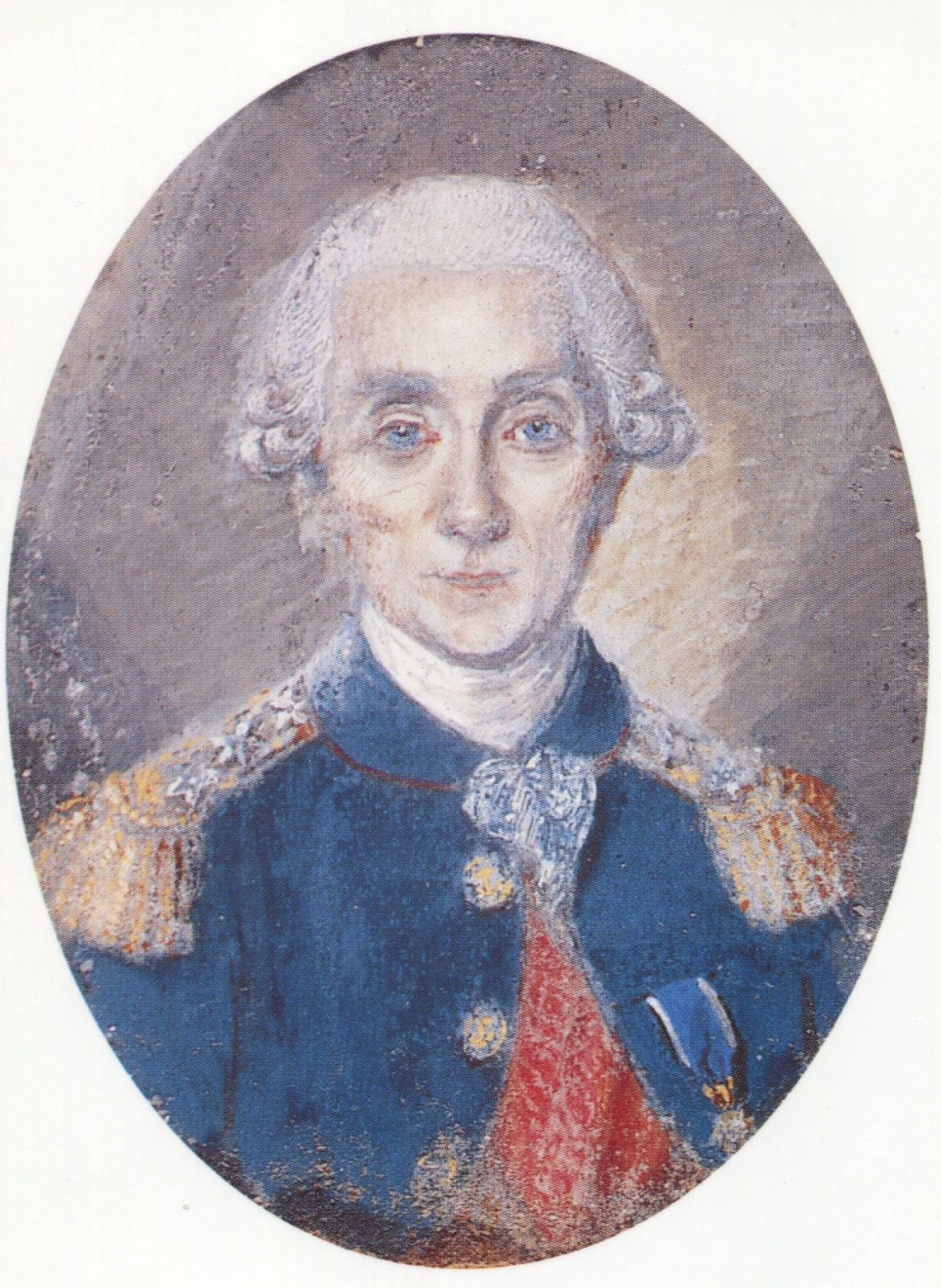
Captain Sochet Des Touches

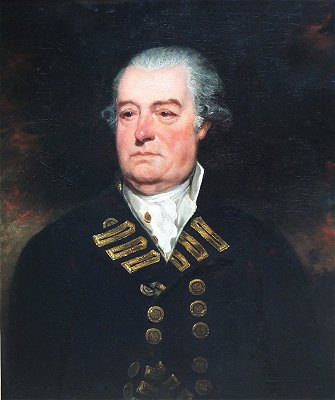
Admiral Mariot Arbuthnot

== Battle ==
Although the two fleets both had eight ships in their lines, the British had an advantage in firepower: the 90-gun HMS London was the largest ship of either fleet (compared to the 80-gun Duc de Bourgogne), while the French fleet also included the recently captured 44-gun Romulus, the smallest vessel on either line. When Arbuthnot spotted the French fleet to his northeast at 6 am on 16 March, they were about 40 nmi (74 km) east-northeast of Cape Henry. Arbuthnot came about, and Destouches ordered his ships to form a line of battle heading west, with the wind. Between 8 and 9 am the winds began shifting, but visibility remained poor, and the two fleets manoeuvred for several hours, each seeking the advantage of the weather gage. From 0815, he French were sailing close-hauled and had the weather gage, and around 0930, Destouches ordered to wear ship in sequence. As they executed the order, the topsail yards of Ardent and Éveillé broke, slowing and disorganising the Destouches' battle line, and the British seized the opportunity to close in. Destouches ordered another turn, further closing to the British, but allowing Ardent and Éveillé to repair and return to their stations, which they did by 1100.

By 1 pm the wind had stabilised from the northeast, and Arbuthnot was coming up on the rear of the French line as both headed east-southeast, tacking against the wind. Destouches ordered to wear ship in sequence again, and brought his line around in front of the advancing British line. With this manoeuvre he surrendered the weather gage (giving Arbuthnot the advantage in determining the attack), but it also positioned his ships relative to the wind such that he could open his lower gundecks in the heavy seas, which the British could not do without the risk of water washing onto the lower decks.

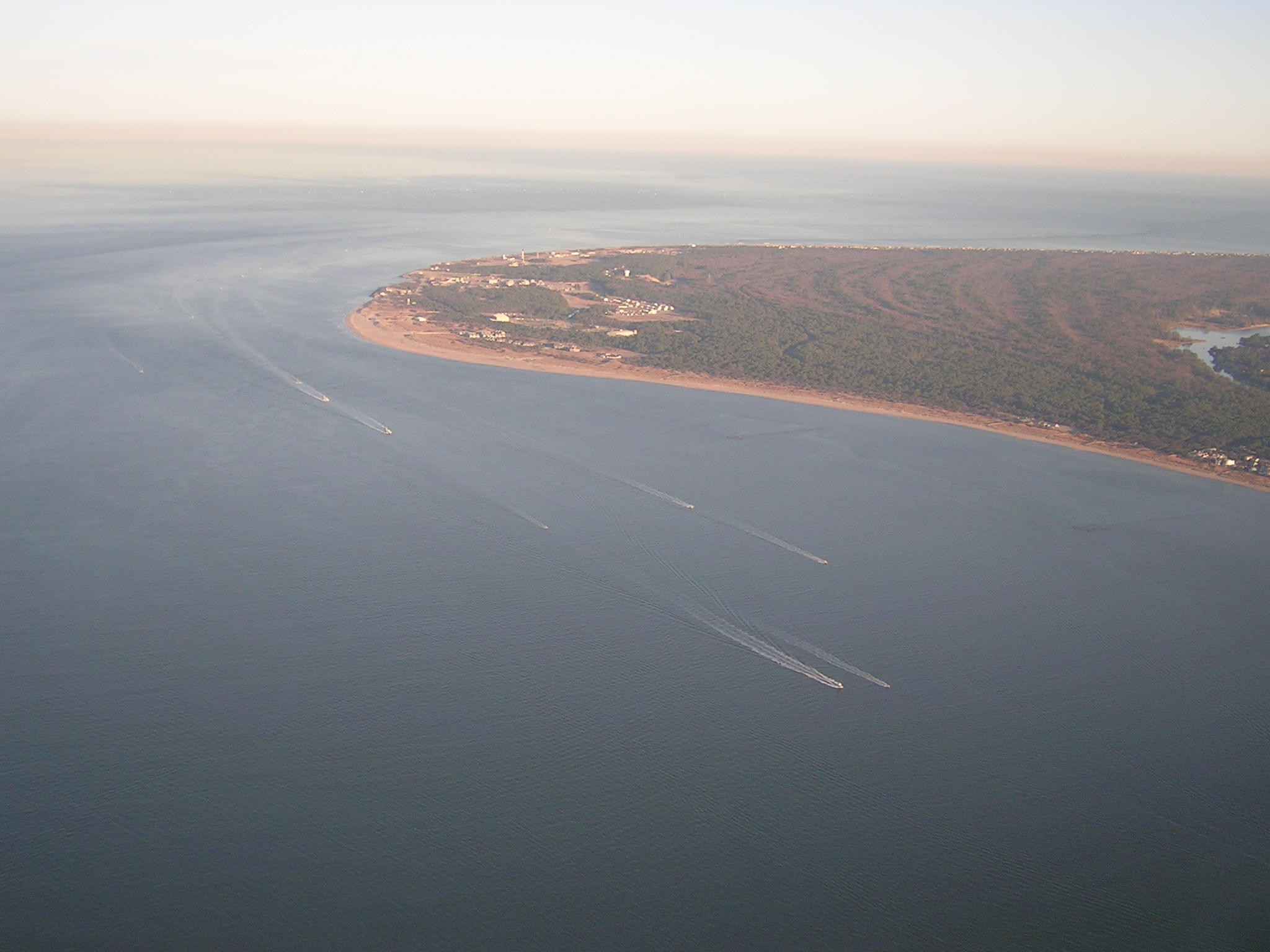
Aerial view of Cape Henry

Arbuthnot responded to the French manoeuvre by ordering his fleet to wear. When the ships in the van of his line made the maneuver, they were fully exposed to the French line's fire, and consequently suffered significant damage. At 1330, the vanguards of both squadron engaged, the French Crossing the T of the three first British ships. Robust, Europe, and Prudent were virtually unmanageable due to damage to their sails and rigging. Arbuthnot kept the signal for maintaining the line flying, and the British fleet thus lined up behind the damaged vessels.

As Conquérant closed in to Robust, a cannonball struck her wheel, killed four helmsmen and sending her Into the wind. the 74-gun Royal Oak and the 100-gun London closed within pistol range, but a lucky shot from Conquérant took off London's topsail yard, forcing her to stop. Conquérant remained exposed for another 30 minutes before she managed to establish a jury rigging and return to the French battle line.

After one hour, Destouches at this point again ordered his fleet to wear in succession, and his ships raked the damaged British ships once more before pulling away to the east. The British ships were too damaged to pursue.

== Aftermath ==
French casualties were 72 killed and 112 wounded, while the British suffered 30 killed and 73 wounded. Arbuthnot pulled into the Chesapeake Bay, thus frustrating the original intent of Destouches' mission, while the French fleet returned to Newport. After transports delivered 2,000 men to reinforce Arnold, Arbuthnot returned to New York. He resigned his post as station chief due to age and infirmity in July and left for England, ending a stormy, difficult, and unproductive relationship with General Clinton.

On 17 March, Destouches held a war council, which concluded that the ships were too damaged to resume combat, and decided to call Newport to repair.

The United States Congress voted officials thanks to Destouches. General Washington, unhappy that the operation had failed, wrote a letter that was mildly critical of Destouches. This letter was intercepted and published in an English newspaper, prompting a critical response to Washington by the Comte de Rochambeau, the French army commander at Newport. The Comte de Barras, who arrived in May to take command of the Newport station, justified Destouches' decision not to pursue the attack: "It is a principle in war that one should risk much to defend one's positions, and very little to attack those of the enemy." Naval historian Alfred Thayer Mahan points out that "this aversion from risks [...] goes far to explain the French want of success in the war."

Lafayette, when he learned of the French failure, turned back north to rejoin Washington. Washington then ordered Lafayette to stay in Virginia, having learned of the reinforcements sent to Arnold. Although the French operation to support Lafayette was unsuccessful, the later naval operations by the Comte de Grasse that culminated in the French naval victory in the September 1781 Battle of the Chesapeake paved the way for a successful naval blockade and land siege of Lord Cornwallis' army at Yorktown, Virginia.

== Order of battle ==
British fleet
Ship	Rate	Guns	Commander	Casualties			Notes
Ship	Rate	Guns	Commander	Killed	Wounded	Total	Notes
Robust	Third rate	74	Captain Phillips Cosby	15	21	36	
Europe	Third rate	64	Captain Smith Child	8	19	27	
Prudent	Third rate	64	Captain Thomas Burnet	7	24	31	
Royal Oak	Third rate	74	Captain William Swiney	0	3	3	Arbuthnot's flag
London	Second rate	90	Captain David Graves	0	0	0	Sir Thomas Graves' flag
Adamant	Fourth rate	50	Captain Gideon Johnstone	0	0	0	
Bedford	Third rate	74	Captain Edmund Affleck	0	0	0	Morrissey probably incorrectly lists Bedford with 64; others, e.g. Mahan (1898), p. 492, list her as carrying 74 guns.
America	Third rate	64	Captain Samuel Thompson	0	0	0	
Casualty summary: 30 killed, 67 wounded, 97 total

Other ships

- Guadelupe (frigate, 28, Hugh Robinson)
- Pearl (frigate, 32, George Montagu)
- Iris (frigate, 32, George Dawson)
- Medea (frigate, 28, Henry Duncan)

French fleet
Ship	Type	Guns	Commander	Casualties			Notes
Ship	Type	Guns	Commander	Killed	Wounded	Total	Notes
Conquérant	74-gun	74	Charles-Marie de la Grandière	43	50	93	Lost her rudder and most of her rigging
Provence	64-gun	64	Louis-André-Joseph de Lombard	1	7	8	
Ardent	64-gun	64	Charles-René-Louis Bernard de Marigny	19	35	54	Mainmast damaged
Neptune	74-gun	74	Charles de Médine (WIA)	4	2	6	Morrissey and Mahan claim the Neptune as Destouches' flagship.
Duc de Bourgogne	80-gun	80–84	Louis Nicolas de Durfort	6	5	11	Morrissey apparently confuses this ship with the Bourgogne, 74 guns; other sources uniformly identify her as the Duc de Bourgogne. In French rating, Duc de Bourgogne was an 80-gun ship (Lapeyrouse, p. 170). She might have actually carried 84 guns (Mahan p. 492).
Jason	64-gun	64	Jean Isaac Chadeau de la Clocheterie	5	1	6	
Éveillé	64-gun	64	Armand Le Gardeur de Tilly	1	3	4	
Romulus	Fifth rate	44	Jacques-Aimé Le Saige de La Villèsbrunne	2	1	3	This was a two-deck ship built by the British in 1777.
Casualty summary: 72 killed, 112 wounded, 184 total.

Other ships

- Hermione (frigate, 36, Latouche)
- Gentille (frigate, 32, Mengaud de la Haye)
- Fantasque (14, M. de Vaudoré)
- Surveillante (frigate, 32, Jean-Marie de Villeneuve Cillart)

== Legacy ==
The battle has been memorialized by American singer-songwriter Todd Snider in "The Ballad of Cape Henry" on his 2008 album Peace Queer:

Cape Henry, Cape Henry, the battlefield's on fire
White water, white water, with those flames climbing higher
We fired our cannon at least two hours or more
Cape Henry, Cape Henry off of that old Virginia shore

Although there is a marker commemorating the Battle of the Chesapeake at the Cape Henry Memorial in Virginia, there is no recognition of this battle at the site.

== Citations ==
Bibliography

- Balch, Thomas Willing; Balch, Edwin Swift; Balch, Elise Willing (1895). The French in America During the War of Independence of the United States, 1777–1783, Volume 2. Philadelphia: Porter & Coates. p. 175. OCLC 2183804.
- Beatson, Robert (1804). Naval and military Memoirs of Great Britain, From 1727 to 1783, Volume 6. London: Longman, Hurst, Rees and Orme. OCLC 4643956.
- Contenson, Ludovic (1934). La Société des Cincinnati de France et la guerre d'Amérique (1778–1783). Paris: éditions Auguste Picard. OCLC 7842336.
- Davis, Burke (1970). The Campaign That Won America: the Story of Yorktown. New York: Dial Press. OCLC 248958859.
- Gardiner, Asa Bird (1905). The Order of the Cincinnati in France. United States: Rhode Island State Society of Cincinnati. p. 112. OCLC 5104049.
- La Jonquière, Christian (1996). Les Marins Français sous Louis XVI: Guerre d'Indépendance Américaine (in French). Issy-les-Moulineaux Muller. ISBN 978-2-904255-12-0. OCLC 243902833.
- Goodwin, Peter (2002). Nelson's Ships: A History Of The Vessels In Which He Served, 1771–1805. Mechanicsburg, PA: Stackpole Books. ISBN 978-0-8117-1007-7. OCLC 249275709.
- Lapeyrouse Bonfils, Léonard Léonce (1845). Histoire de la Marine Française, Volume 3 (in French). Paris: Dentu. OCLC 10443764.
- Mahan, Alfred Thayer (1898). Major Operations of the Royal Navy, 1762–1783: Being chapter XXXI in The royal navy. A history. Boston: Little, Brown. p. 492. OCLC 46778589.
- Mascart, Jean (2000). La Vie et les Travaux du Chevalier Jean-Charles de Borda, 1733–1799 (in French). Paris: Presses Paris Sorbonne. ISBN 978-2-84050-173-2. OCLC 264793608.
- McCarthy, Michael (2005). Ships' Fastenings: From Sewn Boat to Steamship. College Station, TX: Texas A&M University Press. ISBN 978-1-58544-451-9. OCLC 467080350.
- Monaque, Rémi (2000). Les aventures de Louis-René de Latouche-Tréville, compagnon de La Fayette et commandant de l'Hermione (in French). Paris: SPM.
- Morrissey, Brendan (1997). Yorktown 1781: the World Turned Upside Down. London: Osprey. ISBN 978-1-85532-688-0. OCLC 39028166.
- Perkins, James Breck (1911). France in the American Revolution. Boston: Houghton Mifflin. OCLC 177577.
- Russell, David Lee (2000). The American Revolution in the Southern Colonies. Jefferson, NC: McFarland. ISBN 978-0-7864-0783-5. OCLC 44562323.
- Smith, Fitz-Henry (1913). The French at Boston during the Revolution: With Particular Reference to the French Fleets and the Fortifications in the Harbor. Boston: self-published. OCLC 9262209.
- Troude, Onésime-Joachim (1867). Batailles navales de la France (in French). Vol. 2. Challamel ainé.
- Clark, William Bell, ed. (1964). Naval Documents Of The American Revolution, Volume 1 (Dec. 1774 – Sept. 1775). Washington D.C., U.S. Navy Department.

External links

- "LastFM: The Ballad of Cape Henry". Last.fm Ltd.
- "National Park Service: Cape Henry Memorial". National Park Service. Archived from the original on 28 August 2010.
- This is a recording of the text of the article on the Battle of Cape Henry read on 21 May 2020.
