= Jean-Marie de Villeneuve Cillart =

French Navy officer of the War of American Independence

Jean-Marie de Villeneuve Cillart was a French Navy officer. He served in the War of American Independence.

== Biography ==
Cillart was born in an aristocratic family. His father was captain in a dragoon unit, and two of his brothers, Étienne-François de Cillart de Villeneuve and Armand-François Cillart de Suville, also served in the Navy.

Cillart joined the Navy as a Garde-Marine on 19 March 1756. He was promoted to Lieutenant on 1 October 1773, and to Captain on 4 April 1780, effective 9 May 1781.

Cillart captained the frigate 32-gun frigate Surveillante, part of the Expédition Particulière under Admiral Ternay, composed of 7 ships of the line, (Note: the 80-gun Duc de Bourgogne, under Ternay d'Arsac (admiral) and Médine (flag captain); the 74-gun Neptune, under Sochet Des Touches, and Conquérant, under La Grandière; and the 64-gun Provence under Lombard, Ardent under Bernard de Marigny, Jason under La Clocheterie and Éveillé under Le Gardeur de Tilly) 3 frigates (Note: Surveillante, Amazone under La Pérouse, and Bellone) and 36 transports. Surveillante, as vanguard of the squadron, arrived at Boston on 11 June 1780.

From then on, Surveillante was attached to the Ternay's squadron as part of a frigate division Cillart, with his flag on Surveillante, and also comprising Amazone and Hermione, which had been at Boston since 27 April already.

He took part in the Battle of Cape Henry on 16 March 1781.

On 5 June 1781, as Surveillante was arriving at Saint-Domingue from America, he encountered the 48-gun frigate HMS Ulysses. A chased ensued and at 2130, Ulysses caught up with Surveillante. After 2 hours and a half of battle, the frigates broke the engagement.

On 24 October 1781, after the Siege of Yorktown, Surveillante brought Gontaut de Lauzun to France to bring the news of the victory. He arrived at Brest on 15 November.

Cillart was killed at the Battle of Quibéron in July 1795. Two of his nephews, Étienne Cillart de Villeneuve and Armand Cillart de Villeneuve, were also killed with him.

== Sources and references ==
Notes

Citations

Bibliography

- Contenson, Ludovic (1934). La Société des Cincinnati de France et la guerre d'Amérique (1778-1783). Paris: éditions Auguste Picard. OCLC 7842336.
- Hauterive, André Borel; Révérend, Albert (1855). Annuaire de la noblesse de France et des maisons souveraines de l'Europe. Vol. 12. Paris: Champion.
- Lacour-Gayet, Georges (1910). La marine militaire de la France sous le règne de Louis XVI. Paris: Honoré Champion.
- Monaque, Rémi (2000). Les aventures de Louis-René de Latouche-Tréville, compagnon de La Fayette et commandant de l'Hermione (in French). Paris: SPM.
- Troude, Onésime-Joachim (1867). Batailles navales de la France (in French). Vol. 2. Challamel ainé.
