= French frigate Bellone (1778) =

Iphigénie-class frigate of the French Navy

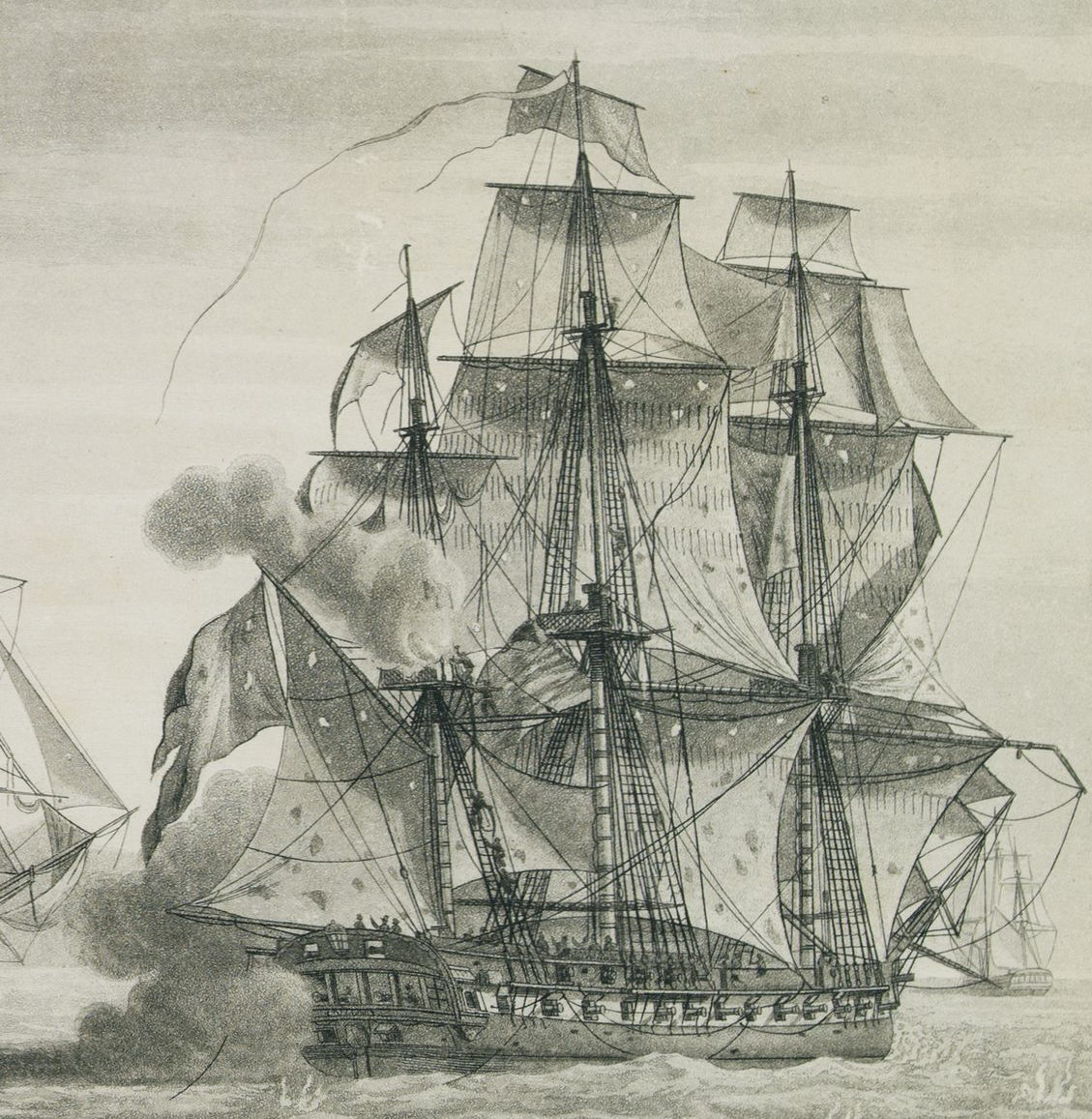
- Bellone at the Battle of Tory Island

History

France
- Name: N°6; Bellone
- Namesake: Bellona
- Builder: Saint Malo
- Laid down: January 1778
- Launched: 22 August 1778
- Commissioned: February 1779
- Captured: 12 October 1798

Great Britain
- Name: Proserpine
- Acquired: 12 October 1798
- Fate: Hulk in Plymouth; Broken up 1806

General characteristics
- Class & type: Iphigénie-class frigate
- Displacement: 1,150 tonneaux
- Tons burthen: 620 port tonneaux; 8882/94
- Length: 44.2 m (145 ft)
- Beam: 11.2 m (37 ft)
- Draught: 4.9 m (16 ft)
- Propulsion: Sail
- Armament: 32 guns: (Note: The number of guns was reported to be 36 or even 40. Study of the wreck confirms that Bellone carried 32 guns.); UD: 28 × 18-pounder long guns; Spardeck:4 × 6-pounder long guns

Bellone was a 32-gun Iphigénie-class frigate of the French Navy launched in 1778. She took part in the American Revolutionary War in the Indian Ocean under Pierre André de Suffren, and later served in the French Revolutionary Wars, being present at the Glorious First of June. The Royal Navy captured her on 12 October 1798 at the Battle of Tory Island and commissioned her as HMS Proserpine. However, she spent the entirety of her career as a hulk undergoing repairs in Plymouth before being broken up in 1806.

== French service ==
In January 1780, Bellone received copper sheathing.

=== Operations off America ===
On 2 May 1780, she departed Brest with the 7-ship and 3-frigate Expédition Particulière under Admiral Ternay, escorting 36 transports carrying troops to support the Continental Army in the War of American Independence. The squadron comprised the 80-gun Duc de Bourgogne, under Ternay d'Arsac (admiral) and Médine (flag captain); the 74-gun Neptune, under Sochet Des Touches, and Conquérant, under La Grandière; and the 64-gun Provence under Lombard, Ardent under Bernard de Marigny, Jason under La Clocheterie and Éveillé under Le Gardeur de Tilly, and the frigates Surveillante under Villeneuve Cillart, Amazone under La Pérouse, and Bellone. Amazone, which constituted the vanguard of the fleet, arrived at Boston on 11 June 1780.

=== Indian Ocean campaign of the American Revolutionary War ===
In October 1781, Bellone, under Captain Étienne-François de Cillart de Villeneuve, (Note: Étienne-François de Cillart de Villeneuve was brother to Jean-Marie de Villeneuve Cillart) was off Cape of Good Hope escorting the transports Neker and Sévère. The squadron encountered the 50-gun HMS Hannibal, which captured the transports and brought them to Saint Helena. Bellone sailed on to Isle de France and reinforced the French squadron under Rear-Admiral Thomas d'Estienne d'Orves.

On 9 February 1782, Estienne d'Orves and Suffren assumed command of the squadron. He re-appointed his captains and gave command of Bellone to Jean André de Pas de Beaulieu.

On 14 February 1782 Bellone captured the sloop HMS Chaser in a single ship action. The French took her into service as the corvette Chasseur.

On 1 March 1782, under Captain de Beaulieu, Bellone returned to Trinquebar from a cruise in the Indian Ocean, where she had captured or destroyed 14 merchantmen. In April 1782, Bellone captured the East Indiaman Cartier, which came from China, and brought her to Batacalo. In June of the same year, she captured a British "both", in the roads of Negapatnam that the French took into service as Negapatnam. The next month Negapatnam was at Pondicherry with the French squadron under Admiral Suffren, but her subsequent disposition is unknown. Around late May, Bellone cut out the snow Raiker, with a cargo of arak, and three smaller ships, near the fort of Nagapattinam.

In July 1782, in the wake of the Battle of Negapatam, Suffren promoted Beaulieu to the command of Brillant, replacing him with Pierrevert.

On 12 August 1782, in the runup to the Battle of Trincomalee, Bellone had her mainmast damaged by a gust of wind and sailed to Batacalo for repairs. En route, she encountered HMS Coventry, under Andrew Mitchell. In the ensuing Action of 12 August 1782, Coventry killed or wounded the senior officers of Bellone, which allowed her to make good her escape.

In the wake of the Battle of Trincomalee, Suffren sent Bellone to reconnaitre the harbour of Cuddalore and investigate whether a British attack was imminent. Bellone returned on 23 September 1782 and could report that everything was quiet at Cuddalore.

In January 1783, she was under Villaret-Joyeuse.

=== Later career ===
On 5 February 1791, under Captain de Méhérenc de Saint Pierre, Bellone departed Brest with Amphitrite, bound for Martinique.

From May to December 1792, she cruised the North Sea, before returning to Brest. On 8 October 1792, her commanding officer, Lieutenant Leprince, committed suicide, and the First Officer, Lieutenant Lafargue, took over. In August 1793, she ran aground at Quibéron, but was successfully refloated.

Bellone took part in the Glorious First of June.

In February 1795, under Lieutenant Anger, she crossed from Bergen to Brest. She took part in the Expédition d'Irlande.

== Capture and fate ==
Under Louis Léon Jacob, Bellone took part in the Battle of Tory Island on 12 October 1798. There, she was captured by HMS Melampus and HMS Ethalion and was commissioned in the Royal Navy as HMS Proserpine. She had 20 killed and 45 wounded in the action. The Royal Navy turned her into a hulk, with Captain William Ferris commanding her from August 1804. Still, although officially "under repair" at Plymouth, she was never more than a hulk. The British Admiralty decommissioned Proserpine and sold her to be broken up on 27 August 1806.
