= French ship Duc de Bourgogne (1751) =

Ship of the line of the French Navy

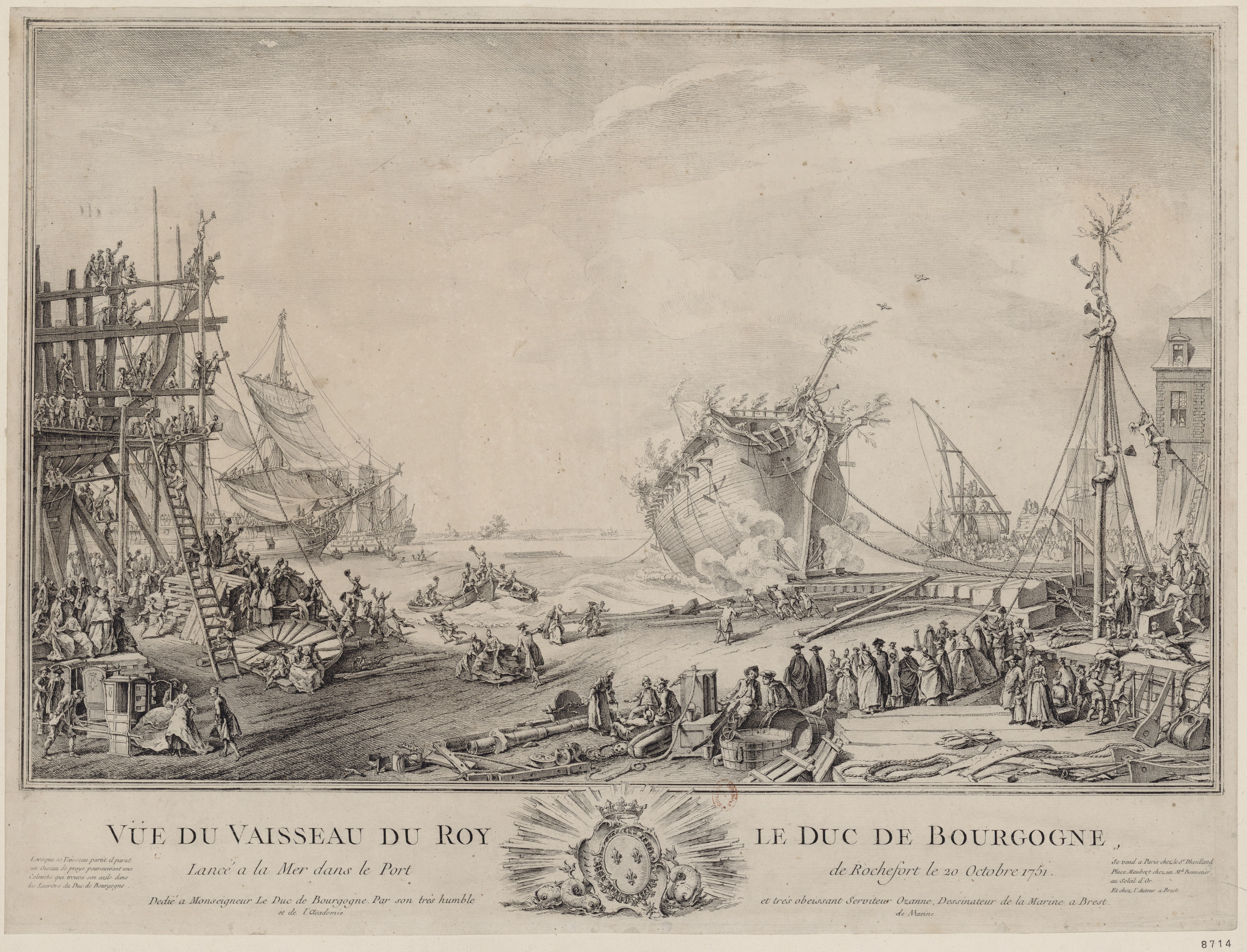
- Illustration of the launching of Duc de Bourgogne (right)

History

France
- Name: Duc de Bourgogne
- Namesake: Duke of Burgundy
- Builder: Rochefort
- Laid down: January 1749
- Launched: 20 October 1751
- Completed: December 1752
- Renamed: Laid down as Brave; renamed Peuple in September 1792; then Caton in February 1794
- Fate: Broken up in 1800-1801

General characteristics
- Displacement: 3400 tonneaux
- Tons burthen: 1800 port tonneaux
- Length: 56.52 m (185 ft 5 in)
- Beam: 14.46 m (47 ft 5 in)
- Draught: 7.15 m (23 ft 5 in)
- Depth of hold: 7.31 m (24 ft 0 in)
- Sail plan: Full-rigged
- Complement: 850, + 8–14 officers
- Armament: 80 guns; 30 × 36-pounder guns; 32 × 18-pounder guns; 18 × 8-pounder guns

Duc de Bourgogne was an 80-gun ship of the line of the French Navy.

== Career ==
She was refitted twice, in 1761 and 1779, when she received a copper sheathing.

On 2 May 1780, she departed from Brest as the flagship of the 7-ship and 3-frigate Expédition Particulière under Admiral Ternay, escorting 36 transports carrying troops to support the Continental Army in the War of American Independence. The squadron comprised the 80-gun Duc de Bourgogne, under Admiral Ternay and Médine (flag captain); the 74-gun Neptune, under Sochet Des Touches, and Conquérant, under La Grandière; and the 64-gun Provence under Lombard, Ardent under Bernard de Marigny, Jason under La Clocheterie and Éveillé under Le Gardeur de Tilly, and the frigates Surveillante under Villeneuve Cillart, Amazone under La Pérouse, and Bellone. Amazone, which constituted the vanguard of the fleet, arrived at Boston on 11 June 1780.

She took part in the Battle of Cape Henry on 16 March 1781 under Nicolas-Louis de Durfort.

Duc de Bourgogne took part in the Battle of the Saintes, where she collided with Bourgogne.

In 1792, she was renamed Peuple, and then Caton in 1794.

She was condemned in February 1798 at Brest, and eventually broken up in January 1800.
