= Charles-Henri-Louis d'Arsac de Ternay =

French admiral (1723–1780)

Charles-Henri-Louis d'Arsac, chevalier de Ternay
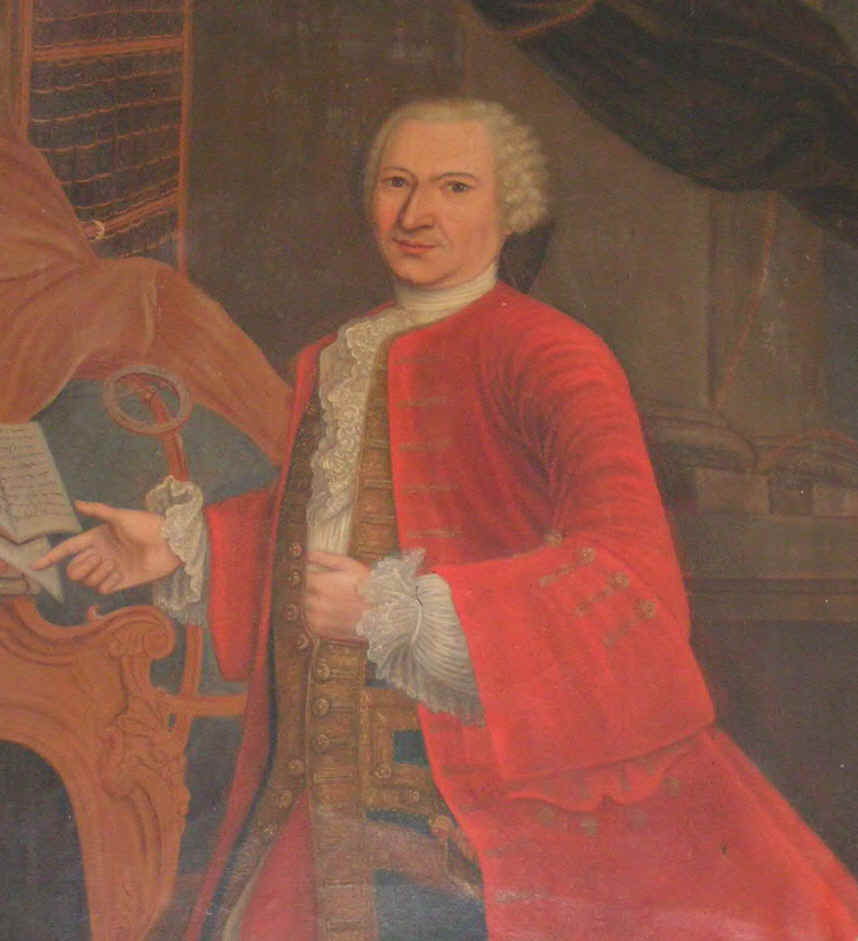
- Born: 27 January 1723; Angers, France
- Died: 15 December 1780 (aged 57); Newport, Rhode Island
- Burial place: Trinity Churchyard
- Military career
- Allegiance: France
- Branch: French Navy
- Service years: 1738–1780
- Rank: Rear Admiral
- Unit: Expédition Particulière
- Conflicts: Seven Years' War; American Revolutionary War

Charles-Henri-Louis d'Arsac, chevalier de Ternay (27 January 1723 – 15 December 1780) was a French naval officer who served in the Seven Years' War and the American Revolutionary War. He led a French expedition which captured St. John's, Newfoundland in 1762. During the American Revolutionary War, Terney was appointed commander of the French Navy contingent of the Expédition Particulière, which brought thousands of French Royal Army troops to the United States in 1780. However, he died in Newport, Rhode Island not long after arriving there.

== Early life ==
Ternay was born on 27 January 1723, probably in Angers, to Charles-François d'Arsac, Marquis de Ternay and Louise Lefebvre de Laubrière. He served as a page in the Knights of Malta beginning in 1737, and joined the French Navy the following year. He rose through the ranks, and received his first command, the Robuste, on 10 January 1761.

== Seven Years' War ==
In 1762, late in the Seven Years' War, Ternay was chosen to lead a secret expedition against the British Newfoundland Colony. With instructions to take and hold the colony, and possibly also make an attack on Fortress Louisbourg, then in British hands, Ternay led a squadron of two ships of the line, one frigate, and two flutes through the British blockade of the French coast from Brest, France on 20 May 1762. Arriving at Bay Bulls on 20 June, he landed 750 soldiers, led by Joseph-Louis-Bernard de Cléron d'Haussonville, who captured St. John's without resistance from its small British garrison. Ternay then oversaw the destruction of St. John's fishing stages and fishing fleet. British estimates of the damage caused by Ternay's squadron ran to £1 million.

Although the French had not anticipated a British response until the next year, General Sir Jeffery Amherst was alerted to the raid in July, and organized an expedition to recover Newfoundland. A British fleet arrived on 12 September, landing 1,500 troops the next day at Torbay. Two days later the French troops had retreated into Fort William after the Battle of Signal Hill. In a council, Ternay advocated abandoning the position, but was apparently outvoted, with the council opting to leave the ground forces and some marines, but also making provision for their eventual recovery by the fleet after it left the harbour. However, given a favourable wind and foggy conditions, Ternay decided to depart that night, and slipped away, leaving the French army to surrender three days later. Ternay's return to France was difficult: he was forced to run from British ships to the Spanish port of A Coruña, and only reached Brest in January 1763. Although criticised by d'Haussonville for abandoning him, Ternay's actions met with approval, since he had managed to save his fleet.

== War of American Independence ==
Ternay's grave at the Trinity Churchyard in Newport

After the war he continued in several ship commands, and was finally promoted to brigadier general in 1771, when he was also named governor-general of Isle de France (now Mauritius) and Île-Bourbon (present-day Réunion). He was promoted to rear admiral in November 1776.

In 1780 he was given command of the naval forces of the Expédition Particulière, which carried the French army of the Comte de Rochambeau to Newport, Rhode Island. On 2 May 1780, he departed Brest with a 7-ship and 3-frigate squadron, escorting 36 transports carrying troops to support the Continental Army in the War of American Independence. The squadron comprised the 80-gun Duc de Bourgogne, under Ternay d'Arsac (admiral) and Médine (flag captain); the 74-gun Neptune, under Sochet Des Touches, and Conquérant, under La Grandière; and the 64-gun Provence under Lombard, Ardent under Bernard de Marigny, Jason under La Clocheterie and Éveillé under Le Gardeur de Tilly, and the frigates Surveillante under Villeneuve Cillart, Amazone under La Pérouse, and Bellone. Amazone, which constituted the vanguard of the fleet, arrived at Boston on 11 June 1780.

Coat of Arms of Charles-Henri-Louis d'Arsac de Ternay

Ternay's fleet was blockaded by the British after his arrival. He died of typhus at Hunter House, which was the French headquarters on Washington Street in Newport, on 15 December 1780. Sochet Des Touches assumed command of the expedition.

Ternay's entry into the Knights of Malta included a vow of celibacy, so he consequently never married or had children. He was buried in the churchyard of Trinity Church in Newport, where memorials given by King Louis XVI and the United States Congress have been placed in his honour. He was posthumously enrolled in the Society of the Cincinnati for his role in the war. In the Port Glaud district of Mahé, Seychelles, Baie Ternay (a bay) and Cap Ternay (a cape) are named after him. There is a bay Ternay in Primorsky Krai, Russia, which was discovered by La Pérouse on June 23, 1787, and named after Ternay. On that bay there also exists a settlement with a derived name.
