= French frigate Surveillante (1778) =

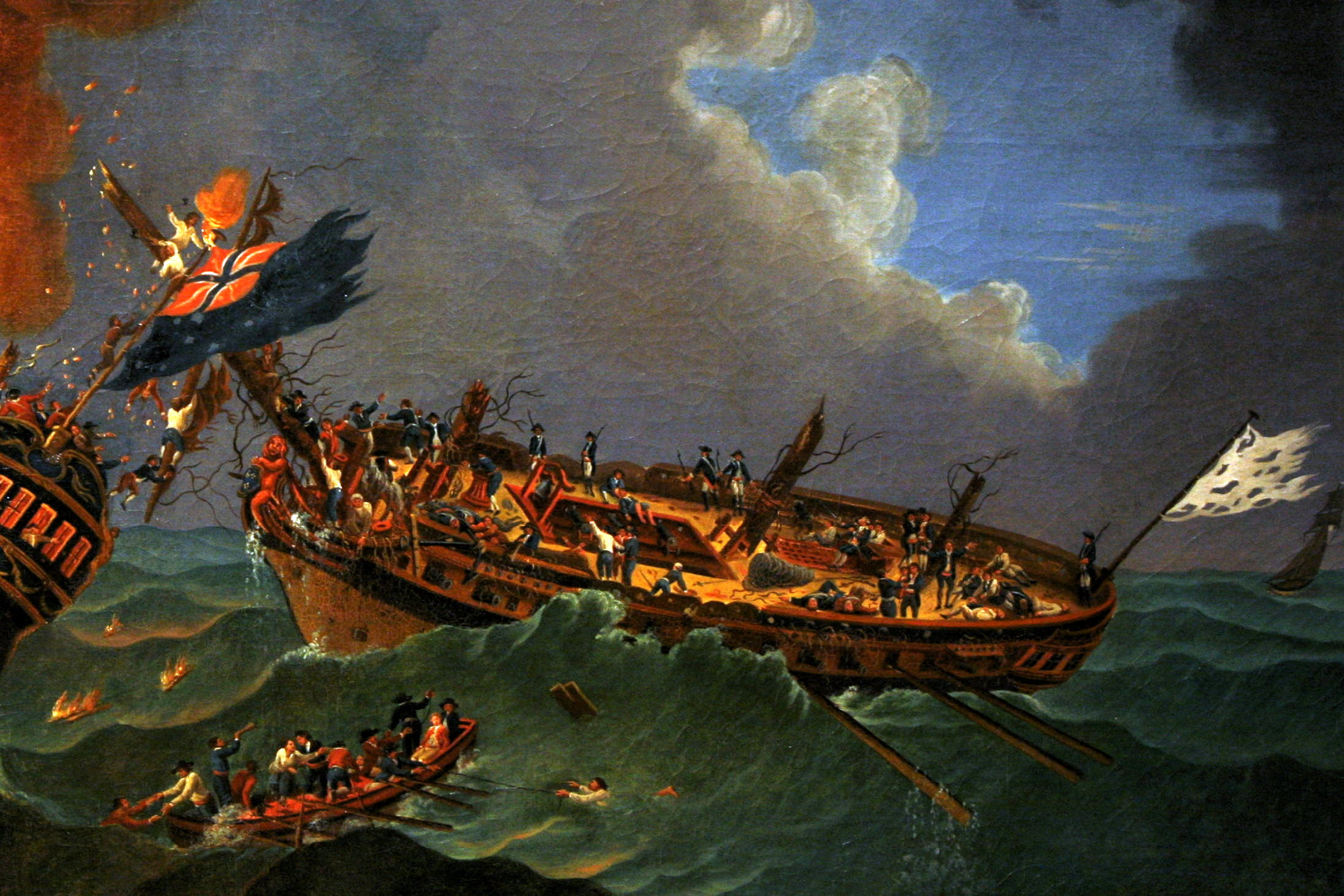
- Surveillante at the action of 6 October 1779

History

France
- Name: Surveillante
- Namesake: French for "monitor, supervisor"
- Builder: Lorient
- Laid down: August 1777
- Launched: 26 March 1778
- Commissioned: May 1778
- Decommissioned: January 1797
- Fate: Scuttled 1796

General characteristics
- Class & type: Iphigénie-class frigate
- Displacement: 1,150 tonneaux
- Tons burthen: 620 port tonneaux
- Length: 44.2 m (145 ft 0 in)
- Beam: 11.2 m (36 ft 9 in)
- Draught: 4.9 m (16 ft 1 in)
- Sail plan: Full-rigged ship
- Armament: 28 × 18-pounder long guns; 4 × 6-pounder long guns (Note: The number of guns was reported to be 36 or even 40. Study of the wreck confirms that Surveillante had 32.)

Surveillante (French pronunciation: [syʁ.vɛ.jɑ̃t]) was an 32-gun Iphigénie-class frigate of the French Navy. She took part in the American Revolutionary War, where she became famous for fighting the action of 6 October 1779; in 1783, she brought the news that the war was over to America. She later took part in the French Revolutionary Wars, and was eventually scuttled during the Expédition d'Irlande after sustaining severe damage in a storm. The wreck was found in 1979 and is now a memorial.

== Career ==
=== Early career ===
Surveillante was laid down in August 1777 in Lorient as the second frigate of the Iphigénie class, a series of 32-gun frigates carrying 12-pounder guns designed by Léon Guignace. She was launched on 26 March 1778, and commissioned in May. The very same month, she was refitted as to upgrade her hull with copper sheathing, which was being gradually introduced in the French Navy. In June 1778, Surveillante was part of a squadron of five French frigates that were seeking to retaliate against the British for their capture of three French vessels earlier that month, all before any declaration of war. On 24 June, off Ushant, the French encountered HMS Folkestone, an 8-gun cutter. Folkestone then surrendered to Surveillante. The French took Folkestone into service under her existing name.

In 1779, she was part of a division under Louis Augustin de Monteclerc, also comprising the 64-gun Solitaire and the frigates Inconstante, cruising to hunt down privateers. The division returned to Brest on 4 May 1779 with 400 prisoners.

After her refit, Surveillante took part in the Naval operations in the American Revolutionary War, capturing HMS Spitfire on 19 April 1779.

=== Battle against HMS Quebec ===
On 6 October 1779, off Ushant, Surveillante, under captain Couédic de Kergoaler, met with the 32-gun HMS Quebec, under Captain George Farmer. A furious, three-and-a-half-hour-long combat ensued. Both ships suffered heavy casualties and were completely dismasted. The battle ended when Quebec, firing through her own sails which covered her gunports, took fire and exploded. Surveillante, her hull leaking, had 30 killed and 85 wounded. Her boat rescued whatever British crew had survived, and British and French sailors then had to work together to keep her afloat. She returned to Brest the next day, and the British are said to have been treated as castaways rather than prisoners of war.

Numerous paintings and drawings of the battle were made, notably by Auguste-Louis Rossel de Cercy (a key exhibit of the Musée de la Marine in Paris), by George Carter and by Robert Dodd.

Depictions of the battle
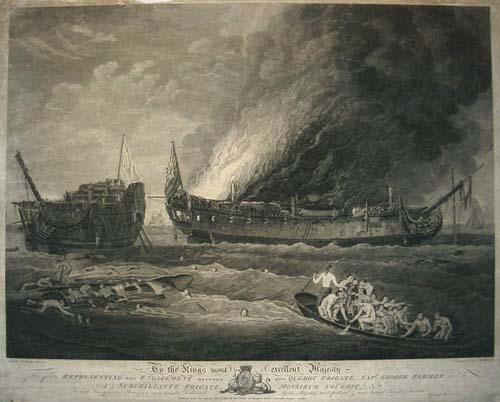
By George Carter

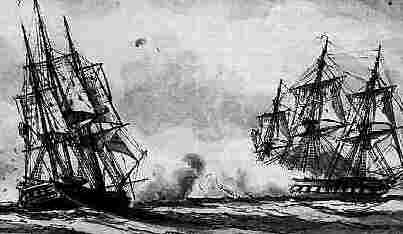
Engraving kept at Musée Ramezay.

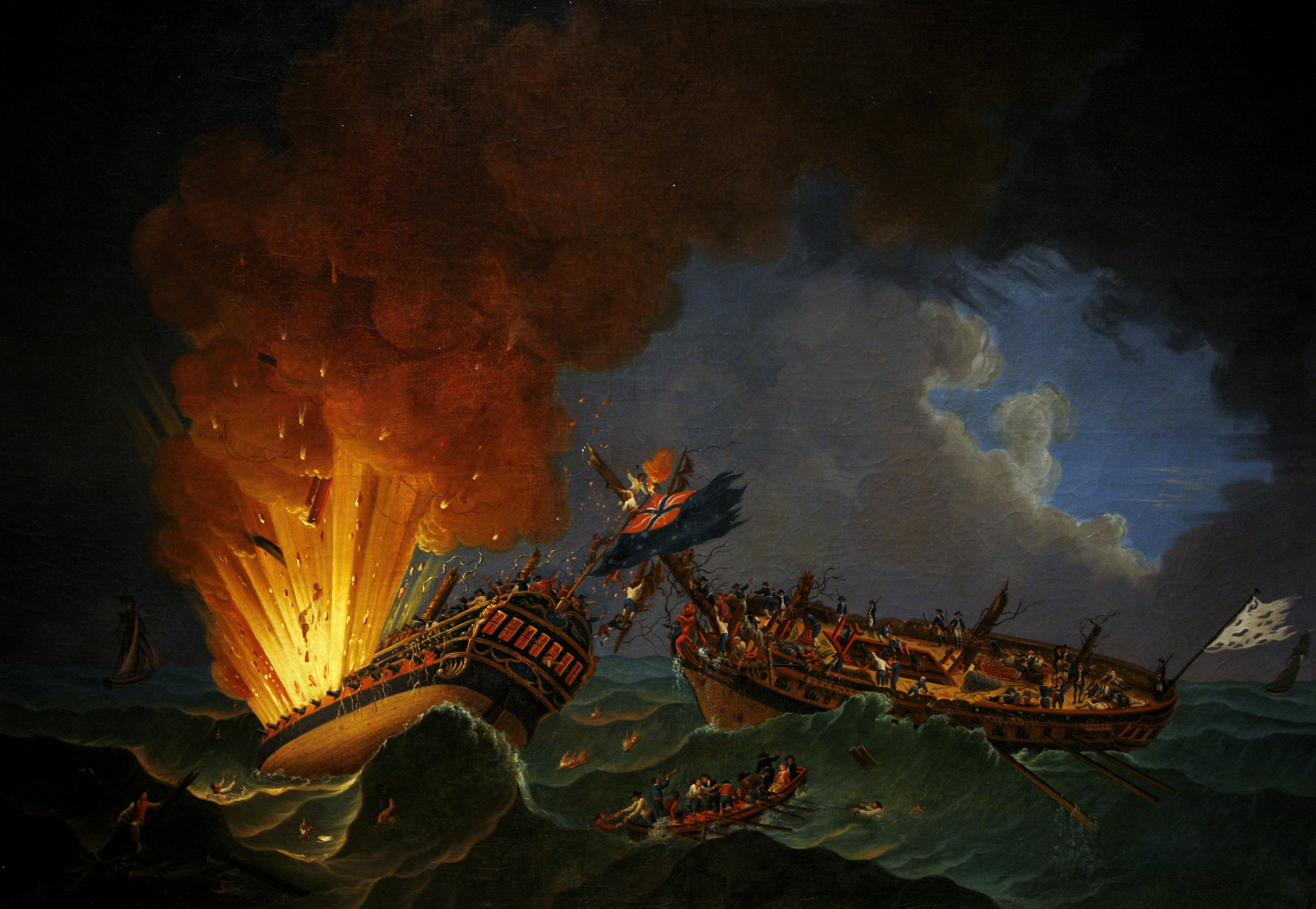
Auguste-Louis Rossel de Cercy

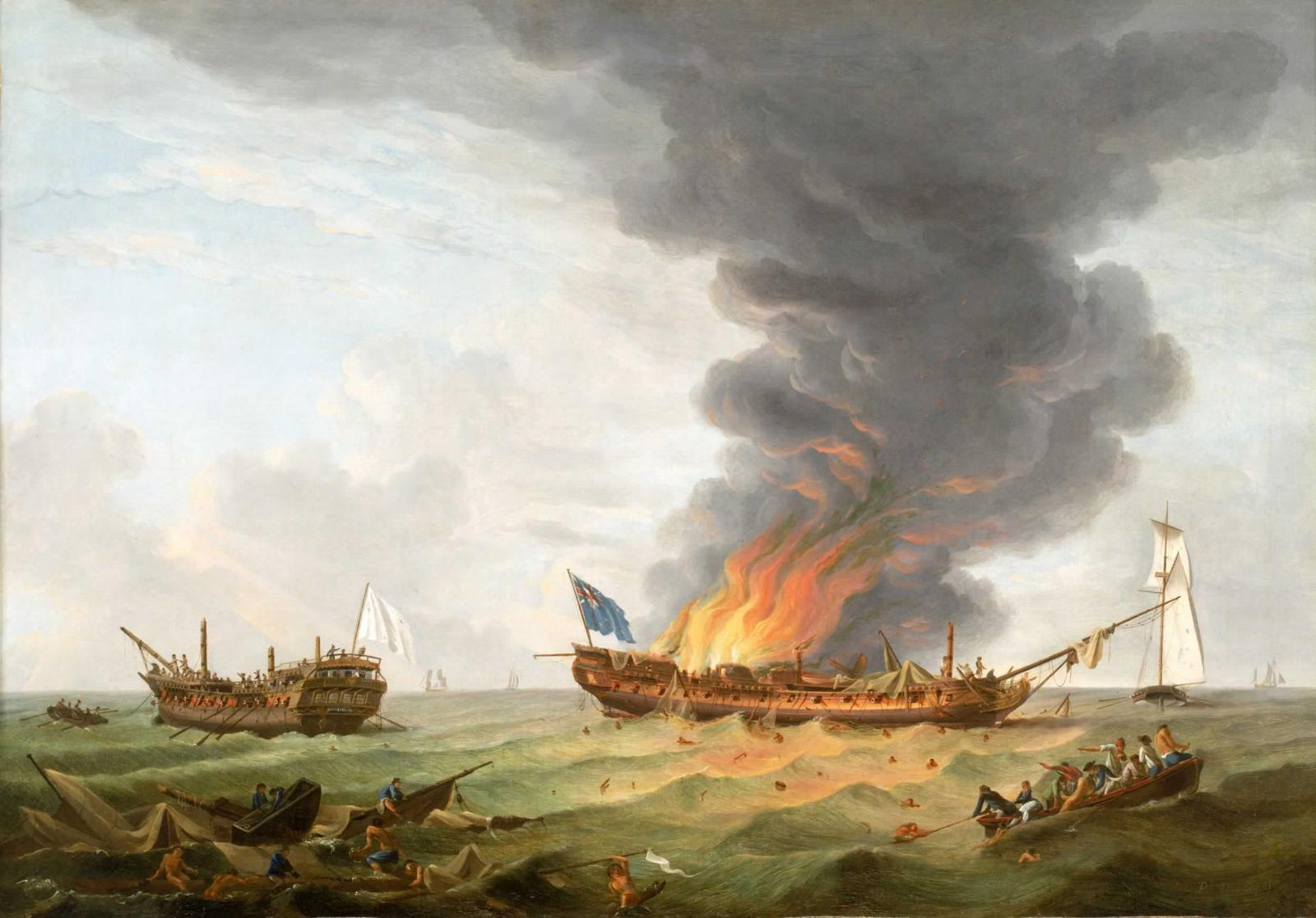
By Robert Dodd

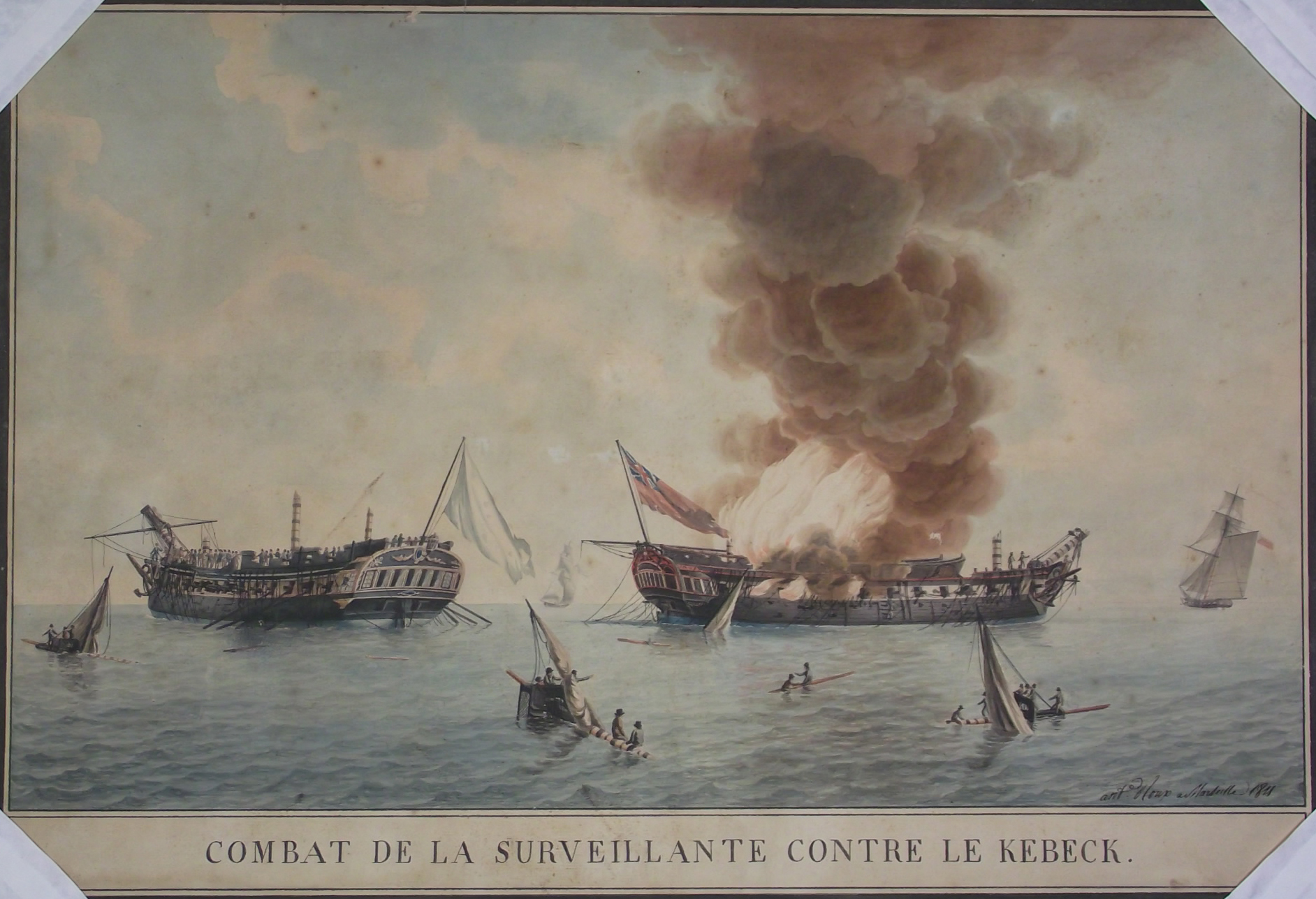
By Antoine Roux

=== End of the American war of Independence ===
On 11 June 1780, Surveillante arrived at Boston with the Expédition Particulière under Admiral Ternay, composed of 7 ships of the line, (Note: the 80-gun Duc de Bourgogne, under Ternay d'Arsac (admiral) and Médine (flag captain); the 74-gun Neptune, under Sochet Des Touches, and Conquérant, under La Grandière; and the 64-gun Provence under Lombard, Ardent under Bernard de Marigny, Jason under La Clocheterie and Éveillé under Le Gardeur de Tilly) 3 frigates (Note: Surveillante under Villeneuve Cillart, Amazone under La Pérouse, and Bellone) and 36 transports started arriving. From then on, Surveillante was attached to the Ternay's squadron as part of a frigate division under Captain Jean-Marie de Villeneuve Cillart, with his flag on Surveillante, and also comprising Amazone and Hermione, which had been at Boston since 27 April already.

On 19 February 1781, Surveillante, along with the 64-gun Éveillé, her sister-ship Gentille and the cutter Guèpe, captured HMS Romulus in Chesapeake Bay.

On 5 June 1781, as Surveillante was arriving at Saint-Domingue from America, she encountered the 48-gun frigate HMS Ulysses. A chase ensued and at 2130, Ulysses caught up with Surveillante. After 2 hours and a half of battle, the frigates broke the engagement.

On 24 October 1781, after the Siege of Yorktown, Surveillante brought Gontaut de Lauzun to France to bring the news of the victory. She arrived at Brest on 15 November.

Lloyd's List reported in August 1782 that a French vessel of 40 guns, a frigate, and a cutter had captured Tartar, of Bristol, Fraser, master, off the coast of Africa. Tartar had resisted and the capture only occurred after she had lost 10 men killed and a number of wounded. The French put Fraser and his surviving crews on Rose, of Liverpool, Stephenson, master, which the French had taken on about 9 June. The French made a cartel of Rose and she arrived at Bristol with some 200 men. Other reports state that the captors were a French frigate, sloop-of-war, and cutter, and that the casualties on Tartar amounted to three men killed and five wounded. A third source identified the frigate as Surveillante and the sloop as Ariel, and placed the capture as taking place of Cape Mount, West Africa. After her service as a cartel, Rose was decommissioned at Morlaix in November 1784.

In September Surveillante and Ariel captured the merchant vessel Grand Duc off the coast of Spain. The French navy briefly took Grand Duc into service before decommissioning her, striking her off, and selling her for £t 72,489 at Brest in 1783. (Note: Roche does not list Grand Duc.)

In summer 1783, along with the British frigate HMS Medea, she sailed to America to announce the Peace of Paris that ended the war between France and Great Britain.

=== French Revolution ===
In 1790, under Captain Sarcé, Surveillante was part of the 1st Division of the Brest squadron, under Du Chilleau de La Roche, along with the 74-gun Apollon and Jupiter, under Belugat.

In late 1793, under Captain Tréhouart-Beaulieu, she ferried Rear-Admiral Joseph Cambis from New York City to Lorient, as well as other passagers and despatches.

During the French Revolutionary Wars, she captured the packet ship Antelope in 1794. Surveillante participated in the Croisière du Grand Hiver, an unsuccessful sortie by the French fleet at Brest on 24 December 1794.

=== Fate ===
In December 1796, Surveillante took part in the Expédition d'Irlande. Badly damaged in a storm and not seaworthy enough to return to France, she was scuttled in Bantry Bay on the coast of County Cork, Ireland.

== Discovery of the wreck ==
After the 1979 Whiddy Island disaster, the wreck of Surveillante was found in 23 metres (75 ft) of water. The wreck is now a memorial, and a 1/6 model of the ship is now on display at Bantry. The wreck site has been investigated by maritime archaeologists from Ulster University and was found to be exceptionally well-preserved.
