= HMS Ardent (1764) =

Ship of the line of the Royal Navy

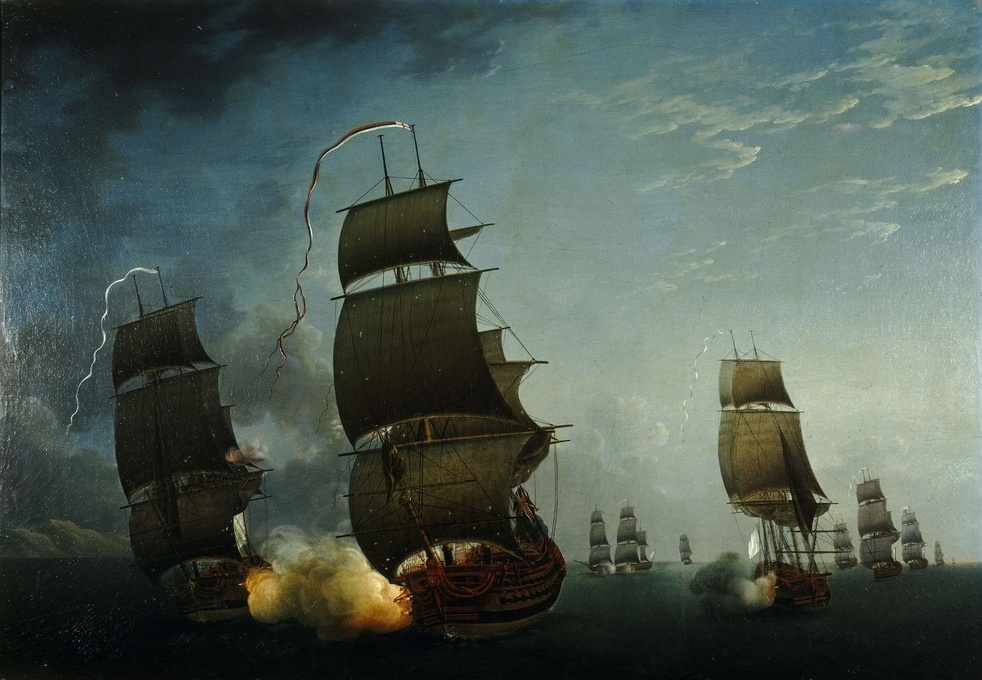
- Capture of HMS Ardent by the frigates Junon and Gentille

History

Great Britain
- Name: HMS Ardent
- Ordered: 16 December 1761
- Builder: Blades, Hull
- Laid down: 15 January 1762
- Launched: 13 August 1764
- Commissioned: October 1773
- Captured: 17 August 1779, by French Navy

France
- Name: Ardent
- Acquired: 1779
- Captured: 14 April 1782, by Royal Navy
- Notes: Participated in: Battle of the Saintes

Great Britain
- Name: HMS Ardent, later Tiger
- Acquired: 14 April 1782
- Renamed: 28 August 1783
- Fate: Sold out of the service, 10 June 1784

General characteristics
- Class & type: Ardent-class ship of the line
- Tons burthen: 137932/94 (bm)
- Length: 160 ft (49 m) (gundeck); 131 ft 8 in (40.13 m) (keel)
- Beam: 44 ft 4.5 in (13.526 m)
- Depth of hold: 19 ft (5.8 m)
- Propulsion: Sails
- Sail plan: Full-rigged ship
- Complement: 500 officers and men
- Armament: 64 guns: Gundeck: 26 × 24-pounders; Upper gundeck: 26 × 18-pounders; Quarterdeck: 10 × 4-pounders; Forecastle: 2 × 9-pounders

HMS Ardent was a 64-gun third-rate ship of the line of the Royal Navy. She was built by contract at Blaydes Yard in Hull according to a design by Sir Thomas Slade, and launched on 13 August 1764 as the first ship of the Ardent-class. She had a somewhat turbulent career, being captured by the French in the action of 17 August 1779, and then re-captured by Britain in 1782.

== Career ==
=== British career ===
The Ardent was first commissioned in October 1774 under Captain Sir Charles Douglas. In 1778, under the command of Captain George Keppel, she was with Admiral Lord Howe's squadron off New York, defending the town from the larger French fleet under the command of Admiral d'Estaing. The two forces engaged in an action off Rhode Island on 11 August, though both fleets were scattered by a storm over the following two days. On 23 December her tender captured a prize off Cape Henry and another on 19 January 1779. She returned home to Portsmouth and was paid off in January 1779.

June 1779 saw Ardent recommissioned under the command of Captain Phillip Boteler, sailing from Plymouth in August to join Sir Charles Hardy in the Channel. According to the ship's logs, as many as 4/5 of the crew were landmen, and neither Boteler nor the captain of the Marlborough, in whose company Ardent was sailing, were aware that a French fleet had put to sea. Ardent encountered a fleet two days after sailing, and after receiving the correct replies to the private signal, ran down to meet them. The fleet however was a Franco-Spanish fleet, somehow in possession of the Royal Navy signal code book, thus permitting the correct response to Ardent's signals.

With Ardent within range, the French frigate Junon fired two broadsides before raising her colours. Three further frigates, and the Spanish ship of the line Princesa joined the action shortly afterward. In response, Ardent offered sporadic and inaccurate return fire before striking her colours to the vastly superior enemy force. At his subsequent court martial Captain Boteler blamed his failure to return fire on an inadequate supply of gunpowder for Ardent′s cannons, a statement strongly denied by the ship's gunner Archibald Macintyre who presented evidence there was enough powder for fifty minutes of vigorous engagement. The court martial rejected Boteler's claims, finding instead that the inexperience of the crew was the principal cause of Ardent′s failure to respond to the attack. Boteler was dismissed from the Navy for his failure to adequately defend his ship.

=== French career ===
On 2 May 1780, she departed Brest with the 7-ship and 3-frigate Expédition Particulière under Admiral Ternay, escorting 36 transports carrying troops to support the Continental Army in the War of American Independence. The squadron comprised the 80-gun Duc de Bourgogne, under Ternay d'Arsac (admiral) and Médine (flag captain); the 74-gun Neptune, under Sochet Des Touches, and Conquérant, under La Grandière; and the 64-gun Provence under Lombard, Ardent under Bernard de Marigny, Jason under La Clocheterie and Éveillé under Le Gardeur de Tilly, and the frigates Surveillante under Villeneuve Cillart, Amazone under La Pérouse, and Bellone. Amazone, which constituted the vanguard of the fleet, arrived at Boston on 11 June 1780.

She took part in the Battle of the Chesapeake on 5 September 1781 under Captain Bernard de Marigny.

She took part in the Battle of the Saintes under Captain de Gouzillon. The British re-captured her on 14 April 1782 following the battle, and recommissioned her that month under Captain Richard Lucas. On 28 August 1783 the ship was renamed Tiger. She was sold out of the service in June 1784.
