= French ship Conquérant (1746) =

Ship of the line of the French Navy

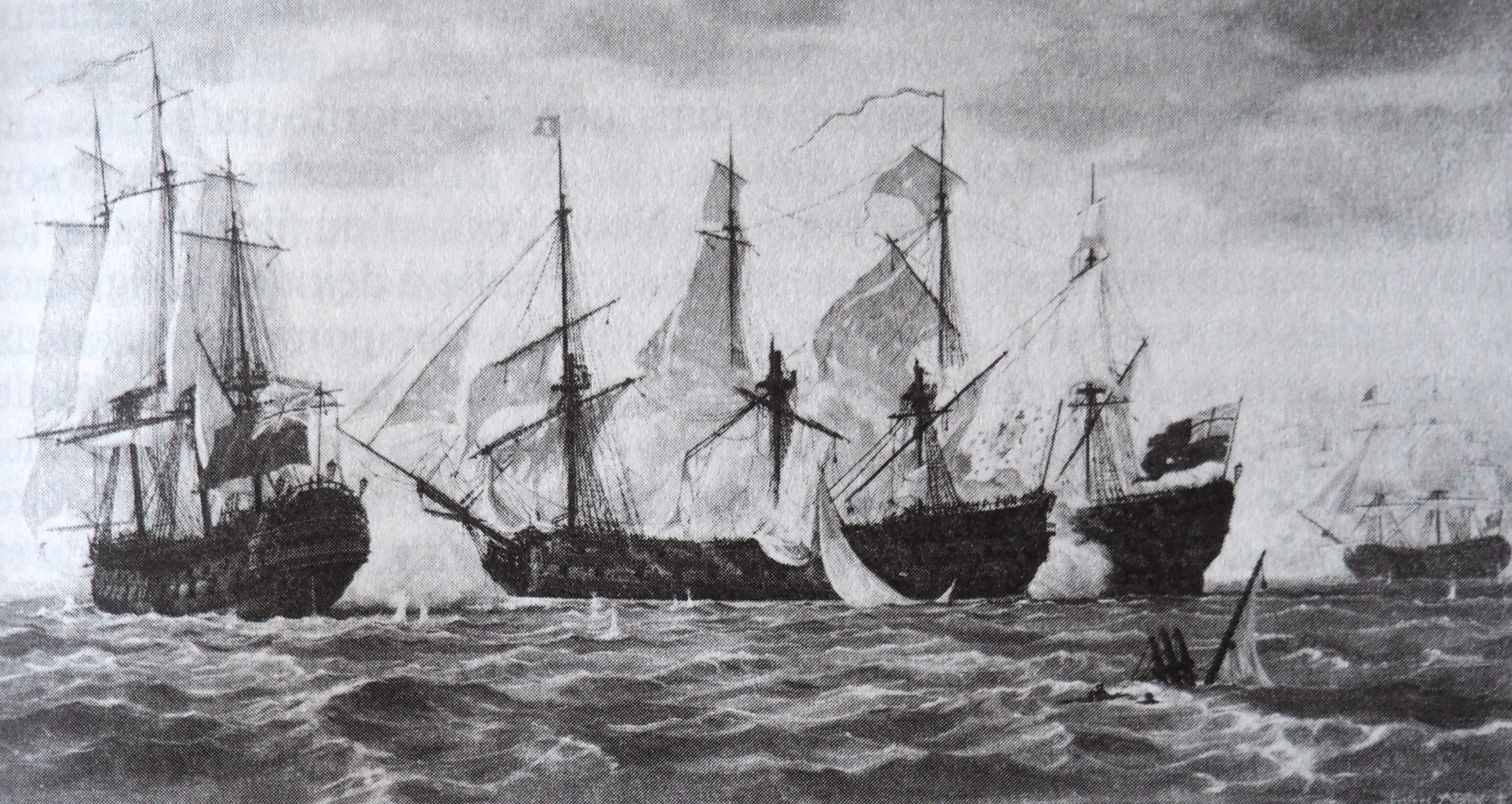
- Conquérant at the Battle of Cape Henry

History

France
- Name: Conquérant
- Namesake: "Conqueror"
- Ordered: 5 March 1743
- Builder: Toulon
- Laid down: February 1745
- Launched: 10 March 1746
- In service: January 1747
- Captured: 2 August 1798

Great Britain
- Name: Conquerant
- Acquired: 2 August 1798
- Fate: Broken up January 1803 Plymouth

General characteristics
- Class & type: Citoyen-class ship of the line
- Displacement: 2700 tonneaux
- Tons burthen: 1500 port tonneaux
- Length: 55.1 m (180 ft 9 in)
- Beam: 14.1 m (46 ft 3 in)
- Draught: 6.8 m (22 ft 4 in)
- Propulsion: Sail
- Armament: 74 guns: Lower battery: 28 × 36-pounders; Upper battery: 30 × 18-pounders; Forecastle and quarterdeck: 16 × 8-pounders

Conquérant (French pronunciation: [kɔ̃keʁɑ̃]) was originally designed and built by François Coulomb the Younger at Toulon from 1745 to 1747, as a modified version of the same constructor's Terrible built at the same dockyard from 1736–1740. In need of major repairs by early 1755, she was not employed throughout the Seven Years' War, after which she was formally taken out of service on 17 March 1764 and was rebuilt by Joseph-Louis Ollivier at Brest from January to December 1765 as a Citoyen-class 74-gun ship of the line of the French Navy.

== Career ==
In 1778, Conquérant was under Baron de Monteil, part of the Third division in the Blue squadron of the fleet under Orvilliers. She took part in the Battle of Ushant on 27 July 1778, where Monteil was wounded.

On 2 May 1780, she departed Brest with the 7-ship and 3-frigate Expédition Particulière under Admiral Ternay, escorting 36 transports carrying troops to support the Continental Army in the War of American Independence. The squadron comprised the 80-gun Duc de Bourgogne, under Ternay d'Arsac (admiral) and Médine (flag captain); the 74-gun Neptune, under Sochet Des Touches, and Conquérant, under La Grandière; and the 64-gun Provence under Lombard, Ardent under Bernard de Marigny, Jason under La Clocheterie and Éveillé under Le Gardeur de Tilly, and the frigates Surveillante under Villeneuve Cillart, Amazone under La Pérouse, and Bellone. Amazone, which constituted the vanguard of the fleet, arrived at Boston on 11 June 1780.

She took part in the Battle of the Nile, where she was armed with only 18- and 12-pounders, and crewed by a mere 400 men, under captain Dalbarade. Second ship in the vanguard of her line, Conquérant sustained fire from the passing British ships sailing to attack the centre of the French fleet. She was particularly targeted by HMS Audacious and HMS Goliath, who reduced her to a hulk before 19:00. Immobilised, hopelessly overgunned and undermanned, her captain mortally wounded, Conquérant struck her colours and was seized by a boarding party from Audacious.

She was subsequently recommissioned in the Royal Navy under the same name.
