= Expédition Particulière =

1780–1782 French expedition of the American Revolutionary War

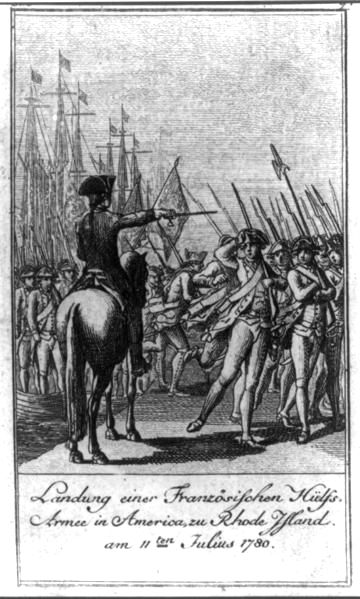
Landing of a French auxiliary army in Newport, Rhode Island on 11 July 1780, under the command of Comte de Rochambeau

The Special Expedition (French: Expédition Particulière) was an expeditionary force deployed by France to North America to support the United States against Great Britain during the American Revolutionary War. Arriving at Newport, Rhode Island on 11 July 1780 under the leadership of the Comte de Rochambeau, it numbered up to 5,500 troops and played a decisive role in the final battles of the war. Another 2,500 troops were intended to join the force but could not escape the British blockade of Brest, France.

After remaining inactive for almost a year, Rochambeau marched his troops south to rendezvous with George Washington's Continental Army for a planned attack on New York City. At Rochambeau's urging, Washington abandoned the operation and both forces were marched to Virginia to join the French fleet of Admiral François de Grasse in trapping British Lieutenant General Charles Cornwallis's army at Yorktown; the subsequent Franco-American siege ended in Cornwallis surrendering in October 1781, which hastened negotiations towards a peace treaty ending the war.

== Background ==
France had been in contact with American Patriots as early as 1774 and by 1776 was sending large amounts of covert financial aid and military supplies to their cause. Following the loss of a British army during the Saratoga campaign of 1777, France signed a Treaty of Alliance in February 1778 recognising American independence. The subsequent Franco-American alliance legitimised the American cause while securing direct French aid in the war. Shortly thereafter, a French fleet under Charles Hector, comte d'Estaing sailed out to coordinate with American allies against the British, with the aim of helping bring a swift end to the war.

The initial attempts to seek victory were beset by problems. An operation against Newport miscarried in 1778; the following year, the Franco-American siege of Savannah ended in defeat. D'Estaing and his ships then sailed for home, with relations between the allies severely strained.

== Expeditionary force ==
On 2 May 1780, Admiral Ternay d'Arsac departed Brest with a seven-ship and three-frigate squadron, escorting 36 transports carrying troops to support the Continental Army in the American Revolutionary War. The squadron comprised the 80-gun Duc de Bourgogne, under Ternay d'Arsac (admiral) and Médine (flag captain); the 74-gun Neptune, under Sochet Des Touches, and Conquérant, under La Grandière; and the 64-gun Provence under Lombard, Ardent under Bernard de Marigny, Jason under La Clocheterie and Éveillé under Le Gardeur de Tilly, and the frigates Surveillante under Villeneuve Cillart, Amazone under La Pérouse, and Bellone. Amazone, which constituted the vanguard of the fleet, arrived at Boston on 11 June 1780.

=== Organization ===
The Special Expedition contained four regiments of foot:

- Régiment de Bourbonnais
- Régiment de Soissonnais
- Régiment de Saintonge
- Régiment de Royal–Deux–Ponts

One battalion of artillery:

- Second Battalion, Régiment d'Auxonne

One combined-arms legion:

- Lauzun's Legion

== Yorktown campaign ==
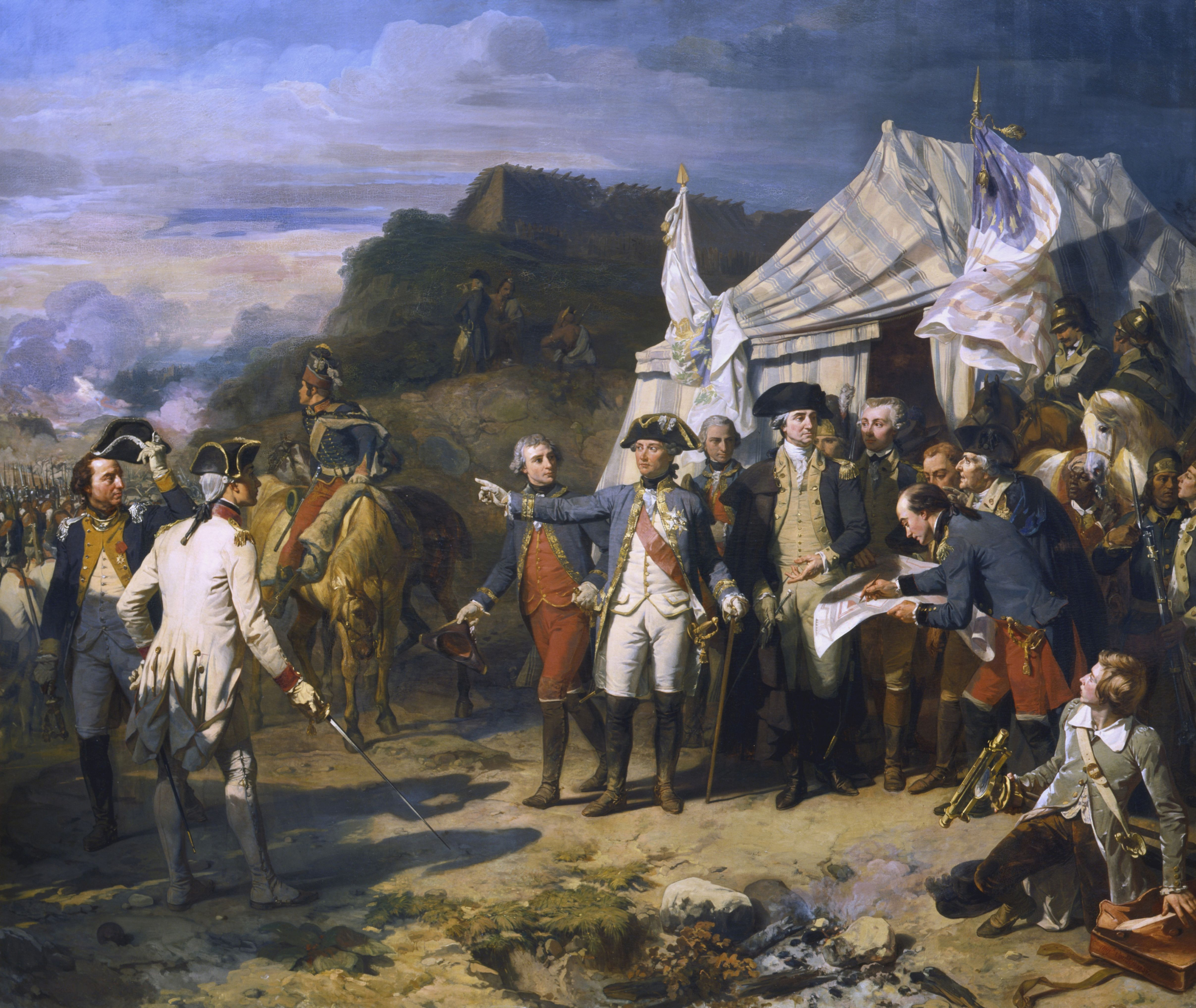
Siège de Yorktown by Auguste Couder, c.1836. Rochambeau and Washington giving their last orders before the battle.

In July 1781, Rochambeau's army left Rhode Island and marched across Connecticut to join Washington's army on the Hudson River at Dobbs Ferry, New York. From there the combined forces marched overland to Virginia. During this time, Admiral de Grasse managed to defeat a British fleet sent from New York City to evacuate British General Charles Cornwallis at the Battle of the Chesapeake on 5 September, trapping Cornwallis on the Yorktown peninsula. On September 22, Rochambeau and Washington combined forces with those of the Marquis de Lafayette and began the siege of Yorktown. The siege ended with the surrender of Cornwallis on 19 October 1781.

== Departure to the West Indies ==
Rochambeau's force wintered in Virginia. The following year they moved north towards New England. Washington again tried to interest Rochambeau in an attack on New York City, Charleston, or Canada, but the Frenchman rejected the proposals. Orders instead arrived for his expedition to go to the West Indies, and in late 1782 it sailed from Boston for Port-au-Prince. However, by then the Peace of Paris had been agreed, and the planned 1783 campaign in the Caribbean never took place. In late April the French sailed for home, reaching Brest and Toulon in June and July 1783.

== Legacy ==
The expedition has been described as the only substantial force of foreign allies ever to serve on United States soil for an extended period. The Washington–Rochambeau Revolutionary Route honors the march from north to south.
