= French ship Neptune (1778) =

Ship of the line of the French Navy

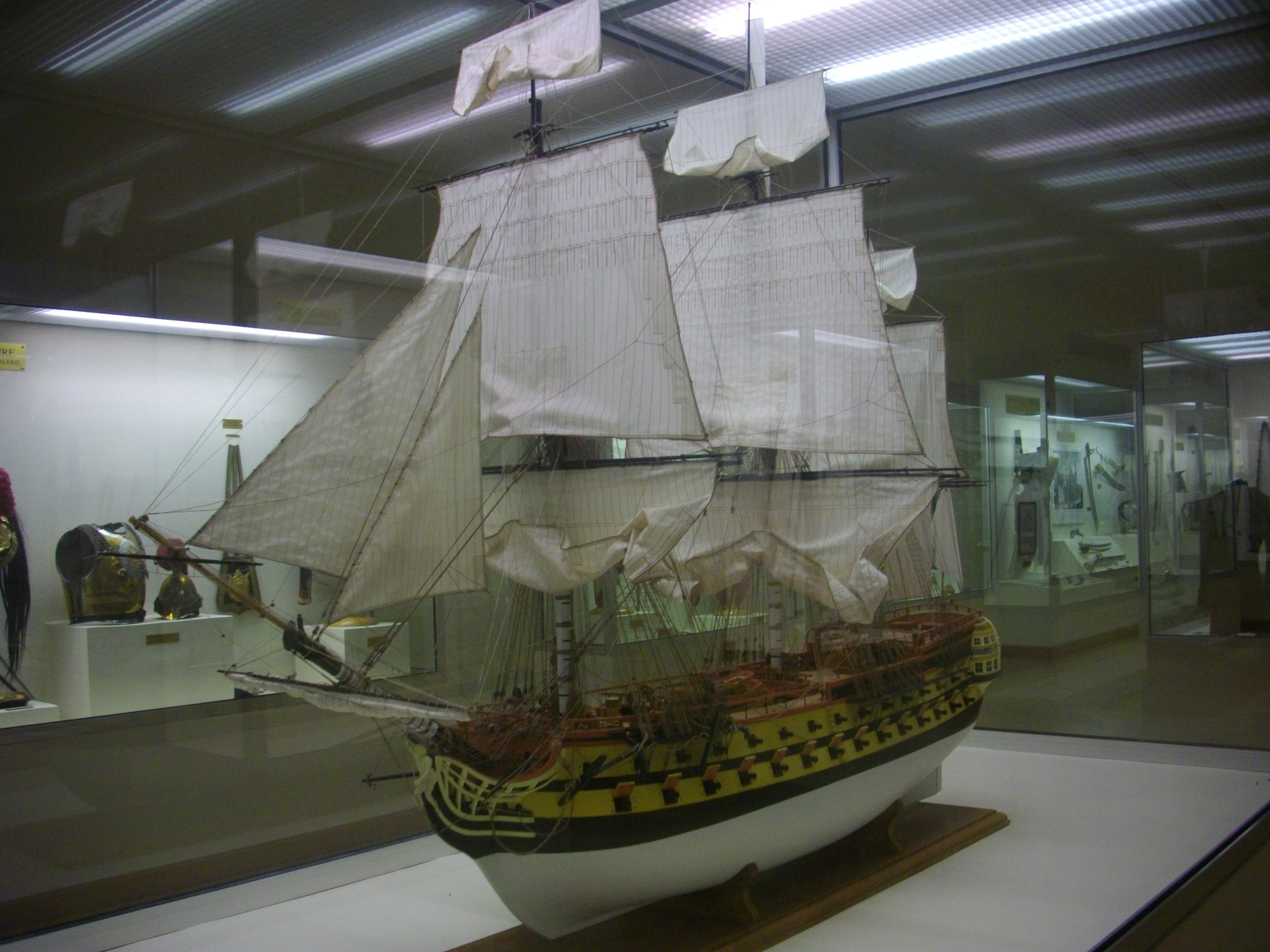
- Ship model of Neptune

History

France
- Name: Neptune
- Launched: 20 August 1778
- Fate: Wrecked 28 January 1795

General characteristics
- Displacement: 2,856 tonneaux
- Tons burthen: 1,500 port tonneaux
- Length: 54.7 m (179 ft)
- Beam: 14.3 m (47 ft)
- Draught: 6.7 m (22 ft)
- Armament: 74 guns: Lower gundeck: 28 × 36-pounder long guns; Upper gundeck: 30 × 24-pounder long guns; Forecastle and Quarter deck: 16 × 8-pounder long guns; 4 × 36-pounder carronades

Neptune was a 74-gun ship of the line of the French Navy.

== Career ==
Neptune captured a 30-gun British privateer named Hercules on 28 October 1778.

On 2 May 1780, she departed Brest with a 7-ship and 3-frigate Expédition Particulière under Admiral Ternay, escorting 36 transports carrying troops to support the Continental Army in the War of American Independence. The squadron comprised the 80-gun Duc de Bourgogne, under Ternay d'Arsac (admiral) and Médine (flag captain); the 74-gun Neptune, under Sochet Des Touches, and Conquérant, under La Grandière; and the 64-gun Provence under Lombard, Ardent under Bernard de Marigny, Jason under La Clocheterie and Éveillé under Le Gardeur de Tilly, and the frigates Surveillante under Villeneuve Cillart, Amazone under La Pérouse, and Bellone. Amazone, which constituted the vanguard of the fleet, arrived at Boston on 11 June 1780.

In 1782, she was part of de Grasse's squadron. Neptune engaged HMS Repulse and HMS Canada in the Battle of the Saintes, under Renaud d'Aleins.

Decommissioned, she was reactivated to take part in the Bataille du 13 prairial an 2 and in the Croisière du Grand Hiver. She ran aground and was destroyed on 28 January 1795, with the loss of 50.
