= HMS Argonaut (1782) =

Ship of the line of the Royal Navy

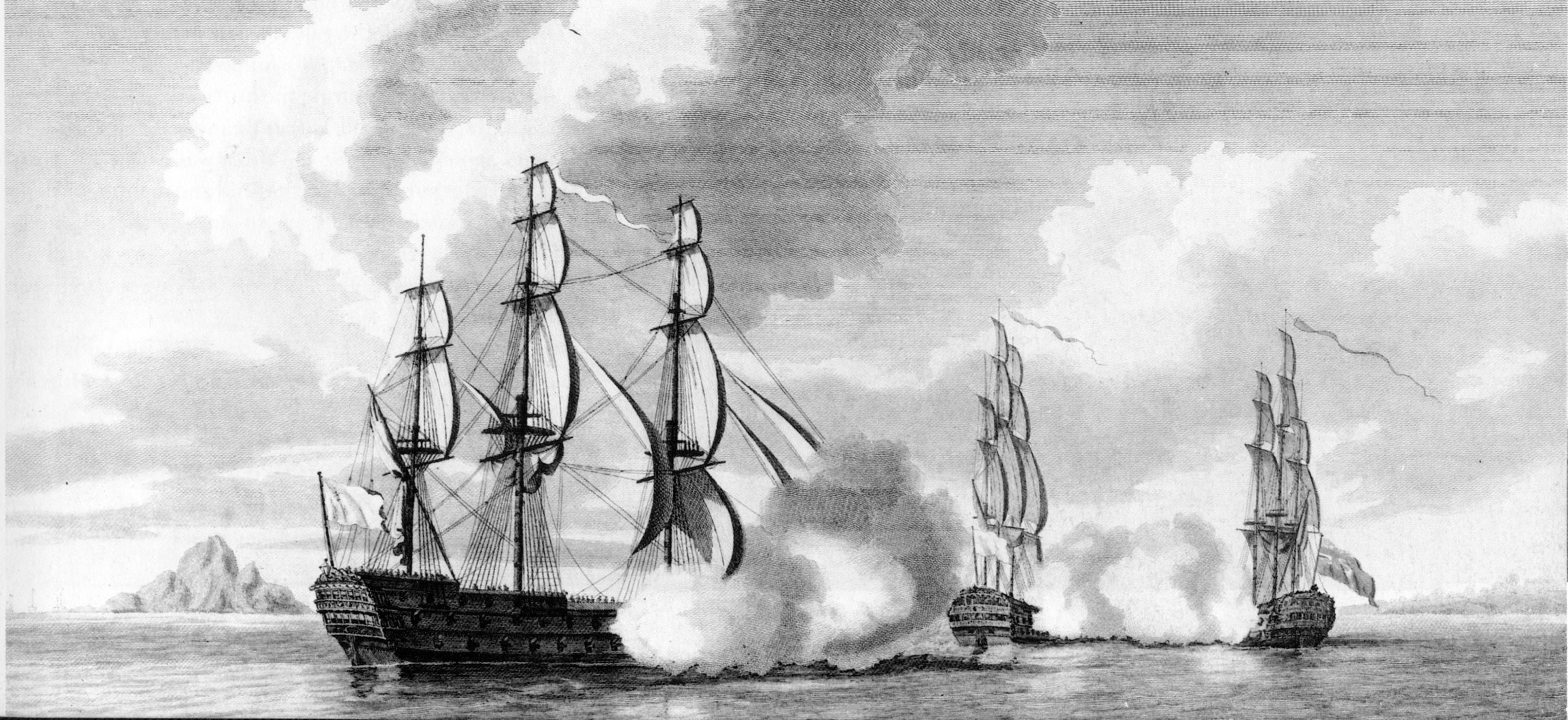
- Jason (second from left) at the Battle of the Mona Passage

History

France
- Name: Jason
- Launched: 13 February 1779
- Captured: 19 April 1782, by Royal Navy

Great Britain
- Name: HMS Argonaut
- Acquired: 19 April 1782
- Fate: Broken up, 1831

General characteristics
- Class & type: 64-gun third rate ship of the line
- Tons burthen: 145177/94 (bm)
- Length: 166 ft 4 in (50.70 m) (gundeck)
- Beam: 44 ft 8 1/2 in (13.6 m)
- Depth of hold: 19 ft 1 in (5.82 m)
- Propulsion: Sails
- Sail plan: Full-rigged ship
- Armament: 64 guns of various weights of shot

HMS Argonaut was a 64-gun third rate ship of the line, in Royal Navy service during the French Revolutionary Wars and the American Revolution. Launched in 1779 as the French ship Jason, she was captured by the British in 1782 and commissioned by them in the same year. After active service against the French, she was converted to a hospital ship in 1804 and permanently moored off Chatham Dockyard. Argonaut was removed from navy service in 1828 and broken up in 1831.

== Career ==
=== French career ===
On 2 May 1780, she departed Brest with the 7-ship and 3-frigate Expédition Particulière under Admiral Ternay, escorting 36 transports carrying troops to support the Continental Army in the War of American Independence. The squadron comprised the 80-gun Duc de Bourgogne, under Ternay d'Arsac (admiral) and Médine (flag captain); the 74-gun Neptune, under Sochet Des Touches, and Conquérant, under La Grandière; and the 64-gun Provence under Lombard, Ardent under Bernard de Marigny, Jason under La Clocheterie and Éveillé under Le Gardeur de Tilly, and the frigates Surveillante under Villeneuve Cillart, Amazone under La Pérouse, and Bellone. Amazone, which constituted the vanguard of the fleet, arrived at Boston on 11 June 1780.

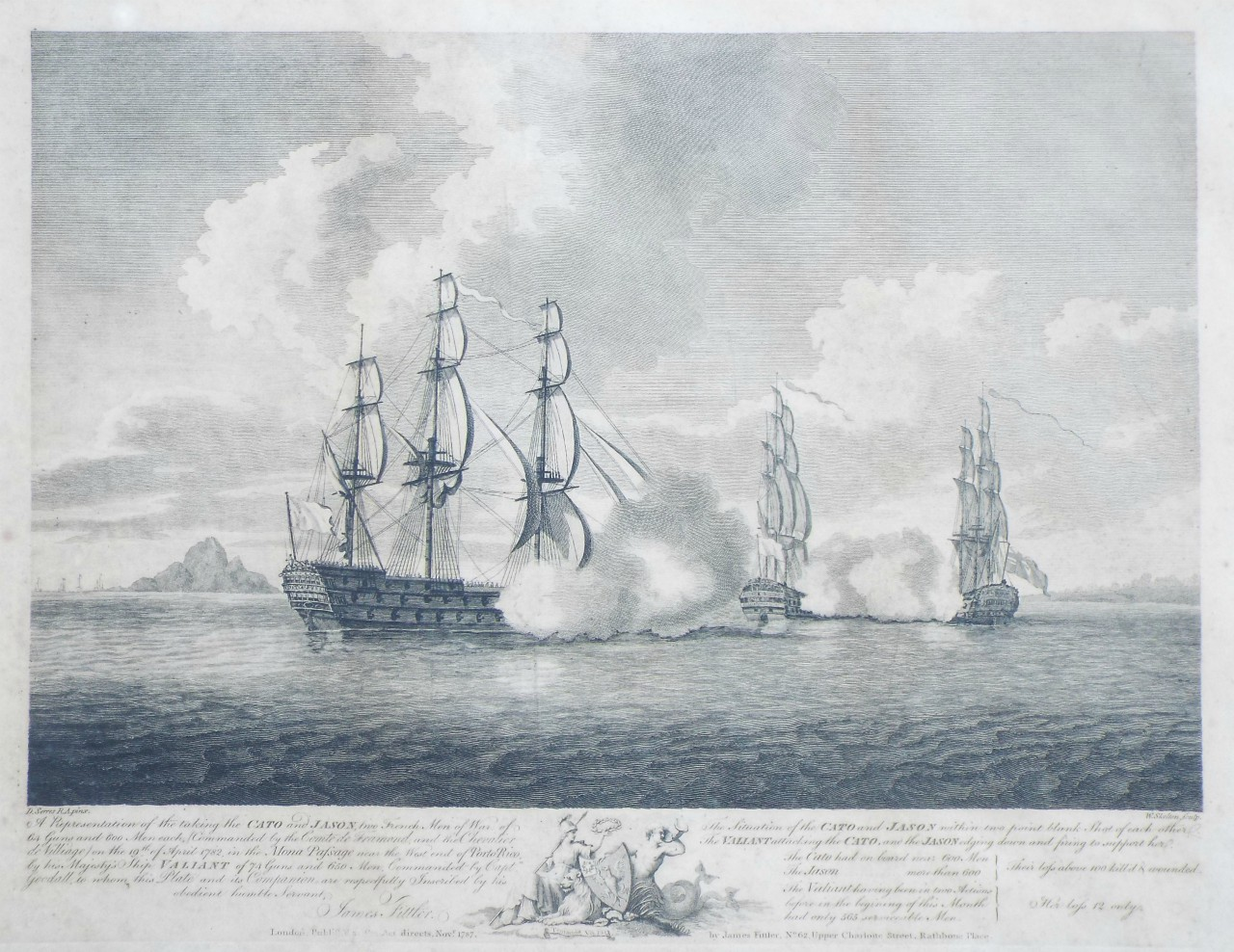
The taking of the Cato and Jason by HMS Valiant on 19 April 1782, in the Mona Passage, near the west end of Porto Rico

=== British career ===
On 8 January 1795, while under the command of Captain Alexander John Ball she captured the French Republican warship Esperance on the North America Station. Esperance was armed with 22 guns (4 and 6-pounders), and had a crew of 130 men. She was under the command of Lieutenant de Vaisseau De St. Laurent and had been out 56 days from Rochfort, bound for the Chesapeake. Argonaut shared the prize money with Captain Robert Murray's HMS Oiseau.

The French ambassador to the United States registered a complaint with the President of the United States that Argonaut, by entering Lynnhaven bay, either before she captured Esperance or shortly thereafter, had violated a treaty between France and the United States. The French also accused the British of having brought Esperance into Lynnhaven for refitting for a cruise. The President passed the complaint to the Secretary of State, who forwarded the complaint to the Governor of Virginia. The Governor inquired into the matter of the British Consul at Virginia. The British Consul replied that the capture had taken place some 10 leagues off shore. The weather had forced Argonaut and her prize to shelter within the Chesapeake for some days, but that they had left as soon as practicable. Furthermore, Argonaut had paroled her French prisoners when she came into Lynnhaven and if had entered American territorial waters solely to parole her French prisoners no one would have thought that objectionable. The authorities in Virginia took a number of depositions but ultimately nothing further came from the matter.

Because she was captured in good order and sailed well, Rear Admiral George Murray, the British commander in chief of the North American station, put a British crew aboard and sent Esperance out on patrol with Lynx on 31 January.

On 3 August 1795, Argonaut captured the ship Anna.

== Fate ==
Argonaut was placed on harbour service in 1797, and eventually broken up in 1831.
