= French ship Jason =

At least three ships of the French Navy have been named Jason:

- French ship Jason (1704) launched in 1704 and deleted in 1720
- French ship Jason (1724) launched in 1724 and captured by the Royal Navy in 1747
- French ship Jason (1779) launched in 1779 and captured by the Royal Navy in 1782
