= Nicolas-Louis de Durfort =

French Navy officer of the War of American Independence

Nicolas-Louis de Durfort was a French Navy officer. He served in the War of American Independence.

== Biography ==
Durfort joined the Navy as a Garde-Marine on 23 March 1756. He was promoted to Lieutenant on 1 May 1763.

In 1772, he commanded the 20-gun xebec Séduisant. In 1776, he was given command of the 18-gun corvette Flèche, part of the squadron under Du Chaffault.

Durfort was promoted to Captain on 4 April 1777, and commanded the 26-gun frigate Atalante, attached to the Eastern Mediterranean squadron.

In 1780, he commanded the 74-gun Scipion.

He commanded the 80-gun Bourgogne at the Battle of Cape Henry on 16 March 1781.

He was promoted to Chef de Division on 1 May 1786, and given command of the 7th Squadron.
