= French corvette Flèche (1768) =

History

France
- Name: Flèche
- Builder: Toulon
- Laid down: May 1768
- Launched: 19 October 1768
- Captured: 21 May 1794

Great Britain
- Name: HMS Fleche
- Acquired: May 1794 by capture
- Commissioned: May 1794
- Fate: Wrecked 12 November 1795

General characteristics
- Type: Corvette
- Tons burthen: 278 (bm)
- Length: Overall: 92 ft 9 in (28.3 m); Keel: 74 ft 4 in (22.7 m)
- Beam: 26 ft 6 in (8.1 m)
- Depth of hold: 11 ft 0 in (3.4 m)
- Propulsion: Sails
- Complement: French service: 120 (peace), and 200 (war); British service: 75
- Armament: French service: initially 18 × 6-pounder guns; later 14 × 6-pounder guns; British service: 18 × 18-pounder carronades

Flèche was a French corvette built by Louis-Hilarion Chapelle (cadet) and launched at Toulon, France in 1768. The British captured her at the Fall of Bastia in May 1794 and commissioned her into the Royal Navy under her existing name. She observed the naval Battle of Hyères Islands, but then was wrecked in 1795.

== French service and capture ==
Flèche was a French corvette built by Louis-Hilarion Chapelle (cadet) and launched at Toulon, France on 19 October 1768. In 1776, she was under Lieutenant Durfort, part of the squadron under Du Chaffault.

Flèche was substantially refitted in 1779–1780. By 1786 she was the most elderly surviving corvette.

In the early 1790s she was stationed at Smyrna. In April 1790, while under the command of major de vaisseau chevalier de Lestang-Parade, she sailed on a mission to Saloniki, and then to Largentière. She then returned to Toulon via Paros. Between 12 May and June 1792, while under the command of lieutenant de vaisseau Blanquet Du Chayla, she sailed from Tunis southward via Cerigo and Largentière.

The British captured Flèche on 21 May 1794 at the fall of Bastia. The French proposed in the articles of capitulation that the French Republic retain Flèche and a pink to transport the garrison, such civilians as wished to accompany them, and some timber, to France. The British refused, simply stating that they would provide any necessary transport.

== British service and fate ==
The Royal Navy commissioned her as HMS Fleche under Commander John Gore upon her capture. He fitted her out and sailed her to Malta where he negotiated with the Grand Master of the Knights Hospitaller Emmanuel de Rohan-Polduc for seamen, supplies, and the like. On 13 September Gore was a witness at the trial of Lieutenant William Walker, commander of the hired armed cutter Rose, on charges that Walker had accepted money from merchants at Bastia to convoy their vessels to Leghorn, where the court-martial took place. Walker was acquitted. Gore received promotion to post captain on 14 November 1794.

Commander Henry Hotham replaced Gore, but then received promotion on 13 January 1795 to Mignonne. Lieutenant Thomas Boys replaced Gore in 1795, on Boys' promotion to commander on 30 January 1795.

Under Boys, Fleche was one of the vessels that alerted the British fleet to the whereabouts of the French fleet in the run up to the Battle of Hyères Islands, which was fought on 13 July 1795 off the Hyères Islands, a group of islands off the French Mediterranean coast, about 25 kilometres (16 mi) east of Toulon. Fleche observed the battle from a distance. Lieutenant Charles Came replaced Boys.

Fleche was wrecked in the bay of San Fiorenzo in November 1795, but without loss of life. As she was entering the port during the night she grounded. The next day efforts to lighten her failed to free her and her crew left. By morning it was clear that she had capsized. The subsequent court martial castigated Came for his "great want of attention".
