= Mariot Arbuthnot =

Royal Navy Admiral of the Blue (1711–1794)

Admiral Mariot Arbuthnot
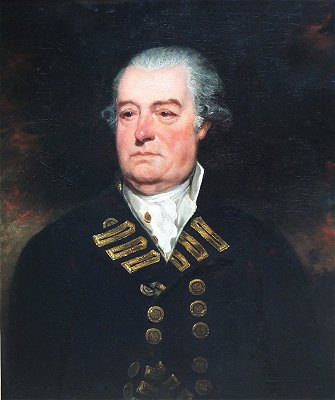
- Born: 1711; Weymouth, Dorset, England
- Died: 31 January 1794 (aged 82–83); London, England
- Relatives: John Arbuthnot (uncle)
- Military career
- Allegiance: Great Britain
- Branch: Royal Navy
- Rank: Admiral of the Blue
- Conflicts: Battle of Cape Henry

Admiral of the Blue Mariot Arbuthnot (1711 – 31 January 1794) was a Royal Navy officer who served in the American War of Independence.

== Early life ==
A native of Weymouth, Dorset, in England, Arbuthnot was the son of Robert Arbuthnot and Sarah, née Bury. Robert's father was the son of the Rev. Robert Arbuthnot, Presbyterian minister of Crichton & Cranston. Mariot Arbuthnot entered the Royal Navy in the late 1720s, became a lieutenant in 1739, and commander in 1746. In 1746 he was commander of the sloop HMS Jamaica, which captured two French privateers while employed as a cruiser in the channel. He was appointed post captain in 1747. On 22 June 1747 Arbuthnot became captain of the frigate HMS Surprize. Shortly afterwards he became captain of the Triton.

== Seven Years' War ==
In 1757 he became chief officer of the Garland. In 1759, during the Seven Years' War, he commanded the Portland, one of the ships employed under Commodore Robert Duff in the blockade of Quiberon Bay, and was present at the total defeat of the French on 20 November. Towards the end of the war he commanded HMS Oxford. In 1770 he was made captain of HMS Terrible.

== American War of Independence ==
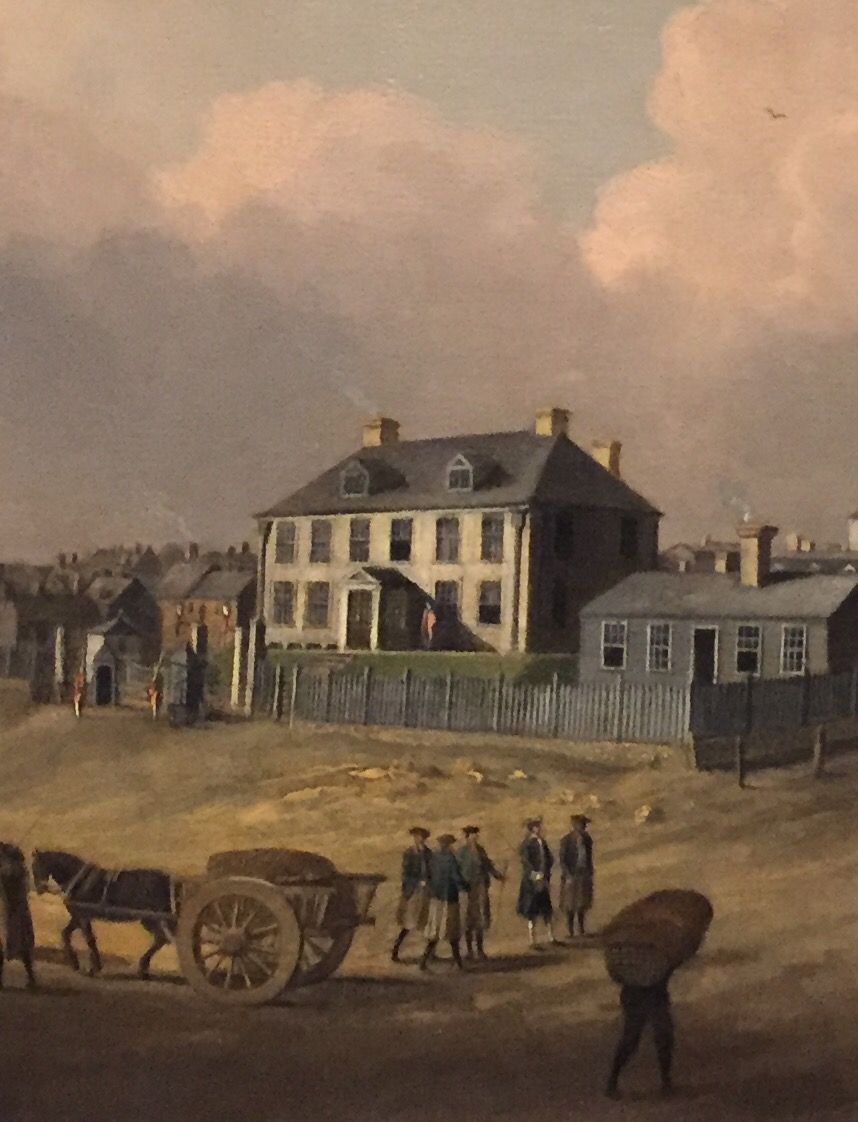
Governor Arbuthnot's residence (built 1749). (Located on the site of Province House, which still is furnished with his Nova Scotia Council table)

From 1775 to 1778, he was Resident Commissioner of the Navy, Halifax Nova Scotia. He was Lieutenant Governor of Nova Scotia, 1776–78. He was replaced in this role by Richard Hughes. It may have been about then that an armed schooner was named Arbuthnot after him. On 19 March 1779, he was made Vice-Admiral of the Blue, and on 2 May 1779 took command of HMS Europa. That same year he took up his appointment as commander-in-chief on the North American Station. Soon after arriving at his destination, he was blockaded in New York City harbour by the French fleet under Count d'Estaing.

In December 1779, Arbuthnot conveyed the troops of Sir Henry Clinton to Charleston, South Carolina, and cooperated with him in laying siege to that city. The surrender document signed by prominent citizens was addressed to him and Clinton. On 26 September 1780 he was promoted to Vice-Admiral of the White. On 13 March 1781, he fought the French Newport squadron, at the Battle of Cape Henry, before returning to England.

== Later life ==
He advanced by seniority to become, on 1 February 1793, Admiral of the Blue. He died in London the following year, leaving two sons, John and Charles.

That he was ignorant of the discipline of his profession was proved by his altercation with Sir George Rodney; that he was destitute of even a rudimentary knowledge of naval tactics was shown by his absurd conduct of the Battle of Cape Henry; and, for the rest, he appears in contemporary stories (cf. Morning Chronicle, 18 May 1781) as a coarse, blustering, foul-mouthed bully, and, in history, as a sample of the extremity to which the maladministration of Lord Sandwich had reduced the British Navy.

Admiral Arbuthnot was the nephew of Dr. John Arbuthnot, the satirist and mathematician.

Government offices
Preceded by Michael Francklin	Lieutenant Governor of Nova Scotia; 1776–1778; Served under: Francis Legge	Succeeded by Sir Richard Hughes
Military offices
Preceded by John Byron	Commander-in-Chief, North American Station; 1779–1781	Succeeded by Sir Thomas Graves
