= Rémi Monaque =

French Navy officer and historian

- Born: 24 August 1936 (age 89)
- Branch: French Navy
- Rank: Counter admiral
- Alma mater: École navale
- Other work: Une histoire de la marine de guerre française

Rémi Léon Louis Marie Joseph Monaque (b. 24 August 1936) is a French historian and former naval officer.

== Biography ==
Monaque joined the École navale in 1955, and was promoted to Ensign 2nd class on 1 October 1956, and to Ensign 1st class on 1 October 1958. By then a ship-of-the-line lieutenant, Monaque took command of the River-class frigate Découverte in April 1971. On 21 May 1976, he was promoted to Lieutenant-Commander and was given command of the T52-type frigate Béarnais.

He later captained the Georges Leygues-class frigate Jean de Vienne. Transferred ashore, he worked at the Navy General staff, in the Ministry of Defence and at the École supérieure de guerre navale. Monaque retired from the Navy with the rank of counter admiral after a 37-year career. He has authored several books about the French Navy of the 18th and 19th centuries, especially the French Imperial Navy.

== Sources and references ==
Publications

- Monaque, Rémi (1995). L'Ecole de guerre navale (in French). Vincennes: Service historique de la marine.
- Monaque, Rémi (2000). Latouche-Tréville, l'amiral qui défiait Nelson (in French). Paris.
- Monaque, Rémi (2000). Les aventures de Louis-René de Latouche-Tréville, compagnon de La Fayette et commandant de l'Hermione (in French). Paris: SPM.
- Monaque, Rémi (2005). Trafalgar (in French). Paris: Tallandier. ISBN 9782286018696. Grand Prix de la Fondation Napoléon.
- Monaque, Rémi (2009). Suffren - Un destin inachevé (in French). Paris: Tallandier. ISBN 9782847343335.
- Monaque, Rémi (2016). Une histoire de la marine de guerre française (in French). Paris: Perrin. ISBN 978-2-262-03715-4., Grand prix de l'Académie de marine 2017
