= Charles-Marie de La Grandière =

French Navy officer of the War of American Independence

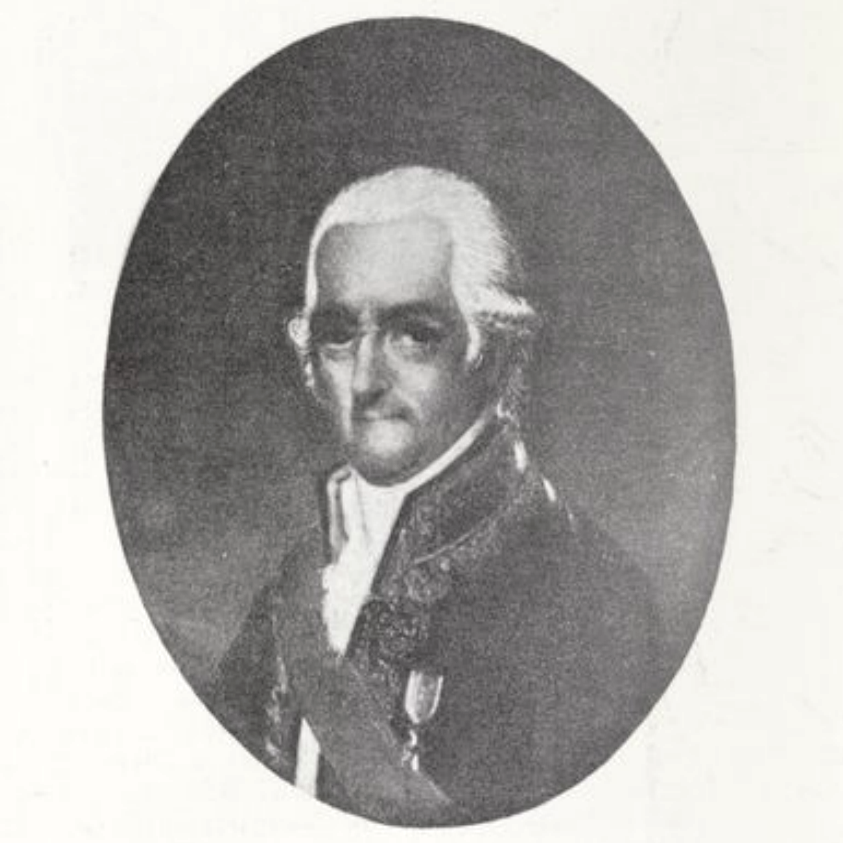
- Born: 17 February 1729 Brest, France
- Died: 22 March 1812 (aged 83) Rennes, France
- Branch: French Navy
- Rank: contre-amiral
- Conflicts: War of American Independence

Charles-Marie de La Grandière (Brest, 17 February 1729 — Rennes, 22 March 1812) was a French Navy officer. He served in the War of American Independence.

== Biography ==
La Grandière was born to the family of a Navy Lieutenant. He joined the Navy as a volunteer on Saint-Michel in 1741, and became a Garde-Marine in 1745. He was promoted to Ensign in 1751.

He was promoted to Lieutenant in 1757. He was promoted to Captain in 1772. He took part in the Battle of Ushant on 27 July 1778, where he commanded the 64-gun Indien. He captained the 74-gun Conquérant as part of the Expédition Particulière. He took part in the Battle of Cape Henry on 16 March 1781, where Conquérant was especially exposed and sustained severe damage to her masts. He also took part in the Battle of the Saintes on 12 April 1782.

La Grandière was admitted in the Society of the Cincinnati for his participation in the War of American Independence.

He was promoted to Brigadier in 1782, and to Chef d'Escadre in 1784. In 1785, he was made a Commander in the Order of Saint Louis.

In 1791, he was made commander of the squadron of Brest.

On 1 January 1792, La Grandière was promoted to contre-amiral. He retired in 1805.

== Sources and references ==
Notes

Citations

Bibliography

- Contenson, Ludovic (1934). La Société des Cincinnati de France et la guerre d'Amérique (1778-1783). Paris: éditions Auguste Picard. OCLC 7842336.
- Lacour-Gayet, Georges (1910). La marine militaire de la France sous le règne de Louis XVI. Paris: Honoré Champion.
- Levot, Prosper (1852). Biographie bretonne: recueil de notices sur tous les Bretons qui se sont fait un nom (in French). Vol. 2. Caudran.
- Troude, Onésime-Joachim (1867). Batailles navales de la France (in French). Vol. 2. Challamel ainé.
- Roche, Jean-Michel (2005). Dictionnaire des bâtiments de la flotte de guerre française de Colbert à nos jours. Vol. 1. Group Retozel-Maury Millau. ISBN 978-2-9525917-0-6. OCLC 165892922.
