= Armand Le Gardeur de Tilly =

French Navy officer of the War of American Independence

- Born: 14 January 1733; Rochefort, France
- Died: 1 January 1813; La Salle, France
- Service / branch: French Navy
- Rank: Vice-Admiral
- Battles / wars: War of American Independence; Battle of Cape Henry; Battle of the Saintes

Armand Le Gardeur de Tilly (Note: Contenson calls him "Arnaud", apparently erroneously.) (Rochefort, 14 January 1733 — La Salle, near Champagne, Charente-Maritime, 1 January 1812) was a French Navy officer. He served in the War of American Independence.

== Biography ==
Le Gardeur de Tilly was the first son born to the family of a Navy captain.

He joined the Navy as a Garde-Marine on 6 July 1750. He was promoted to Lieutenant on 1 May 1763.

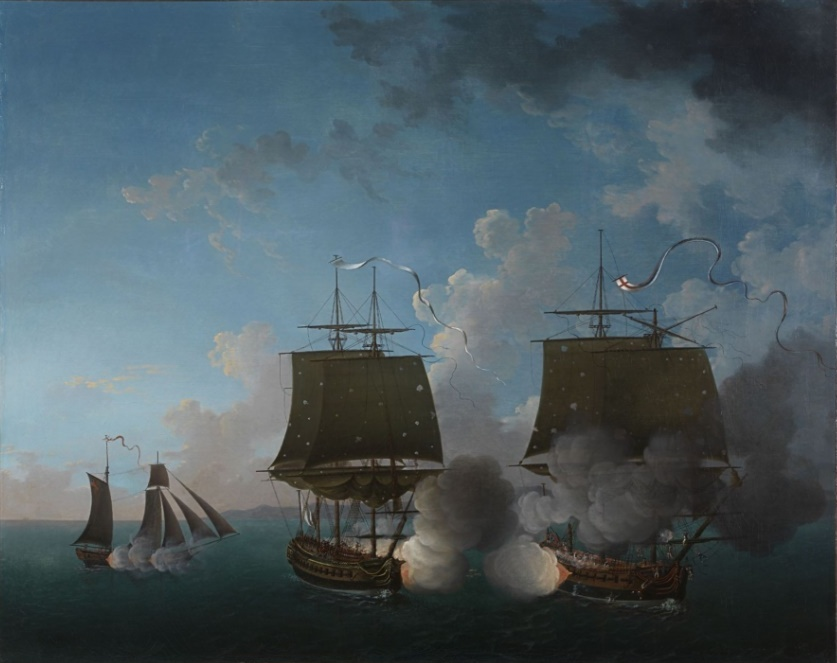
Combat de la Concorde contre la Minerve le 22 août 1778, by Auguste-Louis de Rossel de Cercy.

Le Gardeur was promoted to Captain on 24 October 1778. That same year, he was in command of the frigate Concorde. On 21 August, he captured the British frigate HMS Minerva. His younger brother, also a Navy officer serving on Concorde, was killed in the action. The action was celebrated to the point that the Navy Minister commissioned a painting of the battle.

On 18 February 1779, Concorde encountered a 32-gun British frigate, that she fought for three hours before the ships disengaged. Le Gardeur de Tilly was wounded in the action. (Note: Troude and Roche call the British ship HMS Congres, but no ship seems to have borne that name.)

In early 1781, Des Touches gave Le Gardeur command of a division comprising the 64-gun Éveillé, the frigates Gentille and Surveillante, and the cutter Guêpe. On 19 February 1781, The squadron met a British convoy, and captured the 44-gun HMS Romulus and 8 transports. They burnt 4 of the transports, sent the others to Yorktown, and took Romulus in French service.

He took part in the Battle of Cape Henry on 16 March 1781, and in the Battle of the Saintes on 12 April 1782.

Le Gardeur de Tilly retired in 1792, with the rank of Vice-Admiral. During the Reign of Terror, Le Gardeur de Tilly was imprisoned, but he was freed at the Thermidorian Reaction.
