= Louis-André-Joseph de Lombard =

French Navy officer of the War of American Independence

Louis-André-Joseph de Lombard was a French Navy officer. He served in the War of American Independence.

== Biography ==
Lombard was born to the family of a Council of the Parliament of Bordeaux. He joined the Navy as a Garde-Marine on 17 September 1751. He was promoted to Lieutenant on 1 October 1764.

In 1770, he took command of the 14-gun fluyt Barbue, at Rochefort. He commissioned her an Ile d'Aix in January 1771. She was wrecked in December 1771 at Penmarch.

In 1773, Lombard commanded the 16-gun corvette Perle. In 1777, he commanded ship Courtier at Rochefort. He was promoted to Captain on 4 April 1777.

In 1779, he captained the frigate Terpsichore, first around Ile de Ré, Ile d'Aix and Brest, and then part of the squadron under Orvilliers. He was later promoted to the command of the 64-gun Provence, which he commanded at the Battle of Cape Henry on 16 March 1781.

Lombard was a Knight in the Order of Saint Louis and a member of the Society of the Cincinnati.
