= Flag captain =

Royal Navy post

In the Royal Navy, a flag captain was the captain of an admiral's flagship. During the 18th and 19th centuries, this ship might also have a "captain of the fleet", who would be ranked between the admiral and the "flag captain" as the ship's "First Captain", with the "flag captain" as the ship's "Second Captain".

Unlike a "captain of the fleet", a flag-captain was generally a fairly junior post-captain, as he had the admiral to keep an eye on him, but – like a "captain of the fleet" – a "flag captain" was a post rather than a rank.
