= Latouche-Tréville (disambiguation) =

Latouche-Tréville may refer to:

== People ==
- Charles-Auguste Levassor de La Touche-Tréville (1712–1788), French Navy officer
- Louis-Charles Le Vassor de La Touche (1709–1781), comte de La Touche, French governor of Martinique.
- Louis-René Levassor de Latouche Tréville (1745– 1804), French Vice-admiral

== Other ==
- French ship Latouche-Tréville, one of three ships of the French Navy
