= James Hawker (Royal Navy officer) =

Royal Navy officer (c. 1730–1787)

Captain James Hawker
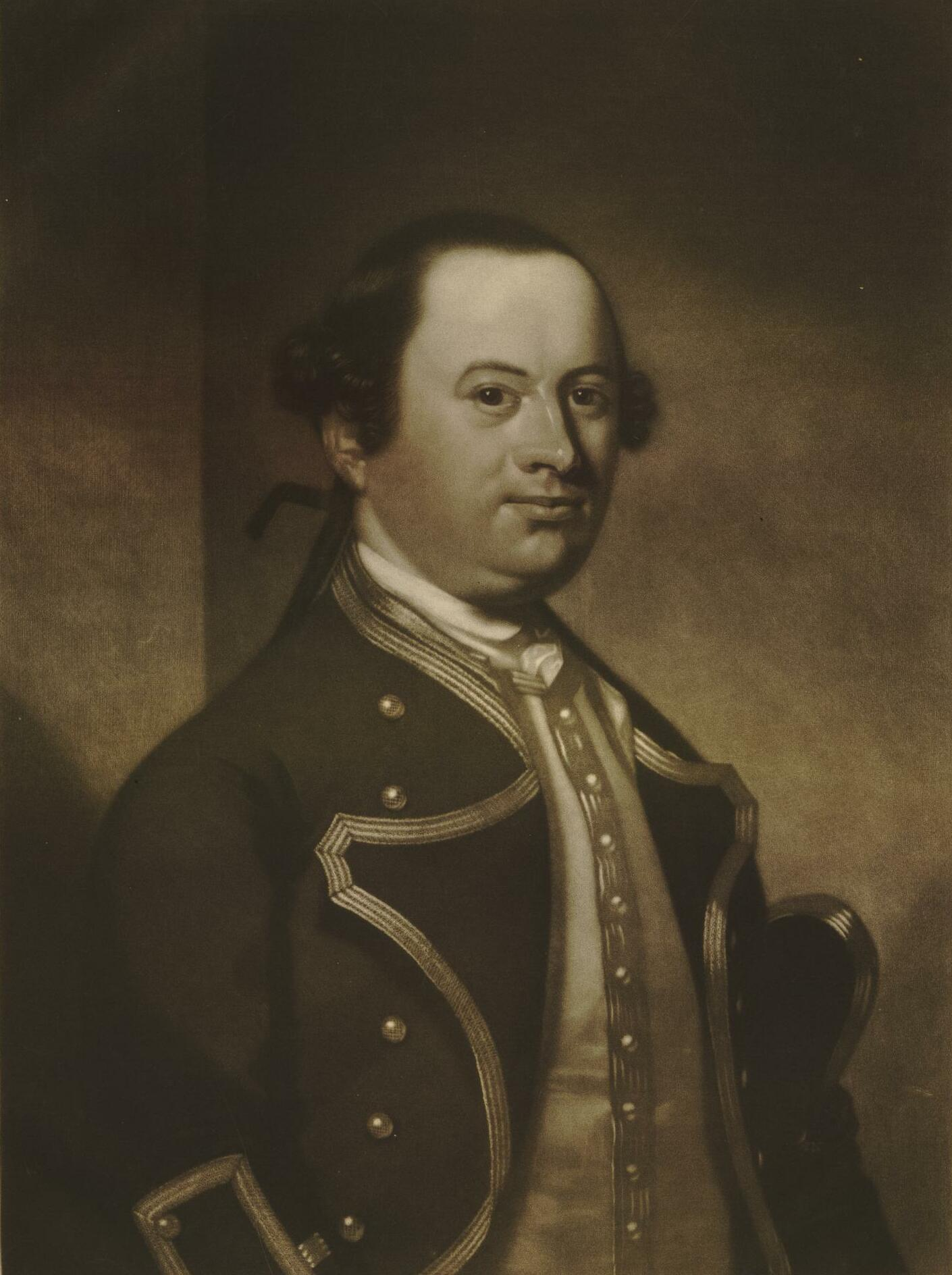
- Born: c. 1730
- Died: 1786
- Children: Edward Hawker
- Military career
- Allegiance: Great Britain
- Service: Royal Navy
- Service years: 1744–1781
- Rank: Post-captain
- Commands: HMS Iris; HMS Hero
- Conflicts: Seven Years' War; American Revolutionary War; Action of 7 June 1780; Battle of Porto Praya

Captain James Hawker (c. 1730–1786) was an English officer in the Royal Navy. After service on the Shrewsbury and Sheerness, he was appointed first lieutenant of the Colchester at the end of 1755, and was posted in 1768. With the Iris he fought a drawn battle with La Touche Treville in the more powerful frigate Hermione off New York in 1780. He commanded the Hero in Porto Praya under Commodore George Johnstone in 1781, after which he had no further service.

== Career ==
James Hawker was born in or before 1730. He entered the naval service in 1744 on board the Shrewsbury with Captain Solomon Gideon. He was afterwards with Captain Rodney in the Sheerness, with Lucius O'Bryen in the Colchester, and Molyneux Shuldham. His passing certificate is dated 4 June 1755. On 31 December 1755 he was appointed lieutenant of the Colchester, which in 1759 was attached to the fleet off Brest, under Hawke. On 6 August 1761 he was promoted to the command of the Barbadoes, and in April 1763 was appointed to the Sardoine. He was posted on 26 May 1768, and in March 1770 commissioned the Aldborough.

In July 1779 he commanded the Iris, a 32-gun frigate, on the coast of North America, and in her, on 6 June 1780, fought what naval historian John Knox Laughton has called "a well-conducted and equal action" with the French 36-gun frigate Hermione, commanded by M. La Touche Tréville, who died in 1804, vice-admiral in command of the Toulon fleet. After a severe combat the two ships separated, both disabled; the Iris returned to New York, and the Hermione made the best of her way to Boston. La Touche was greatly mortified, as his frigate was by far the more powerful, and he had previously boasted that he would clear the coast of British cruisers. Some angry correspondence ensued, with the object apparently of determining which of the two ran away from the other. This was published in the New York Gazette, and created a very unfavourable impression of La Touche's conduct, to which Nelson angrily referred during the time of his Toulon command. It is said that during the action a chain-shot did a good deal of damage to the Hermione, on which La Touche remarked, "Voilà une liaison bien dangereuse!" ('This is a very dangerous affair!'). According to Laughton, however, it is very doubtful if the Iris fired any chain-shot.

On 1 August Hawker was moved into the Renown, which he took to England, and on 10 November was appointed to the Hero, one of the squadron with Commodore George Johnstone in Porto Praya on 16 April 1781. He quit the Hero shortly afterwards, and had no further service. He died early in 1786, probably at Plymouth, where he owned property and had business interests. (Note: Although Laughton says he died in 1787.)

== Personal life ==
He left a family of three sons and five daughters, three of whom married naval officers, Admiral Charles Boyles, Admiral Edward Oliver Osborne, and Admiral Sir Michael Seymour, Baronet; another daughter married Sir William Knighton, private secretary and keeper of the privy purse to George IV. Of the sons two entered the army; the third, Edward, died, an admiral, in 1860.

== Sources ==
- Beatson, Robert (1804). Naval and Military Memoirs of Great Britain, from 1727 to 1783. Vol. 5. London: Longman, Hurst, Rees and Orme. p. 47.
- Laughton, J. K.; Pearsall, A. W. H. (2004). "Hawker, James (b. in or before 1730, d. 1786), naval officer". Oxford Dictionary of National Biography (online ed.). Oxford University Press. doi:10.1093/ref:odnb/12653. (Subscription, Wikipedia Library access or UK public library membership required.)
- Nicolas, Nicholas Harris, ed. (1846). The Despatches and Letters of Vice Admiral Lord Viscount Nelson. Vol. 6. London: Henry Colburn. p. 165.

Attribution:

- This article incorporates text from a publication now in the public domain: Laughton, John Knox (1891). "Hawker, James". In Stephen, Leslie; Lee, Sidney (eds.). Dictionary of National Biography. Vol. 25. London: Smith, Elder & Co. p. 200.
