= Levassor =

Levassor is a surname. Notable people with the surname include:

- Charles-Auguste Levassor de La Touche-Tréville, French Navy officer.
- Émile Levassor (1843–1897), French engineer and pioneer of the automobile industry and car racing
- Louis-Charles Le Vassor de La Touche (1709–1781), French naval general, governor general of Martinique.
- Louis-René Levassor de Latouche Tréville (1745–1804), French Vice-admiral.
- Pierre Levassor (1808–1870), French stage actor
