= Edward Hawker =

Royal Navy Admiral (1782-1860)

Admiral Edward Hawker
- Born: 7 November 1782
- Died: 8 June 1860 (aged 77); Brighton, Sussex
- Relatives: George Charles Hawker (son)
- Military career
- Allegiance: United Kingdom of Great Britain and Ireland
- Branch: Royal Navy
- Service years: 1786 (de facto from 1792) – 1860
- Rank: Admiral
- Commands: HMS Port Mahon; HMS Mignonne; HMS Theseus; HMS Tartar; HMS Melampus; HMS Bellerophon; HMS Salisbury; HMS St Vincent
- Conflicts: French Revolutionary Wars; Action of 7 May 1794; Napoleonic Wars; Invasion of Guadeloupe; War of 1812

Edward Hawker (7 November 1782 – 8 June 1860) was an officer of the Royal Navy who served during the French Revolutionary and Napoleonic Wars.

Born as the son of a naval officer in 1782, Edward Hawker was first entered in the books of a warship when just four years old. His actual seagoing service did not begin until 1792, after which he saw action in some of the early engagements of the French Revolutionary Wars. Commissioned a lieutenant at thirteen, he served with several relatives both in the West Indies and in the waters off the British coast. A commander at twenty-one, he captained his own ships at the outbreak of the Napoleonic Wars. Posted again to the West Indies, he endured several mishaps, including running his ship aground, and then having it struck by lightning and damaged. His travails with the weather there continued after his promotion to post-captain, including a severe hurricane that dis-masted his ship and nearly sank her.

He was a successful frigate captain in the Caribbean, capturing a number of enemy privateers, and served at the capture of Guadeloupe in 1810. Rewarded with the command of ships of the line, he spent most of his time in North American waters or the Caribbean towards the end of the Napoleonic Wars and during the War of 1812. The end of the wars after 1815 left little opportunity for active service, but Hawker briefly commanded a ship as flag captain to the Earl of Northesk, and eventually reached flag-rank himself. He spent his retirement as a correspondent for The Times, and died an admiral in 1860, one of the last surviving commanders of the wars with France.

== Family and early life ==
Edward Hawker was born on 7 November 1782, the son of Captain James Hawker, who had served during the American War of Independence. Hawker was nominally entered onto the books of the 28-gun HMS Pegasus by her captain, Prince William Henry, the future King William IV, in May 1786. Hawker was just four years old at the time, making this a fictitious entry to allow him to gain "sea time" and seniority. He did not begin his actual naval service for another six years, until he was ten years old. Serving during the French Revolutionary Wars, Hawker was aboard HMS Swiftsure at the action of 7 May 1794, when his ship captured the French frigate Atalante, and took her captain, Charles-Alexandre Linois, prisoner.

Hawker was commissioned a lieutenant in 1796, at the age of thirteen, and went out to the West Indies with his brother-in-law, Captain Charles Boyles, and served on several of his ships. He later served as a lieutenant aboard HMS Garland, and aboard the 18-gun sloop HMS Spitfire, under the command of another brother-in-law, Michael Seymour. Hawker's ships were active in operations against French and Spanish privateers and merchants, and he assisted in the capture of two large privateers. He then became first-lieutenant of the 32-gun HMS Thames, and commanded her boats in a successful cutting-out expedition against a Spanish privateer. Hawker then left active service for a period on half-pay during the Peace of Amiens.

== Napoleonic Wars ==
Hawker was back in action with the outbreak of the Napoleonic Wars in 1803, having been promoted to commander. He was given a small hired 4-gun cutter named Swift in June 1803 and sent to patrol off Martinique. He carried out an attack against two French schooners, capturing both, but was forced to abandon his prizes after French troops appeared. He briefly took charge of the brig HMS Port Mahon in August 1803, but was soon transferred to the sloop HMS Mignonne. His service in command of Mignonne was eventful, in June 1804 she ran ashore off Lucca, Jamaica. As she was being towed to Port Royal by HMS Desiree, she was struck by lightning on 9 July. Three seamen were killed and several injured, while Mignonne sustained some damage.

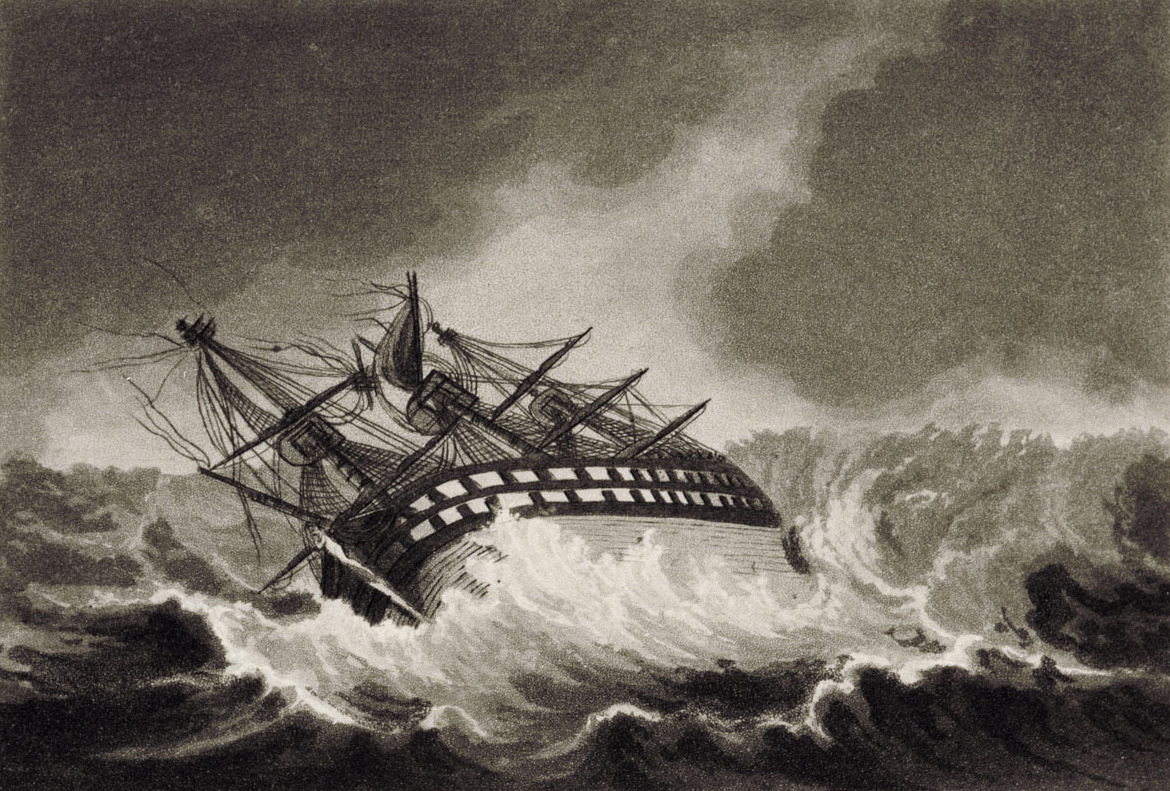
Illustration of HMS Theseus caught in the 1804 Antigua–Charleston hurricane

Hawker was promoted to captain on 6 June 1804 and appointed to command the 74-gun HMS Theseus. In August 1804 Theseus, flying the flag of Rear-Admiral James Richard Dacres, made a cruise north of Hispaniola in company with the 74-gun HMS Hercule. On 4 September, the two ships were caught in the 1804 Antigua–Charleston hurricane and both were almost completely dismasted. Theseus's boats were destroyed, and Hawker ordered a number of the guns to be thrown overboard. At one point there was 5 ft 6 in (1.68 m) of water in the hold, and it was only through continued pumping that both ships were able to weather the storm and return to Port Royal. Hawker left Theseus in late 1804, and in March 1805 commissioned the 32-gun HMS Tartar. Hawker spent two years cruising in the West Indies and off the coast of North America, making voyages to the Halifax Station, and on 9 June 1806 captured the 18-gun French brig Observateur in the West Indies.

Hawker was apparently involved in another hurricane some time after this, as Tartar was ordered to return to Britain to undergo repairs for damage sustained. Hawker remained in the West Indies however, transferring into the 36-gun HMS Melampus in September 1807. He continued to serve off North America, and in early 1809 escorted a convoy from Halifax to Barbados. On his voyage he came across the 16-gun French brig Colibri on 16 January, which put up a brief resistance before surrendering with three men killed and twelve wounded. Hawker had further success at the end of the year, chasing down and capturing the 16-gun Bernais off Guadeloupe on 14 December. Two men were wounded on Melampus, and one man killed and several wounded on Bernais. Hawker remained active off Guadeloupe into 1810 and supported the invasion and eventual capture of the island between January and February that year. One of his final successes in the Caribbean was the capture of the 20-gun privateer Fantôme on 28 May 1810, while in company with HMS Driver. Hawker then returned to Halifax and was based there until paying Melampus off in 1812 and returning to Britain to take his new command, the 74-gun HMS Bellerophon.

== War of 1812 ==
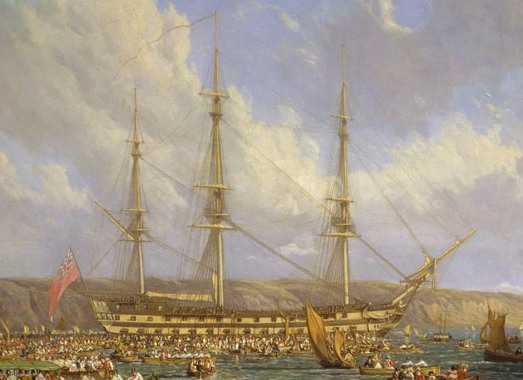
HMS Bellerophon, detail from Scene in Plymouth Sound in August 1815, an 1816 painting by John James Chalon. Hawker commanded her off North America and in the West Indies between 1813 and 1815.

Hawker commissioned Bellerophon on 11 February 1813, and preparations were made for Bellerophon to become the flagship of Vice-Admiral Sir Richard Goodwin Keats, the newly appointed Commodore-Governor of Newfoundland. Bellerophon transported Keats to St. John's, and then sailed south to Bermuda as a convoy escort. Returning to St John's in the summer, she captured several American ships, including the 16-gun French privateer Genie. She spent the rest of the year patrolling off Cape Race, before returning to Britain with a convoy in November. 1814 was spent on similar duties, Bellerophon escorted a convoy to St John's between April and June, and then patrolled off Cape Race until December. She then moved to the Nore, and on 9 April 1815 Hawker was superseded by Captain Frederick Lewis Maitland. Hawker's next command was the 58-gun HMS Salisbury, Bellerophon's replacement as Keats's flagship, and Hawker returned with her to Newfoundland, where he remained until Keats's posting expired.

== Later life ==
Despite the end of the wars with France in 1815, Hawker had some further service in the navy. He became flag-captain to William Carnegie, 7th Earl of Northesk, the Commander-in-Chief at Plymouth, in 1827, and from September 1829 commanded Northesk's flagship, the 120-gun guardship HMS St Vincent. Hawker went on half-pay with the expiration of Northesk's posting in 1830, and in 1837 Hawker was promoted to flag-rank. He spent his retirement as a correspondent for The Times, writing under the byline "A Flag Officer", and became a vice-admiral in 1847 and a full admiral in 1853. One of the last of the Napoleonic-era officers by the late 1850s, he succeeded to one of the good service pensions on the death of Admiral Frederick Whitworth Aylmer, 6th Baron Aylmer in 1858, and died two years later at Brighton, Sussex on 8 June 1860 at the age of 77 and with the rank of admiral. He had married Joanna Naomi, née Poore and had several children. Four of his sons, George, Charles, James and Alfred, emigrated to Australia and (notably George) became prominent citizens there. Admiral Hawker's daughter Adelaide Mary Dorothea Hawker (1832–1906) married the noted physician Dr. Robert Liveing, a brother of George Downing Liveing.

== See also ==
- O'Byrne, William Richard (1849). "Hawker, Edward" . A Naval Biographical Dictionary . John Murray – via Wikisource.
