= French ship Latouche-Tréville =

Three ships of the French Navy have borne the name Latouche-Tréville in honour of the 19th century politician and admiral Louis-René Levassor de Latouche Tréville.

== French warships named Latouche-Tréville ==
- Latouche-Tréville (1860), a steamer aviso.
- Latouche-Tréville (1894), an armoured cruiser
- Latouche-Tréville (1984), a Georges Leygues-class anti-submarine frigate.
Ships of the French Navy named Latouche-Tréville
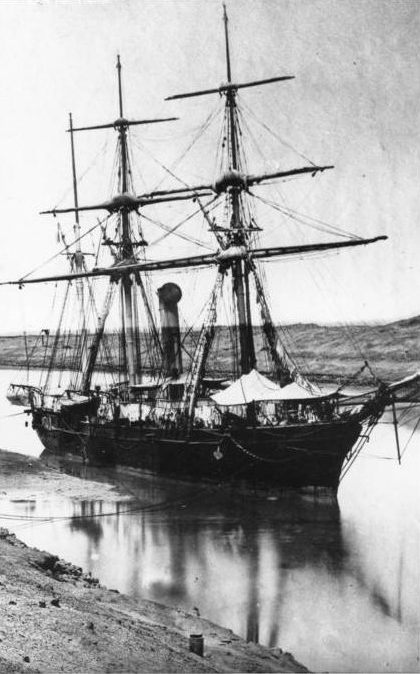
The steam 2nd-class aviso Latouche-Tréville (1860)

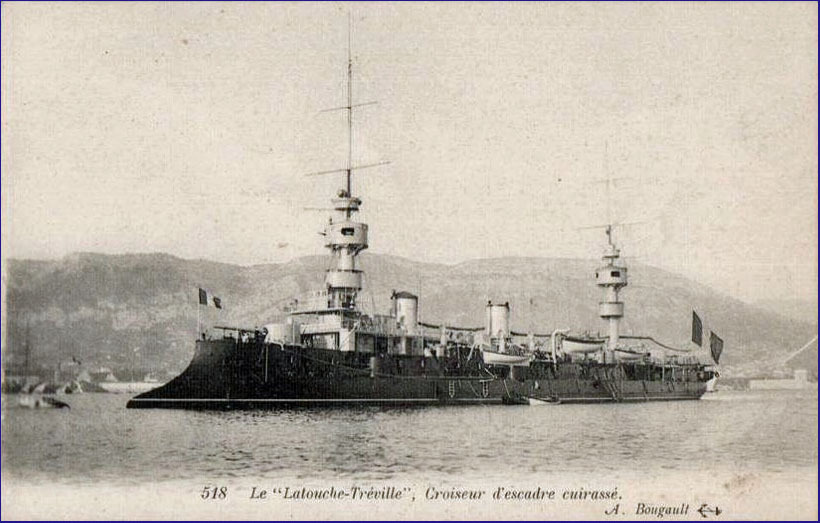
The armoured cruiser Latouche-Tréville

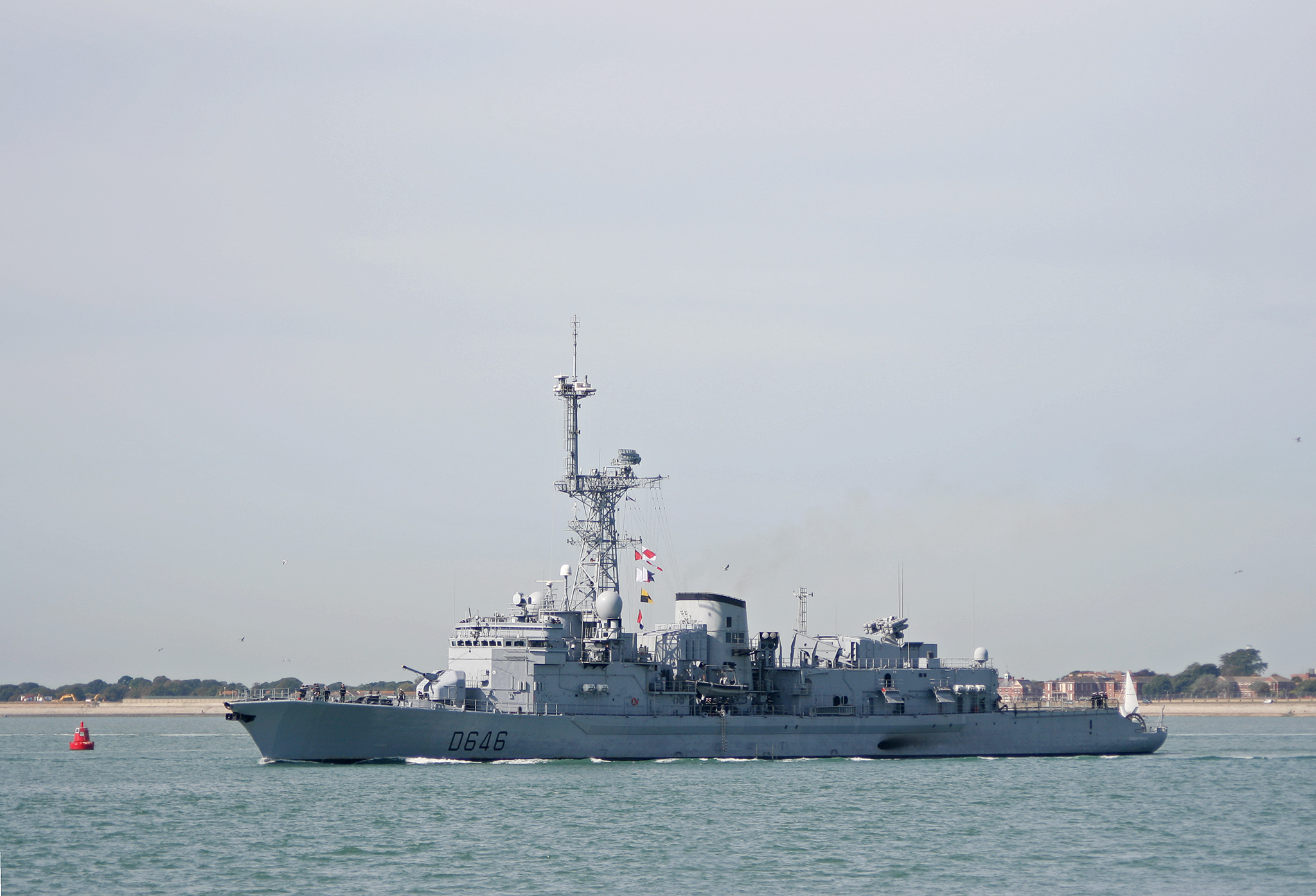
The F70-type frigate Latouche-Tréville

== Merchant ships ==
- Latouche-Tréville (1904), a merchant ship which Ho Chi Minh boarded when he left Vietnam in 1911.
