= Action of 7 June 1780 =

Naval battle of the American Revolution

- Part of the American Revolutionary War
Date	7 June 1780
Location	15 miles off Long Island
Result	Indecisive

Belligerents
France	Great Britain

Commanders and leaders
Louis-René Levassor de Latouche (WIA)	James Hawker

Strength
Hermione	HMS Iris

Casualties and losses
10 killed, 37 wounded	7 killed, 9 wounded

The action of 7 June 1780 took place during the American War of Independence between the frigates Hermione and HMS Iris. The ships exchanged fire for one hour and a half before parting. The battle resumed in written form when James Hawker published his account of the battle in a newspaper, which Louis-René Levassor de Latouche Tréville contested heatedly.

== Background ==
The Franco-American alliance marked the French intervention in the American War of Independence, yielding a considerable contribution to the Naval operations in the American Revolutionary War. France and Britain fought to control shipping lanes and supply their side on the American continent, while conducting support operations and landings.

One of the French frigates involved was Latouche's 32-gun Hermione, that had ferried General La Fayette France to Boston. After a brief period installing artillery for the defence of Rhode Island, Latouche returned off Long Island to intercept shipping to New York City.

== Action ==
On 7 June, Hermione was 15 miles South-East of Long Island, cruising under a fair South-Western wind, when she spotted four sails windward. As Hermione had good nautical qualities for her time, (Note: Hermione was one of the few coppered frigates at that time.) Latouche came nearer to the wind and closed in to investigate. He soon made the strange ships to be a frigate, a corvette, a schooner and a snow. The frigate reduced her sails and ran in the wind to intercept Hermione, which took a port tack for the same purpose.

Slightly before they arrived on each other's beam, both frigates reduced their lower sails and hoisted their flag, firing a full broadside. The British frigate was the 32-gun HMS Iris, (Note: Troude calls her Isis.) under Captain James Hawker. After overhauling Iris, Hermione turned to run into the wind, on a starboard tack, and easily sailed into the beam of Iris. The exchange of fire then resumed, and Latouche's left arm was shot through by a musket ball; he nevertheless continued to command his ship.

After an hour and a half of cannonade at half-musket range, Iris reduced the topsail of her foremast; as soon as Hermione overhauled her, she veered into the wind and sailed away. Latouche attempted to mirror this maneuver, but his rigging was torn to ribbons, and he could not give chase.

== Aftermath ==
Hermione sustained significant damage to her sails, and had 10 killed and 37 wounded. She had four holes near the waterline, and four cannonballs had penetrated her gundeck. She had fired 259 cannonballs. Latouche was pleased by the performance of his officers and his crew.

On 10 June, Hawker published his version of the battle in a newspaper, (Note: Troude names the newspaper as the "Gazette de New-Port) stating that Hermione had fled although an American frigate was in sight. Latouche published a letter written to Hawker, in which he stated that the rigging of his frigate was so torn that she could hardly maneuver and that Iris could have re-engaged at will. He further stated that he had attributed the retreat of Iris to her casualties, which he inferred from her low rate of fire at the end of the engagement, and was surprised to read that she had only seven killed and nine wounded.

Rémi Monaque notes that the other ships, that both parties identify in their arguments as hostile warships, were most likely mere merchantmen trying to avoid both frigates.

24 years later, Nelson alluded to the British account of the action when a dispute opposed him to Latouche.

== Bibliography ==
- Guérin, Léon (1857). Histoire maritime de France (in French). Vol. 5. Dufour et Mulat. pp. 50–52.
- Guérin, Léon (1845). Les marins illustres de la France (in French). Belin-Leprieur et Morizot.
- Levot, Prosper (1866). Les gloires maritimes de la France: notices biographiques sur les plus célèbres marins (in French). Bertrand.
- Monaque, Rémi (2000). Les aventures de Louis-René de Latouche-Tréville, compagnon de La Fayette et commandant de l'Hermione (in French). Paris: SPM.
- Roche, Jean-Michel (2005). Dictionnaire des bâtiments de la flotte de guerre française de Colbert à nos jours. Vol. 1. Group Retozel-Maury Millau. ISBN 978-2-9525917-0-6. OCLC 165892922.
- Troude, Onésime-Joachim (1867). Batailles navales de la France (in French). Vol. 2. Challamel ainé.
