= Charles Boyles =

English Vice-admiral of the Royal Navy

Vice-Admiral Charles Boyles
- Born: 1756
- Died: 10 November 1816 (aged 59–60)
- Military career
- Allegiance: Great Britain; United Kingdom
- Service: Royal Navy
- Service years: 1771–1816
- Rank: Vice-Admiral of the Blue
- Conflicts: War of the First Coalition; Atlantic campaign; Action of 7 May 1794; War of the Third Coalition; Trafalgar campaign; Action of 22 July 1805; Anglo-Turkish War

Charles Boyles (1756–1816) was a senior officer in the British Royal Navy. His conduct when commanding the Windsor Castle, in the action of 22 July 1805, under Sir Robert Calder, with the combined French and Spanish fleets, was noteworthy. He passed nearly half a century in the naval service of his country, rising to the rank of Vice-Admiral of the Blue.

== Life ==
Charles Boyles was the son of Charles Boyles, Esq., Collector of the Customs at Wells, in Norfolk. In the year 1771, at the age of fifteen, he embarked with Lord Nelson, on board HMS Raisonable, of 64 guns, commanded by Captain Suckling, to whom he was recommended by Marquis Townshend, and afterwards served the principal part of his time as midshipman and master's mate, with Captain Sir Thomas Rich, in the Enterprize frigate, on the Mediterranean station. He was afterwards promoted, and served as lieutenant of the Duke, of 98 guns, commanded by Captain (afterwards Lord) Gardner, in the defeat of Count de Grasse, by the fleet under Lord Rodney, on 12 April, in the West Indies. He remained on that station until he was promoted to the rank of Commander, and appointed to the Barbadoes sloop of war, in which ship he returned to England. The Zebra sloop having been selected to be stationed on the coast of Ireland, Captain Boyles was appointed to her, and continued in the command of her for three years, when she was paid off. He then commissioned the Vulcan fireship, and out of that ship he was made a post captain.

In 1792, Captain Bowles married Mary Dorothea, daughter of Captain James Hawker, of the Royal Navy. On the breaking out of the war in 1793, Captain Boyles was appointed to the Pegasus frigate, of 28 guns, and shortly after, at the particular request of Admiral Kingsmill, to the Swiftsure, of 74 guns, bearing his flag, and stationed on the coast of Ireland; the Admiral's residence being on shore at Cork, the Swiftsure usually cruised at sea, and being ordered to see a convoy, under the St. Alban's, a certain distance on their passage to the West Indies, on 5 May 1791 fell in with two French frigates, one of which, the Atalante, of 38 guns, was captured by the Swiftsure, after a chase of 38 hours.

ln May 1795, the Swiftsure, with the Hannibal, was put under the orders of the Leviathan, Captain Duckworth, and sailed for St. Domingo, and the Jamaica station. On their arrival, the commander-in-chief, Admiral Parker, having his flag in the Raisonable, of 64 guns, obtained leave of the Admiralty to remove it to the Swiftsure, as a superior ship, by which arrangement Captain Boyles became commander of the Raisonable, the ship he first entered when he commenced his career in the navy, and remained on this station until the month of September 1797, when he was sent home by Commodore Duckworth, and refitted, after one cruise with Lord Bridport, in quest of the French fleet, which attempted a descent upon Ireland.

She sailed in March following, with an India convoy, to the Cape of Good Hope, being intended to join a squadron under Lord Hugh Seymour, on an expedition to the South Seas, but from its not taking place, she remained on the Cape of Good Hope station, occasionally cruising off the Isle of France, and Madagascar, till July 1799, when she conveyed a fleet of Indiamen to England, and then joined the Channel fleet under Lord Bridport.

In 1800, the Raisonable was repaired at Chatham, and then ordered to the North Sea, under Admiral Sir Archibald Dickson.

In 1801, Captain Boyles was appointed to command the Saturn, of 74 guns; and before he joined her, to the Belleisle, 74 guns. In August he was removed into the Captain, 74 guns, all employed in the Channel Fleet. After the peace took place in October, the Captain was sent, with several other ships, to Jamaica, under Sir J. T. Duckworth, where she remained until January 1802. She then came home, and was paid off. After the war recommenced, Captain Boyles was appointed, in April 1804, to the Courageux, 74 guns, and proceeded with an India convoy to St. Helena, bringing another convoy back in October. The Courageux afterwards joined the Channel Fleet.

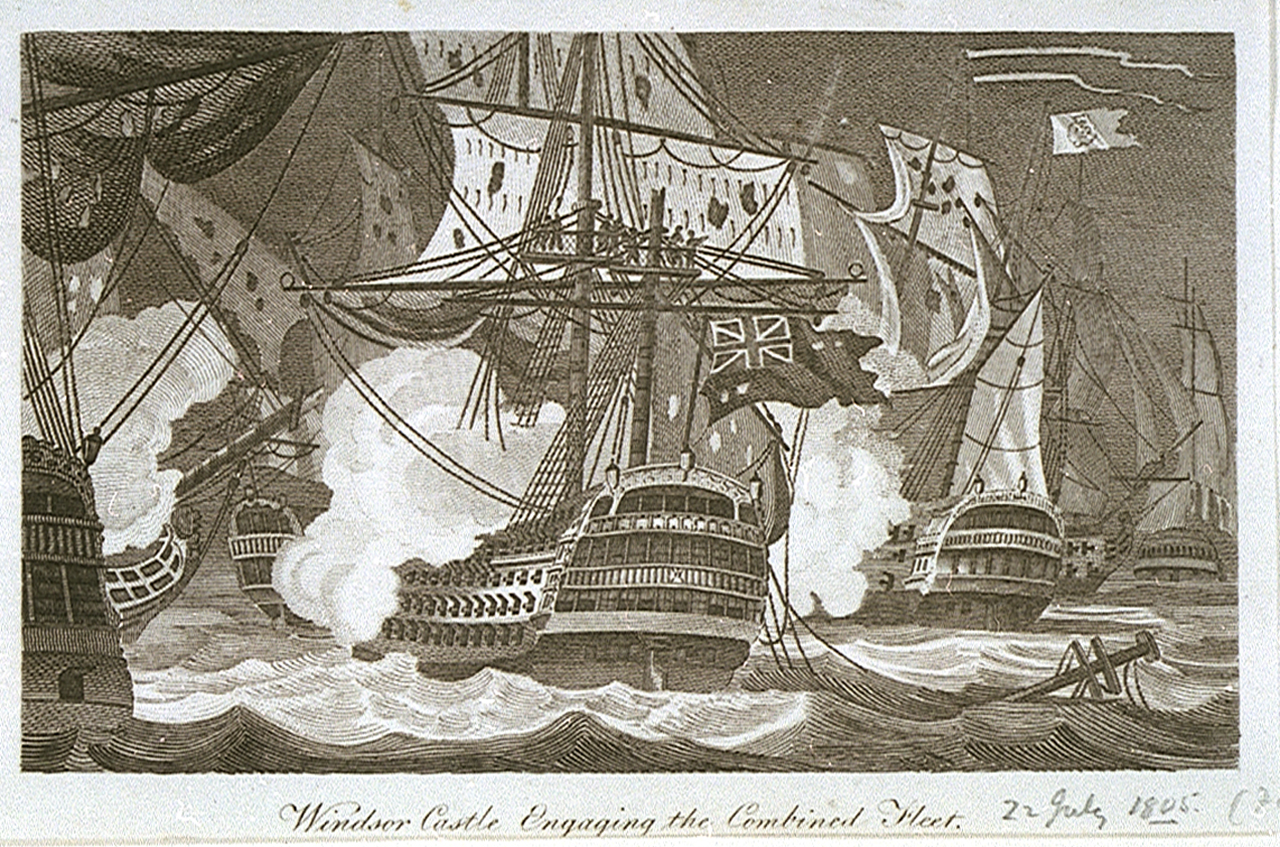
Windsor Castle Engaging the Combined Fleet, 22 January 1805

In January 1805, Captain Boyles was appointed to the Windsor Castle, of 98 guns, and cruised with a detached squadron in the Bay of Biscay. Having joined Sir Robert Calder's fleet in July, the Windsor Castle was particularly engaged in the action with the combined French and Spanish fleet on 22 January, when she had six officers and fifty men killed and wounded, and was so disabled as to be obliged to return to England with the two line-of-battle ships, prizes. Being repaired, the Windsor Castle joined the Channel Fleet under Admiral Cornwallis, and was detached with, a squadron under Sir Samuel Hood, off Rochfort, on 6 September, when a squadron of French frigates, with troops for their colonies, were chased, and four taken.

The Windsor Castle, in November, was ordered under Lord Collingwood, off Cadiz, and soon after to the Mediterranean, where Captain Boyles was for some time senior officer in Sicily and Malta. In April 1808, the Windsor Castle joined the squadron under Sir J. T. Duckworth, which passed up the Dardanelles, and in the arduous contest of repassing, and engaging the Turkish batteries, besides other material damage which she sustained, her main-mast was shot two-thirds through, by one of the extraordinary masses of stone, which weighed upwards of 800 lb (363 kg), and was 26 in (66 cm) in diameter, that were fired at, and struck the ships of the squadron, and was in the possession of Sir J. T. Duckworth.

On 28 April following, Captain Boyles was appointed a Colonel of Marines, and the Windsor Castle was paid off in November 1808.

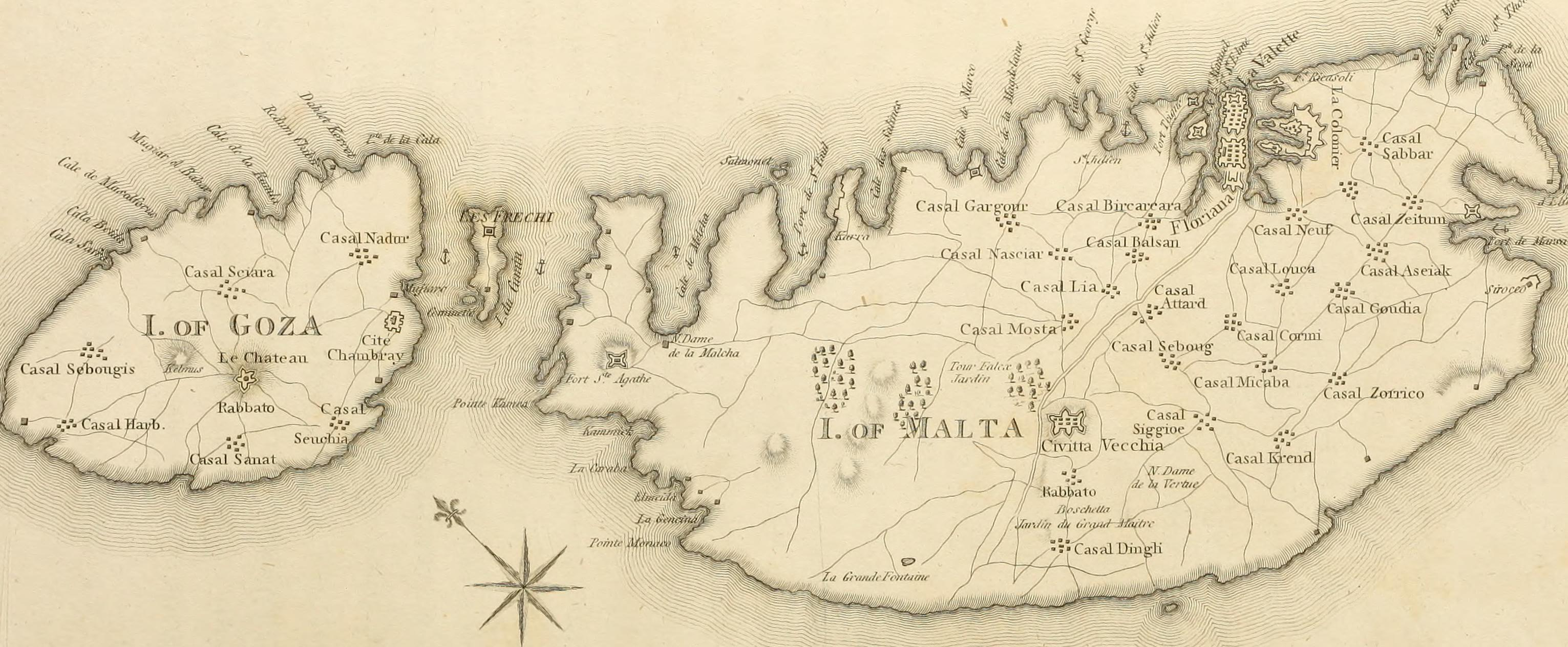
Malta and Goza, 1803

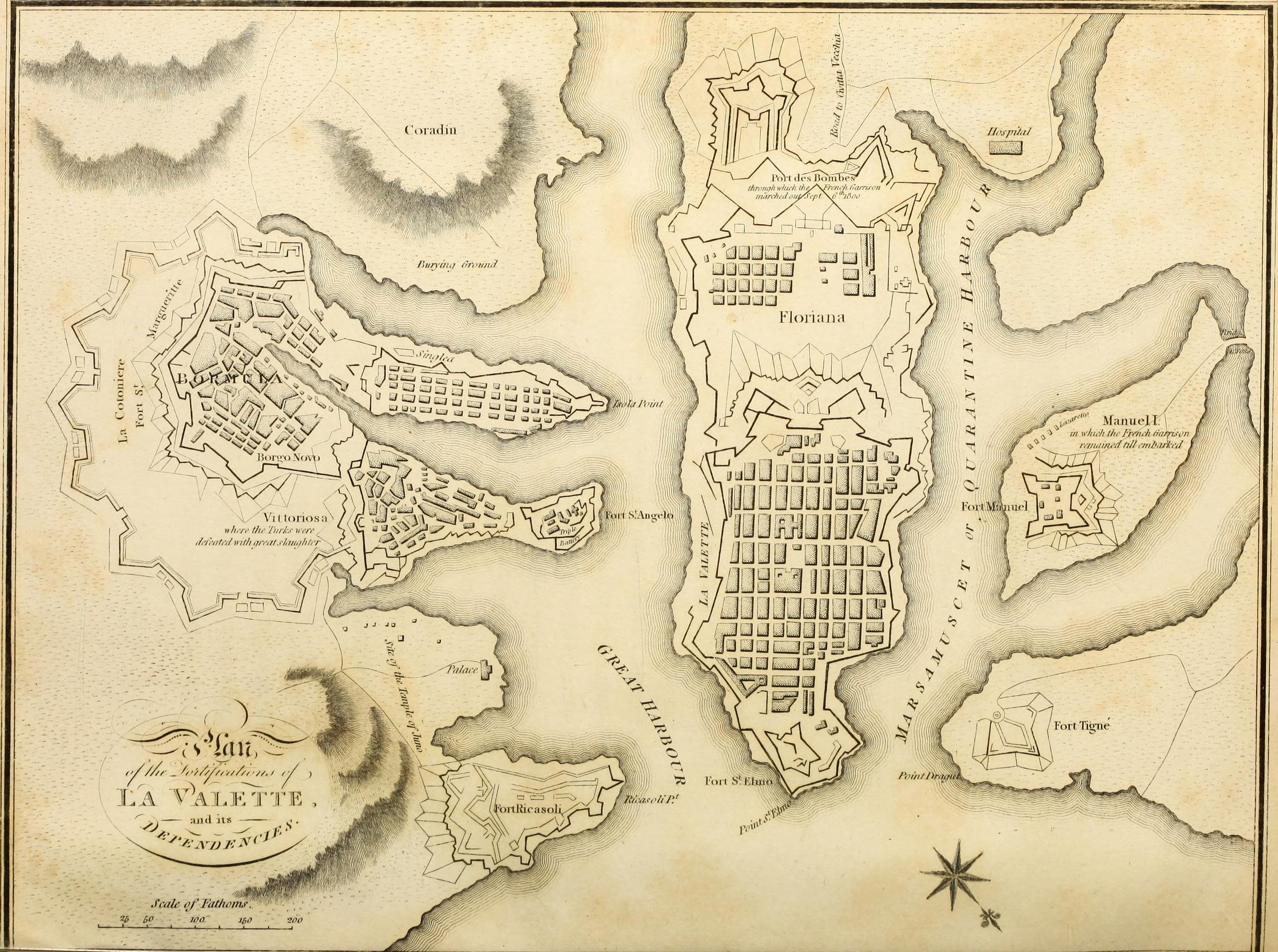
Fortifications of Valette, 1803

In the month of October 1809, Captain Boyles was promoted to the rank of Rear-Admiral of the Blue; and in May following received an appointment as commanding Admiral at Malta. On his arrival off that Island, on board the Lively frigate (in which ship he had taken his passage from Gibraltar), on 10 August, at 2 am, she struck on a reef of rocks, and was lost, the crew saving themselves by the masts which were cut away for that purpose. Admiral Boyles's flag remained on board the Trident in Vallette harbour until September, when he was ordered to relieve Rear-admiral George Martin, in command of the squadron at Sicily, and hoisted his flag in the Canopus, at Messina. In February 1811, Admiral Boyles received an offer from the commander-in-chief, Sir Charles Cotton, to be Captain of the Mediterranean Fleet (Sir Charles having communicated with the Admiralty on the subject), which he declined, preferring the active command at Sicily. In September, being again ordered to Malta, and finding it did not agree with his health, he applied to be superseded, returned to England in the Pearl frigate, and struck his flag in February 1812. He was promoted to the rank of Vice-Admiral on 4 June 1814, and died on 10 November 1816, leaving a widow and an only son, having served in the Royal Navy, principally at sea, in many countries and climates, for forty-five years.

== Sources ==
- Winfield, Rif (2008). British Warships in the Age of Sail 1793–1817: Design, Construction, Careers and Fates. 2nd ed. United Kingdom: Seaforth. ISBN 9781844157174, 1844157172.
- "Biographical Memoir of the Late Charles Boyles, Esq. Vice Admiral of the Blue". The Naval Chronicle. Vol. 38. pp. 265–269.
