= HMS Iris =

Eight ships of the Royal Navy have been named HMS Iris after the Greek mythological figure Iris or after the flower by that name. A ninth was planned but renamed before entering service:

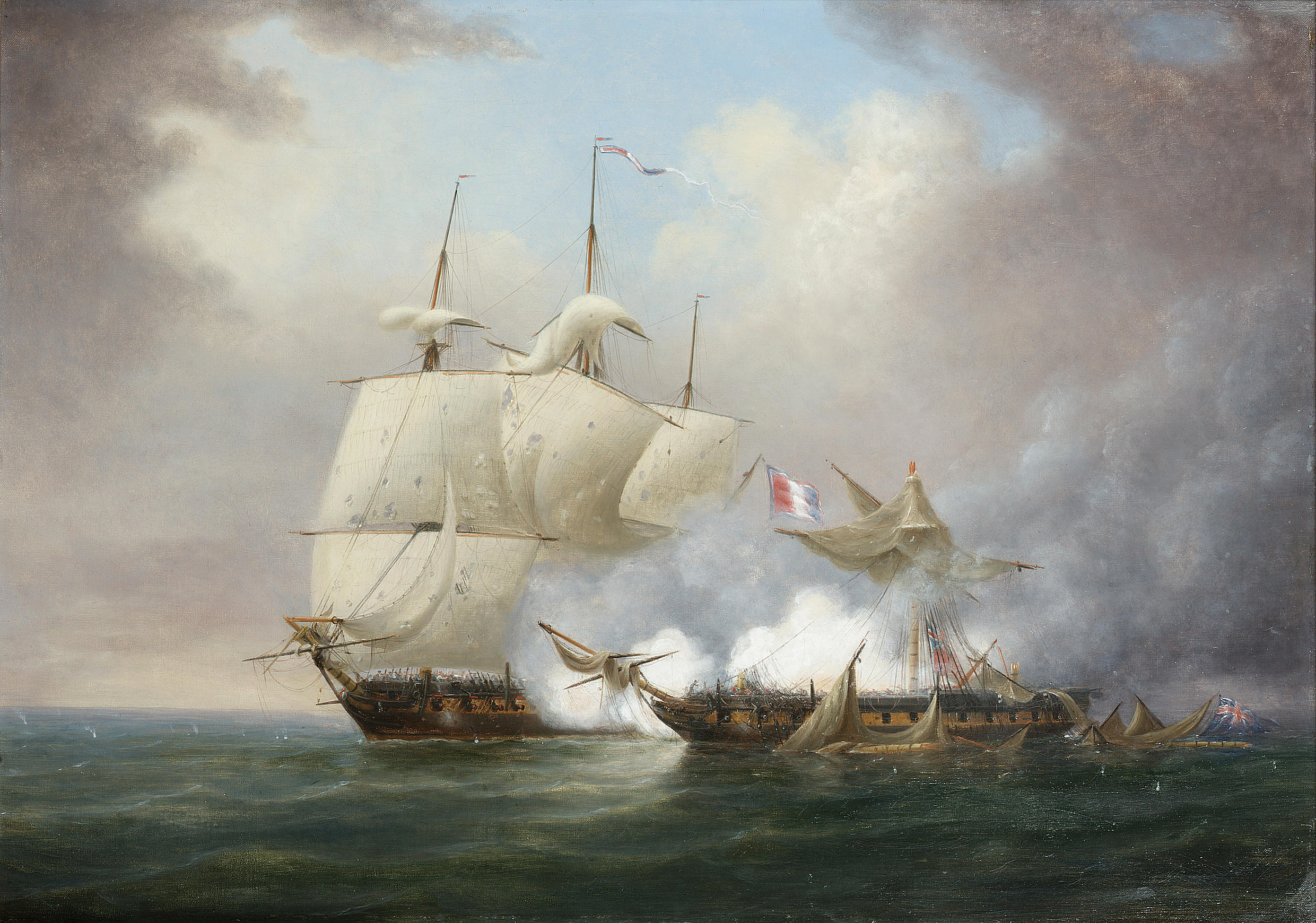
Battle between Citoyenne Française and HMS Iris on 13 May 1793, by Thomas Luny.

- HMS Iris was a 28-gun sixth rate, formerly the American USS Hancock. The British captured Hancock in 1777 and renamed her Iris, but lost her to the French in 1781, who sold her in 1784.
- HMS Iris (1783) was a 32-gun fifth rate launched in 1783. The Navy lent her to Trinity House in 1803, but reclaimed and refitted her in 1805. She was renamed HMS Solebay in 1809 and was broken up in 1833.
- HMS Iris (1807) was a 44-gun fifth rate, formerly the Danish Marie. She was captured in 1807 and sold in 1816.
- HMS Iris (1840) was a 26-gun sixth rate launched in 1840 and sold in 1869.
- HMS Iris (1877) was an Iris-class second class cruiser launched in 1877 and sold in 1905.
- HMS Iris (1915) was an Acacia-class sloop launched in 1915 and sold in 1920.
- HMS Iris II was a river ferry acquired by the Royal Navy for use in the Zeebrugge Raid.
- HMS Iris (1917) was a railway ferry converted to a "Landing Ship Sternchute (LSS)"
- HMS Iris was to have been a Flower-class corvette. She was renamed HMS Coriander before being launched in 1941, and was lent to the Free French Navy that year, being renamed Commandant Detroyat. She served until 1947 and was broken up in 1948.

== Battle honours ==
The ships of this name have several battle honours:

- Chesapeake 1781
- New Zealand 1860–1861
- Port Said 1882
- Suakin 1884
- Belgian Coast 1918
- Zeebruge 1918
