= HMS Sheerness =

Seven ships of the Royal Navy have borne the name HMS Sheerness, after the town of Sheerness in Kent, once home to Sheerness Dockyard:

- HMS Sheerness (1673) was a 2-gun smack launched in 1673 and sunk as a foundation in 1695.
- HMS Sheerness (1691) was a 32-gun fifth rate launched in 1691, rebuilt in 1731 and sold in 1744.
- HMS Sheerness (1743) was a 24-gun sixth rate launched in 1743 and sold in 1768.
- HMS Sheerness (1759) was a store lighter launched in 1759 and broken up in 1811.
- HMS Sheerness (1787) was a 44-gun fifth rate launched in 1787 and wrecked in 1805. Because Sheerness served in the navy's Egyptian campaign (8 March to 2 September 1801), her officers and crew qualified for the clasp "Egypt" to the Naval General Service Medal, which the Admiralty issued in 1847 to all surviving claimants.
- HMS Sheerness (1788) was a 4-gun tender launched in 1788 and broken up in 1811.
- HMS Sheerness (1791) was a 10-gun tender purchased in 1791 and probably sold in 1810.
