= HMS Colchester (1746) =

Ship of the line of the Royal Navy

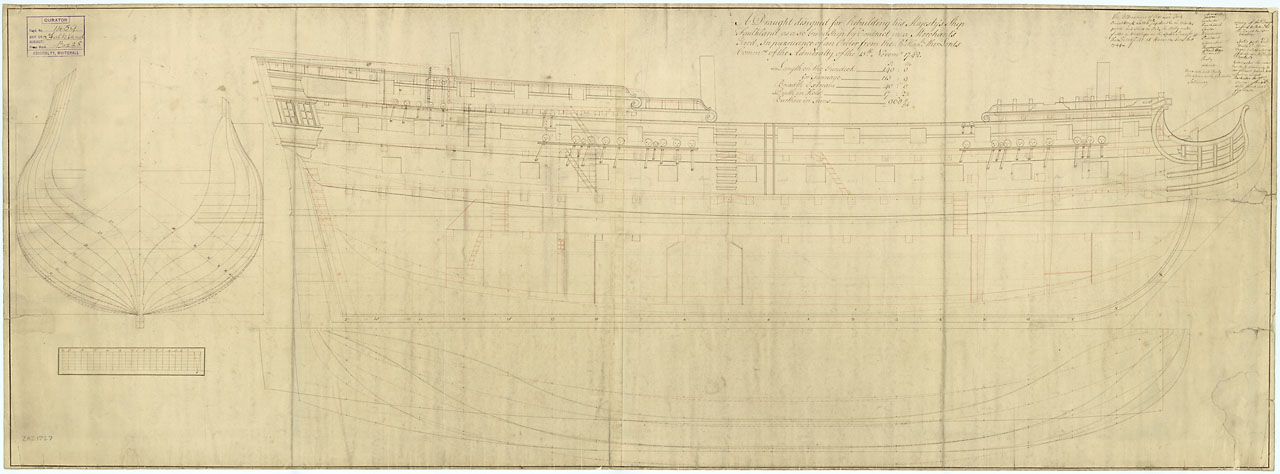
- Colchester

History

Great Britain
- Name: HMS Colchester
- Ordered: 6 November 1744
- Builder: Carter, Southampton
- Launched: 20 September 1746
- Fate: Broken up, 1773

General characteristics
- Class & type: 1741 proposals 50-gun fourth rate ship of the line
- Tons burthen: 978
- Length: 140 ft (42.7 m) (gundeck)
- Beam: 40 ft (12.2 m)
- Depth of hold: 17 ft 2 1/2 in (5.2 m)
- Propulsion: Sails
- Sail plan: Full-rigged ship
- Armament: 50 guns: Gundeck: 22 × 24 pdrs; Upper gundeck: 22 × 12 pdrs; Quarterdeck: 4 × 6 pdrs; Forecastle: 2 × 6 pdrs

HMS Colchester was a 50-gun fourth rate ship of the line of the Royal Navy, built at Southampton according to the dimensions laid down in the 1741 proposals of the 1719 Establishment, and launched on 20 September 1745. She was ordered as a replacement for the previous HMS Colchester, which had been wrecked just two months after being launched.

Colchester served until 1762, when she was found to be unfit for service. She was eventually broken up in 1773.
