= French aviso Latouche-Tréville =

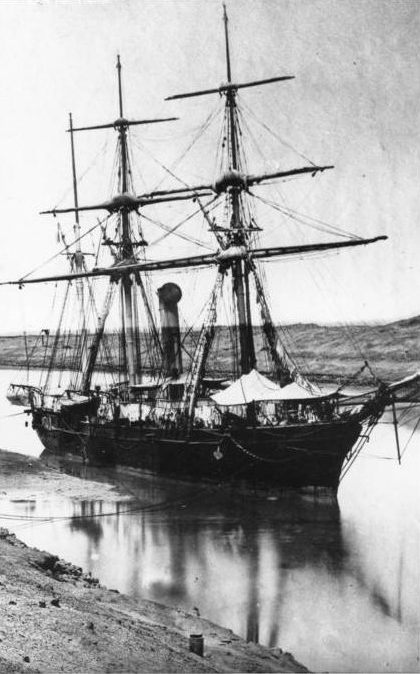
- Portrait of Latouche-Tréville. Photp by Marius Bar

History

France
- Name: Latouche-Tréville
- Namesake: Louis-René Levassor de Latouche Tréville
- Ordered: 3 August 1857
- Builder: Toulon Dockyard
- Laid down: June 1858
- Launched: 16 February 1860
- Completed: May 1860
- Commissioned: 7 May 1860
- Stricken: 5 June 1886
- Fate: Broken up 1887

General characteristics
- Class & type: Steamer aviso
- Displacement: 695 tonnes (684 long tons)
- Length: 53 m (174 ft) waterline
- Beam: 8.32 m (27.3 ft)
- Draught: 3.76 m (12.3 ft)
- Propulsion: steam engine, 150 hp (110 kW)
- Complement: 65 men in 1860, 88 from 1879
- Armament: two x 16mm 30-pounder long guns (shell); Later four 12-pounders and 14-pounders

The Latouche-Tréville was a wooden-hulled steam sloop aviso of the French Navy, a sistership to the D'Estaing. They were designed by Louis Dutard for both service on foreign stations and for various duties in home waters (including fishery protection).

== Career ==
After her commissioning, Latouche-Tréville sailed to Tahiti, where she was assigned to the French naval station of the Pacific Ocean. She returned to Brest on the 27 January 1868 to be decommissioned on 23 February 1867.

She was recommissioned on the 4 October 1868. On 18 February 1869, she collided with the packet ship Prince Pierre-Bonaparte, which sank off the Hyères Islands with the loss of sixteen lives. Latouche-Tréville rescued around 30 people. At the time of the collision, she was returning the body of Fuad Pasha to Constantinople, Ottoman Empire. She served off Terre-Neuve until 15 October 1870, when she was again decommissioned.

On 15 April 1873, she began her third commission for service in the South Atlantic. In September 1881, she took part in operations off Tunisia.

== Fate ==
Latouche-Tréville was struck on 5 June 1886 and broken up in the following year.
