= French frigate Latouche-Tréville =

Anti-submarine destroyer (1990–2022)

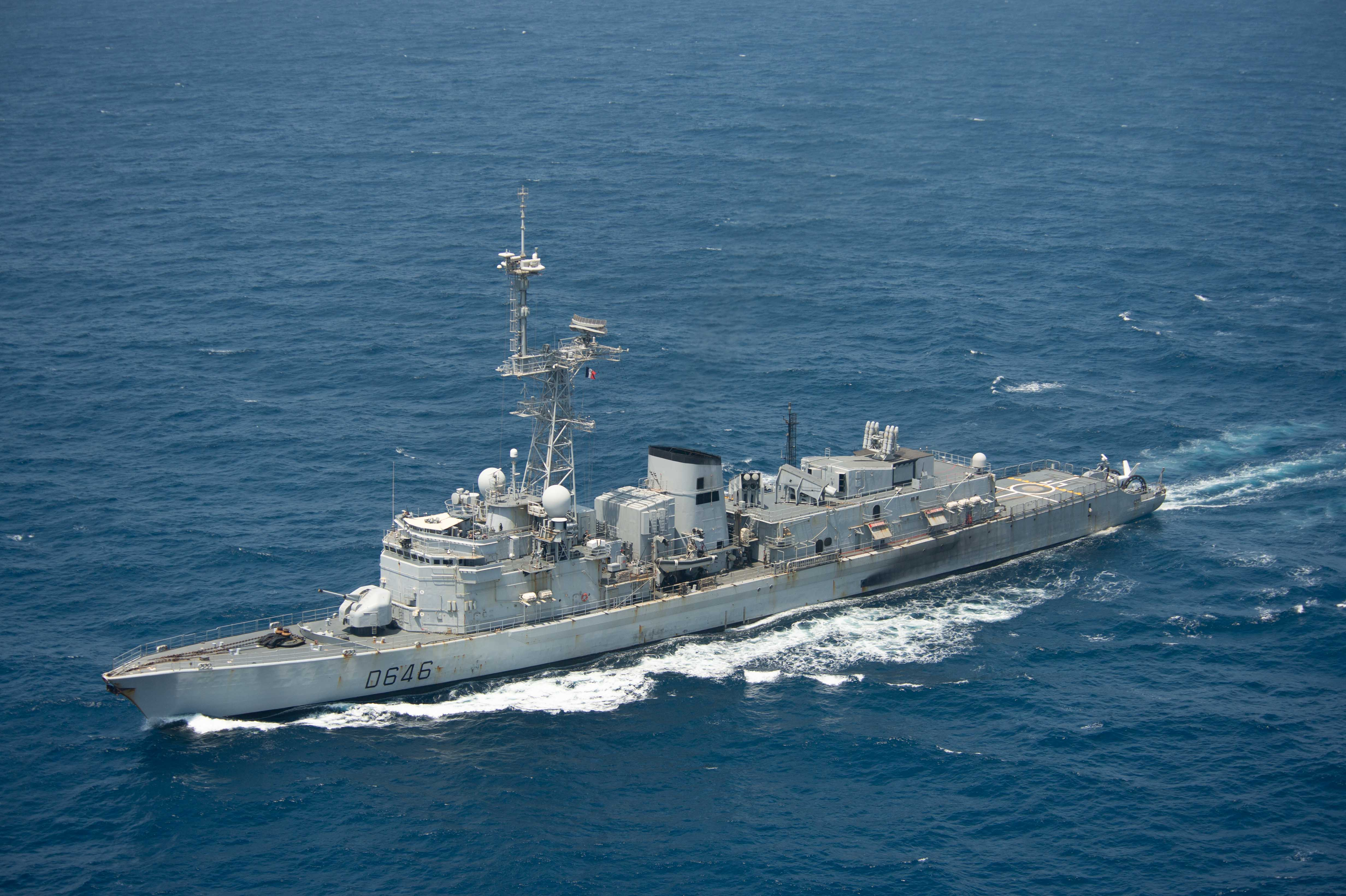
- Latouche-Tréville in April 2019

History

France
- Name: Latouche-Tréville
- Namesake: Louis-René Levassor de Latouche Tréville
- Laid down: 15 February 1984
- Launched: 19 March 1988
- Commissioned: 16 July 1990
- Decommissioned: 1 July 2022
- Identification: MMSI number: 228728000
- Status: Withdrawn from service

General characteristics
- Class & type: Georges Leygues-class frigate
- Displacement: 3,550 t (3,494 long tons); 4,500 t (4,429 long tons) full load
- Length: 139 m (456 ft 0 in)
- Beam: 14 m (45 ft 11 in)
- Height: 39.36 m (129 ft 2 in)
- Draught: 5.8 m (19 ft 0 in)
- Propulsion: CODOG; 2 × Pielstick PA 6 V280 STD diesels, 5,200 hp (3,878 kW); 2 × Rolls-Royce Olympus TM3B gas turbines, 26,000 hp (19,388 kW); 2 shafts with 4-blade controllable pitch propellers
- Speed: 30 knots (35 mph; 56 km/h) on gas turbines; 21 knots (24 mph; 39 km/h) on diesels
- Range: 1,000 nmi (1,900 km) at 30 kn (35 mph; 56 km/h) on gas turbines; 10,000 nmi (19,000 km) at 15 kn (17 mph; 28 km/h) on diesels
- Complement: 20 officers; 120 non-commissioned officers; 95 men
- Sensors & processing systems: Detection: 1 Air/surface sentry radar DRBV51C; 1 Air sentry radar DRBV 26; 1 Fire control radar DRBC 32E; 2 Navigation radar KH 1007; 1 Hull sonar DUBV 23; 1 Towed sonar DUBV 43C; Tactical information: SENIT 4; SEAO/OPSMER
- Electronic warfare & decoys: 2 Radar interceptors ARBR 16; 2 × Syllex chaff launchers
- Armament: Anti-air: 1 × Crotale EDIR system - 8 missiles on launcher + 18 stored; 2 × Simbad systems - 2 × 2 Mistral missiles; 1 × CADAM 100 mm main gun; 2 × 20 mm guns; 4 × 12.7 mm machine guns; Anti-surface: 8 × Exocet MM40 (Block 2) missiles; Anti-submarine: 10 × L5 Mod4 torpedoes; 2 × L5 torpedo launchers
- Aircraft carried: Formerly: 2 × Lynx WG13 Mk.4 helicopters (retired 2020), each with: 1 × DUAV4 sonar; Rheseda system for transmission of acoustic data; 12 × Mark 46 torpedoes; From 2020: AS565 Panther helicopter or Alouette III helicopter

Latouche-Tréville was a F70 type anti-submarine destroyer of the French Navy (Marine Nationale).

The French Navy does not use the term "destroyer" for its ships. Thus, some large ships, referred to as "frégates" in French, are registered as destroyers. And additionally, some minor ships, referred to as "avisos" in French, are registered as frigates.

She was the third French vessel named after the 18-19th century politician and admiral Louis-René Levassor de Latouche Tréville.

== Service history ==
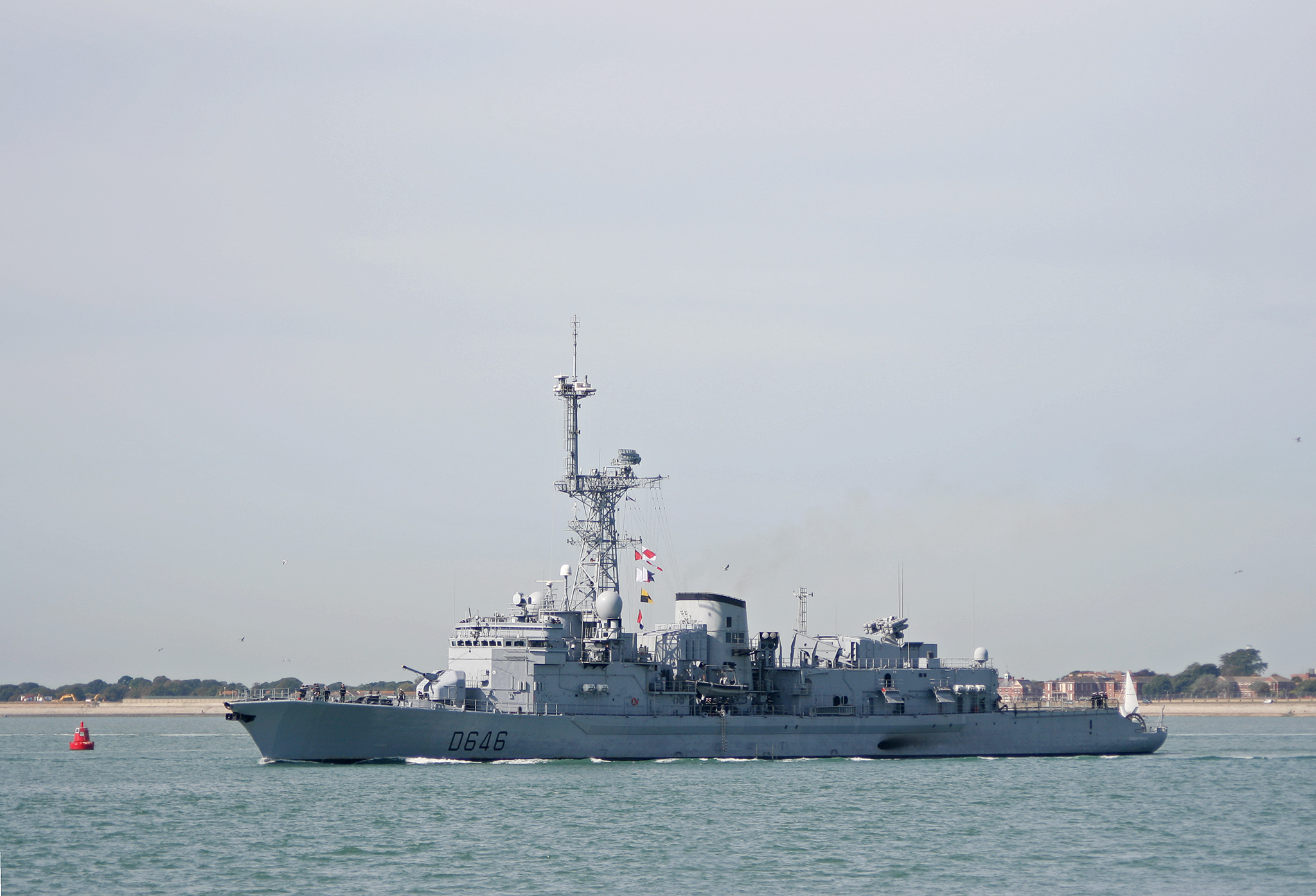
Latouche-Tréville departing from Portsmouth Naval Base, UK, 21 September 2009

In November 2006 and again in June 2010, Latouche-Tréville visited London on diplomatic duties, and was moored alongside the Second World War cruiser, HMS Belfast.

In mid 2009, she was filmed in stormy seas as part of the documentary Oceans. In late 2009, while attached to an international force of NATO vessels, Latouche-Tréville visited Portsmouth Naval Base in the United Kingdom with vessels of the Dutch, Norwegian, Spanish and Turkish navies.

On 15 October 2012, the frigate was moored at Leith Docks in Scotland.

On 18 April 2015, she escorted a replica of the 18th century sailing ship Hermione as it departed La Rochelle, France on her maiden voyage across the Atlantic to Yorktown, Virginia in the United States. Latouche-Tréville returned to Brest with the ship on 10 August. In May, Latouche-Tréville was among a dozen surface vessels and four submarines that took part in NATO's annual "Dynamic Mongoose" military exercise. Amid rising tensions with Russia, the two-week event in Norwegian waters saw ships under NATO command conducting a variety of anti-submarine warfare operations. On 4 June, she was moored again at Leith Docks in Scotland.

On 9 January 2020, the vessel suffered damage in a storm soon after departing from Brest, and returned to port the next day with her top mast missing. The incident also destroyed an electronic warfare pod and damaged the starboard SYRACUSE system. As of 2020, with the retirement of her sister ship La Motte-Picquet, Latouche-Tréville was the last vessel of her class in service.

In March 2022, the frigate deployed to the Baltic Sea for exercises with other NATO navies. On the deployment the ship embarked an older Alouette III helicopter. She returned to Brest in June 2022.

The frigate was withdrawn from service on 1 July 2022.
