= Action of 7 May 1794 =

Minor naval engagement during the French Revolutionary Wars

Coordinates: 54.424°N 10.805°W

- Part of the French Revolutionary Wars
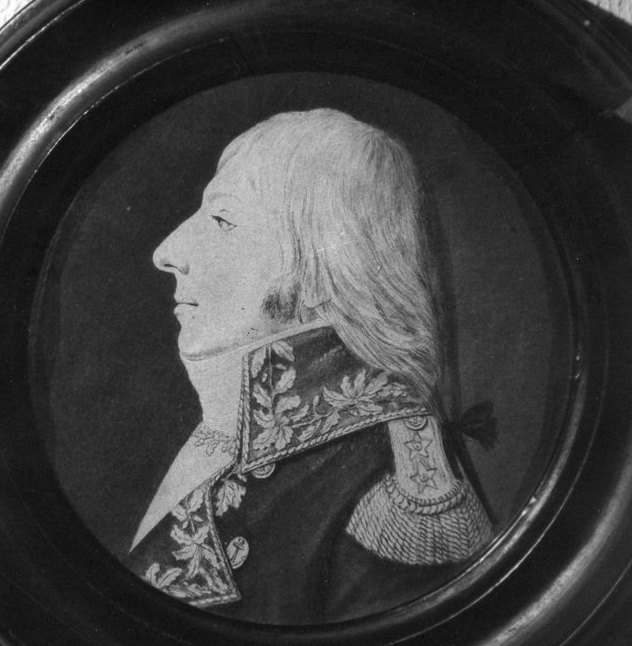
- Portrait of Charles-Alexandre Léon Durand Linois made approximately six years after the action
Date	5 May 1794
Location	Western Approaches, Atlantic Ocean
Result	British victory

Belligerents
Great Britain	France

Commanders and leaders
Charles Boyles	Charles-Alexandre Léon Durand Linois (surrendered)

Strength
2 ships of the line	1 frigate 1 corvette

Casualties and losses
1 killed	10 killed 32 wounded 1 frigate captured

The action of 7 May 1794 was a minor naval action fought between a British ship of the line and a French frigate early in the French Revolutionary Wars. The French Navy sought to disrupt British trade by intercepting and capturing merchant ships with roving frigates, a strategy countered by Britain by protecting convoys with heavier warships, particularly in European waters. On 5 May 1794, the British escorts of a convoy from Cork sighted two French ships approaching and gave chase. The ships, a frigate and a corvette, outmatched, separated, and the convoy escorts did likewise, each following one of the raiders on a separate course.

By the evening one of the French ships had successfully escaped, but the other was still under pursuit, Captain Charles Linois of Atalante attempting a number of tactics to drive off his opponent but without success. Eventually, after a chase lasting nearly two days, the French ship came within range of the much larger British 74-gun third-rate HMS Swiftsure and despite a brave defence was soon forced to surrender after suffering more than 40 casualties. Although he had surrendered his ship, Linois was widely praised for his actions in defending his ship against such heavy odds. (Note: Linois would later receive extensive criticism for his lack of aggressiveness at the Battle of Pulo Auro when a fleet of East Indiamen would bluff him into breaking off his attack.)

In the aftermath of the engagement, a French battle squadron that formed part of the developing Atlantic campaign of May 1794 pursued both ships for the rest of the day; their quarry eventually escaped after dark. Atalante was later taken into the Royal Navy as HMS Espion.

== Background ==
The outbreak of war between Britain and France in the spring of 1793 came at a time of differing fortunes for the navies of the two countries. The Royal Navy had been at a state of heightened readiness since 1792 in preparation for the conflict, while the French Navy had still not recovered from the upheavals of the French Revolution, which had resulted in the collapse of the naval hierarchy and a dearth of experienced officers and seamen. French naval strategy early in the war was to send squadrons and light vessels to operate along British trade routes, in order to disrupt British mercantile operations. This resulted in Britain forming its merchant ships into convoys for mutual protection, escorted by warships while in European waters to defend against roving attacks by French ships.

By the spring of 1794, France was in turmoil following the failure of the harvest, which threatened the country with starvation. In order to secure food supplies, France turned to its American colonies and the United States, which assembled a large grain convoy in Hampton Roads. To ensure the security of this convoy, the French Navy dispatched most of its Atlantic Fleet to sea during May 1794, operating in a series of large squadrons, independent cruisers and one major fleet under Louis Thomas Villaret de Joyeuse. On 5 May, two French ships operating independently, the 36-gun frigate Atalante under Captain Charles Linois and the corvette Levrette, spied a British convoy sailing south-west, three days out from Cork, and closed to investigate.

== Pursuit ==
The convoy that Linois had sighted was under the protection of two ships of the line, the Swiftsure under Captain Charles Boyles and the 64-gun HMS St Albans under Captain James Vashon. At 17:45, with the French frigates closing from the west and aware that they could not defend the whole convoy without immediate direct action, Boyles turned Swiftsure and St Albans towards the newcomers, hoisting their colours and Swiftsure firing three shots in the direction of the larger ship, Atalante. Together the British ships hugely outweighed and outmatched the French vessels, and as soon as Linois realised his mistake he gave orders for his ships to turn and make all sail to escape pursuit, raising the French tricolour and firing his stern-chasers, guns fitted in the rear of the ship, at his pursuers.

The French ships immediately separated. St Albans then followed Levrette while Swiftsure concentrated on Atalante. Throughout the rest of the evening the two chases continued. Then after darkness fell Levrette was able to outrun and escape from St Albans. Swiftsure however remained in touch with Atalante so that by 04:00 on 6 May the French frigate was approximately 2.5 nautical miles (4.6 km) ahead of the ship of the line to the northwest, with the wind direction to the north-northeast. For the entire following day Linois could not escape Boyles' pursuit, and at 17:30 Swiftsure was close enough to open fire again, using the bow-chasers for an hour and a half until Atalante once more pulled out of range. During the evening the French frigate was able to keep 2 nautical miles (3.7 km) in front of Swiftsure, but at midnight Linois switched his course to the south, hoping that the darkness would cloak the manoeuvre and that Atlante would be able to escape Boyles.

At 02:00 it became clear that Linois's ploy had failed and that Swiftsure was still following Atalante. More importantly, the manoeuvre had severely slowed the frigate. Although Linois hauled closer to the wind, Boyles was able to come within range at 02:30, firing his starboard guns into the smaller ship. Although his crew were exhausted by the extended chase Linois returned fire, the warships exchanging shot at long-range and the frigate suffering far more serious damage during the brief engagement. By 03:25 Linois was forced to surrender, his ship's rigging in tatters and casualties mounting among his crew. Boyles then provided a prize crew to the frigate and took most of the surviving French crew aboard his own ship as prisoners of war. Casualties on the French ship were heavy, with ten of the 274 men aboard killed and 32 wounded, compared to a single man lost on Swiftsure, which had also suffered some damage to its rigging.

== Aftermath ==
Boyles was not long able to enjoy his victory undisturbed: at 10:00 on 7 May, shortly after the removal of the French prisoners had been completed, sails were spotted on the horizon. These were rapidly identified as three French ships of the line that were making all haste to intercept and capture Swiftsure and Atalante. These ships were part of a squadron under Contre-Admiral Joseph-Marie Nielly that had sailed from Rochefort the day before in search of the American grain convoy shortly due in European waters. Issuing rapid orders, Boyles instructed Atalante's prize crew to separate and flee on a different course than Swiftsure to force the French to split their forces. The fast frigate Atalante soon outran pursuit and escaped into the Atlantic, the prize crew even managing to replace the damaged main topsail in the midst of the chase, with the assistance of the French prisoners on board. Swiftsure was slower, but Boyles was still able to increase the distance between his vessel and the French during the day, finally losing his pursuers by 22:00.

Both ships arrived safely at Cork on 17 May, Rear-Admiral Robert Kingsmill informing the Admiralty of the action by letter. Atalante subsequently served the Royal Navy as a 36-gun frigate, under the name HMS Espion as there was a ship named HMS Atalanta in service. For his lengthy and brave resistance, Linois was highly praised, particularly by the historian William James, who wrote in 1827 that Linois' "endeavours . . . were highly meritorious" and considered that in an engagement against a British frigate "the Atalante, if conquered at all, would have been dearly purchased." Shortly after his arrival in Britain, Linois was exchanged and returned to France.

== Notes ==
Footnotes

Citations

Bibliography
