= Charles-Auguste Levassor de La Touche-Tréville =

French Navy officer

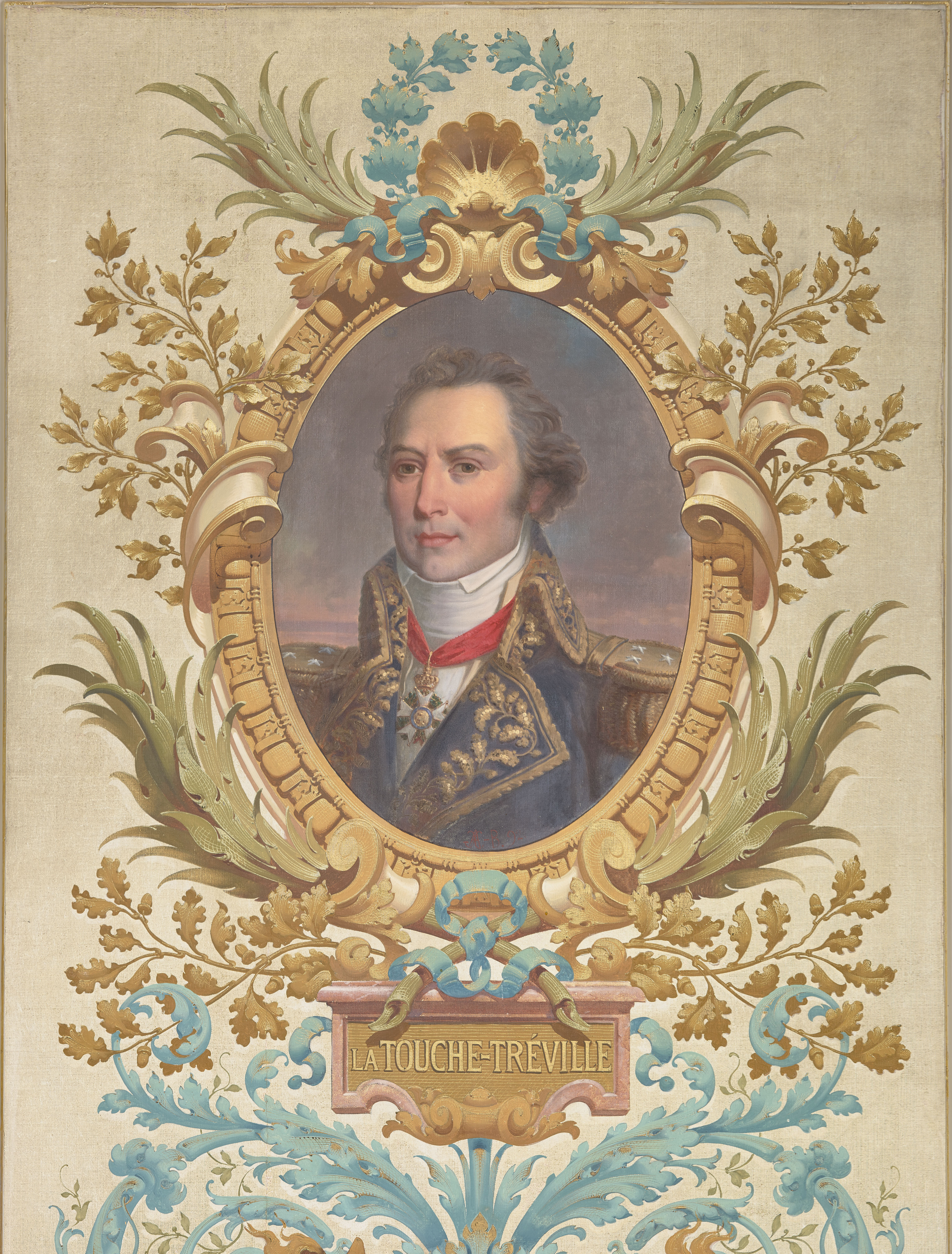

Charles-Auguste Levassor de La Touche-Tréville (1712–1788) was a French Navy officer.

== Career ==
Levassor de La Touche-Tréville enlisted in the Navy in 1730, rising to Ensign in 1734 and to Lieutenant in 1748.

On 11 March 1756, La Touche-Tréville commanded the 30-gun frigate Zéphir. She sailed in consort with the 74-gun Prudent, under Chevalier d'Aubigny, and the 34-gun frigate Atalante, under Count du Chaffault. The division met the 74-gun HMS Warwick; in the ensuing chase and Action of 11 March 1756, Warwick was captured.

On a journey from France to Martinique, La Touche-Tréville, while escorting a 22-sail convoy, captured two British merchantmen and a privateer. The convoy and the prizes safely reached Martinique.

He was promoted to captain in 1757. He commanded the 64-gun Dragon in Conflans' fleet and took part in the Battle of Quiberon Bay.

In October 1760, La Touche-Tréville commanded the pram Louise and harassed the British squadron blockading Île-d'Aix. His nephew Louis-René served aboard.

In late 1760, La Touche-Tréville transferred to the 74-gun Intrépide. He proposed a plan to free the mouth of the Charente River from the British blockade and executed it by attacking it with prams. The success of the plan allowed the fleet to sail to Martinique, in a desperate attempt to relieve it, but it arrived after the Invasion of Martinique.

La Touche-Tréville was promoted to chef d'escadre in 1776. In peacetime, he distinguished himself with elaborate training campaigns for the fleet.

At the outbreak of the American War of Independence, La Touche-Tréville took command of the 74-gun Neptune which, in consort with Beausset's 74-gun Glorieux, captured the British privateer Hercules (Note: Guérin (p.429) writes her name as Hercule, probably translating her name into French.)

Promoted to Lieutenant Général des Armées navales, La Touche-Tréville was appointed to command the light squadron of the Franco-Spanish fleet in 1779, under Admirals Orvilliers and Córdova. Scouting in front of the combined fleet, his screen captured a British warship (Note: Guérin (p.429) names her as the 64-gun Junon; as no HMS Juno or HMS Junon mounted 64 guns in this period, this is a mistake. 64-gun HMS Ardent was captured going down the Channel on August 17, 1779, and added to the French navy under the same name (recaptured at the Battle of the Saintes in 1782).)

In 1780, La Touche-Tréville successfully evaded detection by British squadrons and landed 6000 men at Rhodes Island.

La Touche-Tréville replaced his brother Louis-Charles as commander of the naval forces of Rochefort. He died in 1788.

== Sources and references ==
=== Bibliography ===
- Guérin, Léon (1845). Les marins illustres de la France (in French). Belin-Leprieur et Morizot.
