= Louis-René Levassor de Latouche Tréville =

French Navy officer and politician (1745-1804)

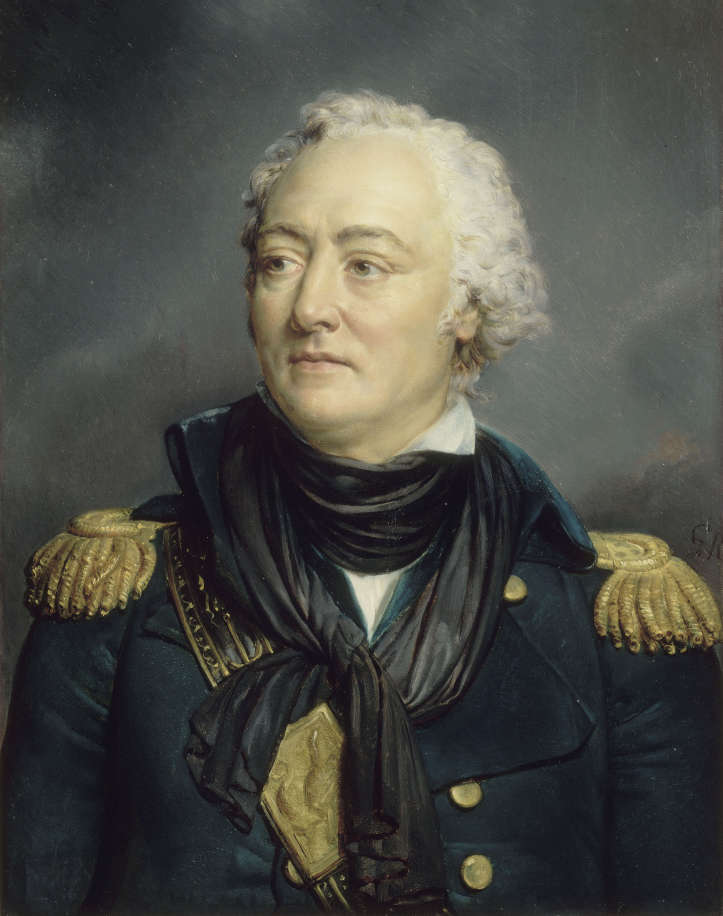
- Portrait by Georges Rouget, 1840
- Born: 3 June 1745; Rochefort, France
- Died: 19 August 1804 (aged 59); Toulon, France
- Relatives: Louis-Charles Le Vassor de La Touche (father); Charles-Auguste Levassor de La Touche-Tréville (uncle)
- Military career
- Allegiance: Kingdom of France; French First Republic
- Branch: French Navy
- Service years: 1758–1804
- Rank: Vice admiral
- Conflicts: Seven Years' War; Battle of Quiberon Bay; American Revolutionary War; Action of 7 June 1780 (WIA); Action of 21 July 1781; Action of 5 September 1782; Action of 15 September 1782 (POW); French Revolutionary Wars; Raids on Boulogne; Saint-Domingue expedition; Napoleonic Wars
- Awards: Commander of the Legion of Honour; Name inscribed on the Arc de Triomphe

Vice-Admiral Louis-René Madelaine Le Vassor, comte de Latouche-Tréville (French pronunciation: [lwi ʁəne madlɛn lə vasɔʁ kɔ̃t də latuʃ tʁevil]; 3 June 1745 – 19 August 1804) was a French Navy officer and politician who served in the American Revolutionary War and the French Revolutionary and Napoleonic Wars. Born into an aristocratic family of naval officers, Latouche enlisted in the French navy at the age of 13. He rose to become a competent frigate captain, engaging in several actions during the American Revolutionary War.

During the French Revolution, Latouche, a Freemason and aide to Phillipe Égalité, took progressive positions as a deputy in the Estates General and later in the National Constituent Assembly. His aristocratic status nevertheless made him a target during the Reign of Terror, and he was imprisoned and only freed from prison by the Thermidorian Reaction.

Returning to the Navy after a long period of unemployment, Latouche took command of the Flottille de Boulogne, where he repelled several raids on Boulogne led by Horatio Nelson. He then served in the Saint-Domingue expedition, which irrevocably compromised his health. After his return, he took command of the French fleet in Toulon, reorganising it into a potent tool again, but he succumbed to a relapse of illness before he had a chance to use it. Under his successor Pierre-Charles Villeneuve, the fleet he had refurbished was annihilated at the Battle of Trafalgar.

== Career ==
Latouche was born in Rochefort-sur-mer, Charente-Maritime. His father, Louis-Charles Le Vassor de La Touche, had been the governor of Martinique, until the Invasion of 1762, and chief of the naval forces of Rochefort. His uncle, Charles-Auguste Levassor de La Touche-Tréville, served as a rear-admiral, commanding the light squadron of the France-Spanish fleet under Orvilliers in 1780.

=== Early career ===
At the age of 13, Latouche joined the Gardes de la Marine, and took part in numerous naval actions during the Seven Years' War. He started sailing on the Hardi, ferrying troops to Canada in 1758, and took part in his first action, in 1759 aboard the 64-gun Dragon, which was under his uncle's command, taking part in the Battle of Quiberon Bay. He also served on the pram Louise and harassed the British squadron blockading Île-d'Aix in October 1760, still under his uncle. In 1762 he served on the 74-gun Intrépide and on Tonnant. In the summer of that year, Latouche was detached to command two gunboats with which he attacked two British ships, one 60-gun and one 74-gun, waging a two-hour battle.

After the Treaty of Paris in 1763, Latouche took part in training campaigns under his uncle Latouche-Tréville and Admiral d'Estaing, serving on the ships Garonne in 1763, and Hardi and Bricole in 1765.

In September 1768, aged 23, he was promoted to ensign. Perhaps under pressure from his family, who hoped for quicker promotions, or because the reform of the Navy forced him to retire, he resigned from the Navy and enlisted in the Army. He became an aide to Governor-General d'Ennery, newly appointed governor of Martinique, who obtained a commission as a cavalry captain for him. In 1771, he transferred as captain to the Régiment de La Rochefoucauld-Dragons, a dragoon regiment, and became aide-de-camp to Governor General Valière, who commanded at Saint-Domingue.

In 1772, Navy Minister Boynes acceded to repeated requests from Latouche's family, and he was reinstated in the Navy as "capitaine de brûlot". Latouche was appointed to command the fluyt Courtier. In 1774, Latouche put forward a proposition to the Ministry Navy for an exploratory expedition to circumnavigate Australia to see whether New Holland and New South Wales were separated by a channel; the plan was rejected, as the Ministry preferred using Île de France as the forward base for such an operation. Latouche corresponded with Captain Cook on exploration plans in 1775 and 1776.

=== Service on Hermione and the American War of Independence ===
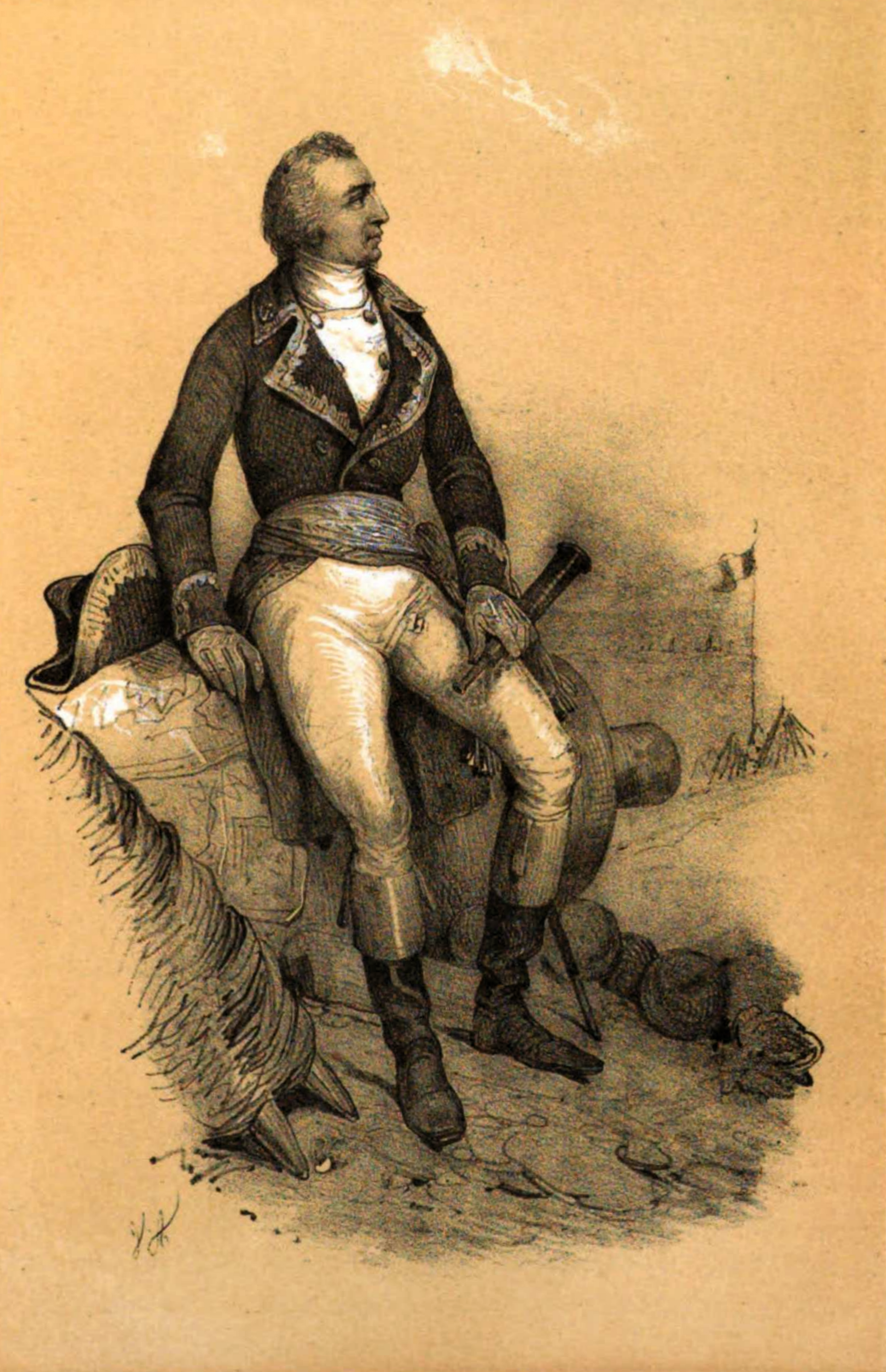
Latouche-Tréville as represented in Guérin's 1845 Marins Illustres

In May 1777, he was promoted to lieutenant and was given command of the 20-gun corvette Rossignol, which escorted convoys and ferried messages. He captured two British privateers and three merchantmen. His prizes saw him appointed Knight of the Order of Saint-Louis. He was appointed commander of the 26-gun frigate Hermione.

On 28 May 1779, Hermione spotted a British privateer, which she lured into a trap by feigning fleeing in the night. In order to induce a tiring chase, Latouche let his ship's beacon be glimpsed intermittently, before doubling back to attack his opponent in the morning. The privateer was the 18-gun Diffidence, of Falmouth. The next day, another 18-gun British privateer attacked and Latouche captured her too, using the same ruse. (Note: Guérin (p.431) indicates that her name signified Resolution of the Ladies of London, possibly meaning Ladies' Resolution of London.) Latouche then returned to Rochefort with his two prizes and numerous prisoners.

From 21 March to 28 April 1780, Latouche carried General Gilbert du Motier, Marquis de Lafayette as a passenger on a transatlantic voyage from France to Boston. Then, joining the fleet under Rear-Admiral Destouches, and under orders from Barras and Ternay, he directed the building of several artillery batteries for the defence of Rhode Island.

After he had completed the batteries, Latouche was allowed to cruise off Long Island and intercept shipping to New York City. He quickly captured two prizes, before spotting four sails on 7 June 1780: these were the frigate HMS Iris and three smaller warships. In the ensuing action of 7 June 1780, Latouche was himself shot in the arm by a musket ball, and Hermione suffered ten deaths and 37 wounded. (Note: In his biography of Latouche-Tréville, Hennequin (vol.2, p.108) gives a figure of 37 killed and 53 wounded. The figure of ten killed and 37 wounded comes from a lettre of Latouche-Tréville himself to his opponent, Captain James Hawker, quoted by Troude (vol.2, p.80).) His opponent, Captain James Hawker, later accused him of fleeing the scene, to which Latouche replied "In my poor state, I could not pursue you. Why then did you not continue the fight?" (Note: "Délabré comme je l'étais, je ne pouvais vous poursuivre. Pourquoi dès lors n'avez-vous pas continué le combat?" Quoted in Levot, p.295)

On 16 March, Latouche-Tréville participated in the Battle of Cape Henry, which took place at the mouth of Chesapeake Bay. This action has led to a commonly repeated, but erroneous, report that Latouche-Tréville engaged in a "battle against the Chesapeake (March 1781)". (Note: The error traces back to George Six's Dictionnaire Biographique des Généraux et Amiraux Français de la Révolution et de l'Empire 1792–1814. This is the usual source for the misattribution. For example, see: Granier, p.233) On 13 April 1781, Latouche's father, Louis-Charles Le Vassor de La Touche, died in Paris. Latouche inherited his peerage, and thereafter was styled "Comte de Latouche".

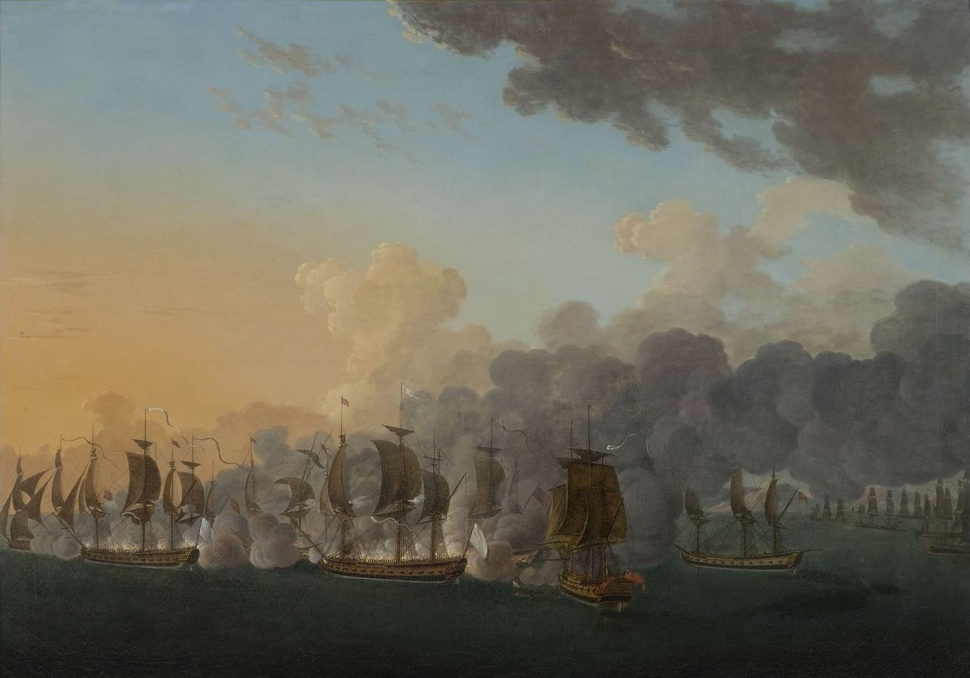
Naval battle of Louisbourg, 21 July 1781, by Auguste-Louis de Rossel de Cercy

He then continued cruising off the coast of North America as part of a squadron under the command of Admiral Lapérouse, whose flagship was Astrée.

On 21 July, the two frigates encountered a British convoy off the coast of Nova Scotia. In the resulting naval battle of Louisbourg, Astrée and Hermione forced HMS Charlestown to strike her colours, but failed to board her, allowing her to flee during the night. They did however capture the 14-gun escort, Jack, and three merchantmen, which they brought to Boston.

=== Service on Aigle ===
After returning to France, Latouche was promoted to captain on 20 June 1781. (Note: Latouche learned of his promotion in September, when Engageante arrived in America carrying the news.) In 1782, he was tasked with ferrying officials, large sums of money (Note: Hennequin (p.109) gives a figure of "three millions in gold", without specifying the currency unit; probably French livres. Three million livres amounted to the worth of six 74-gun ships of the line, for instance.) and equipment to America, leading a two-frigate squadron comprising Aigle and Gloire, under Captain de Vallongue.

Latouche assumed command of the frigate Aigle which, along with the Gloire, ferried funds and equipment for the fleet of Admiral de Vaudreuil. On 5 September 1782, the squadron encountered the lone 74-gun HMS Hector: in the ensuing two-day battle, the two frigates heavily damaged the Hector, and only failed to captured her when a British squadron appeared on the horizon. Latouche retreated, and Hector foundered a few days later.

=== Capture ===
The frigates continued on their journey when, on 12 September, they spotted a British squadron, comprising two ships of the line with a frigate, two corvettes and a brig-sloop. Latouche captured the brig, HMS Racoon. Latouche then tacked into the Delaware River, as HMS Vestal, HMS Bonetta, and the prize Sophie, led by Captain G.K. Elphinston in Warwick, gave chase. Latouche landed his passengers and treasure with launches from the frigates. He then attempted to escape his much stronger opponents by sailing over the banks at the mouth of the Delaware River, but Aigle ran aground; Gloire also touched bottom, but she managed to free herself and reach the channel. Latouche attempted to free Aigle, but with the retreating tide, she became not only more and more firmly beached, but also fell on her side, rendering her battery unserviceable. Seeing his ship lost, Latouche had her the masts chopped off and her hull pierced; he then evacuated her crew; staying behind with only a few men, Latouche fired a few shots from his stern chasers before striking his colours. Despite the measures to disable Aigle, the British were able to recover her and took her into service as HMS Aigle.

Admiral Vaudreuil wrote to the Minister of the Navy Castrie:

Mister de la Touche deserves your reprimand; he had on board with him a kept woman with whom he lived; the English, having captured her, have returned her to him as though she was his wife. This is known and cannot but make a bad impression in a country with good morals. (Note: "Monsieur de La Touche mérite que vous lui fassiez une réprimande; il avait dans un bâtiment à sa suite, une créature avec laquelle il vit; les Anglais l'ayant prise la lui ont renvoyée comme sa femme. Cela s'est su et ne peut faire qu'un mauvais effet dans un pays aux bonnes mœurs.")

Latouche was taken as a prisoner to New York, and transferred from there to England. He remained a prisoner until the Treaty of Paris in 1783.

=== Service in France during the Revolution ===
Upon Latouche's return in France, he was appointed to direct Rochefort harbour. He was also tasked with drawing a map of Oléron, which was published in the first volume of Hydrographie française. (Note: Latouche-Tréville was not, however, the author of two treatises, one on political economy and the other on agriculture; the author of those works was probably Jacques Antoine Creuzé-Latouche. See Levot, p.298.) In 1784 he succeeded Bruni d'Entrecasteaux as vice-director of the Harbours and Arsenals, holding the position until 1787, when he became Chancellor to the Duke of Orléans. Meanwhile, he had also served as an inspector for the gunnery school of the Naval Academy, and co-authored the Naval Code for 1786. In July 1786, he sailed a corvette from Honfleur to Le Havre, ferrying King Louis XVI.

His uncle, Charles-Auguste Levassor de La Touche-Tréville, died in 1788 and bequeathed him his name; henceforth, Latouche added "Tréville" to his name, becoming the "comte de Latouche-Tréville".

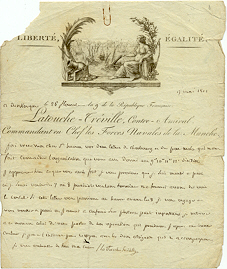
Letter by Latouche-Tréville

At the beginning of the French Revolution in 1789, Latouche-Tréville was elected deputy of the Nobility for the bailiwick of Montargis; he went on to sit at the National Constituent Assembly and held this position until it adjourned on 10 October 1791. Latouche took a liberal posture and was among the first nobles to join forces with the Third Estate. In September 1791, after king Louis XVI approved the new constitution, the National Constituent Assembly disbanded, and Latouche-Tréville resumed his naval activities.

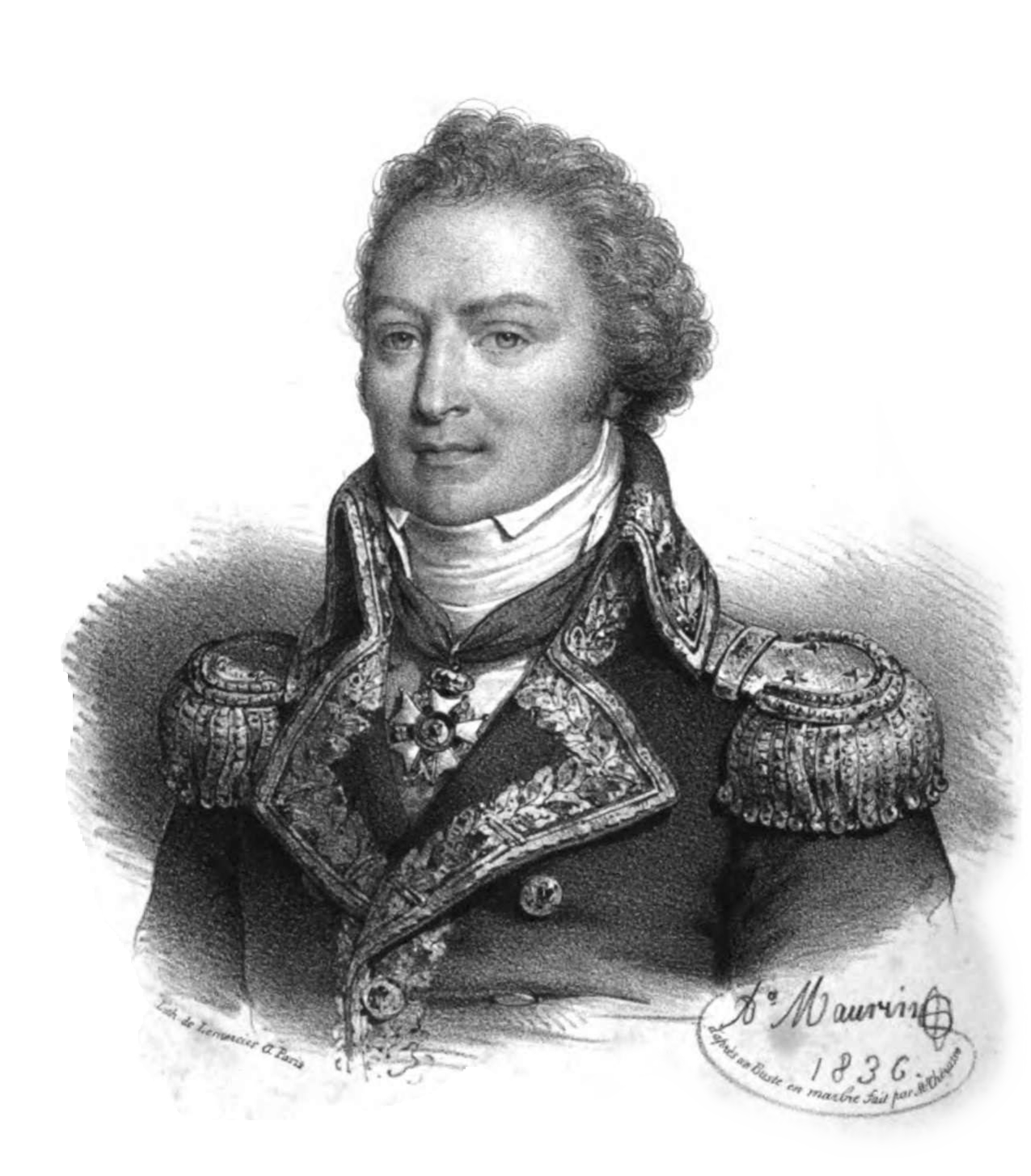
Portrait of Latouche-Tréville by Antoine Maurin

Latouche had held the rank of rear-admiral since 20 December 1790 reform of the navy. In this capacity, in 1792 he took command of a four-ship squadron in Brest. He sailed from Brest to Toulon, on his flagship the Languedoc, to attach his division to the Mediterranean squadron under Rear-admiral Truguet. He took part in raids against Oneglia, Cagliari and Nice during the Army of Italy, and joined in the attack on Sardinia in October 1792 (which turned out to be a failure when the expeditionary corps was repulsed). Latouche-Tréville and Truguet then returned to Toulon.

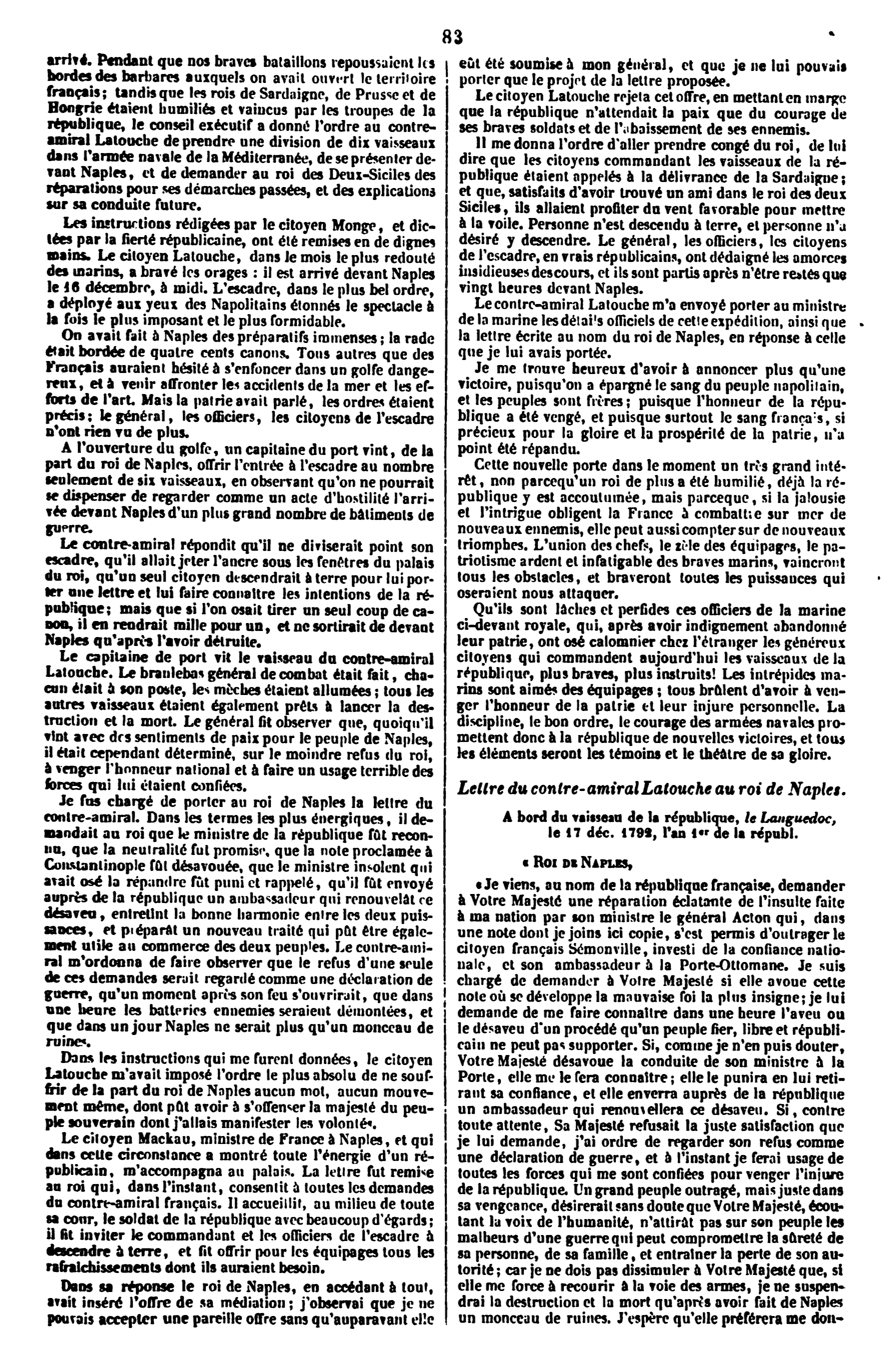
Le Moniteur Universel relates Latouche's mission to Naples.

Latouche-Tréville was promoted to rear-admiral on 1 January 1793. He was then sent on a mission to Naples, after that kingdom's ambassador to Constantinople had precipitated a diplomatic conflict by insulting his French counterpart. Latouche threatened to bombard the city, and obtained apologies from Ferdinand IV of Naples. Latouche then departed, but had to double back to Naples to repair due to gale-force winds, eventually making his rendezvous with Truguet on 8 February 1793. On 14 February, they landed 6,000 volunteers at Cagliari, who had to reembark under fire and in a gale two days later. The fleet then returned to Toulon once more.

In March 1793, amid the War of the First Coalition, Latouche took command of the "Naval Army of the Ocean" (the Brest fleet), but as soon as he took up his position, revolutionary subordinates denounced him as an aristocrat. On 15 September, at the height of the Reign of Terror, he was arrested as a "suspect" on orders of the Committee of Public Safety, and cashiered on 3 October. He spent one year in La Force Prison, and was freed only on 20 September 1794, after the Thermidorian Reaction.

Freed, Latouche returned to Montargis, where he was appointed chief of the Legion of the National Guard for the district. A Freemason, he rose to Vénérable in the Lodge Les Disciples d'Heredom et de la Madeleine Réunis, of Montargis. Latouche was rehabilitated under the Directoire and had his rank reinstated in December 1795, but nonetheless was left for five years without a command in the Navy. From 1797 to 1798, he managed equipment for the Navy with a ship-owner friend, and by 1799 he had grown so desperate that he advertised in Le Moniteur Universel for privateer captainships. It was not until 1799 that he returned to active duty.

=== Service at the Flottille de Boulogne ===
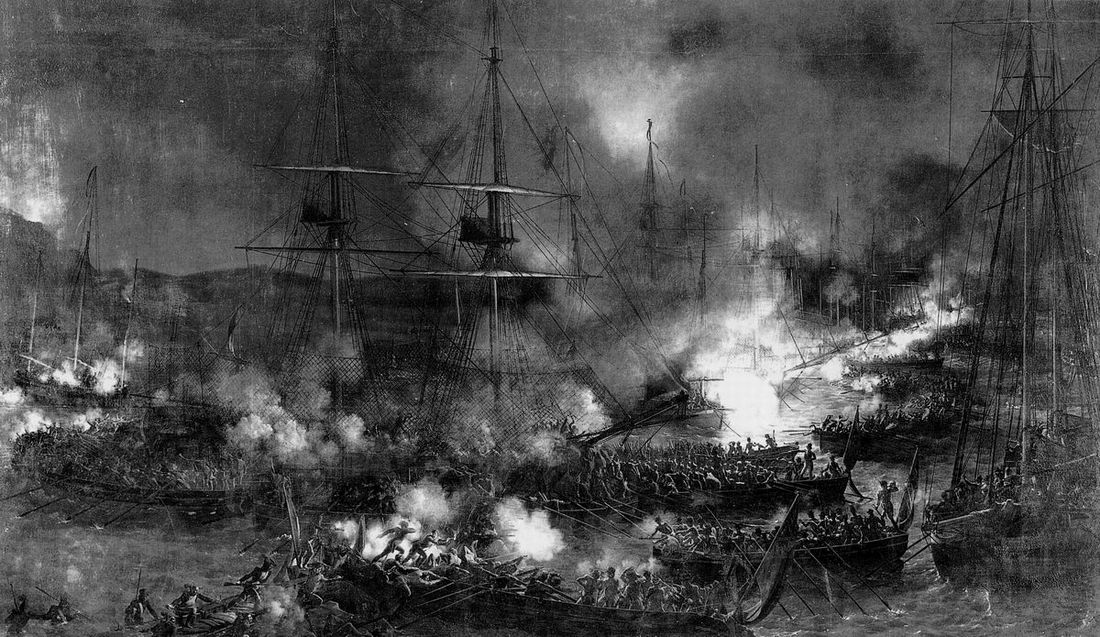
An illustration of the raid on Boulogne

In 1799, Latouche was appointed to lead a naval division in Brest, with his mark on the 74-gun Mont Blanc. Soon after, he was appointed to command the full Brest fleet, and transferred his flag onto the 110-gun Terrible. Latouche-Tréville defended the harbour until the government decided to disband the naval Army of Brest; Latouche-Tréville then sailed four of its ships to Rochefort.

Soon after, advised by Navy minister Forfait, First Consul Bonaparte chose Latouche-Tréville to organise and lead the Flottille de Boulogne. This vast fleet of small ships was ostensibly designed to ferry an invasion army to England, but was in fact a disinformation ploy to pressure the British into negotiating the Treaty of Amiens. The ploy helped to disguise the true goal of the French military, which was massing armies in Boulogne for an invasion of Austria. Soon after his arrival, on 4 August and 15 August 1801, Latouche-Tréville repelled raids on Boulogne that Admiral Horatio Nelson launched to destroy the Flottille.

=== Service at Saint-Domingue ===
In late 1801 Latouche was appointed to command the squadron in Rochefort, comprising six ships of the line, six frigates and two corvettes. The squadron formed part of a fleet under Vice-admiral Louis Thomas Villaret de Joyeuse, and embarked 3,000 troops of the Army of Rhine under General Jean Boudet before sailing to the French colony of Saint-Domingue in December 1801 as part of the Saint-Domingue expedition. Arriving at the colony in February 1802 with the rest of the fleet, Latouche participated in the capture of Port-au-Prince from the army of Toussaint Louverture, capturing the port's forts and landing the embarked troops. Capturing Léogâne as well, Latouche managed to obtain the peaceful surrender of General Laplume, while, in the south, General Charles Leclerc forced Louverture and Henri Christophe to submit to French authority.

With Villaret's departure in April 1802, Latouche stayed in Saint-Domingue with four ships of the line, nine frigates and five corvettes. In June 1802 plantation labourers revolted against French rule, which the yellow fever-stricken army of Leclerc was unable to defeat. Latouche defended the ports in the colony's south, appointing Jean-Baptiste Philibert Willaumez to the western naval station of Saint-Domingue. Heeding Leclerc's instructions to summarily execute Black troops in French service and prisoners of war, he wrote a letter to Willaumez on 16 October 1802 informing him that the conflict "pits whites against blacks. I took measures to ensure that prisoners no longer bother us and I encourage you to do them same." In February 1803, Latouche declared the rebellion would only end with "the destruction of the Negroes". The French situation grew even more desperate after Britain declared on France in May 1803, as Willaumez had to return to France to repair his frigate which was damaged in the action of 28 June 1803, and the British navy implemented a blockade of Saint-Domingue. In October 1803, Latouche obtained free passage from the British due to his poor health, and returned to France.

=== Service as commander of the fleet of Toulon ===
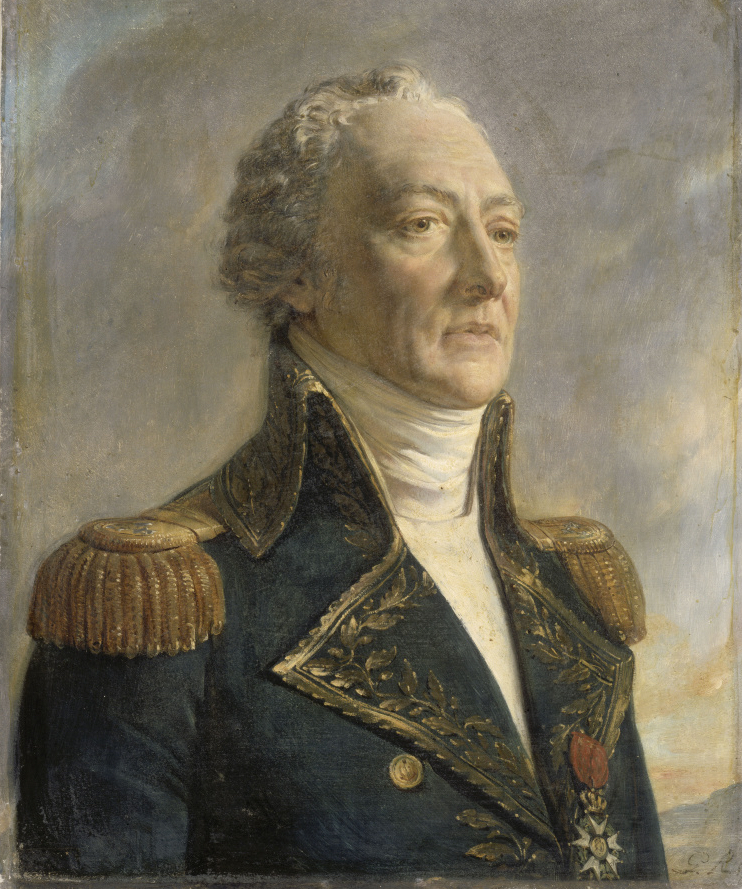
Portrait of Latouche-Tréville as a vice-admiral, in 1803. Louis Philippe I commissioned the painting for the History Museum of Versailles in 1835; Georges Rouget painted it in 1840.

Latouche-Tréville was made a vice-admiral in December 1803. Returned to France, he was appointed general inspector of the coasts of the Mediterranean, before taking command of the fleet of Toulon, with his flag on the brand-new 80-gun Bucentaure. At the time, the squadron counted only seven ships of the line and four frigates, and discipline was much weakened; in particular, Navy officers slept aboard their ships only when forced to do so by their duty. Latouche-Tréville made a point to live on his ship, and morale quickly improved under his example and leadership.

Latouche-Tréville decided to have one ship or frigate patrol for three days outside the harbour, in rotation, while another would always be ready to put to sail at the first signal. Furthermore, the entire squadron regularly scrambled to support other French warships whenever superior British forces ventured into Toulon harbour, preventing them from conducting useful reconnaissance of French activities in the area. Over the time, the squadron received three more ships of the line and three more frigates as reinforcements.

In late June 1804, Latouche-Tréville suffered a relapse of a medical condition contracted at Saint-Domingue. (Note: Hennequin (Biographie maritime, vol.2, p.112), Levot (Gloires maritimes de la France, p.297), Guérin (Marins illustres, p.629) and Taillemite (Dictionnaire des marins français, p.310) are all vague as to what exact medical condition is involved. Hennequin is the most precise on this question, stating that "around the last days of July, the symptoms of the disease that had required his return from Saint-Domingue to Europe became very obvious, and soon took an alarming turn." ("Vers les derniers jours du mois de juillet, les symptômes de la maladie qui avait nécessité son retour de Saint-Domingue en Europe se déclarèrent vivement, et bientôt elle prit un caractère alarment."). Levot states that Latouche "succumbed on Bucentaure to the consequences of the disease he had contracted at Saint-Domingue" ("Le 19 août 1804, il succombait sur le Bucentaure aux suites de la maladie qu'il avait contractée à Saint-Domingue").) However, he constantly refused to transfer ashore, stating "An admiral is only too glad when he can die under the flag of his ship." (Note: "Un amiral est trop heureux lorsqu'il peut mourir sous le pavillon de son vaisseau." Quote in Hennequin, p.112) Indeed, after a 10-day struggle, on 19 August, Latouche-Tréville died aboard Bucentaure. Nelson later wrote:

The French papers say he died of walking so often up to the signal-post to watch us: I always pronounced that would be his death.

== Legacy ==
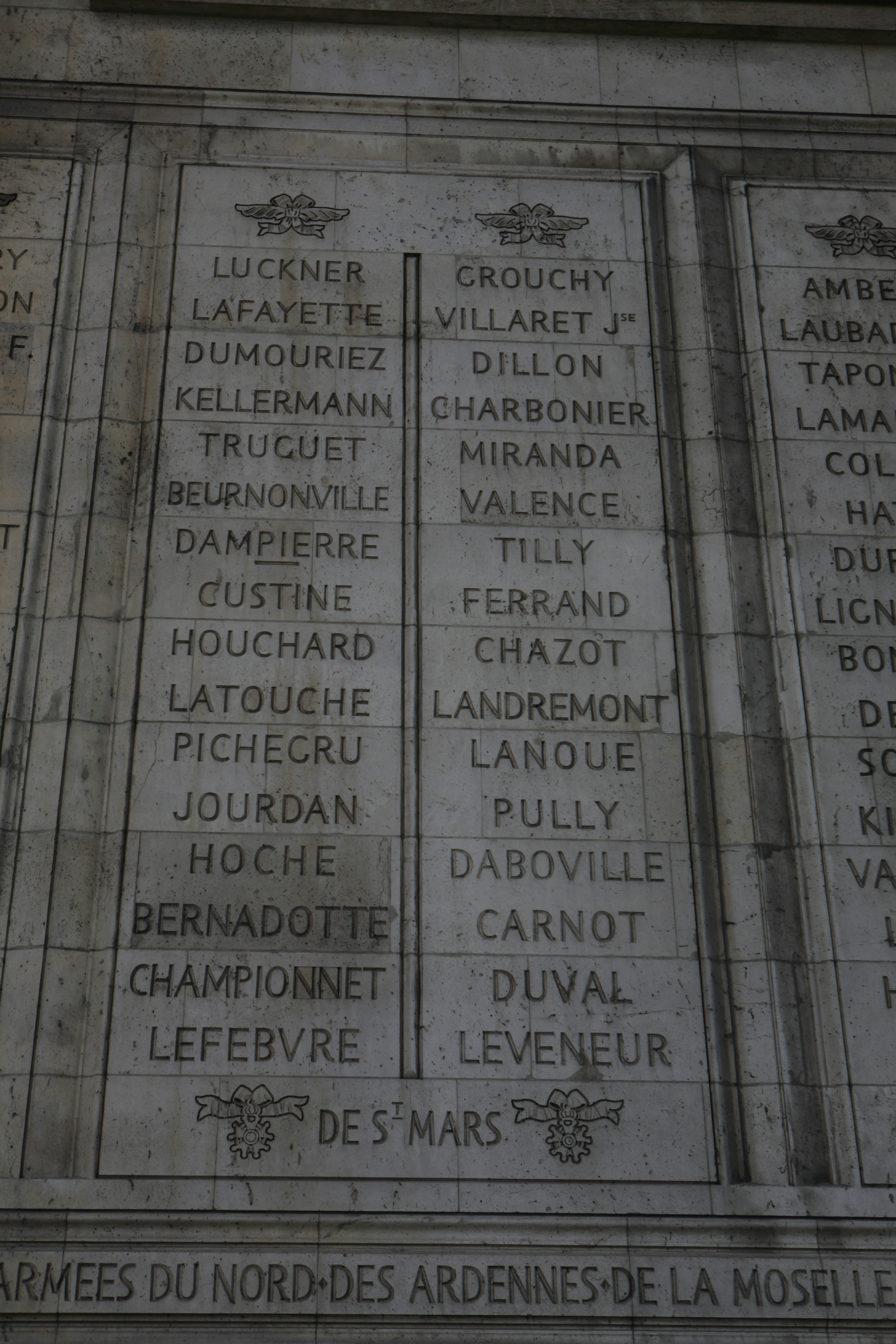
LATOUCHE inscribed on the Arc de Triomphe (left column, 10th from top)

Latouche-Tréville was buried in Toulon graveyard. In 1810, a seven-metre-high pyramidal mausoleum was built at the Sémaphore de la Croix des Signaux, at Cape Cépet, from where Latouche-Tréville had observed the British in his last year. On 14 October 1902, military authorities decided to move the mausoleum (Note: Allegedly, because they saw the mausoleum as a potential daymark for an enemy fleet. Emmanuel Davin, Les amis du vieux Toulon; quoted in Granier, p.249.) to the military graveyard of Saint-Mandrier-sur-Mer; the body was transferred on 29 April 1903.

French writers and historians have often compared Latouche-Tréville to Nelson, partly because the two admirals opposed each other during the raids on Boulogne and partly because, had it not been for his death, he would have opposed Nelson in the Trafalgar campaign. The name Latouche was inscribed on the north face of the Arc de Triomphe in his honour.

Three ships of the French Navy have been named Latouche-Tréville in his honour: the steam aviso Latouche-Tréville in 1860; the armoured cruiser Latouche-Tréville in 1892; and the F70-type destroyer Latouche-Tréville, which was withdrawn from service in 2022.

Ships of the French Navy named Latouche-Tréville
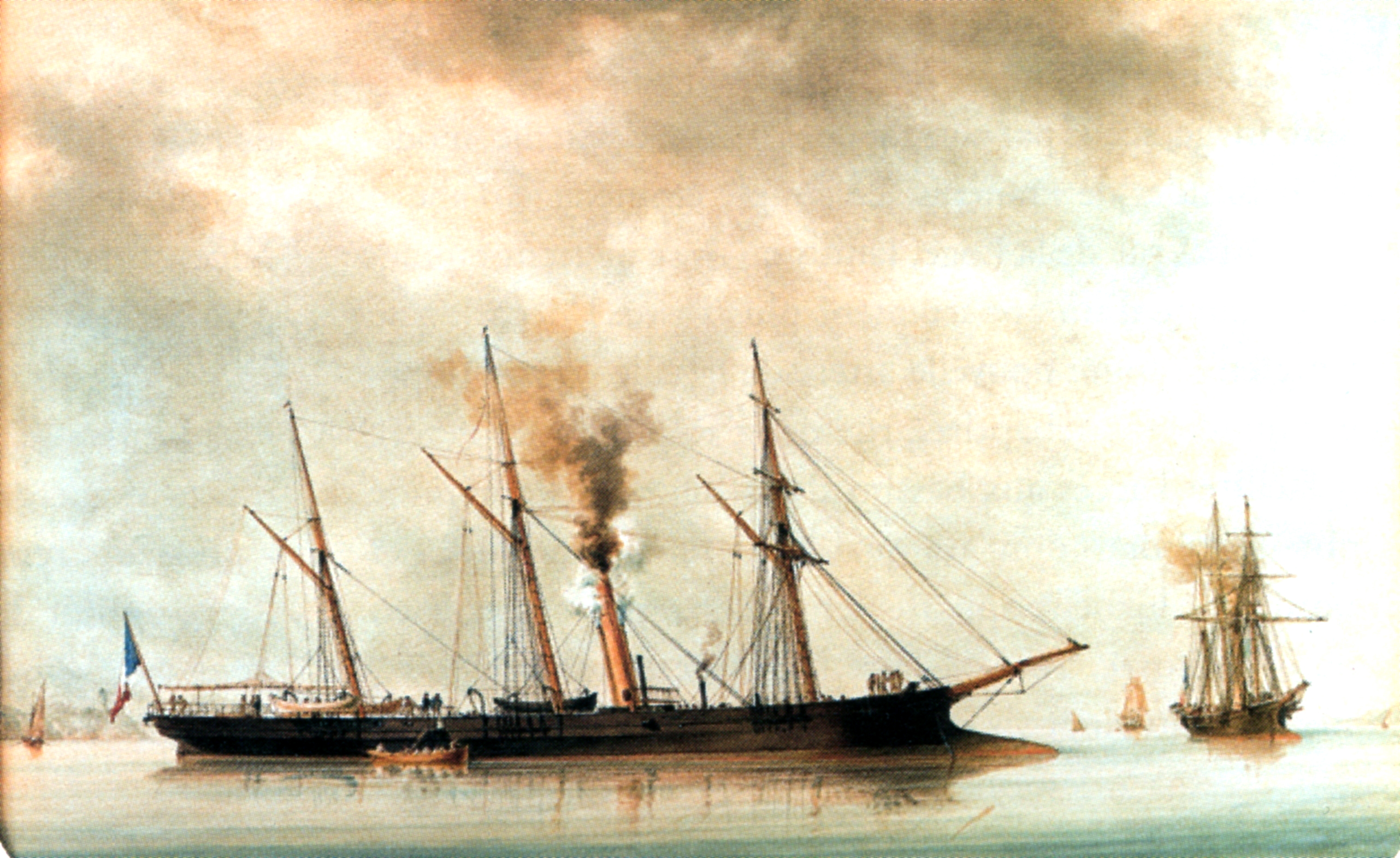
The steam 2nd-class aviso Renaudin, similar to the Latouche-Tréville (1860-1886)

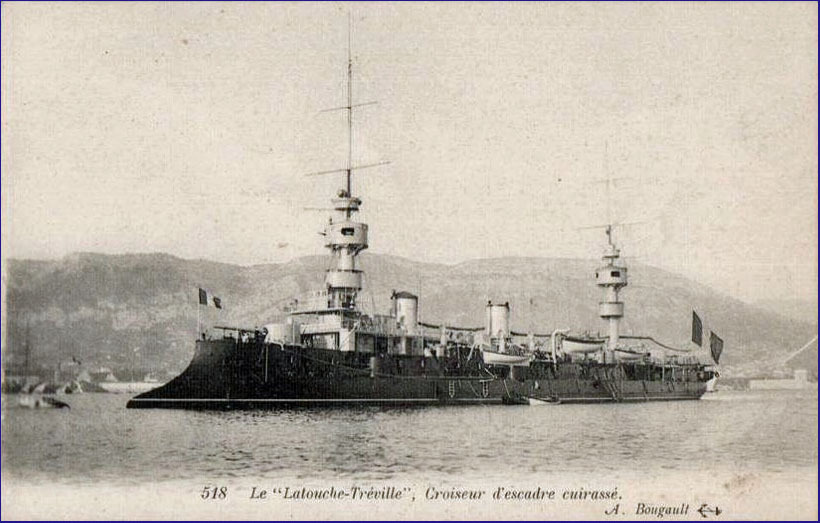
The armoured cruiser Latouche-Tréville

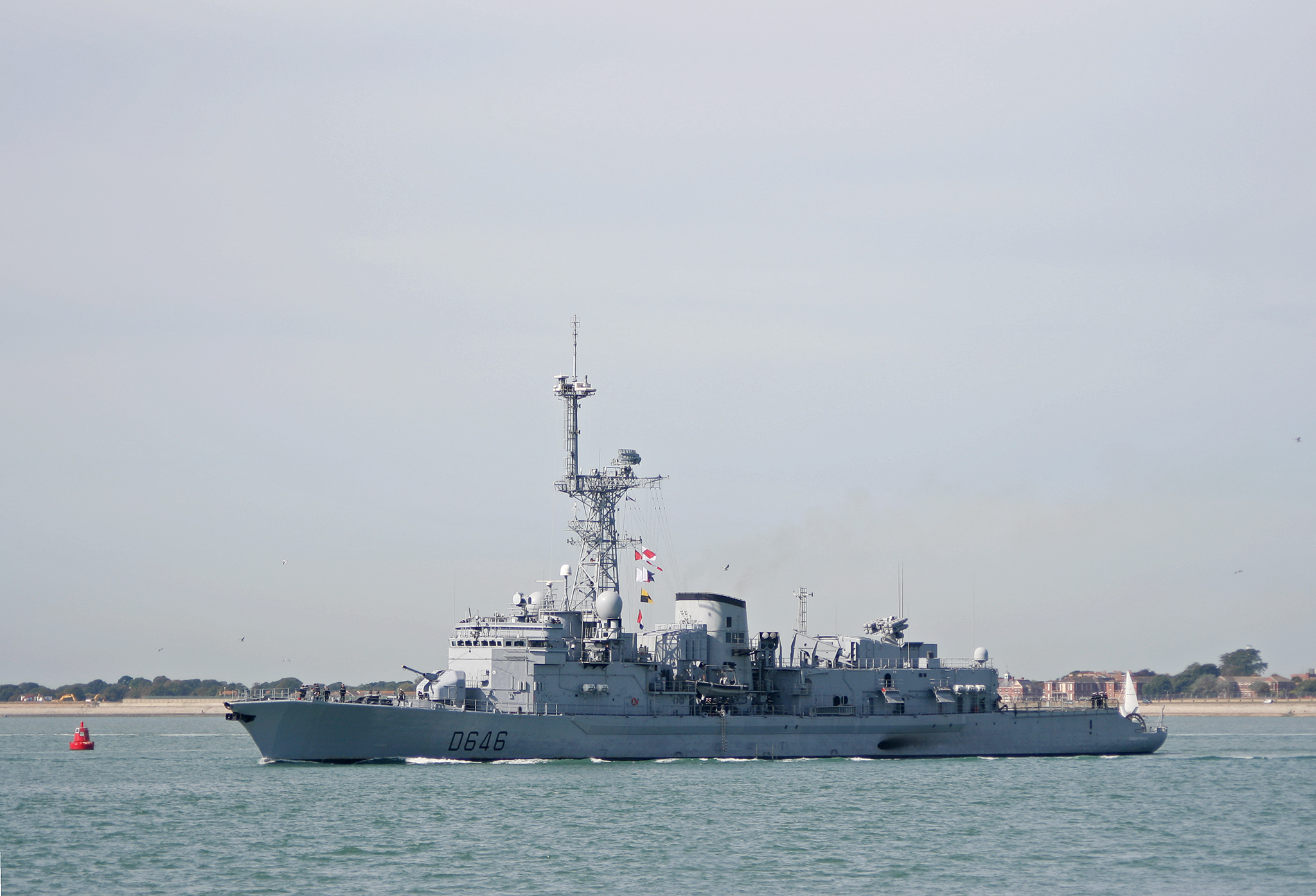
The F70-type destroyer Latouche-Tréville
