= List of ship launches in 1768 =

The list of ship launches in 1768 includes a chronological list of some ships launched in 1768.

| Date | Ship | Class | Builder | Location | Country | Notes |
|---|---|---|---|---|---|---|
| 21 March | Arend | Sixth rate | Jacob Spaans | Rotterdam | Dutch Republic | For Dutch Navy. |
| 20 April | Trident | Exeter-class ship of the line | William Pownall | Portsmouth Dockyard | Great Britain | For Royal Navy. |
| 22 April | San Vicente Ferrer | Third rate | Edward Bryant | Carthagena | Spain | For Spanish Navy. |
| April | Mouche | Cat | | Rochefort | Kingdom of France | For French Navy. |
| April | Ours | Cat | | Rochefort | Kingdom of France | For French Navy. |
| 2 May | San Isidro | San Isidro-class ship of the line | Reales Astilleros de Esteiro | Ferrol | Spain | For Spanish Navy. |
| May | Couronne | Saint-Esprit-class ship of the line | Chevallier Antoine Groignard | Brest | Kingdom of France | For French Navy. |
| 30 July | Barfleur | Barfleur-class ship of the line | Joseph Harris | Chatham Dockyard | Great Britain | For Royal Navy. |
| 30 July | Indien | Indien-class ship of the line | Gilles Cambry | Lorient | Kingdom of France | For French East India Company. |
| July | L'Oiseau | Chasse-marée | | Lorient | Kingdom of France | For Compagnie des Indes. |
| 3 August | César | César-class ship of the line | Chevallier Antoine Groignard | Toulon | Kingdom of France | For French Navy. |
| 29 August | Egmont | Third rate | Adam Hayes | Deptford Dockyard | Great Britain | For Royal Navy. |
| 30 August | Perle | Corvette | Pierre-Augustin Lamothe Lercaradec | Brest | Kingdom of France | For French Navy. |
| 28 September | Prudent | Exeter-class ship of the line | William Gray | Woolwich Dockyard | Great Britain | For Royal Navy. |
| 10 October | San Lorenzo | San Juan Nepomuenco-class ship of the line | Manuel de Zubiria | Guarnizo | Spain | For Spanish Navy. |
| 19 October | Flèche | Corvette | | Toulon | Kingdom of France | For French Navy. |
| 11 November | Flore | Frigate | | Brest | Kingdom of France | For French Navy. |
| 22 November | Den Prægtige | Third rate | Frederik Michael Krabbe | Copenhagen | Denmark-Norway | For Dano-Norwegian Navy. |
| 23 November | Aurore | Frigate | | Rochefort | Kingdom of France | For French Navy. |
| 9 December | San Agustín | Ship of the line | Manuel de Zubiria | Guarnizo | Spain | For Spanish Navy. |
| 10 December | Raisonnable | Ardent-class ship of the line | Joseph Harris | Chatham Dockyard | Great Britain | For Royal Navy. |
| 10 December | San Julián | San Isidro-class ship of the line | Reales Astilleros de Esteiro | Ferrol | Spain | For Spanish Navy. |
| Unknown date | Bellona | Sixth rate | | Amsterdam | Dutch Republic | For Dutch Navy. |
| Unknown date | Betsey | Guineaman | | Liverpool | Great Britain | For William James & Co. |
| Unknown date | Boreas | Sixth rate | | Amsterdam | Dutch Republic | For Dutch Navy. |
| Unknown date | Duke of Grafton | East Indiaman | John Wells | Deptford | Great Britain | For British East India Company. |
| Unknown date | Feth-i Zafer | Fifth rate | | | Ottoman Empire | For Ottoman Navy. |
| Unknown date | L'Ajax | Full-rigged ship | | Havre de Grâce | Kingdom of France | For private owner. |
| Unknown date | Sainte Reine | Sainte Reine-class gabarre | | Lorient | Kingdom of France | For Compagnie des Indes. |
| Unknown date | Cerf Volant | Corvette | | Rochefort | Kingdom of France | For French Navy. |
| Unknown date | Ecureuil | Corvette | | Brest | Kingdom of France | For French Navy. |
| Unknown date | Gange | Flûte | François Caro | Lorient | Kingdom of France | For Compagnie des Indes. |
| Unknown date | Vert Galant | Corvette | | Bordeaux | Kingdom of France | For French Navy. |
| Unknown date | Experience | Corvette | | Havre de Grâce | Kingdom of France | For French Navy. |
| Unknown date | Princess Auguste | Grab | | Bombay | India | For British East India Company. |
| Unknown date | Princess Royal | Grab | | Bombay | India | For British East India Company. |
| Unknown date | Queen | Ketch | | Bombay | India | For British East India Company. |
| Unknown date | Thetis | Sixth rate | | Amsterdam | Dutch Republic | For Dutch Navy. |
| Unknown date | Venus | Fourth rate | Peter Edwards | Amsterdam | Dutch Republic | For Dutch Navy. |
