= Edward O'Bryen =

Rear-Admiral Edward O'Bryen
- Born: c.1753 Unknown
- Died: 18 December 1808; Catisfield, Hampshire
- Military career
- Allegiance: United Kingdom
- Branch: Royal Navy
- Service years: c.1770–1803
- Rank: Rear-Admiral
- Commands: HMS Ferret; HMS Jamaica; HMS Resistance; HMS Southampton; HMS Windsor Castle; HMS Nassau; HMS Adamant; HMS Monarch; HMS Kent
- Conflicts: American Revolutionary War; French Revolutionary Wars; Nore Mutiny; Battle of Camperdown

Rear-Admiral Edward O'Bryen (sometimes O'Brien; c.1753 – 18 December 1808) was a British Royal Navy officer prominent in the late eighteenth century, who is best known for his participation at the Nore Mutiny and the Battle of Camperdown, both in 1797 during the French Revolutionary Wars. At the Nore, O'Bryen had recently been given command of the ship of the line HMS Nassau when the mutiny broke out. Although he was not the cause and the crew expressed their affection for him, O'Bryen had to be prevented from throwing himself overboard when his men refused to obey his orders. Just five months later, now in command of Vice-Admiral Richard Onslow's flagship HMS Monarch, O'Bryen led the southern division of the British attack at the Battle of Camperdown, in which a Dutch fleet was destroyed and British supremacy in the North Sea confirmed. Although he was praised for his exertions in the battle, O'Bryen's health was deteriorating and he retired from the Navy in 1803, dying at the rank of rear-admiral five years later.

== Life ==
Nothing is known of Edward O'Bryen's parents or childhood, and he first appears as a junior officer aboard the frigate HMS Aeolus during the early 1770s. He later moved to HMS Prudent in the East Indies and then in 1775 became a lieutenant, at which time he was at least 21 years old. He then served on a number of ships, including the galley HMS Ferret that fought under Lord Howe in Narragansett Bay in August 1778 and later HMS Ostrich and HMS Ambuscade in the Channel Fleet. In 1781 he sailed for the Caribbean in HMS Actaeon and two years later took over the sloop HMS Jamaica. In 1784 he was promoted to post captain and returned to Europe in HMS Resistance. He was then immediately placed on the reserve list on half-pay, not serving at sea again until 1795.

As O'Bryen lacked any influence at the Admiralty, he was forced to wait more than ten years for another commission, finally being given command of HMS Southampton in April 1795. In June of that year he transferred to HMS Windsor Castle, the flagship of Rear-Admiral Robert Mann. He was still in post in July 1796 when Man abandoned Gibraltar and returned to Britain without orders, inviting severe censure from the Admiralty, government and Admiral Sir John Jervis. Mann was dismissed from the service and O'Bryen had to wait until February 1797 for another ship, when he was given HMS Nassau at Yarmouth, flagship of Vice-Admiral Richard Onslow. Nassau was a disaffected ship, its men had been unpaid for the previous 19 months service, and when the Nore Mutiny broke out in May 1797, O'Bryen's authority was challenged and resisted by his crew. When the crew attempted to hang two men who would not join them, O'Bryen insisted that if anyone should die he would be the first and threatened to throw himself overboard. This checked the actions of the mutineers, but reportedly O'Bryen was left close to suicide. He left the ship shortly afterwards, and although the crew, who expressed their affection for him, invited him to return, he refused until the mutiny was over.

In July, Onslow and O'Bryen moved to HMS Monarch and on 11 October 1797 served with Admiral Adam Duncan's fleet at the Battle of Camperdown. Monarch lead the larboard division into action against the Dutch rear. O'Bryen's ship was heavily engaged, and fought successfully against the Dutch ships Jupiter, Haarlem and Monnikendam, all of which were eventually captured. Monarch suffered 136 casualties and O'Bryen was praised by King George III for his role in the battle. Monarch remained active in the North Sea during the remainder of 1797, but in 1798 O'Bryen was struck by the first of recurring bouts of ill-health and briefly retired ashore, returning briefly to service in 1801 to command HMS Kent in the Mediterranean. O'bryen retired permanently from the Navy in 1803.

O'Bryen subsequently lived with his wife Mary Alsop and their daughter, also named Mary, at Catisfield in Hampshire until his wife's death in 1807, shortly after which he was married to Martha Charlotte Bradbury. O'Bryen was promoted to rear-admiral in 1805, but ill-health prevented any return to the sea and he died in December 1808, acknowledging an illegitimate son named James Cavendish in his will.

There is a memorial of the O'Bryen family by the west window in St Edmunds Crofton Old Church in Stubbington, Hampshire which includes one to Rear-Admiral O'Bryen.
