= HMS Resistance (1782) =

Fifth-rate ship of the Royal Navy

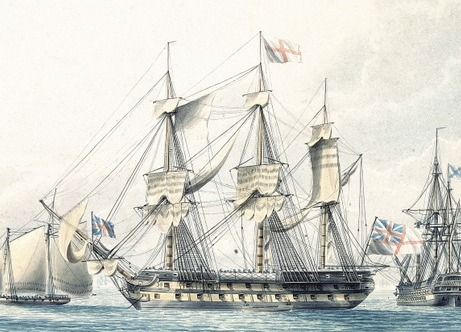
- Resistance's sister ship HMS Argo

History

Great Britain
- Name: HMS Resistance
- Ordered: 29 March 1780
- Builder: Edward Greaves, Limehouse
- Cost: £21,001
- Laid down: April 1781
- Launched: 11 July 1782
- Completed: 17 August 1782
- Commissioned: March 1782
- Fate: Accidentally blown up, 24 July 1798

General characteristics
- Class & type: Roebuck-class fifth-rate
- Tons burthen: 894 84/94 (bm)
- Length: 140 ft 2 in (42.7 m) (gundeck); 116 ft (35.4 m) (keel)
- Beam: 38 ft 1 in (11.6 m)
- Draught: 10 ft 2 in (3.1 m)
- Depth of hold: 16 ft 4 1/2 in (5 m)
- Propulsion: Sails
- Complement: 300
- Armament: Lower deck: 20 × 18-pounder guns; Upper deck: 22 × 12-pounder guns; Quarterdeck: Nil; Forecastle: 2 × 6-pounder guns

HMS Resistance was a 44-gun fifth-rate Roebuck-class ship of the Royal Navy launched in 1782. Based on the design of HMS Roebuck, the class was built for use off the coast of North America during the American Revolutionary War. Commissioned by Captain James King, Resistance served on the West Indies Station for the rest of the war. She captured the 24-gun corvette Coquette on 2 March 1783 and then went on in the same day to participate in the unsuccessful Battle of Grand Turk alongside Horatio Nelson. Resistance then went for a refit in Jamaica, during which time King fell ill and was replaced by Captain Edward O'Bryen. O'Bryen commanded Resistance until March 1784 when she was paid off. In 1791 she was recommissioned as a troop ship, but was converted back into a warship in 1793 at the start of the French Revolutionary War, under Captain Edward Pakenham.

Resistance was sent to serve on the East Indies Station, where she was present at the capture of the 34-gun frigate Duguay Trouin on 5 May 1794. She then participated in the capture of Malacca on 17 August 1795. She was similarly part of the force that captured Amboyna Island on 16 February 1796, and Banda Neira on 8 March. Continuing the campaign to capture Dutch possessions in the East Indies, Resistance took Kupang, Timor, on 10 June 1797, but the native population rebelled against the new temporary governor. Pakenham fired on the town and then sent a landing party in to regain control, destroying most of Kupang in the process.

On 21 July 1798 Resistance cut out a Malay merchant sloop, and after ascertaining the legal ownership of the vessel, sailed to Bangka Strait to return her to her captain. Arriving on 23 July, Resistance anchored in the evening. At 1 a.m. on 24 July, Resistance suddenly caught fire and exploded, killing 332 people. Of the thirteen survivors, only four successfully reached Sumatra on a makeshift raft. Enslaved by local pirates, they were eventually rescued by the Sultan of Lingga.

== Design and construction ==
Resistance was a 44-gun, 18-pounder Roebuck-class ship. The class was a revival of the design used to construct the fifth-rate HMS Roebuck in 1769, by Sir Thomas Slade. The ships, while classified as fifth-rates, were not frigates because they carried two gun decks, of which a frigate would have only one. Roebuck was designed as such to provide the extra firepower a ship of two decks could bring to warfare but with a much lower draught and smaller profile. From 1751 to 1776 only two ships of this type were built for the Royal Navy because it was felt that they were anachronistic, with the lower (and more heavily armed) deck of guns being so low as to be unusable in anything but the calmest of waters. (Note: This problem was demonstrated in a sister ship of Resistance, HMS Argo, which two French frigates captured in 1783 because the weather was so bad she was not able to open her lower gun ports during the battle.) In the 1750s the cruising role of the 44-gun two deck ship was taken over by new 32- and 36-gun frigates, leaving the type almost completely obsolete.

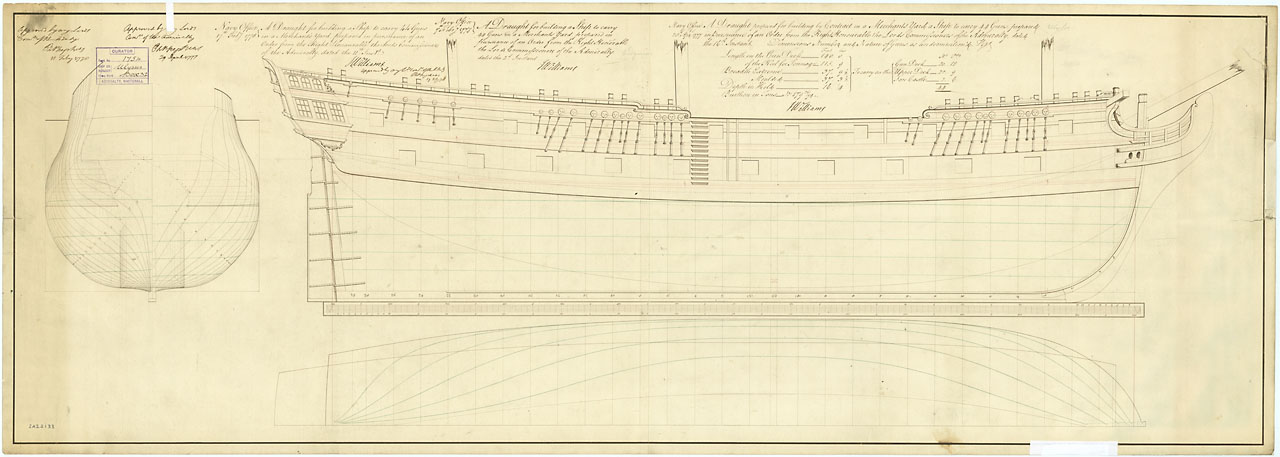
Plan of the Roebuck-class ships

When the American Revolutionary War began in 1776 a need was found for heavily armed ships that could fight in the shallow coastal waters of North America, where two-decked third-rates could not safely sail, and so the Roebuck class of nineteen ships, alongside the similar Adventure class, was ordered to the specifications of the original ships to fill this need. The frigate classes that had overtaken the 44-gun ship as the preferred design for cruisers were at this point still mostly armed with 9- and 12-pounder guns, and it was expected that the class's heavier 18-pounders would provide them with an advantage over these vessels. Frigates with larger armaments would go on to be built by the Royal Navy later on in the American Revolutionary Wars, but these ships were highly expensive and so Resistance and her brethren continued to be built as a cheaper alternative.

While most of Roebuck's design was carried over to the new ships, some aspects were changed to reflect the changes in technology that had occurred in the passing years. Roebuck and the ships of the class ordered before 1782 were armed with twenty-two 9-pounder guns on their upper decks, but in that year the class was rearmed with more powerful 12-pounders, the same year Resistance was launched. As well as this change in armament, all ships laid down after the first four of the class had the double level of stern windows removed and replaced with a single level of windows, moving the style of the ships closer to that of a true frigate. (Note: While the earlier ships of the class had two levels of stern windows, there was only ever one level of cabins behind them.)

All but one ship of the class was contracted out to civilian dockyards for construction, and the contract for Resistance was given to Edward Greaves at Limehouse. She was ordered on 29 March 1780, laid down in April 1781 and launched on 11 July 1782 with the following dimensions: 140 feet 2 inches (42.7 m) along the gun deck, 116 feet (35.4 m) at the keel, with a beam of 38 feet 1 inch (11.6 m) and a depth in the hold of 16 feet 4 1/2 inches (5 m). Her draught, which made the class so valued in the American Revolutionary War, was 10 feet 2 inches (3.1 m). She measured 894 84/94 tons burthen. The fitting out process for Resistance was completed, including the addition of her copper sheathing, on 17 August at Deptford Dockyard.

== Service ==
=== American Revolutionary War ===
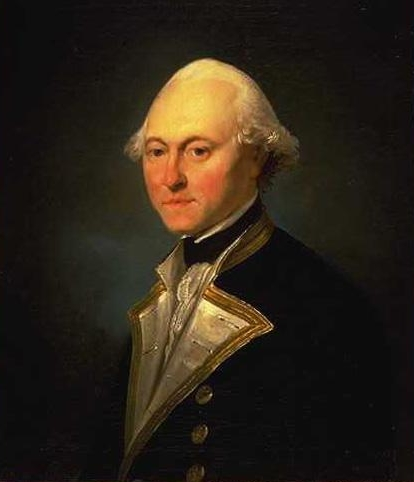
Resistance's first captain, James King

Resistance was first commissioned in March 1782 under the command of Captain James King. Having been fitted out, she sailed to Long Reach on 17 September where she took her armament and gun powder aboard. Preparations for service were completed on 29 September. She was sent to join the West Indies Station, sailing there from Spithead in control of a convoy of 500 merchant ships on 11 November, the responsibility and stress of which turned King's hair grey. (Note: The number of merchantmen in the convoy is unsure; by the time of their arrival there were 32 left.) They arrived at Carlisle Bay, Barbados, on 12 December. Resistance then went patrolling off Jamaica with the 18-gun sloop HMS Duguay Trouin; on 9 February 1783 they encountered a squadron consisting of a ship of the line, two frigates, and a sloop, one of which flew a French flag, however upon investigation it was found that the squadron was a British one with a French prize. Resistance captured her first prize on 16 February when she caught the American merchantman Fox as the latter attempted to sail to Hispaniola.

Resistance continued in company with Duguay Trouin, and on 2 March they were sailing through Turk's Island passage when they discovered two French warships at anchor there. The enemy vessels made to escape from the British ships, but as the rearmost ship began to sail away, she lost her mainmast. This ship was a 20-gun vessel, and Resistance soon came up with the stationary vessel and fired a broadside from her upper deck guns into her before moving on in chase of the other French ship, the 24-gun corvette La Coquette. The chase went on for fifteen minutes before Resistance managed to sail to leeward of La Coquette, at which point the French warship surrendered. King put La Coquette under the command of Lieutenant James Trevenen and continued on his patrol. On 6 March the ships captured a Danish brig and on 8 March they captured two more merchant vessels, including the American ship Hope, all of which were sent to Port Royal.

La Coquette had been part of a French squadron that had captured the island of Grand Turk on 12 February, and later on 6 March Resistance and her consorts met near there with the 26-gun frigate HMS Albemarle and 14-gun brig-sloop HMS Drake. Albemarle was commanded by Captain Horatio Nelson, who was senior to King and took command of the group. Nelson decided to attempt to take back Grand Turk from the French, and early on 8 March a landing was made by a group of 250 seamen and marines under the cover of the guns of two brigs also attached to the squadron. The ships were fired upon by a 3-gun battery as they closed in on the land, and the French garrison met the landing party as it arrived, attacking it with more cannon. The Battle of Grand Turk was unsuccessful and the landing party was forced to return to their ships, the island untaken. On the following night it was decided that another attack would be made, this time with the larger ships of the squadron attacking the gun batteries first. Before this plan could be put into action the wind changed and made it impossible for the ships to stay on station, and the attempt was abandoned. After stopping at Jamaica on 13 March, Resistance sailed to Port Royal with Albemarle the next day to undergo a three-month refit, during which time King lived ashore.

King's health started to rapidly deteriorate, and at one point he went six weeks without stepping onboard Resistance because of this. He resigned command of the ship on 14 June. On 6 August King's replacement, Captain Edward O'Bryen, took command of Resistance; O'Bryen commanded Resistance into 1784 before sailing her to England to be paid off in March of that year. (Note: King went to Nice to attempt to recuperate in 1783, but died there in October 1784.) She received a repair at Portsmouth Dockyard between July and December 1785 at the cost of £6,945, but was not immediately put back into service, the American Revolutionary War having ended.

=== Troop ship ===
With the wartime necessity of using the obsolete ships as frontline warships now at an end, most ships of Resistance's type were taken out of service. While lacking modern fighting capabilities, the design still provided a fast ship, and so the Comptroller of the Navy, Sir Charles Middleton, pressed them into service as troop ships. Resistance was recommissioned as such in February 1791 under the command of Commander John O'Bryen, still at this point situated at Portsmouth. She was fitted out for her new role between March and April, and sailed with soldiers for Gibraltar on 2 May. Despite being reconfigured to carry men and supplies, Resistance was still recorded as a warship and was armed en flute at this time, with twenty 9-pounders and four 6-pounders. On 27 May she left Gibraltar to convey a force including Prince Edward and his mistress Madame de Saint-Laurent to Canada, arriving in the St Lawrence River on 11 August.

Resistance was subsequently recommissioned as a warship at Portsmouth in June 1793 under Captain Edward Pakenham. The Royal Navy had built twenty-seven 44-gun two-decked ships for the American Revolutionary War, but with the war having ended before most had seen much service, they were some of the newest and best condition ships available to the navy. With the French Revolutionary Wars having begun, Resistance was pushed quickly into service to fill the gap left by a lack of available 18-pounder frigates, despite her class by this point being completely unsuited to the task. She stayed at Portsmouth between July and August to be refitted and subsequently sailed to join the East Indies Station on 28 November. (Note: The 44-gun two-deckers were re-established as warships but their limited abilities were recognised and they were predominantly sent to serve on the more distant and minor Royal Navy stations during the French Revolutionary Wars.)

=== French Revolutionary War ===
By February 1794 Resistance was cruising off the Cape of Good Hope with the 50-gun fourth rate HMS Centurion and 32-gun frigate HMS Orpheus. There they rendezvoused with the 74-gun ship of the line HMS Suffolk, the flagship of Commodore Peter Rainier and joined him in sailing to the East Indies as escort to a large convoy. By 5 May Resistance had reached the station, patrolling with Centurion and Orpheus. Pakenham spotted two ships off Round Island near Mauritius; Orpheus was the closest vessel and she chased the pair, coming up with one of them at 11:35 a.m. This enemy was the French 34-gun frigate Duguay Trouin, and Orpheus engaged her until 1:30 p.m. when Resistance and Centurion finally began to close in, being slower, at which point Duguay Trouin surrendered. (Note: The other ship present was the brig-corvette Vulcan.) Resistance then captured the 18-gun ship Revanche in the Sunda Strait in October.

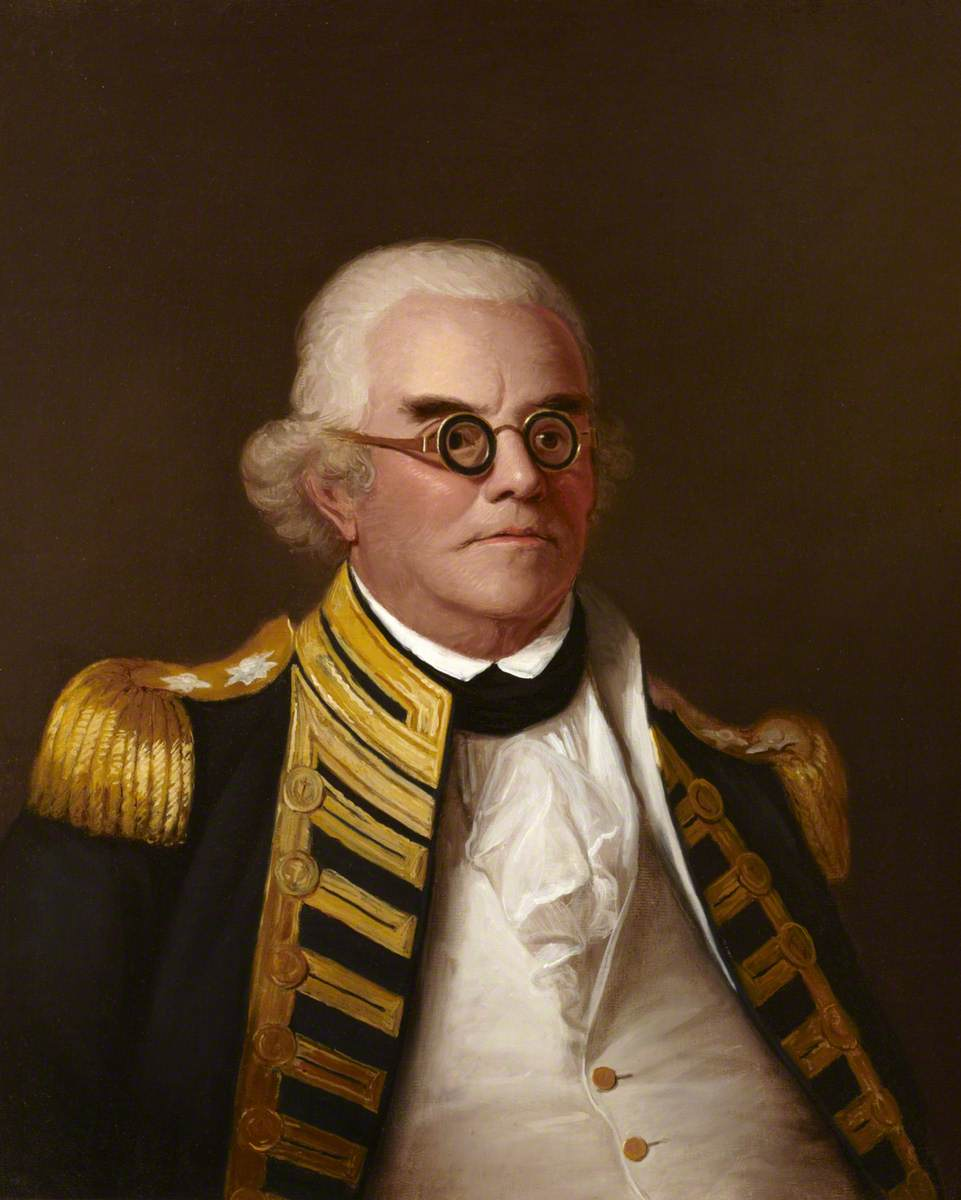
Vice-Admiral Peter Rainier, commander of the East Indies Station throughout Resistance's service there

Resistance was sent to Bombay in January 1795 as escort to a convoy, where she re-provisioned herself and sailed on trade prevention duties. In March she then joined with Rainier in Suffolk to protect a convoy through the Strait of Malacca as it returned from China. Having completed this task, Resistance was detached from Madras on 21 July so that she could take a troop ship and a transport to join the invasion expedition for Malacca, which had already sailed under Captain Henry Newcome of Orpheus. Resistance reached the expedition by 13 August but then left it again, returning on 17 August, two days after the main force had reached Malacca. The expedition launched the attack only after Resistance's return, with her employed in attacking the Dutch East India Company ship Constantia which had been beached just inside the port. After a token period of defence Constantia quickly surrendered. At 7 p.m. Newcome landed the troops the expedition had conveyed with them, who reached the shore at 9 p.m.; half an hour later a representative of Malacca came onboard Orpheus and surrendered, with little violence having occurred. Around the same time as this occupation took place, another expedition captured Trincomalee. These were the first in a string of island captures by the Royal Navy; Resistance left Malacca on 6 January 1796 as part of an invasion force led by the now-Rear-Admiral Rainier, and on 16 February they arrived off Amboyna Island, which surrendered immediately. The force left Amboyna on 5 March and sailed to Banda Neira, arriving there on 7 March. Early in the afternoon of 8 March a landing party captured the island after a short defence by the Dutch garrison forces there. (Note: Pakenham's share of the prize money from these two captures was £15,000.)

By the end of the year Rainier's naval resources were being stretched thin by demands from the Admiralty and to cover his newly captured possessions he left behind Resistance and three sloops on 8 December, as he manoeuvred to concentrate on protecting trade from Macao. Resistance mostly cruised off Timor and the Maluku Islands to accomplish this goal, but Pakenham had also been ordered to use his force to capture Timor and any other settlements when the opportunity arose. On 17 February 1797 Resistance arrived at Ternate alongside the Bombay Marine's 38-gun frigate HCS Bombay, and the 10-gun brig HMS Amboyna. Pakenham presented the Dutch governor of the city with a demand for a peaceful surrender, promising that the freedoms and properties of the population would not be harmed if he agreed. After a period of confusion because nobody there spoke English, the request was declined and the Dutch prepared to defend the city, but Resistance and her consorts sailed away and instead peacefully took the town of Manado.

On 10 June, cooperating with the 16-gun snow HCS Intrepid, Resistance secured the primary Dutch settlement on Timor, Kupang, after the officials there voted to surrender. (Note: Charles Rathbone Low reports that the ship accompanying Resistance was HCS Bombay and not Intrepid.) A temporary governor was appointed from the East India Company and sent ashore under the guard of a group of sepoys and marines. The local population were then either persuaded or commanded by some of the Dutch residents to attack this new garrison, with the signal being Pakenham's expected arrival on shore. (Note: There is debate as to why the uprising at Kupang occurred; the attack may have been a general conspiracy by the Dutch and their native followers to take back the island or an attempt by the Dutch second-in-command, a Mr Greeving, to remove the British from the island so that his fraudulent work with the Dutch East India Company could not be discovered.) At the last moment Pakenham decided against visiting the governor but he still sent his boat, and on its arrival the natives attacked, killing sixteen people. In revenge for this Pakenham had Resistance fire on the settlement, and under cover of this fire he sent a strong landing party to attack, the combination of which killed around 200 of the natives and forced the rest to flee. The town was almost completely destroyed; the European, mostly Dutch, part of the population had escaped at the first sign of violence, and Pakenham chose to abandon Kupang. On 7 September Pakenham reported to Rainier that Resistance was hardly seaworthy, such was the poor state of her masts and rigging.

Despite this Resistance continued in her duties, and in October she had a successful month of prizetaking against the Dutch; the 10-gun sloop Yonge Frans was cut out from Ternate, while the 4-gun sloop Juno was captured as she attempted to enter that port. Off Limbi Island the 10-gun sloop Yonge Lansier was captured, and then the 6-gun ketch Limbi was taken at Celebes. Resistance's boats then captured the 10-gun sloop Waaker at Gonontalo Island off Celebes, with Resistance herself capturing the 6-gun brig Resource off Kupang. Also taken in this period was the 4-gun brig Ternate and several large, but unnamed, local trading vessels.

Towards the end of December Resistance sailed through a storm for four days and began to leak badly, to the extent that several of her guns were thrown overboard to increase buoyancy. She sailed for the Philippines and arrived off the fortified port of Antego, Panay, flying a false Spanish flag on 24 December. Seeing this supposedly friendly ship, the deputy governor of the town and the captain of a Spanish brig that was sheltering there both took boats out to Resistance, where they were detained. The men agreed to provide Pakenham with food, water, and wood, and in return he had them released. The men reneged on their promise, and so at 5 p.m. on 25 December a party from Resistance cut out the Spanish brig from the bay.

The brig was quickly taken out of range of the gun batteries on land, and the two ships then sailed for Balambangan Island, arriving there on 29 December. From here Resistance sailed to Celebes from where the brig was sent to Amboyna with a request for provisions to be sent out to the ship so that she could continue on. Bombay met with Resistance off Booloo, one of the Riau Islands, towards the end of January 1798 and finally managed to adequately provision the ship. Resistance then sailed to Amboyna, where she spent two months in a refit. Having made one aborted attempt to leave Amboyna that was stopped by a sudden leak, the ship left the island in July. On 20 July Resistance encountered a pirate fleet off Bangka Island and attempted to board some of the vessels to search them, but the pirates refused to let their parties do so. Pakenham had Resistance fire at the pirates afterwards, and thus forced them to disperse.

In the morning of 21 July Resistance cut out a Malay merchant sloop that had been earlier captured by the pirates, and Pakenham took it with him as they attempted to discover the true ownership of the vessel, with the captain kept on board to ensure that his ship would stay sailing with them. The sloop soon fell behind Resistance, in which time it had been decided that the sloop's captain was her rightful owner and that he should be restored to her as soon as possible.

== Fate ==
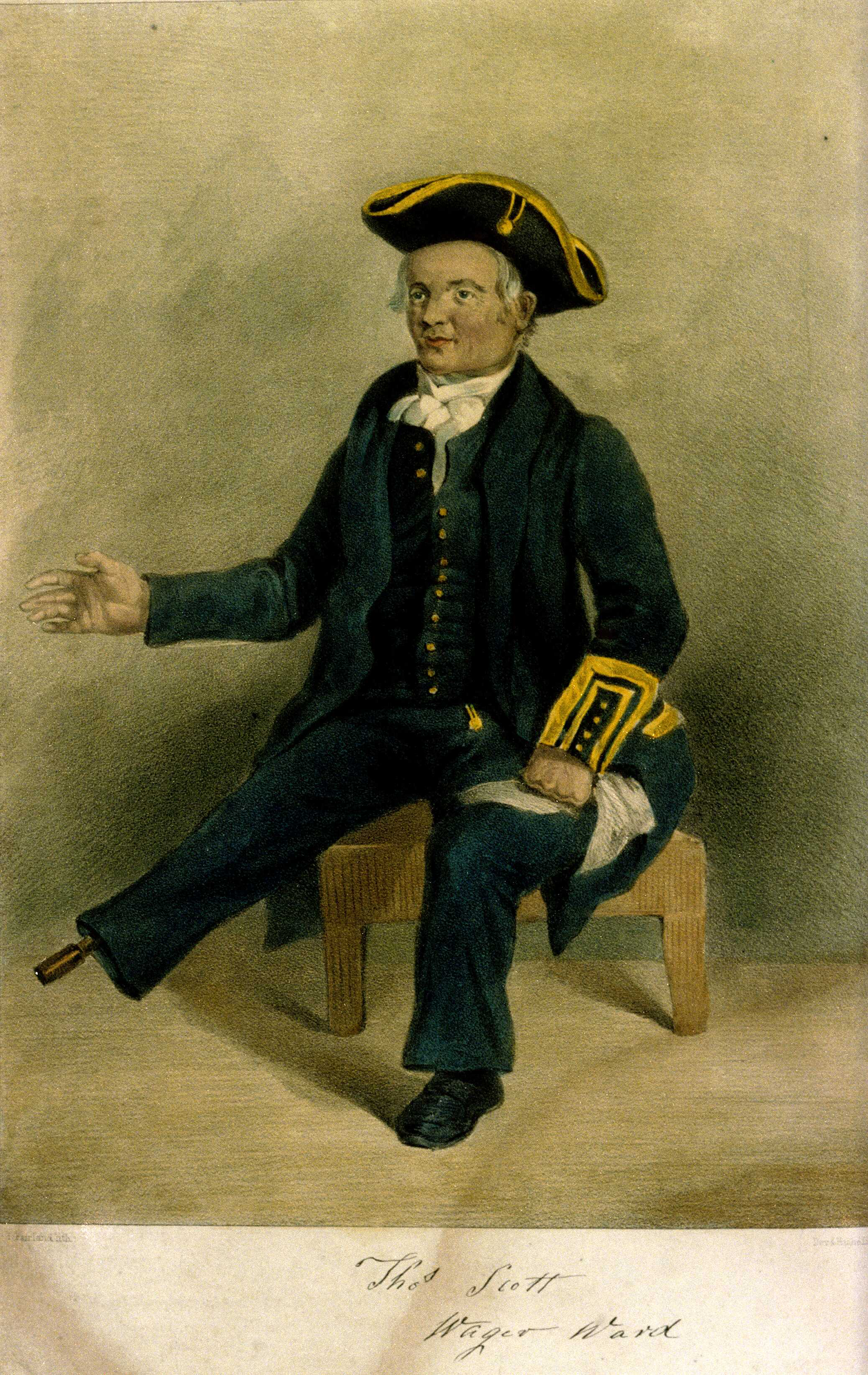
Thomas Scott, one of four survivors of the explosion to reach Sumatra

Resistance anchored in Bangka Strait on the evening of 23 July, with the sloop arriving at 1 a.m. the next day. The two ships settled to wait for the morning when the transfer of the captain could take place, but at around 4 a.m. Resistance suddenly caught fire and exploded. No cause of the incident has been concluded, but some reports suggest that it was caused by a lightning strike that travelled down the foremast and into the magazine. 332 people were killed in the explosion, while thirteen survived. Among the dead were all the ship's officers, three English wives of crewmen, a woman from Amboyna, and fourteen Spanish prisoners. (Note: Pakenham was the only captain of a fifth-rate to be killed by fire or explosion during the French Revolutionary or Napoleonic Wars. Rainier had appointed a relative of his, Commander Alexander Milner, to replace him shortly before the explosion. The loss of the ship terminated Milner's appointment, and it would take him another fourteen years to receive promotion to post captain.)

Resistance settled on the seabed with her starboard hammock netting just above the waterline, which the survivors held on to until the morning. At dawn the sloop, under the control of its native crew, sailed away without offering assistance. The survivors, led by a quartermaster, constructed a raft using Resistance's main yard and its rigging and attempted to sail to Sumatra at 1 p.m.; they continued until 7 p.m. when the raft began to break apart. Four men lashed together a piece of the raft with two spars while the others continued with the main raft. The four successfully reached the north coast of Sumatra at 9 p.m. on 25 July, but the others of their party were not seen again.

The survivors walked along the coast to search for assistance, and at 4 p.m. on 26 July they discovered a fleet of Malay pirates who had five of their proas near the shore. The pirates took the men in because one of the survivors, Thomas Scott, spoke their language and begged for his life. The pirates brought them onboard their boats and the British men served them for a while before it was decided that they would be sold into slavery. By this point Major Taylor, the officer commanding the British garrison at Malacca, had been made aware of the fate of Resistance, and asked the Sultan of Lingga to assist in recovering the survivors. The Sultan quickly succeeded in retrieving the first three men; Alexander M'Carthy (the quartermaster) and John Hutton were given freely to him by the master of the proa they were working in; then Joseph Scott was sold for fifteen rixdollars by the Timor-men who held him. (Note: All three men were at Lingga because the pirates had gone there with some of their ships to sell a sloop they had recently captured.)

Believing the three to be the only survivors, the Sultan had them sent in a proa to Penang. The final survivor, Thomas Scott, had been kept on board the boat controlled by the leader of the pirates, but was brought to Lingga nine days later where he was sold at the market for thirty-five rixdollars. Scott's new owner offered to release him if he could pay him back the price of his purchase, but on the following day the Sultan retrieved him. Scott was sent to Malacca on 5 December, and eventually returned to England in the 28-gun frigate HMS Carysfort, doing so on 5 October 1799. (Note: Thomas Scott survived the initial explosion because he had been sleeping on the larboard side of the quarterdeck when the explosion happened; having awoken just beforehand he was knocked unconscious and thrown into the water, from where he recovered and began to work with the other survivors.)

== Prizes ==
Vessels captured or destroyed for which Resistance's crew received full or partial credit
Date	Ship	Nationality	Type	Fate	Ref.
16 February 1783	Fox	American	Merchant ship	Captured	
2 March 1783	Not recorded	French	20-gun ship	Captured	
2 March 1783	La Coquette	French	24-gun corvette	Captured	
6 March 1783	Not recorded	Danish	Merchant ship	Captured	
8 March 1783	Hope	American	Merchant ship	Captured	
8 March 1783	Not recorded	Not recorded	Merchant ship	Captured	
5 May 1794	Duguay Trouin	French	34-gun frigate	Captured	
October 1794	Revanche	French	18-gun ship	Captured	
17 August 1795	Constantia	Dutch	Merchant ship	Captured	
October 1797	Yonge Frans	Dutch	10-gun sloop	Captured	
October 1797	Juno	Dutch	4-gun sloop	Captured	
October 1797	Yonge Lansier	Dutch	10-gun sloop	Captured	
October 1797	Limbi	Dutch	6-gun ketch	Captured	
October 1797	Waaker	Dutch	10-gun sloop	Captured	
October 1797	Resource	Dutch	6-gun brig	Captured	
October 1797	Ternate	Dutch	4-gun brig	Captured	
25 December 1797	Not recorded	Spanish	Merchant brig	Captured	
