= Heywood Manuscript =

Collection of letters and poems

The Heywood Manuscript is a collection of handwritten copies of letters and poems of the Heywood family, and letters from their relatives and friends, which was completed in 1798, and to which some explanatory passages have been added. Most of the letters and poems are by Hester "Nessy" Heywood and younger brother Peter Heywood, and the transcription and reproduction of their correspondence and poetry may have been instigated by Peter as a lasting monument to his sister Nessy, who had devoted herself to him and his release when he was imprisoned on HMS Hector awaiting his court-martial in connection with the Mutiny on the Bounty, and had died very young.

There are five known versions of the manuscript, which were produced for members of the Heywood family. Two are privately owned, the other three are in libraries:

- Manx National Heritage Library, Heywood Manuscript [Acc No. 9519/1/1-186]
- Newberry Library, Chicago, Nessy Heywood, Correspondence 1790-92 [Case MS E 5 .H 5078]
- State Library of New South Wales, Mary Heywood, Letterbook [Microfilm : CY 2809].

The Manx National Heritage copy consists of a preface page with the name of the owner, E. C. Fleetwood, whose wife Elizabeth was Nessy's niece, and several unbound small books and additional loose leaves which are numbered from 1 to 397, and which include a total of 184 different documents. Some pages are missing, and the last 110 pages are blank. One poem is dated 1786, others have no date. Most of the documents are dated between 1790 and 1793 and deal with Peter’s alleged participation in the Mutiny on the Bounty and the court proceedings against the mutineers. In the early 20th century the manuscript was in the possession of A. R. Allinson, a relation of the Heywoods. In the 1920s it was sold to a private collector in London. Manx National Heritage obtained the Heywood Manuscript as well as letters and poems by Peter Heywood and returned them to the Isle of Man, when Bonhams in London auctioned off letters and manuscripts by members of the Bounty expedition in 1996.

In the library catalogue of the New South Wales State Library there is a note that the manuscript was possibly produced by Nessy's older sister, Mary Heywood. It is assumed that the inscription Mary Heywood on the first page is Mary’s handwriting. A second inscription Aunt to Bessie Fleetwood Castle Lawn Douglas suggests that Mary left the manuscript to her niece Elizabeth Fleetwood, the daughter of Mary's and Nessy's youngest brother Edwin Holwell.
