= HMS Nassau (1785) =

Ship of the line of the Royal Navy

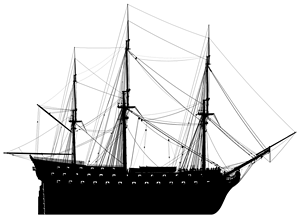
- Silhouette of the ship-of-the-line Nassau

History

Great Britain
- Name: HMS Nassau
- Ordered: 14 November 1782
- Builder: Hilhouse, Bristol
- Laid down: March 1783
- Launched: 28 September 1785
- Fate: Wrecked 14 October 1799

General characteristics
- Class & type: Ardent-class ship of the line
- Tons burthen: 1384 (bm)
- Length: 160 ft (49 m) (gundeck)
- Beam: 44 ft 4 in (13.51 m)
- Depth of hold: 19 ft (5.8 m)
- Propulsion: Sails
- Sail plan: Full-rigged ship
- Armament: 64 guns: Gundeck: 26 × 24-pounder guns; Upper gundeck: 26 × 18-pounder guns; QD: 10 × 4-pounder guns; Fc: 2 × 9-pounder guns

HMS Nassau was a 64-gun third rate ship of the line of the Royal Navy, launched on 28 September 1785 by Hilhouse in Bristol.

One of her first ship's surgeons is thought to be John Sylvester Hay. He died young but he was the father of the actress Harriett Litchfield.

During the Nore Mutiny she was commanded by Captain Edward O'Bryen. She was converted for use as a troopship in 1797.

Nassau was wrecked on the Kicks sandbar off Texel, the Netherlands, on 14 October 1799, there being 205 survivors and about 100 lives lost.
