= HMS Europa (1765) =

Ship of the line of the Royal Navy

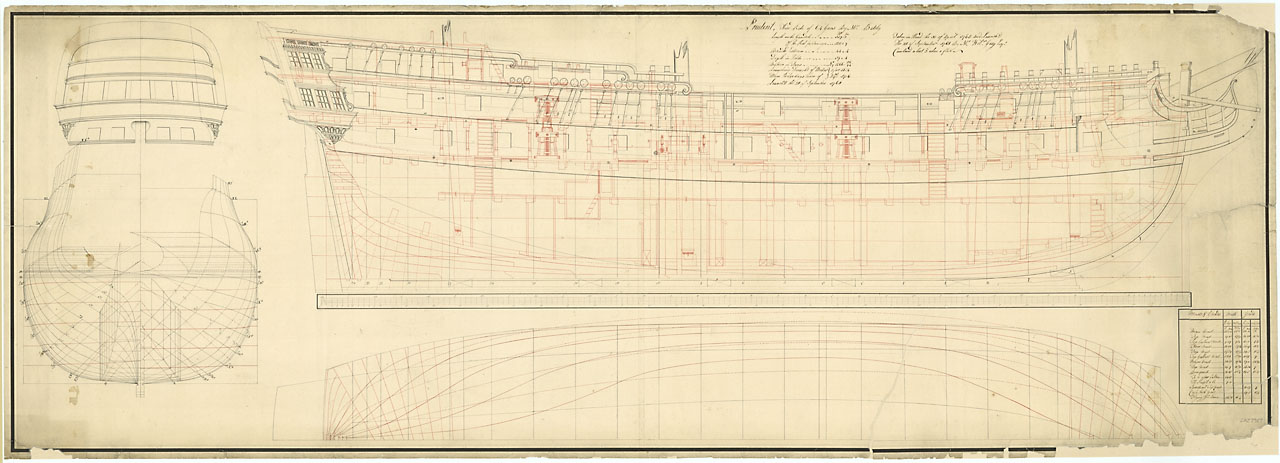
- HMS Europa (1765) image

History

Great Britain
- Name: HMS Europa
- Ordered: 16 December 1761
- Builder: Henry Adams, Lepe
- Laid down: February 1762
- Launched: 21 April 1765
- Completed: By 5 May 1765
- Renamed: HMS Europe on 9 January 1778
- Fate: Broken up in July 1814

General characteristics
- Class & type: Exeter-class ship of the line
- Tons burthen: 1370 (bm)
- Length: 158 ft 9 in (48.39 m) (gundeck)
- Beam: 44 ft (13 m)
- Depth of hold: 19 ft 1 in (5.82 m)
- Propulsion: Sails
- Sail plan: Full-rigged ship
- Armament: Gundeck: 26 × 24-pounder guns; Upper gundeck: 26 × 18-pounder guns; QD: 10 × 4-pounder guns; Fc: 2 × 9-pounder guns

HMS Europa was a 64-gun third rate ship of the line of the Royal Navy, launched on 21 April 1765 at Lepe, Hampshire. She was renamed HMS Europe in 1778, and spent the rest of her career under this name.

Completed too late to see service in the Seven Years' War, most of Europe's service took place during the American War of Independence, supporting fleet movements and serving as the flagship for a number of admirals, including John Montagu, Molyneux Shuldham and Mariot Arbuthnot. During her time in North American waters she took part in the attack on Saint Pierre and Miquelon in 1778, and the battles of Cape Henry on 16 March and the Chesapeake in 1781.

Her last notable commanders as the war drew to a close were John Duckworth and Arthur Phillip, the latter taking her to the East Indies before returning after the conclusion of the war. Europe was then reduced to ordinary in the draw down of the navy following the end of hostilities, and was not reactivated on the outbreak of the French Revolutionary Wars. She only returned to service in 1796, recommissioning as a prison ship based at Plymouth, in which role she served out the remainder of the French Revolutionary Wars, and the Napoleonic Wars, finally being broken up in 1814.

== Construction and commissioning ==
She was ordered from Henry Adams, of Lepe on 16 December 1761, laid down at his yards in February 1762, and launched there on 21 April 1765. By this time the Seven Years' War was over and she was ordered to be fitted for ordinary rather than entering active service immediately, a process completed by 5 May 1765. She had received the name Europa on 18 April 1763, while under construction. The outbreak of the American War of Independence led to a need for more ships, and an Admiralty order was issued on 19 September 1777 for her to be refitted and then prepared for sea. She was taken in hand at Portsmouth Dockyard, which had already been working on a small repair since October 1776, and she was commissioned in September 1777 under her first captain, Timothy Edwards. She was renamed HMS Europe on 9 January 1778, and completed her fitting out in March that year.

== Service ==
Edwards was succeeded by Captain Francis Parry in April 1778, and Europe became the flagship of Vice-Admiral John Montagu, under whom she sailed for Newfoundland in May 1779. She was part of the attack on Saint Pierre and Miquelon on 14 September 1778, and later that month Parry was succeeded by Captain Thomas Davey, serving with Molyneux Shuldham's squadron. In April 1779 she came under the command of Captain William Swiney, by now serving as the flagship of Vice-Admiral Mariot Arbuthnot, and after some time in home waters she sailed again for North America in May 1779.

Captain Smith Child took over command of Europe in August 1780, and she participated in the battles of Cape Henry on 16 March and the Chesapeake on 5 September 1781. During the Battle of the Chesapeake she formed the leading part of the centre division, along with the 74-gun HMS Montagu, and was heavily involved in the fighting. These two ships suffered heavy damage, with Europe in a leaking condition, with her rigging badly cut, and a number of guns dismounted. Nine members of her crew were killed, and a further 18 wounded. The British fleet eventually withdrew from the action. She was then paid off in March 1782, undergoing a refit at Plymouth between May and September that year, during which time she was coppered.

Europe was recommissioned in August 1782 under the command of Captain John Duckworth, with command passing the following year to Captain Arthur Phillip. He sailed to the East Indies in January 1783, returning the following year and paying Europe off in May 1784. She was fitted for ordinary at Plymouth in July 1784, and spent the rest of the years of peace in this condition.

=== French Revolutionary Wars ===
Europa was recommissioned during the French Revolutionary Wars, in July 1796. She was used as a prison ship at Plymouth under Lieutenant John Gardiner, until being paid off again in September 1800. Recommissioned again in September 1801 under Lieutenant Thomas Darracot, she again served as a prison ship until being paid off in March 1802. A warrant of Commission dated 29 April 1802 appointed John Wainwright Esqr. as captain.

=== Napoleonic Wars ===
She was again in service, still as a prison ship, between November 1804 and December 1809, under Lieutenant William Styles, and was briefly commissioned in 1814 under Lieutenant John Mills Mudge. Europe was finally broken up at Plymouth in July 1814.
