= Smith Child (Royal Navy officer) =

Royal Navy Admiral (1730 – 1813)

Admiral Smith Child
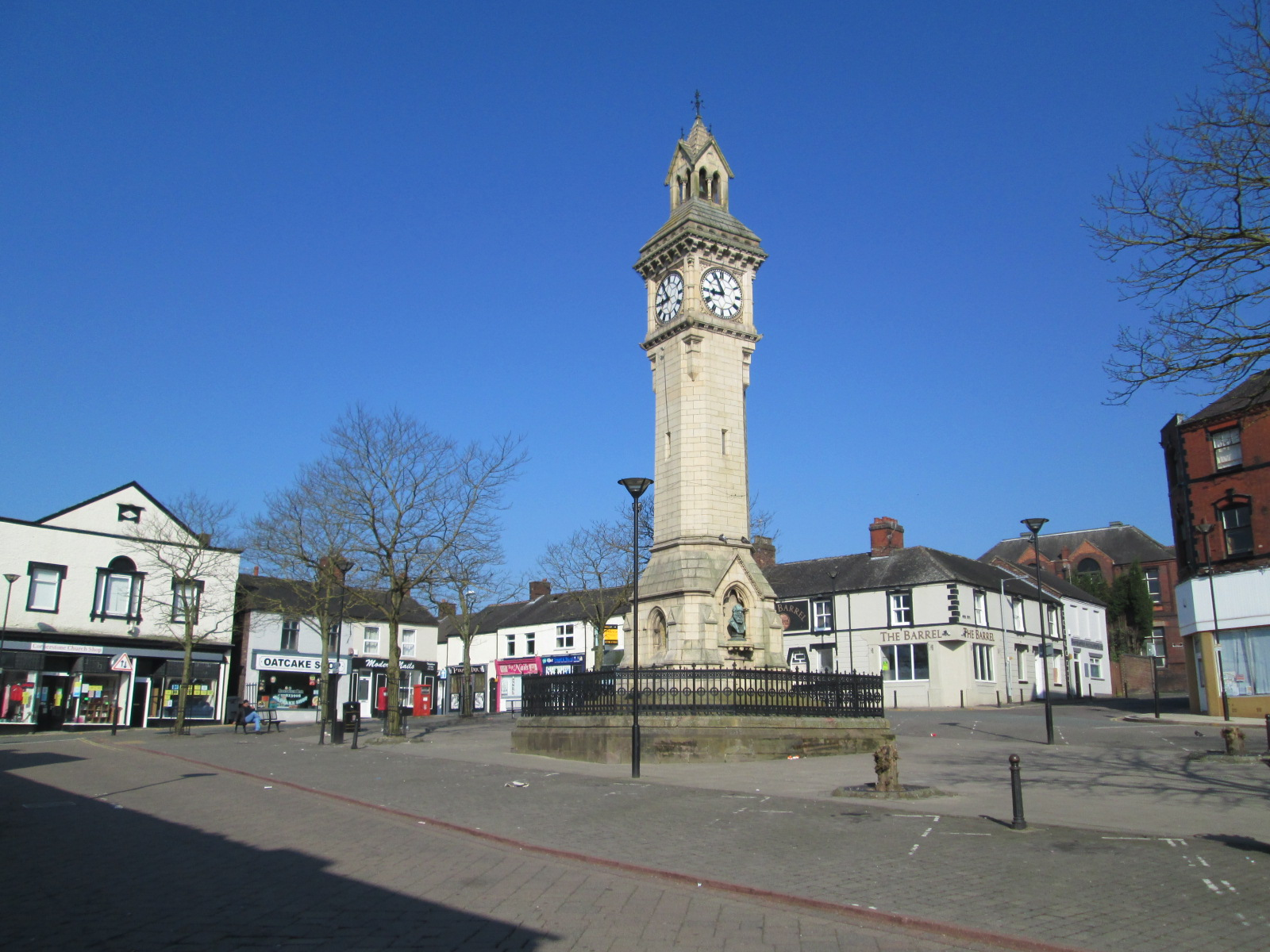
- Clocktower in Tunstall dedicated to Admiral Smith Child.
- Born: 1730
- Died: 1813 (aged 82–83)
- Burial place: St. Margaret's Church, Wolstanton, Staffordshire
- Military career
- Allegiance: Great Britain
- Branch: Royal Navy
- Service years: 1747–1813
- Rank: Admiral
- Commands: HMS Europe; HMS Commerce de Marseille
- Conflicts: Seven Years' War; American Revolutionary War; French Revolutionary Wars

Admiral Smith Child (1730 – 1813) was an officer in the Royal Navy. He served in the Seven Years' War, the American Revolutionary War, and the French Revolutionary Wars, rising to the rank of admiral. He also established a pottery manufactory in Tunstall, Staffordshire.

== Biography ==
Born into a well-to-do family from Audley, Staffordshire, Smith Child entered the Royal Navy in 1747 through a connection between his father (also named Smith Child) and First Lord of the Admiralty George Anson. Serving first aboard HMS Chester, he rose through the ranks, seeing service in the Seven Years' War supporting the Siege of Louisbourg in 1758 and the Siege of Pondicherry in 1760.

In 1763 he established a pottery-manufactory in Tunstall, Staffordshire, and married Margaret Roylance of Newfield the following year, acquiring a significant estate from her family. They had two sons; one was lost at sea, and the other died two years before his father.

By the American War of Independence he had been promoted to captain. He was in command of HMS Europe as part of Admiral Marriot Arbuthnot's fleet in the March 1781 Battle of Cape Henry, in which the British fought off a French fleet attempting to enter Chesapeake Bay, and again later that year in the critical Battle of the Chesapeake in early September, in which the British lost control of the bay, enabling the decisive Franco-American victory at Yorktown.

In November 1795 he was given command of HMS Commerce de Marseille, a French ship that had captured by the Royal Navy in the 1793 Siege of Toulon. The ship, originally a 118-gun three-decker, had been converted to a store and transport ship, and was loaded with 1,000 men and stores for transport to the West Indies. In somewhat poor condition, she was further damaged in a storm not long after sailing, and Child was forced to return to Portsmouth.

Child was promoted to Vice-Admiral of the Blue in February 1799, but saw no further action. He died in 1813, two years after his son John. As a result, he willed his estate to his grandson, Smith Child. He is buried at St Margaret's Church in Wolstanton. In 1893 a clocktower was erected in Tunstall commemorating his civic contributions.
