= Constantia (1782 ship) =

History

Dutch East India Company
- Name: Constantia
- Builder: Delfshaven
- Launched: 1782
- Captured: 15 August 1795

General characteristics
- Tons burthen: 440 Last (load) (880 tons)
- Length: 140 Voet (Foot)

Constantia was launched in 1782 at the Delft Shipyard as an East Indiaman for the Delft Chamber of the Dutch East India Company (VOC). The British Royal Navy captured her in 1795 when the British occupied Malacca.

== Career ==
1st VOC voyage (1784–1785): Captain Adriaan van Katersveld sailed from Goeree on 14 September 1784, bound for Batavia. Consantia arrived at the Cape of Good Hope on 23 December, and left on 16 January 1785. She arrived at Batavia on 21 April.

2nd VOC voyage (1786): Captain Adriaan van Katersveld sailed from Bengal on 22 January 1786 with cargo for the Delft and Rotterdam Chambers of the VOC. Constantia arrived at the Cape on 3 April, and left on 11 May. She arrived at Goeree on 20 July.

3rd VOC voyage (1787): Captain Jan Hendrik van der Linden sailed from Goeree on 16 May 1787, bound for Batavia. Constantia arrived at the Cape on 29 August, and left on 12 October. She arrived at Batavia on 18 December.

4th VOC voyage (1790–1791): Captain Johan Gallo sailed from Batavia on 28 October 11790, bound for Goeree with cargo for the Delft Chamber. Constantia arrived at the Cape on 25 January 1791, and left on 20 February. She arrived at Goeree on 20 May.

5th VOC voyage (1793–1794): Captain Andries Laurens Kanters sailed from Goeree on 8 July 1793, bound for Batavia. Constantia arrived at the Cape on 22 November, and left on 8 December. She arrived at Batavia on 18 February 1794.

== Fate ==
The Dutch government at Malacca arranged with the British government to turn Malacca over to the British rather than the having the Batavian Government, allies of the French, take possession. The British sent an expedition from Bengal that arrived off Malacca on 15 August 1795. HMS Resistance arrived on the 17th, and the operation began that morning.

Constantia had been run into the mud between the fleet and the Fort. Resistance fired a few shots in her direction; Constancia fired two shots in return, and then struck. Lieutenant Thomas Pitt (acting), of Resistance, led the boarding party. (Note: On 24 November 1795, Pitt was summarily discharged and left to find his own way back to England.) Midshipman Nesbit Willoughby commanded a second boat that accompanied Pitt.

The British troops landed, took possession of the Fort, and the Dutch signed Articles of Capitulation.

One European sailor aboard Constantia had been shot dead before she struck. On 21 January 1796, Constantia's captain, commander, and sublieutenant, together with 17 European sailors and 24 Madurese soldiers left Malacca on the privately owned vessel Arnolda, E. Campadonica, master, bound for Java.
