= Battle of Grand Turk =

Battle in the American Revolution

Coordinates: 21°28′N 71°08′W

Capture of The Turks and Caicos Islands
- Part of the American Revolutionary War and the Anglo-French War (1778–1783)
Date	9 March 1783
Location	Turks and Caicos Islands, Caribbean
Result	French victory

Belligerents
France	Great Britain

Commanders and leaders
Marquis de Grasse-Briançon; M. de Coujolles	unknown (defence); Horatio Nelson (relief)

Strength
400	Unknown (defence); 167 (relief); 2 brigs

Casualties and losses
None	9 wounded

The Battle of Grand Turk occurred on 9 March 1783 during the American Revolutionary War. France had seized the Turks and Caicos archipelago, islets of rich salt works, taking the island of Grand Turk in February 1783. The British responded by deploying 28-gun frigate HMS Albemarle with a force of more than 100 men under the command of Captain Horatio Nelson. Although the mission failed, the islands were restored to Britain in the second Treaty of Paris that formally concluded the war six months later.

== French capture ==
On 12 February 1783, a three-ship flotilla, headed by the 28-gun La Coquette under the command of the Marquis de Grasse-Briançon (nephew to Admiral Comte de Grasse), arrived at Grand Turk Island. Disembarking about 400 men drawn from four regiments under the command of M. de Coujolles, the French took control of the island without resistance.

== British recovery attempt ==
On 2 March 1783, the 44-gun HMS Resistance, under the command of Captain James King, while sailing in company with HMS Duguay Trouin, discovered two of the French ships anchored in Turks Island passage. On being spotted the two ships cut their cables and stood to the southwest, upon which Resistance promptly gave chase. The rearmost ship, carrying 20 guns, sprang her main topmast, and surrendered after Resistance came up and fired a broadside. Resistance then gave chase to the other, carrying 28 guns, and, after enduring fire from their stern chasers, came alongside, whereupon the Frenchman promptly surrendered. A few days later, Resistance fell in with a small squadron under Captain Horatio Nelson, consisting of HMS Albemarle, HMS Tartar, HMS Drake and the armed ship Barrington. Primary accounts differ on what exactly happened next.

Schomberg's account

King decided, on the basis of the information he had gathered from the taking of La Coquette, to recover Turk's Island. The British landed some 350 seamen and marines under the command of Drake's Captain Charles Dixon, while the two brigs positioned themselves to cover the landing and fire on the town if necessary. However, two shore batteries, one of four 24-pounder guns and one of five 6-pounder guns, that the British had not expected opened fire on the brigs. Their fire wounded seven men on Drake and two on Barrington and forced the two brigs to withdraw. At the same time, Dixon ran into a well-entrenched French force that outnumbered his landing party. He was able to extricate his force without casualties. King contemplated a second attack with the frigates, but the winds were not favorable and ultimately the British squadron withdrew.

Nelson's account

Nelson, in his letter of 9 March 1783, reported that he was in command of the squadron and the operation. Shortly after the squadron arrived at Turk's Island, Tartar left without explanation. Nelson states that he sent Dixon under a flag of truce to ask the French commander to surrender; the demand was refused. The British then landed 167 troops, under Dixon. Unexpectedly, a shore battery of three guns opened fire on the brigs. Drake's master was wounded, as were some seven men aboard the General Barrington. Dixon reported that seamen were manning the French guns and that the French troops had several field pieces. Nelson then decided to withdraw.

The Turks and Caicos Islands were returned to British control under the terms of Treaty of Paris, which was formally ratified later in 1783.
