= Exeter-class ship of the line =

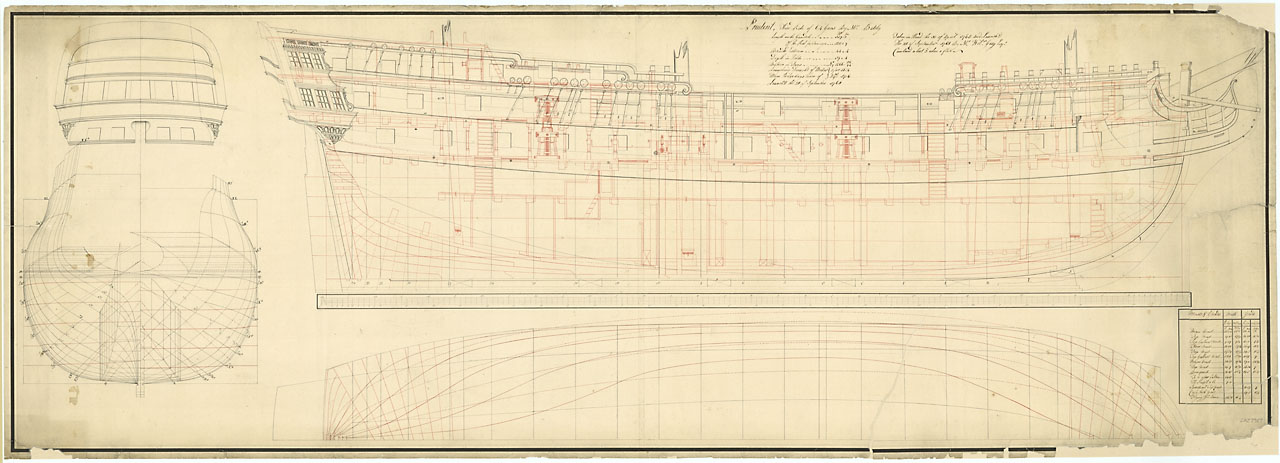

Class overview
- Name: Exeter
- Operators: Royal Navy
- Preceded by: St Albans class
- Succeeded by: Ardent class
- In service: 26 July 1763 – 1816
- Completed: 4
- Lost: 1

General characteristics
- Type: Ship of the line
- Length: 158 ft 9 in (48.39 m) (gundeck); 129 ft 9 in (39.55 m) (keel)
- Beam: 44 ft (13 m)
- Propulsion: Sails
- Armament: 64 guns: Gundeck: 26 × 24-pounders; Upper gundeck: 26 × 18-pounders; Quarterdeck: 10 × 4-pounders; Forecastle: 2 × 9-pounders
- Notes: Ships in class include: Exeter, Europa, Trident, Prudent

The Exeter-class ships of the line were a class of four 64-gun third rates, designed for the Royal Navy by William Bateley.

== Design ==
The draught for Exeter was based upon the Richmond-class frigates of 1756.

== Ships ==
- HMS Exeter

Builder: Henniker, Chatham
Ordered: 13 January 1760
Launched: 26 July 1764
Fate: Burned, 1785

- HMS Europa

Builder: Adams, Lepe, Hampshire
Ordered: 16 December 1761
Launched: 21 April 1765
Fate: Broken up, 1814

- HMS Trident

Builder: Plymouth Dockyard
Ordered: 4 December 1762
Launched: 20 April 1768
Fate: Sold out of the service, 1816

- HMS Prudent

Builder: Woolwich Dockyard
Ordered: 7 January 1762
Launched: 28 September 1768
Fate: Sold out of the service, 1814
