= Ardent-class ship of the line =

1764 class of British third-rate ships of the line

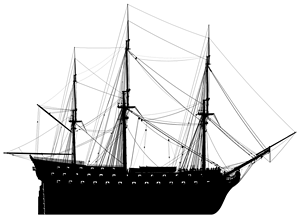
- A silhouette of an Ardent-class ship of the line

Class overview
- Name: Ardent
- Operators: Royal Navy; French Navy
- Preceded by: Exeter class
- Succeeded by: Intrepid class
- In service: 13 August 1764 – 1816
- Completed: 7
- Lost: 2

General characteristics
- Type: Ship of the line
- Length: 160 ft (49 m) (gundeck); 131 ft 8 in (40.13 m) (keel)
- Beam: 44 ft 4 in (13.51 m)
- Propulsion: Sails
- Armament: 64 guns: Gundeck: 26 × 24-pounders; Upper gundeck: 26 × 18-pounders; Quarterdeck: 10 × 4-pounders; Forecastle: 2 × 9-pounders
- Notes: Ships in class include: Ardent, Raisonnable, Agamemnon, Belliqueux, Stately, Indefatigable, Nassau

The Ardent-class ships of the line were a class of seven 64-gun third rates, designed for the Royal Navy by Sir Thomas Slade.

== Design ==
Slade based the design of the Ardent class on the captured French ship Fougueux.

== Ships ==
- HMS Ardent

Builder: Blades, Hull
Ordered: 16 December 1761
Launched: 13 August 1764
Fate: Sold out of the service, 1784

- HMS Raisonnable

Builder: Chatham Dockyard
Ordered: 11 January 1763
Launched: 10 December 1768
Fate: Broken up, 1815

- HMS Agamemnon

Builder: Adams, Bucklers Hard
Ordered: 8 April 1777
Launched: 10 April 1781
Fate: Wrecked, 1809

- HMS Belliqueux

Builder: Perry, Blackwall Yard
Ordered: 19 February 1778
Launched: 5 June 1780
Fate: Broken up, 1816

- HMS Stately

Builder: Raymond, Northam
Ordered: 10 December 1778
Launched: 27 December 1784
Fate: Broken up, 1814

- HMS Indefatigable

Builder: Adams, Bucklers Hard
Ordered: 3 August 1780
Launched: July 1784
Fate: Broken up, 1816

- HMS Nassau

Builder: Hilhouse, Bristol
Ordered: 14 November 1782
Launched: 28 September 1785
Fate: Wrecked, 1799
