= Catisfield =

Area of Fareham, Hampshire, England

Coordinates: 50.852°N 1.222°W

Catisfield is an area of Fareham, Hampshire, England. Originally a small village in its own right, it has now merged with the western edge of the town.

== Hamlet ==
Originally a hamlet, Catisfield is first mentioned in the Pipe Roll of the Bishopric of Winchester in 1210 and mentioned in 1279 in the tithing of North Fareham, when Catisfield, Dean, Pokesole, Cams and Bedenham had been added to the Hundred of Fareham.

Catisfield is located north of Titchfield village, on the eastern edge of the Meon Valley. There is little documented history relating to the area; available records describe it as a small hamlet situated on the crest of Titchfield Hill at a road junction overlooking the valley.

Before the 19th century, Catisfield lay at the meeting point of several historic routes leading to Botley, Stubbington, Titchfield, Southampton, Fareham, and Portsmouth. It is believed that Samuel Pepys may have passed through the area during his travels, as did Margaret of Anjou in 1445 on her way from Southwick to Titchfield Abbey for the reconfirmation of her marriage to Henry VI in France.

A website does contain a considerable collection of information and photographs

The hamlet does still feature the original, but no longer used, post office and some preserved Georgian and Victorian buildings.

It is also very close to Titchfield Abbey and the River Meon, which lie just down Fishers Hill.

== Politics ==
Catisfield is part of the Hamble Valley parliamentary constituency for elections to the House of Commons. It is held by the Conservative Member of Parliament (MP) Paul Holmes.
