= HMS Amboyna =

British naval brig (1796–1802)

History

Batavian Republic
- Name: Harlingen (Haarlingen, Haalem, or Haerlem)
- Captured: 23 January 1796

Great Britain
- Name: HMS Amboyna
- Acquired: 23 January 1796 by capture
- Commissioned: 9 March 1796
- Fate: Broken up April 1802

General characteristics
- Type: brig
- Propulsion: Sails
- Armament: Dutch service: 14 guns; British service: 10 guns

HMS Amboyna was the Dutch brig Harlingen, which the British captured in the East Indies in 1796. They renamed her Amboyna after their recent capture of Ambon Island. She then served briefly in the Royal Navy before she was broken up in 1802.

== Capture ==
In early 1796 Commodore Peter Rainier sailed a squadron consisting of Suffolk (his flagship), Centurion, Resistance, Orpheus, Swift, one or two armed vessels belonging to the East India Company, and three transports with troops, towards the Dutch possessions in the East Indies. On their way as they were passing through the Straits of Banca, on 22 January they sighted a strange sail. Lieutenant William Hugh Dobbie, fifth lieutenant of Suffolk took her launch to investigate. When it became obvious that the vessel was a becalmed Dutch naval brig, Suffolk's boats joined him. Towards early evening, a breeze came up, which enabled the brig to make sail. Dobbie and the boats gave chase, firing their swivel guns as their quarry fired at them. Eventually, Orpheus came up and at 2am captured the brig at 2am. She was the Harlingen, of 14 guns and 45 men. Rainier put Dobbie in command of Harlingen.

On 16 February 1796 the squadron arrived off Amboyna, Molucca islands and landed troops who were able to take possession without facing any resistance. Then on 7 March, the squadron arrived off Great-Banda, or Banda-Neira in the Banda Islands and again landed troops, this time taking possession after facing only a little resistance. Orpheus and Harlingen covered the landing, their fire silencing a battery.

The Admiral found in the Treasury at Amboyna 81,112 Rixdollars, and in store 515,940 pounds (weight) of cloves; in the Treasury at Banda-Neira the British found 66,675 Rix dollars, 84,777 pounds of nutmeg, 19,587 pounds of mace, and merchandise and other stores. Estimates suggest that each of the captains in Rainier's squadron received £15,000 in prize money.

== Service ==
The day after Banda capitulated, i.e., on 9 March, Rainier had Harlingen purchased into the Navy and commissioned her as Amboyna, with Dobbie as her captain. Rainier intended to have Amboyna sail back to England with Captain Robert Lambert (of Suffolk) and the dispatches announcing the victory. At the last minute news arrived of an uprising by the local populace, who were Moslem, against the Dutch on Ambon. Rainier sent Orpheus to Madras with the dispatches instead, and Amboyna to Ambon to support the Dutch. Amboyna spent April and May on this mission before the Anglo-Dutch forces were able to suppress the insurgency.

Rainier then had Amboyna escort a ship with a cargo of spices to China. Dobbie's mission was also to procure supplies for the British squadron in the Moluccas. When Amboyna arrived at Macao, it was discovered that she would have to be put on her side to repair damage from a grounding in the Sulu Sea. While Dobbie went up to Whampoa, he left Amboyna in the Typa (inner harbour) under the supervision of Lieutenant Arthur Farquhar, a friend who had traveled on her as a supernumerary. While she was being turned on her side, a gang of "ladrones" (thieves) attempted to capture and loot her; fortunately Farquhar was able to drive them off.

Dobbie returned to Suffolk in December 1797. Lieutenant Joseph Pulham then replaced him as captain of Amboyna. Rainier appointed Lieutenant Peter Heywood of Suffolk on 17 May 1799 to take command of Amboyna, which was then at Mangalore, to sail her to Madras. There he was to take the dispatches reporting the Battle of Seringapatam, which were expected momentarily. However, when Heywood reached Madras he discovered that the dispatches had already left for England on a merchant vessel hired for the purpose. Heywood then immediately returned to the Suffolk.

On 14 June 1799, Rainier appointed Lieutenant William Josiah Willougby to command Amboyna. Willoughby had been a midshipman on Suffolk at the capture of Ambon and Banda, and just emerged from a year under arrest. He had demanded a court-martial after Captain William Clark of Victorious, on which he was then serving, had arrested him for "disrespectful behaviour" and then withdrawn the charge. The court martial found Willougby guilty but had sentenced him to time served and ordered him reinstated to his rank; the court martial also exonerated Clark. Willoughby declined the appointment due to ill-health brought on by his confinement and returned to England.

In late 1799 Amboyna was at Mokha following Commodore John Blankett's expedition to the Red Sea to block the French from using it to threaten India. In February 1800 Blankett returned to the Red Sea with a squadron that included Amboyna.

Lieutenant Robert Sheldrake took command of Amboyna in April 1800. In September 1800 Vice-Admiral Peter Rainier received the Admiralty's permission to mount an expedition against Java, in particular to blockade Batavia. On 28 September, on the eve of his departure, he allocated his naval forces. Amboyna was at Bombay with the rest of Rear-Admiral Blankett's squadron.

In 1801, Lieutenant John Cawley replaced Sheldrake.

== Fate ==
Amboyna was sold in 1802 for breaking up.

Note: An Amboyna, of 350 tons (bm), T.Miller, master, appeared in the East-India register and directory (1803; p. 213), with registry at Madras.
