= HMS Trident (1768) =

Ship of the line of the Royal Navy

History

Great Britain
- Name: HMS Trident
- Ordered: 4 December 1762
- Builder: Portsmouth Dockyard
- Launched: 20 April 1768
- Fate: Sold out of the service, 1816

General characteristics
- Class & type: Exeter-class ship of the line
- Tons burthen: 136686/94 (bm)
- Length: 158 ft 9 in (48.39 m) (gundeck)
- Beam: 44 ft (13 m)
- Depth of hold: 19 ft 1 in (5.82 m)
- Propulsion: Sails
- Sail plan: Full-rigged ship
- Armament: Gundeck: 26 × 24-pounder guns; Upper gundeck: 26 × 18-pounder guns; QD: 10 × 4-pounder guns; Fc: 2 × 9-pounder guns

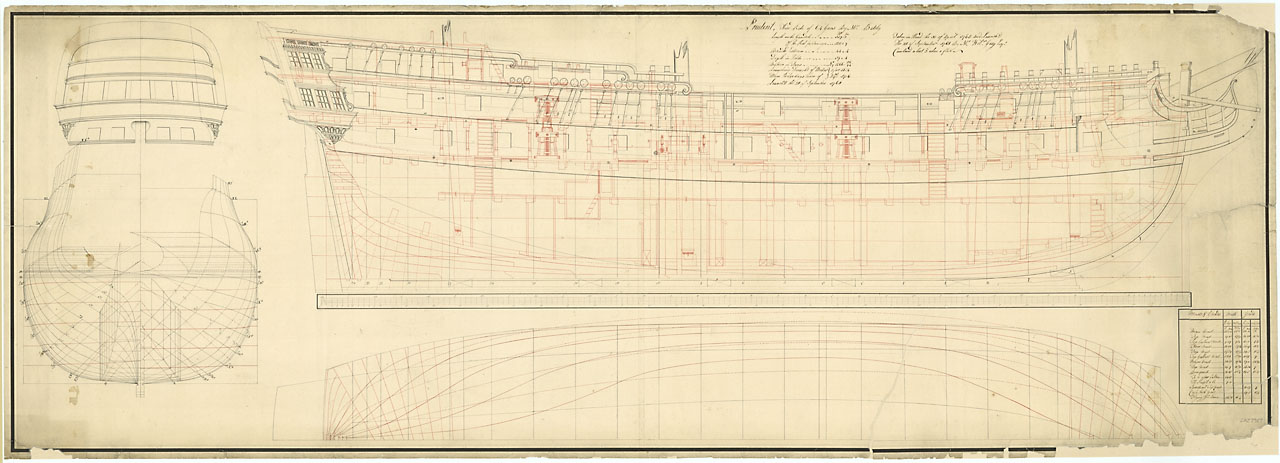
Drawing of the Trident.

HMS Trident was a 64-gun third rate ship of the line of the Royal Navy, launched on 20 April 1768 at Portsmouth. On 30 January 1772 in Gibraltar harbour during a severe winter storm the Danish ship-of-the-line Prinsesse Wilhelmine Caroline dragged its anchor, colliding with the bow of HMS Trident before running aground.

From April until June 1778 she was under the command of John Inglis.

For some of the period between 1793 and 1796, she was under the command of Captain Theophilus Jones.

Trident was sold out of the navy in 1816.

== Citations ==
- (in Danish)T. A. Topsøe-Jensen og Emil Marquard (1935) “Officerer i den dansk-norske Søetat 1660-1814 og den danske Søetat 1814-1932“. Two volumes. Download Volume 1 and Volume 2.
