= HMS Prudent =

British ship of the line 1768–1814

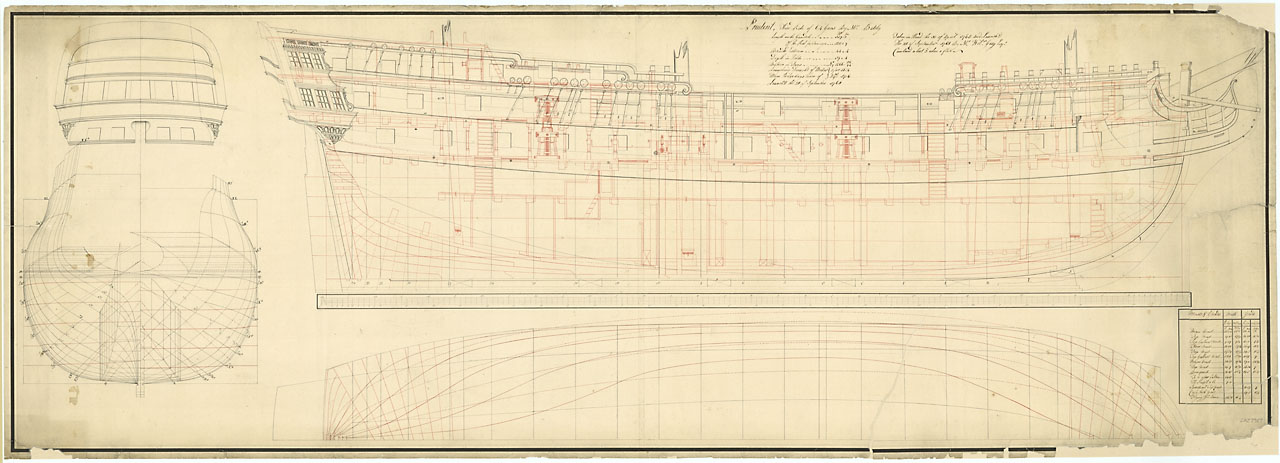

History

Great Britain
- Name: HMS Prudent
- Ordered: 7 January 1762
- Builder: Woolwich Dockyard
- Launched: 28 September 1768
- Honours and awards: Participated in: Battle of St. Kitts
- Fate: Sold out of the service, 1814

General characteristics
- Class & type: Exeter-class ship of the line
- Tons burthen: 1367 (bm)
- Length: 158 ft 9 in (48.4 m) (gundeck)
- Beam: 44 ft (13.4 m)
- Depth of hold: 19 ft 1 in (5.8 m)
- Propulsion: Sails
- Sail plan: Full-rigged ship
- Armament: Gundeck: 26 × 24-pounder guns; Upper gundeck: 26 × 18-pounder guns; QD: 10 × 4-pounder guns; Fc: 2 × 9-pounder guns

HMS Prudent was a 64-gun third rate ship of the line of the Royal Navy, launched on 28 September 1768 at Woolwich.

She is listed as being on harbour service in 1779, though she was back in regular service later in the American Revolutionary War as in 1782 she participated in the Battle of St. Kitts.

Prudent was at Plymouth on 20 January 1795 and so shared in the proceeds of the detention of the Dutch naval vessels, East Indiamen, and other merchant vessels that were in port on the outbreak of war between Britain and the Netherlands.

Prudent was sold out of the service in 1814.
