= André-Marie de Gouzillon de Bélizal =

French Navy officer

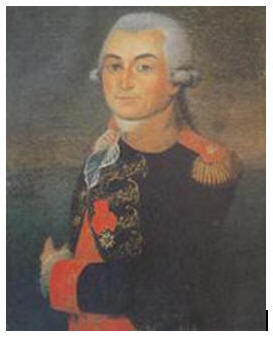
- Born: 12 May 1741; Brest, France
- Died: 14 July 1795 (aged 54) Quibéron, France
- Branch: French Navy
- Rank: Chef de Division
- Conflicts: Seven Years' War; American Revolutionary War; Battle of Quibéron †

André-Marie de Gouzillon de Bélizal (12 May 1741 — 14 July 1795) was a French Navy officer who served in the Seven Years' War and the American Revolutionary War.

== Biography ==
Bélizal was born to an aristocratic family. He was the grandson of La Jaille, and brother to Charles de Kermorvant de Gouzillon, and to Jean-Michel-Guillaume de Gouzillon, who both also served in the Navy. Bélizal joined the Navy as a Garde-Marine on 12 December 1755. He was promoted to Lieutenant on 24 March 1772.

Bélizal took part in the Seven Years' War, where he was wounded twice.

In 1777, Bélizal commanded the 10-gun Curieuse in the Squadron of Brest, under Du Chaffault.

In June 1778, Bélizal captained the 32-gun frigate Licorne, part of a division under La Clocheterie, and also comprising the frigate Belle Poule, the corvette Hirondelle and the lugger Coureur. The division threatened by a British squadron, the division separated. While Belle Poule escaped after fighting the action of 17 June 1778, Licorne found herself surrounded by three ships of the line, and struck her colours after Bélizal fired both his broadsides in a token gesture of defence. Bélizal was taken prisoner to Alverstoke. Bélizal was imprisoned for 19 months, during which he refused to consider himself a prisoner of war, as war had not been declared when the British had captured his ship.

Bélizal was promoted to Captain on 9 May 1781. He was given command of the frigate Vénus, capturing the British privateer Lord Amherst on 16 June. (Note: Gardiner provides the name of Lord Amherst, but on the other hand he seems to conflate the three Gouzillon brothers into one person.) Vénus was wrecked near Glénan Islands on 5 August 1781.

From 10 June 1782, he served on the 110-gun Bretagne, and from 1786 he captained the 32-gun frigate Cérès. On 2 November 1786, he was promoted to Chef de Division and given command of the 2nd Division of the 2nd Squadron of the Navy. From August 1790 to 1791, he captained the 74-gun Jupiter. On 7 January 1791, Bélizal was given command of Brest harbour.

At the French Revolution he became an émigré, fleeing France on 10 January 1792. He went first to England, then joined the Armée des Princes, went to Brussels, returned to England, and eventually took part in the Battle of Quibéron in 1795, where he was killed.

== Legacy ==
Bélizal's Journal et Letres d'un émigré were published in 1902 in the Revue de Bretagne by his descendant.
