= William Peere Williams-Freeman =

Royal Navy officer (1742–1832)

Admiral of the Fleet William Peere Williams-Freeman
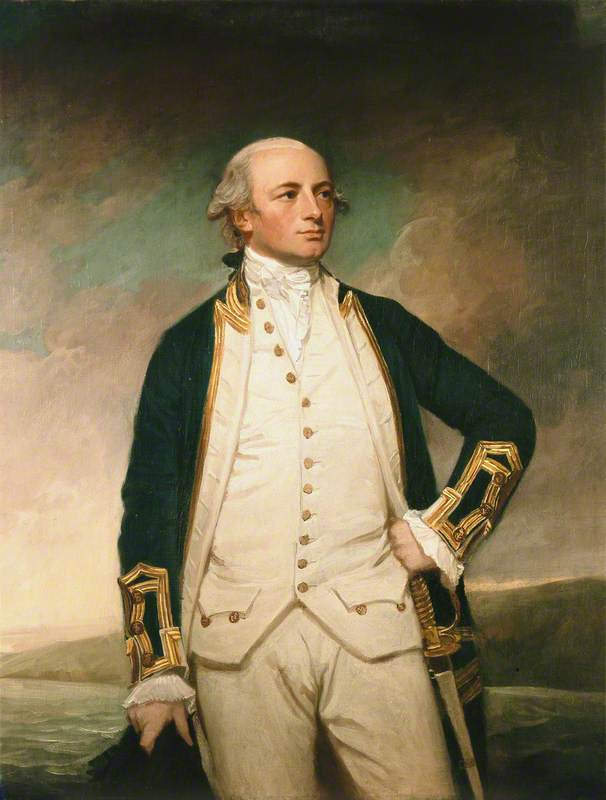
- Portrait by George Romney, c. 1782
- Born: 6 January 1742; Peterborough, England
- Died: 11 February 1832 (aged 90); Hoddesdon, Hertfordshire
- Burial place: Broxbourne, Hertfordshire
- Relatives: William Peere Williams (grandfather); Robert Clavering (grandfather)
- Military career
- Allegiance: Great Britain; United Kingdom
- Branch: Royal Navy
- Service years: 1759–1832
- Rank: Admiral of the Fleet
- Commands: HMS Thunder; HMS Renown; HMS Active; HMS Venus; HMS Brune; HMS Flora
- Conflicts: Seven Years' War; Battle of Quiberon Bay; American Revolutionary War; Battle of Rhode Island; Second Relief of Gibraltar

Admiral of the Fleet William Peere Williams-Freeman (born William Peere Williams; 6 January 1742 – 11 February 1832) was a Royal Navy officer. He saw action aboard as a junior officer at the Battle of Quiberon Bay during the Seven Years' War. He also took part, as captain of the fifth-rate HMS Venus, in the Battle of Rhode Island and then, as captain of the fifth-rate HMS Flora, in the second relief of Gibraltar during the American War of Independence. Many years after his retirement from the Navy, Williams-Freeman became Admiral of the Fleet for a brief period before his death at the age of 90.

== Family and early life ==
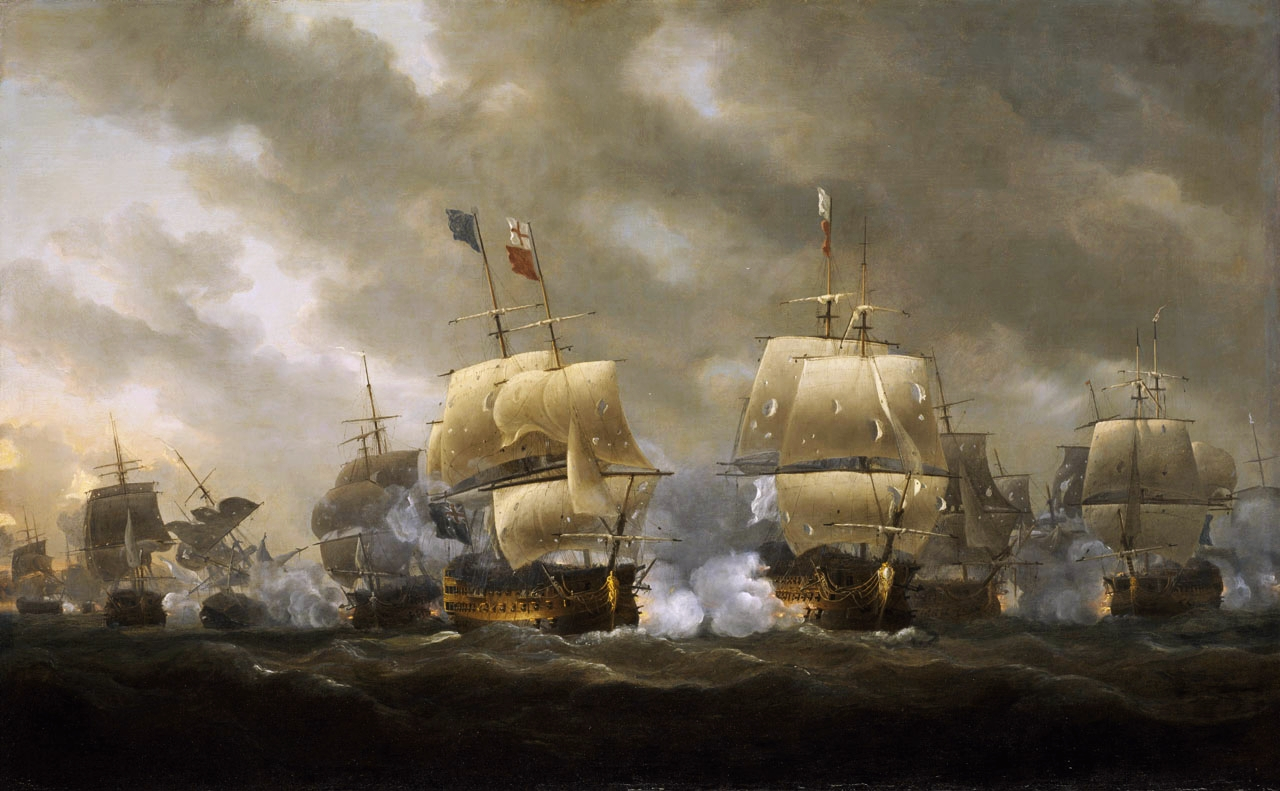
The Battle of Quiberon Bay, at which Williams was present as a junior officer

Williams was born in Peterborough on 6 January 1742, the son of Frederick Williams, prebendary of Peterborough, and his wife Mary Williams (née Clavering). His paternal grandfather was William Peere Williams, while his maternal grandfather was Robert Clavering, bishop of Peterborough, and his maternal grandmother was Mary Freeman, sister of John Cook Freeman of Fawley Court, Buckinghamshire. William Williams was educated at Eton College, and was entered on the books of the 100-gun first-rate HMS Royal Sovereign, the guardship at Spithead, in June 1757. He appears to have first gone to sea in August 1759 aboard the 74-gun ship of the line HMS Magnanime under Lord Howe. Williams saw action aboard her at the Battle of Quiberon Bay on 20 November 1759 during the Seven Years' War.

== First commands ==
In September 1762 Williams followed Howe to the 80-gun third-rate HMS Princess Amelia, and in August 1763 joined the 50-gun HMS Romney with Lord Colville on the Halifax station. On 18 September 1764 he was promoted to be lieutenant of the fifth-rate HMS Rainbow on the Virginia station, and remained in her till she paid off in October 1766. On 26 May 1768 he was promoted to master and commander of the bomb vessel HMS Thunder. He became a post-captain on 10 January 1771 and was appointed to command the 30-gun fifth-rate HMS Renown (1747). He moved to the 28-gun sixth-rate HMS Active on 21 March. He married shortly after this, on 20 June, after which he took Active to the West Indies. There his health gave way and in July 1773 he used his interest to get the ship sent to Newfoundland. His health, however, did not improve, and on 11 October the station's commander, Rear-Admiral John Montagu gave him command of the 20-gun post ship HMS Lively, which he brought home and paid off in February 1774.

== American Revolutionary War ==
=== America and the Atlantic ===
In March 1777 Williams commissioned the fifth-rate HMS Venus, in which he joined Lord Howe on the North America station, and was with the fleet off Rhode Island during their encounter with the French under the Comte d'Estaing on 10 August 1778. He may have again suffered a bout of ill-health, for on 8 September he exchanged ships with Captain James Ferguson and took Ferguson's 32-gun frigate HMS Brune back to England to be paid off.

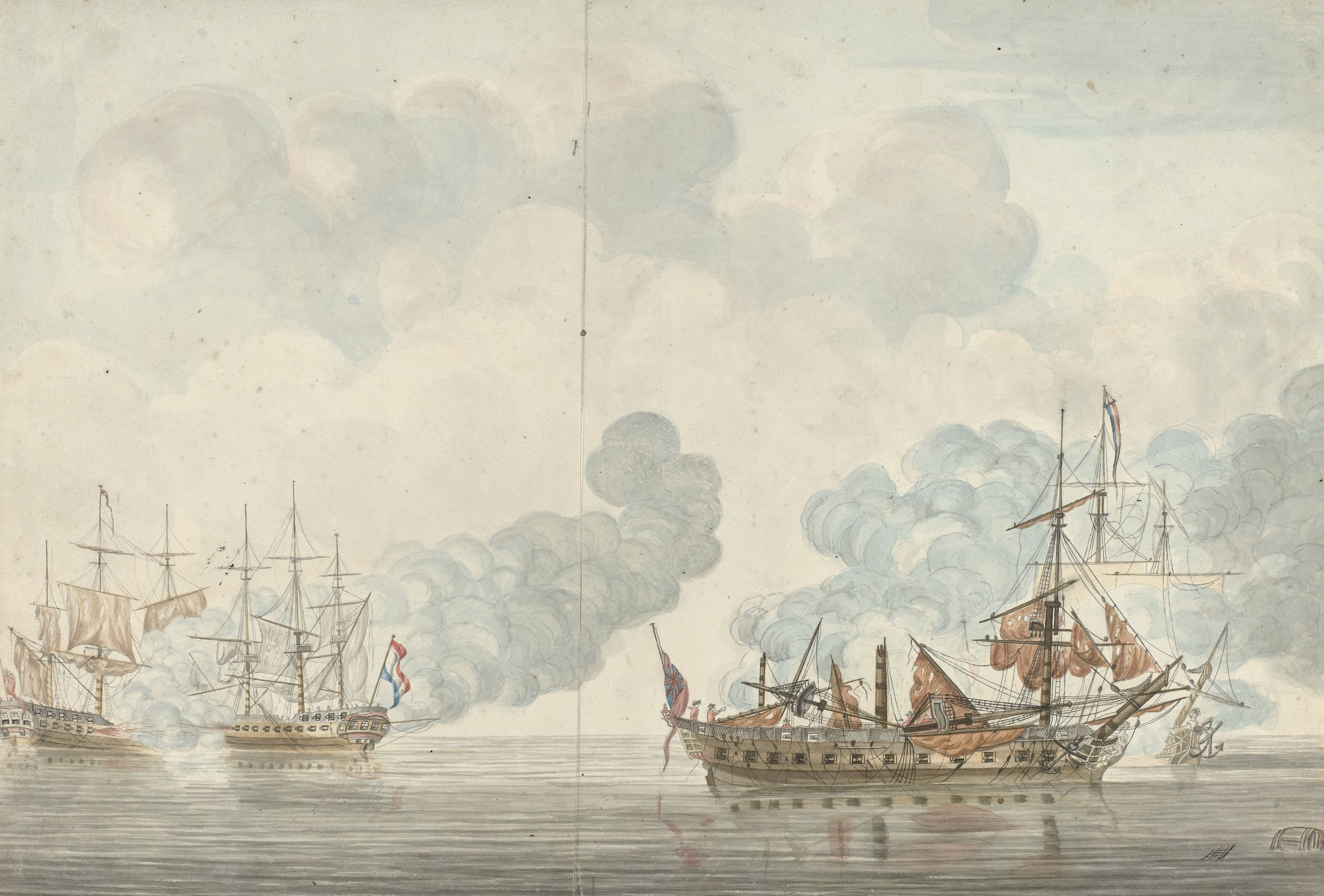
The action of 30 May 1781 at which HMS Flora, under Williams, captured Castor

In April 1780 Williams commissioned HMS Flora, a new and large 36-gun fifth-rate, carrying 18-pounders on her main-deck, and an experimental addition of six 18-pounder carronades to her establishment. She fell in with the French 32-gun frigate Nymphe under Captain du Rumain off Ushant on 10 August 1780. In the ensuing action the better-armed Flora overpowered the larger French ship. The Nymphe lost sixty-three men killed and seventy-three wounded; the Flora had nine killed and twenty-seven wounded. After repulsing a French attempt to board, the British captured her. Naval historian John Knox Laughton asserted that, "Such a decisive result ought to have given Williams full confidence in his novel armament, but it does not seem to have done so".

=== Mediterranean ===
In March 1781 the Flora was with the fleet under Vice-Admiral George Darby at the second relief of Gibraltar, and was afterwards sent on to Menorca, in company with the Captain Thomas Pakenham's 28-gun frigate HMS Crescent, in charge of some victuallers. As they were returning through the Straits off Ceuta on 30 May they met two Dutch frigates of 36 guns, the Castor and the Briel. After a 2¼-hour battle (known as the Battle of Cape St Mary) the Flora captured the Castor (under Pieter Melvill van Carnbee), but the Briel had meantime compelled the Crescent to strike her flag; the Flora hastened to her consort's assistance, and the Briel made her escape. Afterwards, on 19 June, as the two frigates and their prize were broad off Cape Finisterre they fell in with two French 32-gun frigates, Friponne and Gloire. The Crescent and Castor had been dismasted in the former engagement and were jury rigged with only 300 unwounded men out of a full complement of 700 over the three ships. The Castor had only a prize crew on board, who were unable to leave the pumps. Williams made the signal to separate, and left the Crescent and Castor easy prizes to the two Frenchmen. His conduct was not blamed and was not even called in question; but Laughton opines that "when we consider that the Flora's broadside was nearly as heavy as those of the Friponne and Gloire together, it is impossible to avoid thinking that Williams did not understand the novel conditions in his favour".

== Later life ==
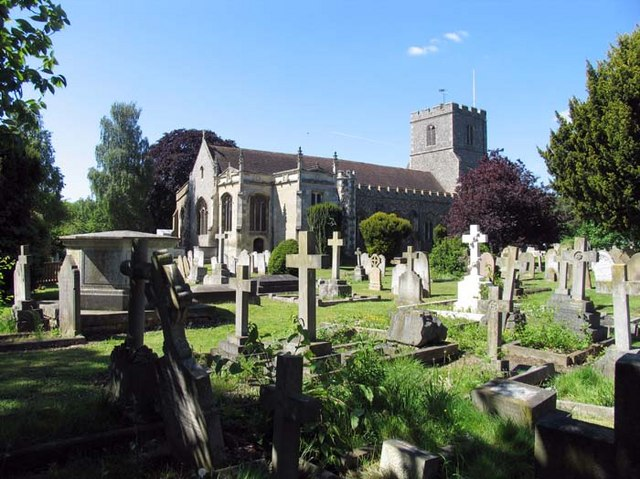
St Augustine's Church, Broxbourne, where Williams was buried

In April 1782 Williams went on half-pay, and had no further service. In 1784 he inherited the family estate, Yew House at Hoddesdon, from Sir Booth Williams, a cousin. He retired to his estates at Remenham Manor near Henley-on-Thames and at Hoddesdon and in November 1821 he took the additional name of Freeman, as a condition of his inheriting the Fawley Court estate from Strickland Freeman, another relative. He rose through the ranks by his seniority, becoming rear-admiral on 12 April 1794, vice-admiral on 1 June 1795 and full admiral on 14 February 1799. On 28 June 1830, three days after the accession of William IV, he was promoted to the rank of Admiral of the Fleet, the king sending him, as a special compliment, a baton which had been presented to himself by George IV. He died at his home at Hoddesdon, Hertfordshire, on 11 February 1832. He was buried in the family vault at St Augustine's Church in Broxbourne.

== Family and issue ==
Williams married Henrietta Willis on 20 June 1771. She died at Hoddesdon in 1819, having borne him two sons, one of them also named William Peere Williams-Freeman. Both predeceased their father, with William junior dying in 1830 and leaving issue. After Admiral Williams's death his grandson applied to know the king's pleasure as to the return of the baton. The king desired that it should be retained by the family as "a memorial of the late admiral's long services and the high professional rank he had attained, and in proof of the estimation in which his character was held by his sovereign and brother officers".

== Sources ==
- Cock, Randolph (2004). "Freeman, William Peere Williams- [formerly William Peere Williams] (1742–1832)". Oxford Dictionary of National Biography. Oxford Dictionary of National Biography (online ed.). Oxford University Press. doi:10.1093/ref:odnb/29565. (Subscription, Wikipedia Library access or UK public library membership required.)
- Heathcote, Tony (2002). The British Admirals of the Fleet 1734 – 1995. Pen & Sword. ISBN 0-85052-835-6.
- Tymms, Samuel (1832). The family topographer: being a compendious account of the antient and present state of the counties of England, Volume 1. J. B. Nichols & Son.
- This article incorporates text from a publication now in the public domain: Laughton, John Knox (1900). "Williams, William Peere (1742–1832)". In Lee, Sidney (ed.). Dictionary of National Biography. Vol. 61. London: Smith, Elder & Co. pp. 470, 471.
