= William George Fairfax =

British Royal Navy officer (1739–1813)

Vice-Admiral Sir William George Fairfax
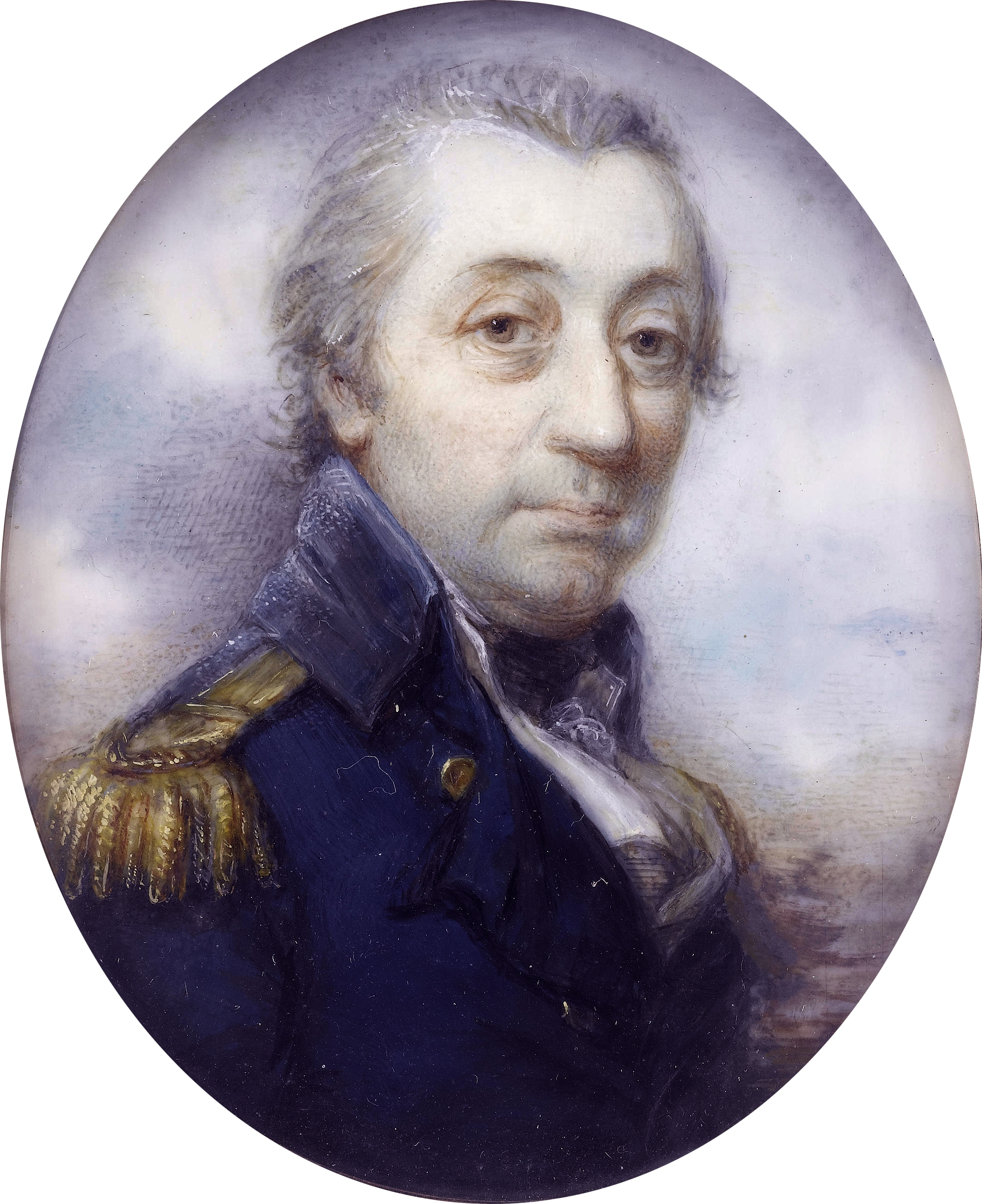
- Portrait by William Grimaldi, 1798
- Born: 8 March 1739; Bagshot, Surrey, England
- Died: 17 November 1813 (aged 74); Edinburgh, Scotland
- Spouse(s): Hannah Spears; Janet Margaret Charters
- Children: 6, including Mary Somerville
- Military career
- Allegiance: Kingdom of Great Britain; United Kingdom of Great Britain and Ireland
- Branch: Royal Navy
- Service years: 1750–1813
- Rank: Vice-Admiral
- Commands: HMS Greyhound; HMS Alert; HMS Tartar; HMS Sheerness; HMS Repulse; HMS Venerable; HMS Quebec
- Conflicts: Seven Years' War; Raid on St Malo; Gulf of S. Lawrence campaign; American Revolutionary War; Action of 17 June 1778; French Revolutionary War; Battle of Camperdown
- Awards: Knight bachelor (1797); Colonel of Marines (1799)

Sir William George Fairfax (8 March 1739 – 7 November 1813) was a vice-admiral in the Royal Navy and the progenitor of the Fairfax Baronets. His most notable service was as Admiral Adam Duncan's flag captain on board HMS Venerable during the Battle of Camperdown on 11 October 1797.

== Life ==
William was born in Bagshot, the eldest son of Joseph Fairfax of the Horse Guards and Mary Anne. He married firstly Hannah Spears (d.1770) in 1767, and secondly in 1772, Janet Margaret Charters. William was the father of eight children. His daughter, Mary Somerville was a noted science writer and polymath.

== Career ==
He joined the Royal Navy in 1750 aboard HMS Centurion, under Admiral First Lord Augustus Keppel, later moving to HMS Mars, HMS Garland and HMS Duke. He was commissioned a lieutenant on 20 December 1757, and later served on HMS Eurus off North America. He was in reserve between 1760 and 1766 and again between 1769 and 1776 with a brief break aboard HMS Greyhound and at the start of the American Revolutionary War he returned to service but was captured by the French in August 1778 and spent the rest of the war (1775-1783) as a prisoner of war.

In 1782 Fairfax was released as a post captain and briefly commanded HMS Tartar. In 1790 he took command of HMS Sheerness and in 1796 became flag captain of HMS Venerable under Admiral Adam Duncan and was heavily engaged at the Battle of Camperdown the following year. For his service in the battle, Fairfax was knighted and in 1797. He was subsequently made a rear-admiral but had made an enemy of Lord Spencer and was permanently placed in reserve. In 1810 he was promoted to Vice-Admiral of the Red and died in Edinburgh in 1813. His fourth son Henry Fairfax was made a baronet in 1836 in recognition of his father's service.

== Family ==
In 1767 he married Hannah Spears (1740-1770) daughter of Rev Robert Spears minister of Burntisland in Fife.

== Promotions ==
- Commander, 13 May 1778
- Captain, 12 January 1782
- Rear-Admiral of the Blue, 1 January 1801
- Rear-Admiral of the White, 23 April 1804
- Rear-Admiral of the Red, 9 November 1805
- Vice-Admiral of the Blue, 13 December 1806
- Vice-Admiral of the White, 25 October 1809
- Vice-Admiral of the Red, 31 July 1810
