= Tom Bowling =

Tom Bowling may refer to:

- A character in the novel The Adventures of Roderick Random
- An 18th-century song by Charles Dibdin
- The fourth movement of the Fantasia on British Sea Songs by Sir Henry Wood, which uses the melody of Dibdin's song
- A bay at North Cape (New Zealand)
