= Philip Patton =

Royal Navy Admiral (1739–1815)

Admiral Philip Patton
- Born: 27 October 1739; Anstruther, Fife
- Died: 31 December 1815 (aged 76); Fareham, Hampshire
- Military career
- Allegiance: United Kingdom
- Branch: Royal Navy
- Service years: 1755–1815
- Rank: Admiral
- Commands: HMS Aetna; HMS Thorn; HMS Namur; HMS Prince George; HMS Milford; HMS Belle Poule; The Downs
- Conflicts: Seven Years' War; Action of 8 June 1755; Siege of Louisbourg; Battle of Lagos; Battle of Quiberon Bay; Capture of Belle Île; Siege of Havana; American Revolutionary War; Battle of Cape St Vincent; Battle of Dogger Bank

Admiral Philip Patton (27 October 1739 – 31 December 1815) was a Royal Navy officer.

== Naval career ==
Educated at Kirkcaldy's grammar school, Patton joined the Royal Navy in 1755. As a junior officer he saw action at the Battle of Lagos in August 1759, the Battle of Quiberon Bay in November 1759 and the attack on Havana in June 1762. Promoted to commander in May 1778, he was given command of the bomb vessel HMS Aetna at that time and of the second-rate HMS Prince George the following year.

Promoted to captain in March 1779, he commanded Prince George at the attack on the Caracas Convoy and the Battle of Cape St. Vincent in January 1780. He was given command of the fifth-rate HMS Belle Poule in February 1781 and commanded her at the Battle of Dogger Bank in August 1781. Promoted to rear-admiral on 1 June 1795 and to vice-admiral on 1 January 1801, he became commander-in-chief Downs Station in 1803 and a Naval Lord in May 1804 before being promoted to full admiral on 4 June 1814.

Military offices
Preceded by Edward Thornbrough	Commander-in-Chief, The Downs; 1803–1804	Succeeded by John Holloway
