= Battle of Cape St Mary =

The Battle of Cape St Mary may refer to:

- Battle of Cape St Mary (1781) between the British and Dutch
- Battle of Cape St Mary (1804) between the British and Spanish
