= Gerardus Oorthuys =

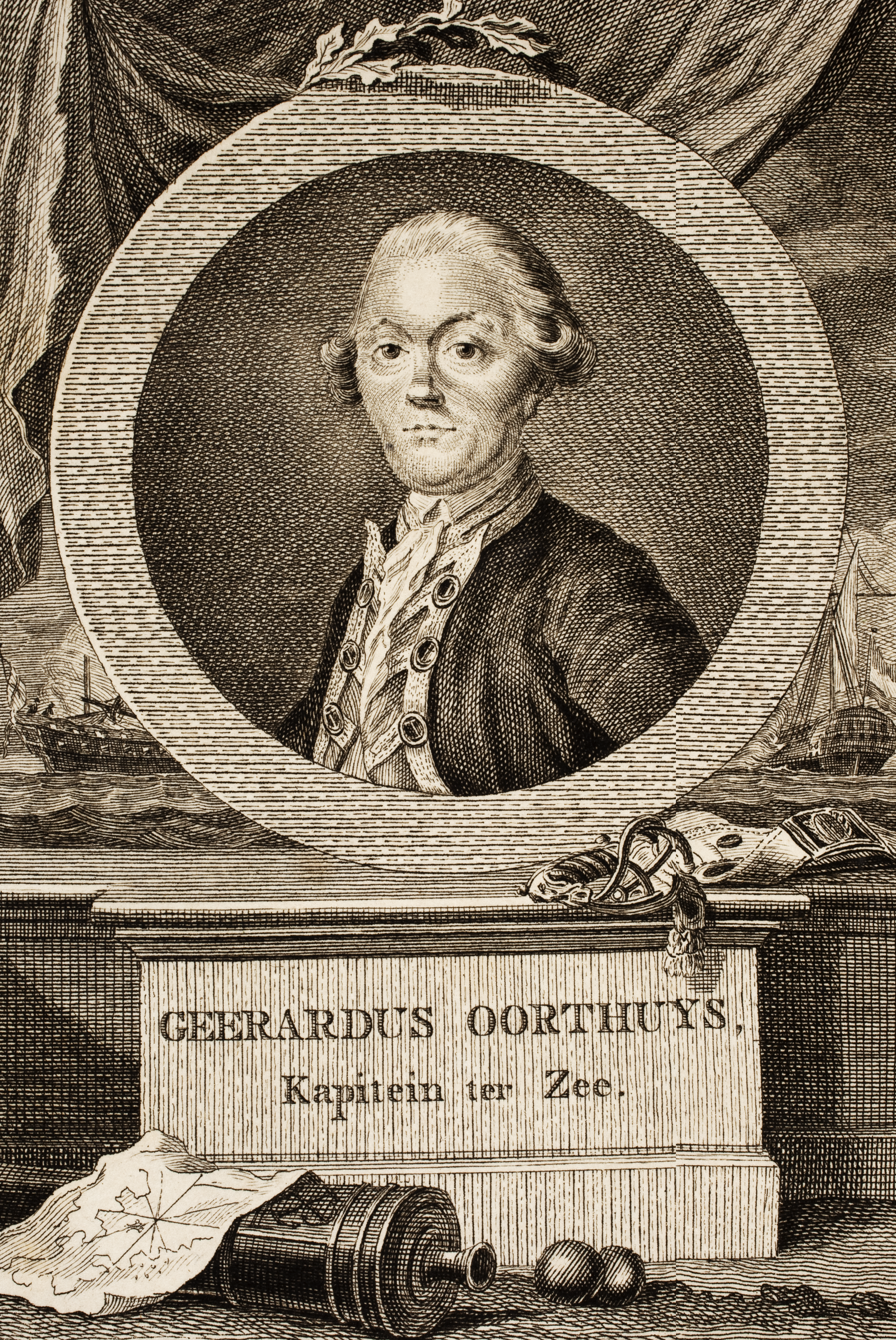
Portrait of Oorthuys

Captain-at-Sea Gerardus Oorthuys (1742 – 23 August 1812) was a Dutch States Navy officer who served in the Fourth Anglo-Dutch War. He was born in 1742 at Groningen. During the Fourth Anglo-Dutch War, Oorthuys participated in the action of 30 May 1781, in which he commanded the 36-gun frigate Den Briel and fought alongside the 36-gun frigate Castor against two Royal Navy frigates, the 36-gun Flora and 28-gun Crescent. Den Briel forced Crescent's commander Captain Thomas Pakenham to strike his colours but was unable to take possession before being driven off by Flora. Following the action, Oorthuys was compared to earlier Dutch naval officers such as Michiel de Ruyter and Maarten Tromp. Oorthuys married Elisabeth Rebecca Rijfsnijder at some point in his life and died on 23 August 1812.
