= Jean Isaac Chadeau de la Clocheterie =

French naval officer (1741–1782)

Jean Isaac Timothée Chadeau Sieur de la Clocheterie
- Born: 23 February 1741; Rochefort sur Mer
- Died: 12 April 1782 (aged 41) at the Battle of the Saintes
- Military career
- Branch: French navy
- Service years: 1754–1782
- Rank: Captain
- Commands: Belle Poule, Triton, Jason, Hercule
- Conflicts: Seven Years' War; American Revolutionary War – Battle of Cape Henry, Battle of Saint Kitts, Battle of the Saintes

Jean Isaac Timothée Chadeau, Sieur de la Clocheterie (1741–1782) was a French naval officer of the American Revolutionary War.

== Biography ==
=== Early career ===
Chadeau de la Clocheterie entered the French naval service in 1754, at the age of thirteen, as an élève de la marine. He became an ensign in 1757 and served in the Seven Years' War (1756–1763). On 2 November 1758 he was made a prisoner of war at the capture of the Belliqueux, returning to France in April 1759.

In 1768 he was stationed at Mauritius. There he met the botanist Jacques-Henri Bernardin de Saint-Pierre, who described him as "a young man, with a dashing figure, very modest, who hardly spoke and was devoted to his duties".

In 1775 he was made a Knight of the Order of Saint Louis.

=== Belle Poule ===
As Lieutenant commanding the frigate Belle Poule, La Clocheterie fought the action of 17 June 1778 against HMS Arethusa, the casus belli that precipitated the French entry into the American Revolutionary War. Despite suffering heavy casualties, Belle Poule heavily damaged Arethusa before being towed to safety through the coastal shallows of Brittany.

La Clocheterie was received at the French court by Louis XVI and promoted to captain. He was given command of Triton, a 64-gun ship of the line. According to a widely circulated anecdote, the king informed him of his new commission during a game of piquet, taking him to task for his infidelity to his ship, and when de la Clocheterie expressed surprise saying "You are sure to abandon the Belle Poule to be captain of a ship with 64 guns."

Not only the engagement, but also La Clocheterie's reception at court and his reward were reported in British, French, Spanish, German, Swiss, and Dutch reviews of current affairs of the year 1778.

=== Subsequent career ===
Captain de la Clocheterie became commander of Jason in early 1780, and fought at the Battle of Cape Henry and the Battle of Saint Kitts, particularly distinguishing himself in the former engagement.

He died in 1782, in the Battle of the Saintes, commanding Hercule.
