= Charles de Kermovan de Gouzillon =

French Navy officer of the War of American Independence

Charles de Kermovan de Gouzillon (Note: Also written "Kermovant". Gouzillon was also Count of Kermeno.) was a French Navy officer. He served in the War of American Independence.

== Biography ==
Gouzillon was the first son of his parents. He was brother to Chef de Division Andrée-Marie de Gouzillon de Bélizal, and cousin to Lieutenant Jean-Michel-Guillaume de Gouzillon. Kermovan de Gouzillon joined the Navy as a Garde-Marine on 4 July 1754.

He was promoted to Lieutenant on 1 February 1770. In 1778, he was the first officer of the 64-gun Éveillé, under Captain du Botderu, in the squadron under Orvilliers.

On 4 April 1780, Gouzillon was promoted to Captain. He commanded the 64-gun Ardent at the Battle of the Saintes, and was wounded several times during the battle.

He retired on 6 March 1785.
