= Action of 17 June 1778 =

1778 battle of the American Revolutionary War

- Part of the Anglo-French War
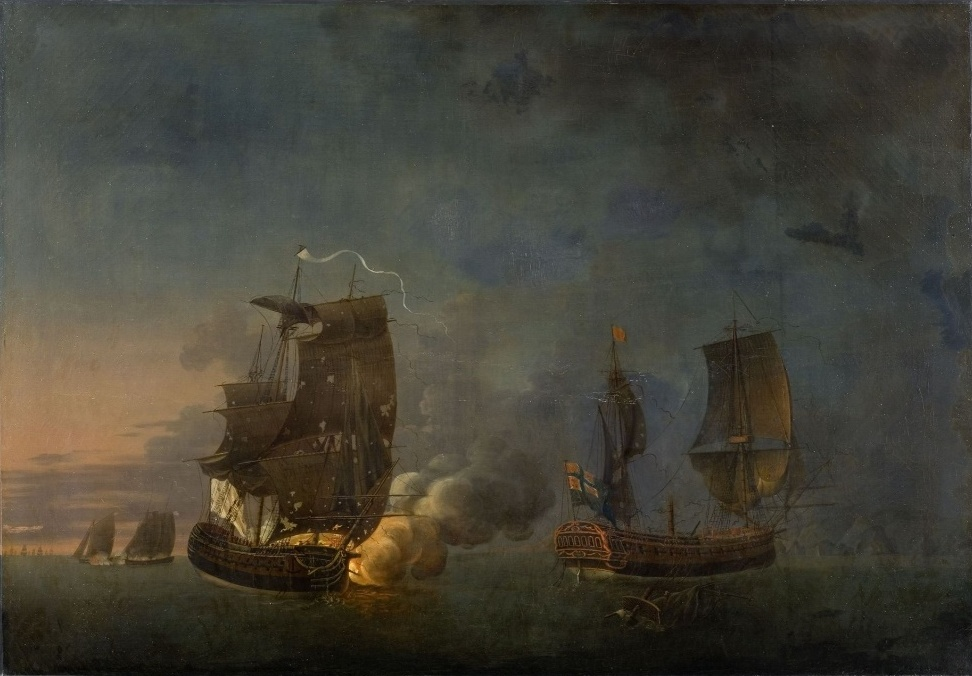
- Fight of the Belle Poule and the Arethusa; Auguste-Louis de Rossel de Cercy, 1789
Date	17 June 1778
Location	23 miles (37 km) south of The Lizard, Atlantic Ocean
Result	See Aftermath

Belligerents
Great Britain	France

Commanders and leaders
Augustus Keppel	Jean Clocheterie

Strength
1 ship of the line 2 frigates 1 cutter	2 frigates 1 corvette

Casualties and losses
44 killed or wounded	107 killed or wounded (Note: Charles Cunat gives a figure of 40 killed and 57 wounded.); 1 frigate captured

The action of 17 June 1778 (also known as the fight of Belle Poule and Arethusa) was a single-ship action that took place off the coast of France between British and French frigates. It was widely celebrated in both France and Great Britain and was the first engagement fought between the two nations during the American Revolutionary War before a formal declaration of war was even announced.

== Background ==
On 13 June 1778, Admiral Augustus Keppel, with twenty-one ships of the line and three frigates, was dispatched by the Admiralty to keep watch over the French fleet at Brest; Keppel was to prevent a junction of the Brest and Toulon fleets, more by persuasion if he could since both nations were not at war. The French 26-gun frigate, Belle Poule was on a reconnaissance along with the 26-gun frigate Licorne, the corvette Hirondelle, and the cutter Coureur, when on 17 June she encountered a large British squadron that included HMS Arethusa at a point 23 miles (37 km) south of The Lizard.

Admiral Keppel, commanding the British fleet, ordered that the French ships be pursued and returned to his flagship by any means since he did not want the French ships to see the British strength.

== Action ==
Licorne did so, after being overhauled by two British ships HMS Milford, mounting 28 guns, and HMS America, of 64 guns. Licorne subsequently tried to escape during the night after having meditated on affairs, but surrendered after a brief combat with America, a vessel double her size.

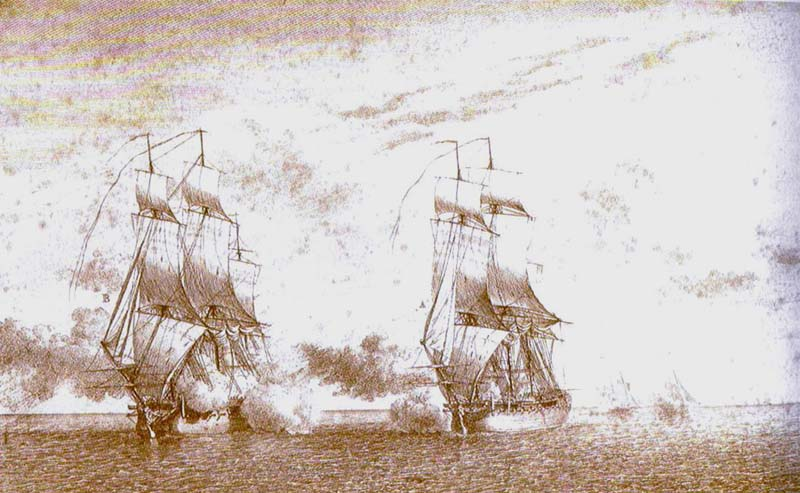
Beginning of the action

Meanwhile, Arethusa and the cutter HMS Alert caught up to Belle Poule, accompanied by the French cutter Le Courier. The captain of Belle Poule refused the order to sail back to the British fleet. The British fired a warning shot across his ship's bow, to which he responded with a full broadside. Thus a furious, two-hour battle between the two ships with Arethusa. Belle Poule was eager to escape and soon began to inflict serious damage upon Arethusa, which ended up with her topmasts hanging over the side and canvas torn. Soon after Arethusa lay shattered and then lost her main mast.

Soon the wind fell and with it the shot-torn loftier sails of Belle Poule. However, they held enough wind to drift her out of the reach of Arethusa's fire. Both ships were close under the French cliffs and Belle Poule struggled into a tiny cove in the rocks. Nothing remained for Arethusa but to cut away her wreckage, hoist what sail she could, and drag herself back under jury-masts to the British fleet.

Meanwhile, Coureur was overtaken by the British cutter Alert, and after some resistance finally cooperated with being taken to Keppel's flagship. Hirondelle escaped the engagement entirely.

== Aftermath ==
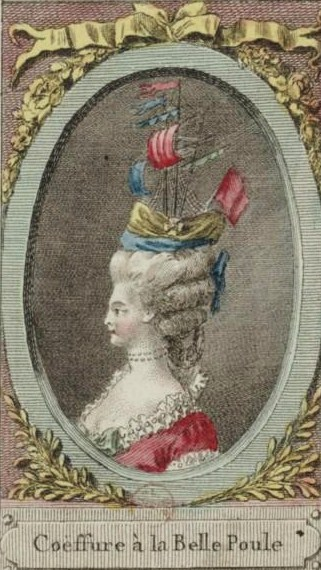
A Frenchwoman wearing a Belle Poule coeffure

Arethusa suffered 44 casualties from her 198-man crew, but the masts and rigging had been so severely damaged that the ship had to be towed by newly arrived British ships. As other ships from Keppel's fleet approached, Belle Poule withdrew toward the French coast having lost 30 killed and 72 wounded, among them her captain, Lieutenant Jean Isaac Chadeau de la Clocheterie.

This battle was the first between British and French naval forces during the Anglo-French War and took place around three weeks before the formal declaration of war by France. Admiral Keppel himself was surprised by the reaction of the French captains as he only intended to speak with them, and then release their ships. The battle was widely celebrated in France as a victory; ladies of the high society invented the hairstyle "Belle Poule", with a ship on the top of the head. With the capture of Licorne and Hirondelle it was also viewed as a victory in Britain and became the subject of a traditional Sea shanty, The Saucy Arethusa. (Roud # 12675). Arethusa is also the subject of a song on the Decemberists' album Her Majesty the Decemberists.
