= The Saucy Arethusa =

Traditional song

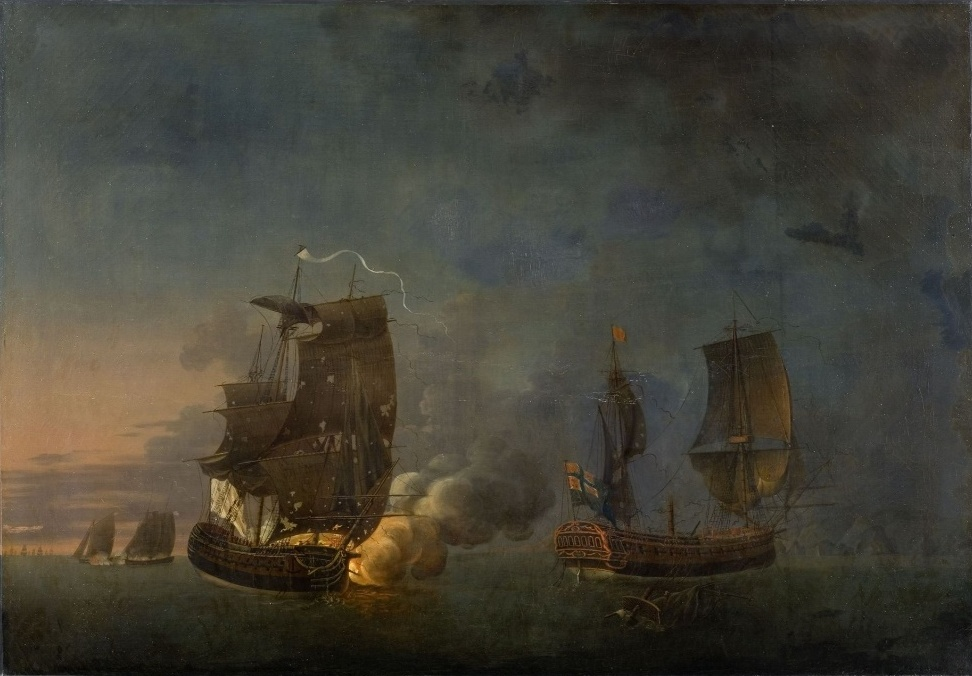
Painting by Auguste-Louis de Rossel de Cercy depicting the fight of Belle Poule and Arethusa

The Saucy Arethusa is a nautical song (Roud 12675) which, although usually considered "traditional", has been attributed to Prince Hoare, a comic opera librettist, as part of a "musical entertainment" titled The Lock and Key, performed at the Theatre Royal, Covent Garden in 1796.

The melody to the song has been wrongly attributed to William Shield, who was the musical arranger of The Lock and Key. It is more rightfully known as a piece by the Irish harper and composer Turlough O'Carolan called Miss MacDermott or The Princess Royal.

The "Arethusa" of the title is a frigate of the Royal Navy, named HMS Arethusa, which was originally built in 1757 as a French privateer under the name Pélerine, renamed Aréthuse in early 1758 when purchased for the French Navy, from whom she was captured in 1759. According to Greek mythology, the nymph Arethusa, for whom the ship was named, was transformed by Artemis into a fountain. The song chronicles an engagement in the English Channel on 17 June 1778 between the Arethusa and the French frigate, Belle Poule.

It opens

Come all ye jolly sailors bold
Whose hearts are cast in honour's mould
While English glory I unfold
Hurrah for the Arethusa

She is a frigate tight and brave
As ever stemmed the dashing wave
Her men are staunch to their favorite launch
And when the foe shall meet our fire
Sooner than strike we'll all expire
On board of the Arethusa

'Twas with the spring fleet she went out
The English Channel to cruise about
When four French sail in show so stout
Bore down on the Arethusa

When Sir Henry Wood wrote his Fantasia on British Sea Songs in 1905 a version of this song became the third movement.
