= Battle off Yarmouth (1777) =

1777 battle of the American Revolutionary War

- Part of the American Revolutionary War
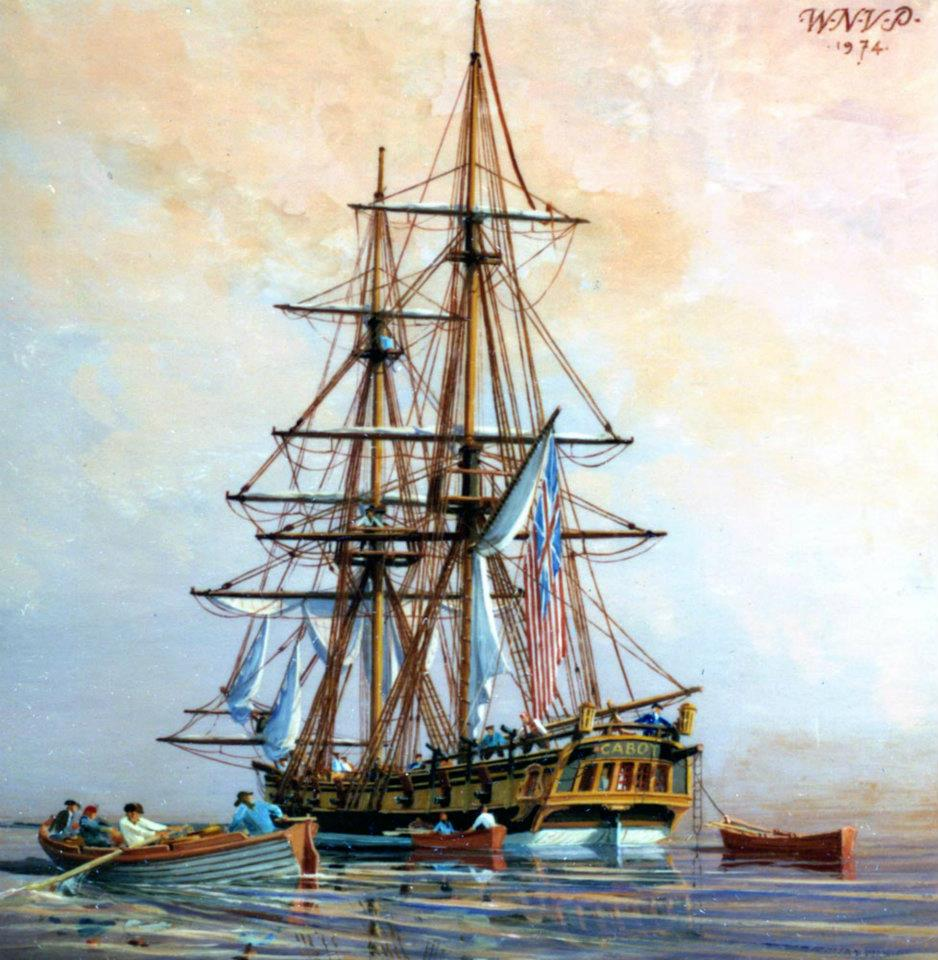
- USS Cabot, which was captured at the battle
Date	28 March 1777
Location	Yarmouth, Nova Scotia
Result	British victory

Belligerents
Great Britain	United States

Commanders and leaders
John Burr	Joseph Olney

Strength
1 frigate	3 brigs

Casualties and losses
Unknown	1 brig captured

The Battle off Yarmouth took place on 28 March 1777 during the American Revolutionary War off the coast of Yarmouth, Nova Scotia. The battle is the first American armed vessel to engage the Royal Navy. British frigate HMS Milford forced the American USS Cabot aground and the American crew escaped among the inhabitants of Yarmouth.

== Background ==
During the American Revolution, Americans regularly attacked Nova Scotia by land and sea. American privateers devastated the maritime economy by raiding many of the coastal communities, (Note: Benjamin Franklin also engaged France in the war, which meant that many of the privateers were also from France.) such as the numerous raids on Liverpool and on Annapolis Royal.

== Battle ==
Three American vessels (brigantines) – Massachusetts (Captain John Fisk), Tyrannicide (Captain Jonathan Harriden) and the brig Cabot (Captain Olney) - were sailing toward Nova Scotia and were confronted at 11:00 pm by British frigate HMS Milford. They waited until morning before they decided to attack. During the morning hours Cabot had been separated from the other two ships. Then the weather became "thick and rainy" until 6:00 pm. When the weather cleared Milford pursued Cabot. The wind and waves remained high and the pursuit lasted for several days and nights. Captain Olney realized Cabot was being overtaken and steered to the Nova Scotia shore and beached the vessel near Chebogue River, a short distance from Yarmouth.

== Aftermath ==
The crew of 140 got safely to shore and escaped into the village of Chebogue. Local residents Captain Zacharias Foote and his nephew Captain Richard Valpey housed and fed thirty of the crew for a few weeks until they were able to secure a vessel back to Portsmouth, New Hampshire. One observer noted that Captain Foote's "unbounded liberality to American prisoners is Well known to many." On separate occasions, Foote and Valpey were later imprisoned by the Americans. Captain Olney advocated for Foote's release, which was successful. After this period, Foote continued to trade with Boston the release of American prisoners for other goods and supplies. American privateers remained a threat to Nova Scotian ports for the rest of the war. For example, after a failed attempt to raid Chester, Nova Scotia, American privateers struck again in the Raid on Lunenburg in 1782.

Milford took 14 days to get Cabot afloat and then sent it to Halifax.

== See also ==
- American Revolution - Nova Scotia theatre
- Massachusetts Naval Militia
