= HMS Pilote =

Brig of the Royal Navy

History

France
- Name: Pilote
- Builder: Jacques and Danie Denys, Dunkirk
- Laid down: July 1778
- Launched: November 1778
- Captured: 2 October 1779

Great Britain
- Name: HMS Pilote
- Acquired: 2 October 1779 by capture
- Fate: Sold 1784

General characteristics
- Class & type: Mutin-class
- Type: Cutter
- Tons burthen: 21837/94 (bm)
- Length: 78 ft 6 3/4 in (23.9 m) (overall); 60 ft 5 3/8 in (18.4 m) (keel)
- Beam: 26 ft 0 3/4 in (7.9 m)
- Depth of hold: 10 ft 2 1/2 in (3.1 m)
- Propulsion: Sails
- Sail plan: Cutter until 1794 when Brig
- Complement: 70
- Armament: Initially:14 × 4-pounder guns + 10 × ½-pounder swivel guns; 1790s: 12-pounder carronades replaced the 4-pounder guns
- Notes: Clinker-built

HMS Pilote was a cutter launched for the French Navy at Dunkirk in 1778. The British Royal Navy captured her in 1779 and took her into service under her existing name. It sold her in 1799.

== Origin and capture ==
Pilote was commissioned in Dunkirk in March 1779 under Captain Denys. She was valued at 58,700 livres tournois.

On 2 October 1779, HMS Jupiter captured two French cutters, each of 14 guns and 120 men. One was Mutin, under the command of Chevalier de Roquefeuil. She was pierced for 16 guns but carried 14, either 4 or 6-pounders. The other was Pilote, under the command of Chevalier de Clonard. She carried the same armament as Mutine (or Mutin). The cutters surrendered after an engagement that left Mutin dismasted. The Royal Navy took both into service essentially under their existing names. Jupiter shared the prize money with Apollo, Crescent, and Milford.

== HMS ==
Pilote underwent fitting at Plymouth between 28 March and 12 July 1780. Lieutenant Richard Boger commissioned her in May for the Irish Sea. She shared with Echo and Kite in the proceeds of the capture on 24 December of the Dutch vessel Vryhied. That same day and the day before, Pilote was in company with Rattlesnake and they shared in the proceeds of the capture of Jussrow Johanna, Adriana, and Vrow Maria. Pilote shared with a number of other vessels in the proceeds of the taking of the Union American, and the retaking of the brig Industry.

In April 1781 Pilote was at Plymouth again where she underwent copper sheathing. In 1781 Pilote captured the Dutch vessel Linderbloom. (Note: The High Court of Admiralty condemned her on 5 September 1781. She was made free at Plymouth on 29 January 1782, after which Liverpool merchants purchased her and named her Experiment. She was of 39742/94 tons burthen. She is last listed in Lloyd's Register for 1790, which gives her burthen as 307 tons, and her origin as Prussia. She was lost near Memel while sailing from Memel to Liverpool.)

Pilote was under the command of Lieutenant Charles Seymour Lynn on 5 December 1782 when she captured the Dutch ship Fortunée. She was paid off in May 1783 and then Lynn recommissioned her.

Between 1786 and 1787 Pilote was under the command of Lieutenant Warwick Oben.

From 1791 she was still in the Irish Sea and under the command of Lieutenant Henry Gunter. In March 1793 she was driven on shore at Waterford from her moorings.

Between June and July 1794 Pilote was yet again at Plymouth undergoing work, this time for conversion to a brig. Pilote was under the command of Lieutenant Jackson Dowsing when she captured the French vessel Maria Theresa.

Pilote was among the many vessels that benefited from the proceeds of the Dutch men of war, East Indiamen, and other merchant vessels that the navy seized at Plymouth on 20 January 1795.

In 1795 Pilote was under the command of Lieutenant Farmery Predam Epworth. While in Pilote he carried dispatches to the West Indies and the Channel Fleet. He received promotion to Commander in Wasp in December 1796.

In 1797 she was under the command of Lieutenant Henry Compton. On 26 May she captured the French privateer lugger Justine Adélaïde. Pilote had seen a convoy safely to St Helens when she encountered and captured Justine Adélaïde ten leagues SSE from Beachy Head. Justine Adélaïde mounted two guns and two swivel guns, carried a chest of small arms, and had a crew of 20 men. She was three days out of Fecamp, but had taken nothing. (Note: Justine Adélaïde's home port is currently unknown,. She was commissioned in early 1797, with 20 men and 2 guns.)

On 12 July Pilote captured the Danish ship Emilie, and her cargo. In June 1798 Pilote recaptured the brig Amity.

On 28 June Pilote was in company with the 50-gun fourth rate Romney, Wolverine, and Plover, also later Daphne, and possibly the 24-gun post ship Champion, when they fell in with a Swedish convoy of 21 merchant vessels and their escort, a 44-gun frigate. Because Sweden and Britain were not at war, Captain Lawford of Romney shadowed the convoy while sending a lieutenant back to the Admiralty for instructions. On 30 June the lieutenant returned, but his instructions are now lost. Lawford decided to detain the Swedish merchant vessels, which he did on 1 and 2 July, without the Swedish frigate intervening. Ultimately, the Swedish vessels sailed into Margate where they were held for some months before the authorities sent most on their way. Prize money for some part of the capture was paid in June 1804.

== Fate ==
The "Principal Officers and Commissioners of His Majesty's Navy" offered "His Majesty's Brig Pilote, of the Burthen of 218 Tons, Coppered and Copper-fastened, with Masts, Yards, Furniture, and Stores, as per Inventory" at Sheerness on 29 April 1799. They sold Pilote at Sheerness in May to Robert Elliot for £920.
