= USS Yankee Hero =

History

United States
- Name: USS Yankee Hero
- Commissioned: 13 January 1776
- Captured: 7 June 1776

Great Britain
- Name: HMS Postillion
- Acquired: 7 June 1776
- Fate: Sold 1779

General characteristics
- Type: Sloop
- Tonnage: 120
- Decks: 1
- Complement: 40-60 officers and men
- Armament: 14 guns

Service record
- Commanders: Thomas Thomas, Jan. 1776 - Feb. 1776; James Tracy, Feb. 1776 - Jun. 1776

USS Yankee Hero was a 14-gun sloop of the Continental Navy commissioned in Massachusetts on January 13, 1776. She was under the command of Captain James Tracy until she was captured by the British on June 7, 1776.

== As USS Yankee Hero ==
Captain Tracy and a small crew left Newburyport for Boston to take on a full crew for a six-month patrol. As the ship rounded Cape Ann, they spotted another sail. As the Yankee Hero was short-handed, Tracy decided to let it pass. However, some local sailors rendezvoused with them at sea and told them that several transports had been seen close to the Cape that day. Supplemented with fourteen of the local men, bringing his crew to 40 (other accounts say 52), Tracy set after the distant ship. When they had approached to within six miles, they could see that it was a ship of war, HMS Milford. Still short-handed and ill-prepared for a fight, the Captain changed his mind again and ordered the ship around. However, the Milford had spotted them by this time and gave chase. Heavily outgunned and outmanned, the Yankee Hero's crew was decimated and the ship disabled. At least four of the crew were killed and thirteen wounded, including Captain Tracy.

Considering the great difference in capabilities of the two ships (the Americans had 14 guns, while the British had 32 guns), the Yankee Hero and her crew fought well for two hours before Tracy ordered the colors struck.

== As HMS Postillion ==
The Yankee Hero was refitted by the British and recommissioned as HMS Postillion in August 1776. Richard Frothingham, in his History of the Siege of Boston, stated that the Yankee Hero was among the vessels that the British stationed at Nantasket after evacuating Boston in March 1776, but that is probably incorrect since the British did not have possession of her until almost three months later.
