= French frigate Vénus (1780) =

History

France
- Name: Vénus
- Namesake: Venus
- Builder: St. Malo
- Launched: 1780
- Fate: Ran aground, 5 August 1781

General characteristics
- Type: Frigate
- Displacement: 1,082 tonneaux
- Tons burthen: 600 port tonneaux
- Armament: 32 guns

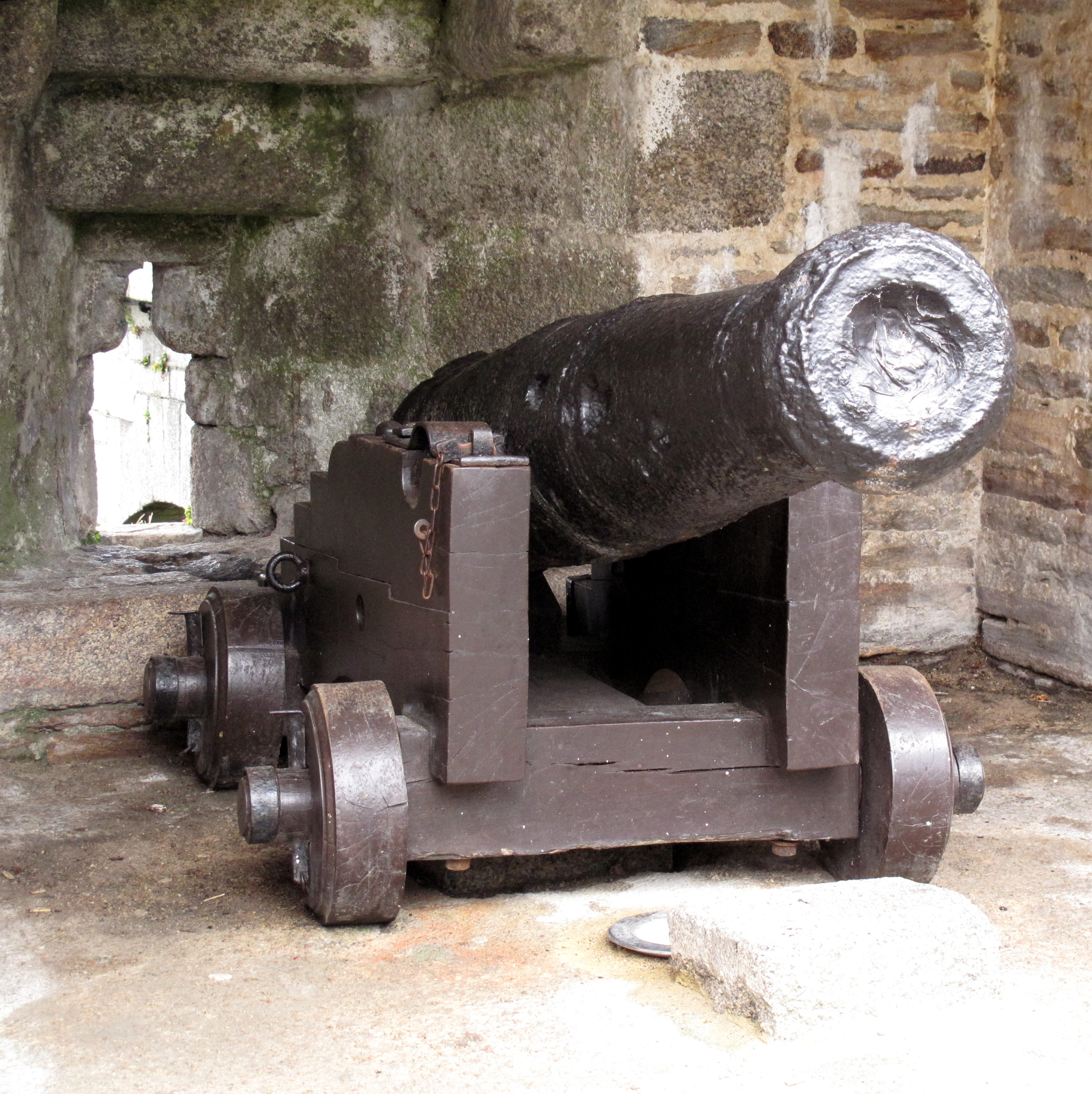
Gun of the Vénus, on display in Concarneau

Vénus was a 32-gun frigate of the French Navy, lead ship of her class.

== Career ==
Vénus was launched in Saint-Malo in 1780. Under Captain Gouzillon de Bélizal, she patrolled between Île de Ré, Nantes and Brest and escorted convoys. In this capacity, she captured the British privateer Lord Amherst on 16 June 1781.

She was wrecked on 5 August 1781 near Glénan Islands, off Concarneau, when she ran aground due to a navigation error of the pilot. The crew was saved, but in spite of efforts to refloat her, she became a total loss.

Her guns were found in 1978, and are now on display in Concarneau.
