= Joseph Olney =

American naval officer (1737–1814)

Joseph Olney (1737 in Rhode Island – 1814 in Hudson, Columbia County, New York) was a native of Rhode Island and a leading naval officer during the American Revolution. He had also been involved with the Raid of Nassau, Battle of Block Island and the Battle off Yarmouth (1777), among other naval engagements.

== Career ==
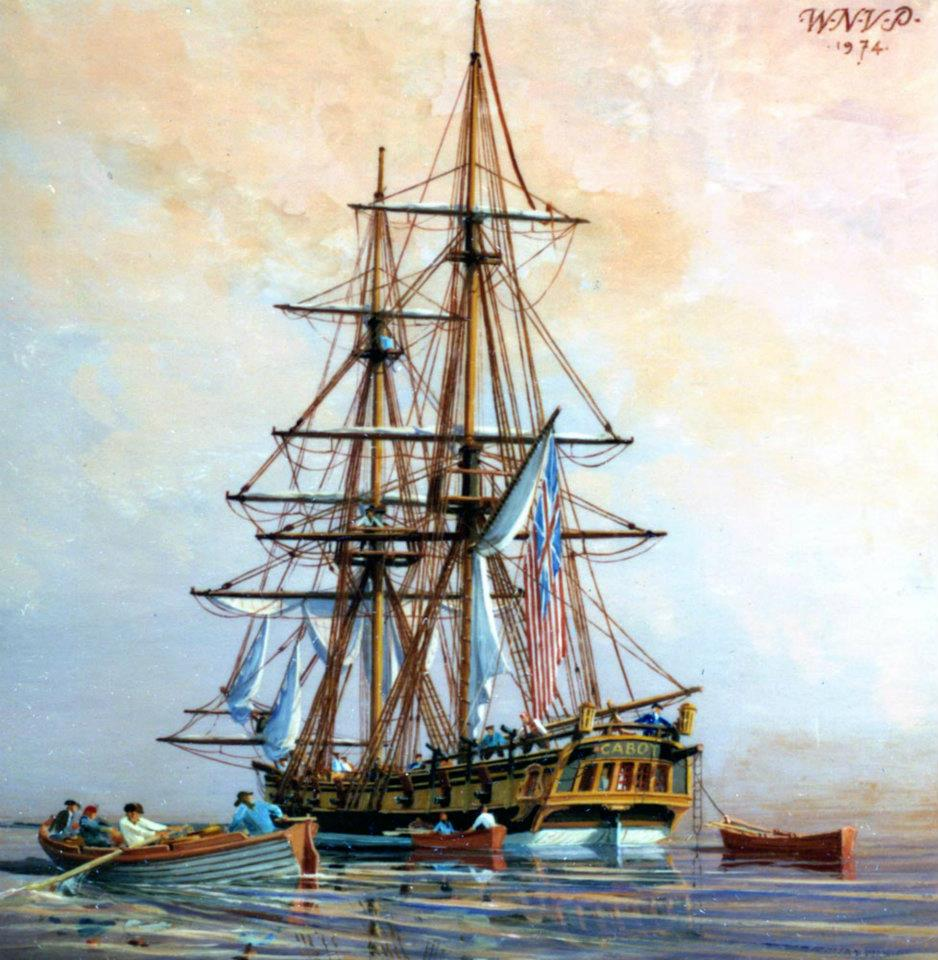
USS Cabot, which Olney captained in 1776

Olney was commissioned by Congress on 22 December 1775 as the second-ranking second lieutenant. On board the USS Columbus (Abraham Whipple), Olney was involved in the Raid of Nassau and the Battle off Block Island.

The Columbus captured the Royal Exchange on 29 August 1776 and Olney was assigned as prizemaster of the ship Royal Exchange and he brought it into Portsmouth, New Hampshire on 26 September 1776. He was commended for treating his prisoners with care, which helped him quell a mutiny aboard the prize.

On 10 October 1776 he became captain of the USS Cabot. Olney was on gunner James Bryant's court-martial, held on USS Alfred at Newport on 23 October 1776, as a captain.

He took command of the Columbus at Newport, on 26 October 1776, upon Whipple's leaving.

On January 1777 he was ordered to Boston, Massachusetts, to take command of the Continental Navy brig Cabot. Cabot encountered HM frigate Milford (Captain John Ford) on 28 March, off Nova Scotia. After a two-day chase the brig was driven ashore near the mouth of the Chebogue River. Olney and the crew escaped ashore. After being sheltered by the locals for a number of weeks, he took a small schooner, and returned to Boston. A court-of-inquiry cleared Olney of responsibility for the loss.

Olney had to wait until May 1778 for his next command, the Continental Navy ship USS Queen of France (1777). He took command of her at Boston and began looking for a crew. By the end of 1778 he had a crew of 136 men aboard, and the ship was wooded, watered and provisioned. She dropped down to Nantasket Road to await last-minute work.

His brother George Olney was the secretary and quartermaster for Major General Nathanael Greene throughout the war. Another brother was Jeremiah Olney, who died in 1812. Two years later, Olney died and was buried in the Olney Farm Cemetery at North Providence, Rhode Island.

== See also ==
- Nova Scotia in the American Revolution
