= HMS Alert (1777) =

HMS Alert was a 10-gun cutter launched at Dover in 1777 that was converted to a sloop in the same year.

On 19 September 1777, during the American War of Independence, Alert caught and engaged the American 16-gun brigantine Lexington in the English Channel. After two hours fighting, Lexington damaged Alert's rigging, and broke off the action, but Alert's crew quickly managed to repair the ship and caught up with Lexington, which was now virtually out of ammunition and unable to reply to Alert's fire. After a further one and a half hours bombardment by Alert, Lexington struck her colours, surrendering to Alert. Lexington had lost 7 men killed with 11 wounded, while Alert had two killed and 3 wounded. During the action of 17 June 1778, Alert engaged the French 10-gun Lugger Coureur, and after 90 minutes, forced Coureur to strike.

Alert was captured in the Channel by the Junon on 17 July 1778; French records show her serving as Alerte, a cutter of fourteen 4-pounder guns and valued as a prize at Lt 32,289. She foundered December 1779 off the coast of America.
