= Action of 30 May 1781 =

1781 action of the Fourth Anglo-Dutch War

- Part of the Fourth Anglo-Dutch War
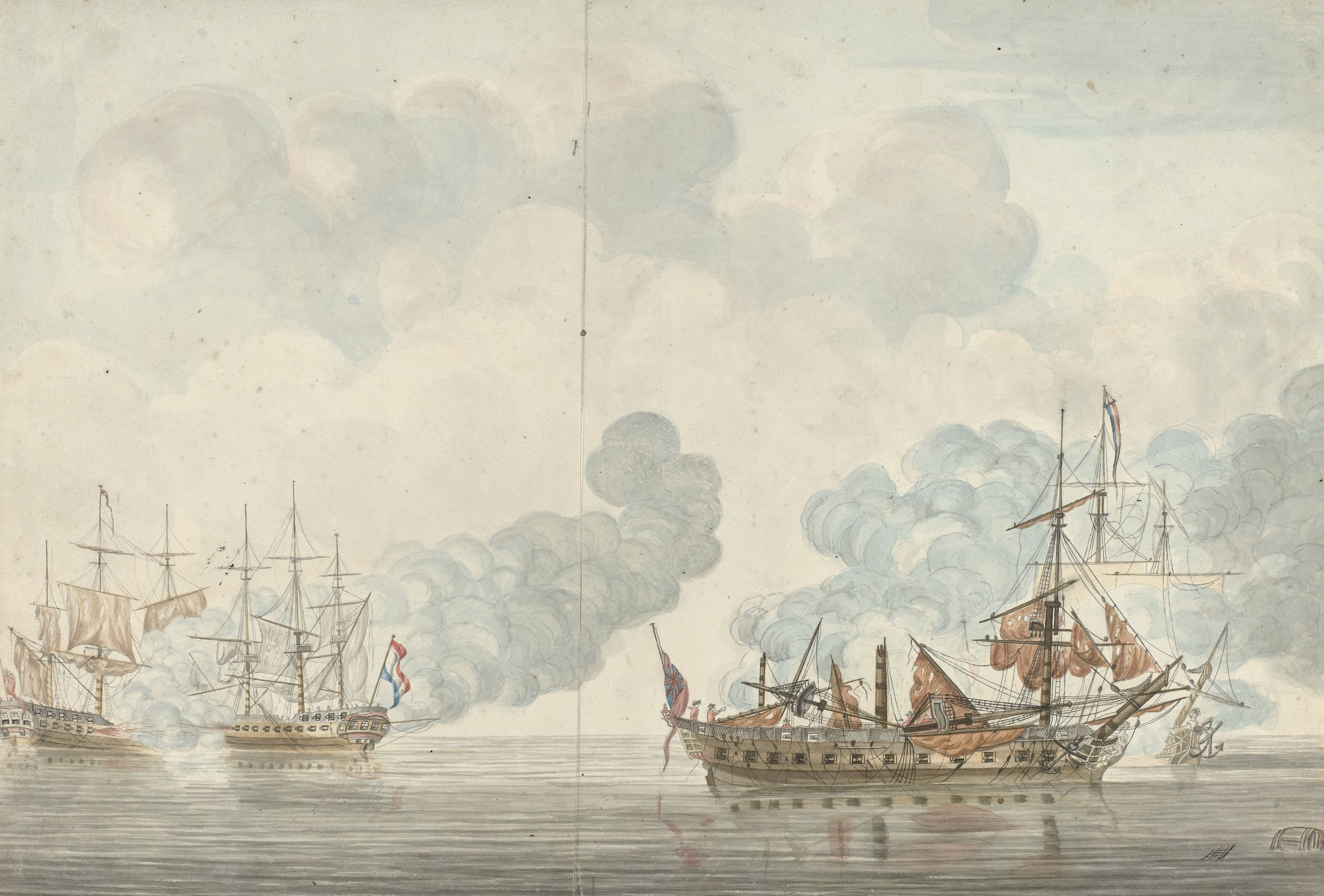
- 1782 illustration of the action
Date	30 May 1781
Location	Off Cabo de Santa Maria, Mediterranean Sea
Result	British victory

Belligerents
Great Britain	Dutch Republic

Commanders and leaders
Thomas Pakenham; William Freeman	Gerardus Oorthuys; Pieter Melvill (surrendered)

Strength
2 frigates	2 frigates

Casualties and losses
27 killed 65 wounded	42 killed 84 wounded 240 captured 1 frigate captured

The action of 30 May 1781, also known as the Battle of Cape St Mary (Dutch: Zeegevecht bij Kaap Sint-Marie) was a naval battle fought between two Royal Navy frigates and two Dutch States Navy frigates off the Cabo de Santa Maria. In a battle lasting more than two hours, Captain William Peere Williams-Freeman of the 36-gun Flora, compelled Captain Pieter Melvill van Carnbee's 36-gun Castor to strike his colours. Shortly after, Captain Gerardus Oorthuys of the 36-gun Den Briel compelled Thomas Pakenham to strike the 28-gun Crescent. However, Flora came to Crescent's rescue before Oorthuys could board her, and forced him to retreat.

== Background ==
During the Fourth Anglo-Dutch War a fleet from the Dutch East Indies left the Mediterranean, escorted by the 36-gun frigates Castor under captain Pieter Melvill van Carnbee and the Den Briel under captain Gerardus Oorthuys. They did not pass Gibraltar unnoticed and were intercepted by two British frigates, the 36-gun Flora under captain William Peere Williams-Freeman and the 28-gun Crescent under captain Thomas Pakenham. The Dutch frigates reached the Atlantic and fired a salvo at their pursuers, frightening them off, but Carnbee decided not to pursue the faster British ships but to proceed with their primary objective of escorting the merchantmen. The Dutch ships thus turned south under cover of darkness to reach the Canary Islands.

== Battle ==
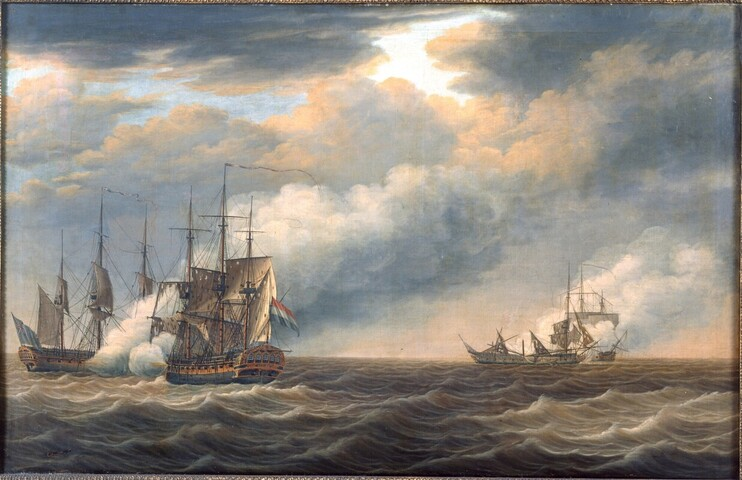
Painting of the action

On the morning of 30 May 1781 the Dutch saw the British ships following them. The British opened fire and Carnbee and Oorthuys tried and failed to get one of the British ships between them. The battle then became a ship-to-ship action between the Den Briel and the Crescent in one case and the Castor and the Flora in the other. The Castor was a 23-year-old ship with low calibre guns and a maximum salvo of 372 pounds, thus proving no match for the modern Flora with its 720-pound salvo. The Castor soon became unmanageable, with her sails and rigging destroyed, holes below the waterline, five feet of water in her hold, most of her guns out of action, 30 of her 230-man crew killed and 40 wounded. Carnbee hoisted a white flag, he and his crew were taken on board the Flora and the sinking Castor was taken in tow as a prize ship.

The battle between Den Briel and the Crescent was a mirror image of the defeat of the Castor. The guns of the Den Briel brought down the main-mast and mizzen-mast of the Crescent for only 12 dead and 44 wounded, compared to the toll on the Crescent of 27 dead and 65 wounded (including her captain, who was slightly injured). Both ships were badly damaged however and an hour after the Crescent surrendered the mast of the Den Briel fell overboard. The Dutch ship also did not have any boats left in a seaworthy condition to take the Crescent as a prize. The Crescent then managed to get taken in tow by the Flora and Oorthuys had to watch his prize escape.

== Aftermath ==
Using makeshift sails Oorthuys then reached the port of Cádiz on 2 June, whilst the fleet he was escorting also reached Spain without being attacked by the British. With two badly damaged ships in tow, Pakenham then met two French frigates in the English Channel and was defeated, though the Flora escaped. Pakenham had refused to resume the command of the Crescent, maintaining that by his surrender to the Den Briel his commission was cancelled, and that when recaptured the ship was on the same footing as any other prize. The Castor thus became a French prize (though it was beyond use and soon demolished in a French shipyard) and Carnbee and the Dutch prisoners were repatriated.

The battle became major news back in the Netherlands, with Carnbee and Oorthuys compared to earlier Dutch naval commanders such as Michiel de Ruyter and Maarten Tromp. In Britain, Pakenham was tried by court-martial for striking his colours to the Dutch but honourably acquitted, it being proved that he did not strike the flag till, by the fall of her masts and the disabling of her guns, further resistance was impossible.
