= Fantasia on British Sea Songs =

1905 medley by Sir Henry Wood

Fantasia on British Sea Songs or Fantasy on British Sea Songs is a medley of British sea songs arranged by Sir Henry Wood in 1905 to mark the centenary of the Battle of Trafalgar. For many years it has been an indispensable item at the BBC's Last Night of the Proms concert.

== Contents ==
The Fantasia on British Sea Songs was first performed by Henry Wood and the Queen's Hall Orchestra at a Promenade Concert on 21 October 1905. It comprises nine parts which follow the course of the Battle of Trafalgar from the point of view of a British sailor, starting with the call to arms, progressing through the death of a comrade, thoughts of home, and ending with a victorious return and the assertion that Britain will continue to 'rule the waves':

1. Bugle Calls
2. The Anchor's Weighed
3. The Saucy Arethusa
4. Tom Bowling
5. Jack's The Lad (Hornpipe)
6. Farewell and Adieu, Ye Spanish Ladies (with optional clarinet cadenza)
7. Home, Sweet Home
8. See, the Conqu'ring Hero Comes!
9. Rule, Britannia!

The opening series of six naval bugle calls and their responses are taken from the calls traditionally used to convey orders on a naval warship. The first call is Admiral's salute, followed by Action, General Assembly, Landing Party, Prepare to Ram and finally Quick, Double, Extend and Close. The optional clarinet cadenza in the 'Spanish Ladies' section was written specifically for Haydn Draper.

== Instrumentation ==
Wood scored the Fantasia for one piccolo, three flutes, three oboes, one English horn, three clarinets in B-Flat, two bassoons, one contrabassoon; six horns in F, four trumpets in B-Flat, three trombones, one bass trombone, two tubas (one doubling euphonium); a percussion section with timpani, tambourine, glockenspiel, side drum, tenor drum, bass drum, triangle and cymbals; organ; two harps and strings. Wood also included an offstage horn on the left, as well as four offstage trumpets and a side drum on the right.

== Last Night of the Proms ==
For many years, the Fantasia has been a staple item in the BBC's "Last Night of the Proms" concert, often with modifications. It was omitted from the programme, however, in 2008, 2010, 2011, 2013, 2014, and 2015. "Rule, Britannia!" has been given a place in the programme in its own right, and was still performed in the years in which the full Fantasia was omitted.

"Rule, Britannia!" was originally included in the Fantasia, but for many years up to 2000 it had been performed in an arrangement by Sir Malcolm Sargent, with a noted opera singer to encourage the audience to sing the refrain. From 2002 to 2007, the BBC reverted to the original arrangement that Sir Henry Wood made for the Fantasia, performing just one verse with chorus for audience participation. In 2009 the original arrangement by Thomas Arne was used, and the Sargent version was again heard in 2012.

In 2005, the bugle calls were restored to the Fantasia after a long absence. At the same time, with the development of related concerts running simultaneously in different parts of Britain, "Ye Spanish Ladies" was removed and replaced by the Welsh, Scottish and Irish songs, arranged by Bob Chilcott: "Ar Hyd y Nos", "The Skye Boat Song" and "Danny Boy", which have obscured Wood's original 'plot'.

Crowd participation is often noted in the Fantasia performance during the Last Night of the Proms. Mock tears were shed by the audience during "Tom Bowling", feet were stamped in time to the introduction of "Jack's the Lad", a familiar tune which gets faster and faster, being followed by the honking of hooters and a clapping crescendo during the climax. Occasionally the orchestra have been known to deliberately perform this part out of tune in response to the audience. The frantic pace was then juxtaposed with solemn humming in "Home, Sweet Home" and then the whistling of the melody of "See, the Conquering Hero Comes!" This culminated in the "prommers" singing the refrain of "Rule, Britannia!". During the various solos, the performing artists often ad libbed their own variation on the melody and various parts of the Fantasia were often repeated at the request of the audience, whose participation was usually encouraged by light-hearted mockery on the part of the conductor.
