= Pieter Melvill van Carnbee (naval officer) =

Dutch naval officer and politician

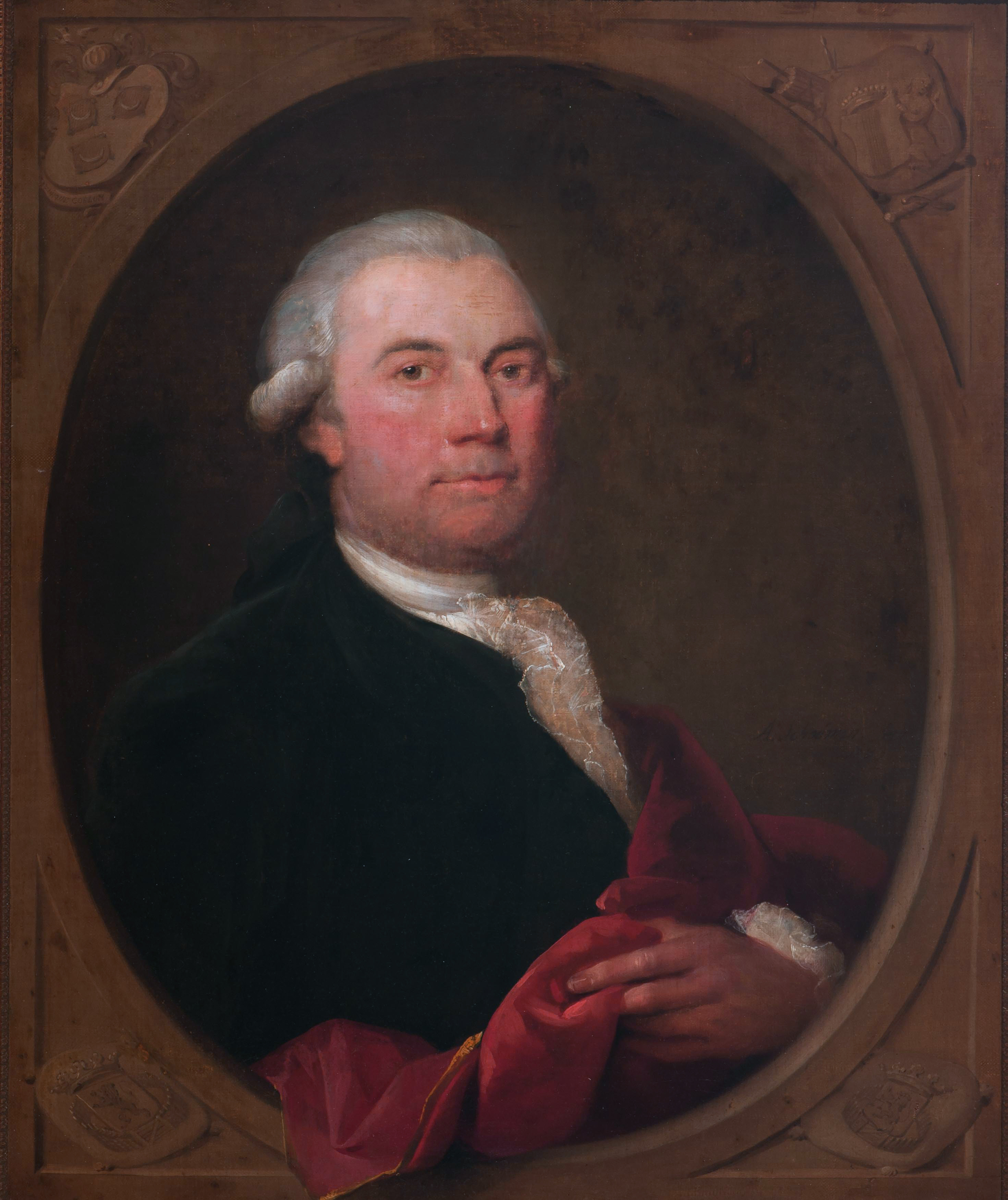
- Portrait by Aert Schouman, 1783
- Born: 2 April 1743; Dordrecht
- Died: 17 May 1826 (aged 83); The Hague
- Military career
- Allegiance: Dutch Republic; Kingdom of Holland; United Kingdom of the Netherlands
- Branch: Dutch States Navy; Navy of the Kingdom of Holland; Royal Netherlands Navy
- Service years: –1826
- Rank: Vice admiral
- Conflicts: Fourth Anglo-Dutch War; Action of 30 May 1781 (surrendered); French Revolutionary Wars; Flanders campaign; Napoleonic Wars

Vice-Admiral Pieter baron Melvill van Carnbee (2 April 1743 – 17 May 1826) was a Dutch naval officer and politician who served in the Fourth Anglo-Dutch War and French Revolutionary and Napoleonic Wars.

== Life ==
He is best known for his involvement in the action of 30 May 1781, where van Carnbee was taken prisoner by the British navy. In 1793 van Carnbee (by then a Schout-bij-nacht) was made commander of the squadron on the Meuse and the Hollands Diep. He oversaw the Dutch line of defence and the major rivers whilst French troops under Charles Pichegru were advancing. However, in winter 1795, the rivers froze over and Melvill's ships were trapped, meaning he could do nothing to prevent the French from conquering Holland, Utrecht and Zeeland. A supporter of the Prince of Orange, he left the Dutch navy on 24 February 1795 after the formation of the Batavian Republic.

Melvill was later released from his oath by William V, Prince of Orange and on 16 July 1806 King Louis Bonaparte made him Staatsraad in charge of the navy of the Kingdom of Holland, as well as a Commander of the Order of the Union. According to a letter in the Daendels family archive, Melvil was at that moment (on 17 February 1807) "aux Grandes Indes", that is in the Dutch East Indies. in 1809 he was made a Secretary of State. From 30 November 1811 to 1 January 1813 he was 'President of the Assembly of the 's-Gravenhage Canton' in the First French Empire.

In 1814 Melvill joined the Royal Netherlands Navy, which was established after the formation of the United Kingdom of the Netherlands. On 8 July 1815 William I of the Netherlands, in his decree number 16 on "past services", made Melvil a Commander of the Military William Order. In Melvil's case the "past services" being rewarded were loyalty to William I's father William V and the 1781 frigate action. He also served as a member of the Dutch Council of State. On 16 September 1815 he was raised to the Dutch peerage and on 6 May 1822 awarded the title of baron.

== Bibliography ==
- (in Dutch) J.C. de Jonge, Geschiedenis van het Nederlandsche zeewezen, part 6 (3rd edition, Zwolle 1869)
- (in Dutch) J.C. Mollema, Geschiedenis van Nederland ter zee, part 3 (Amsterdam, 1941
- (in Dutch) H.A. van Karnebeek, "Levensschets van den viceadmiraal A.W. de Man", 's-Gravenhage 1861
- (in Dutch) Luc Eckhout, "Het admiralenboek", Amsterdam 1992
- (in Dutch) O. Schutte, "De Orde van de Unie", Zutphen 1985

== Sources ==
- (in Dutch)The 1781 battle

Dutch nobility
New title	Baron Melvill van Carnbee; 1822–1826	Succeeded by James John Melvill van Carnbee
