= USS Cabot (1775) =

American warship

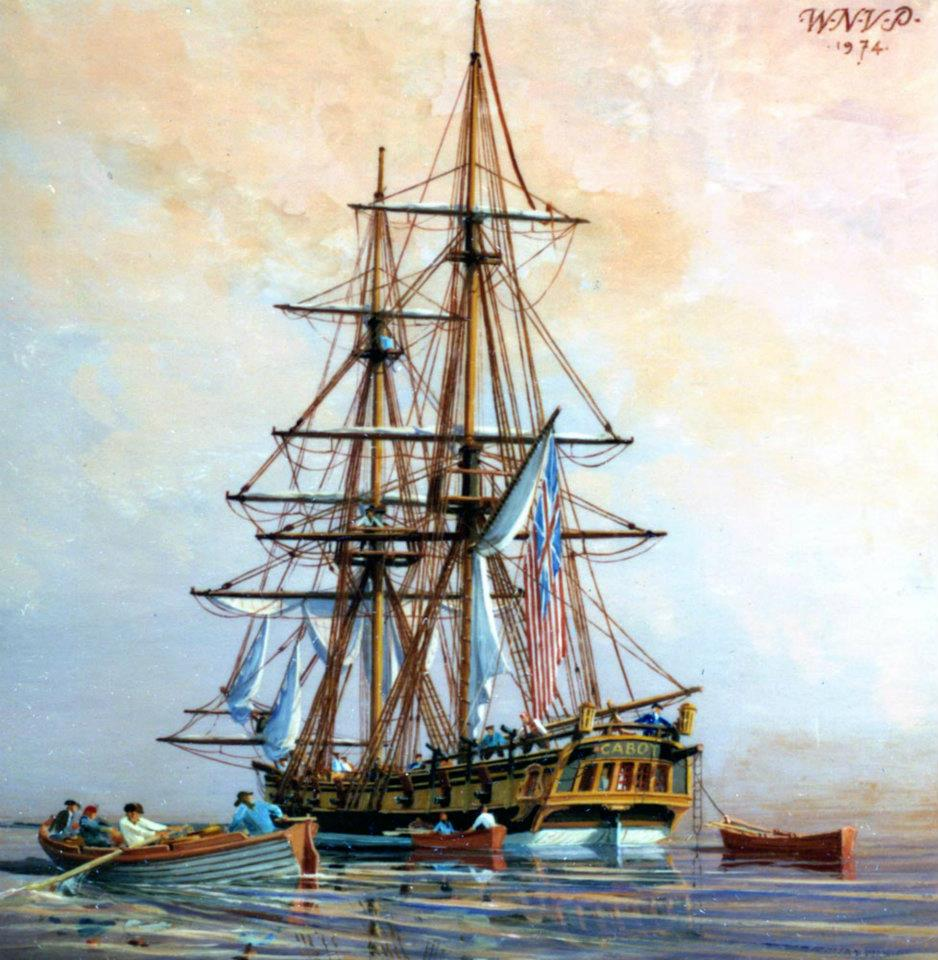
- 1974 painting of Cabot by William Nowland Van Powell

History

United States
- Name: USS Cabot
- Namesake: John Cabot
- Acquired: November 1775
- Fate: Captured, 28 March 1777

General characteristics
- Type: Brig
- Tons burthen: 189
- Length: 74 ft 8 in (22.76 m)
- Beam: 24 ft 7 in (7.49 m)
- Depth: 11 ft 3 in (3.43 m)
- Complement: 120 officers and men
- Armament: 14 × 6-pounder (2.7 kg) guns

Service record
- Operations: Battle of Nassau

USS Cabot was a 14-gun brig of the Continental Navy. She was the first American warships to be captured in the American Revolutionary War. On 13 October 1775, acting on intelligence received concerning the dispatch of supply vessels from Britain, the Continental Congress authorized the acquisition of two ships and the appointment of a three-man Naval Committee to oversee their acquisition and fitting out. At that time, one vessel was specified as being of 10 guns while the other was not of a specified size.

On 30 October 1775, the issue was again revisited by Congress and the second vessel was specified as being of 14 guns while two more, larger vessels were authorized. Even though the first vessel was specified as 10 guns, the footnotes in for the entry on the 30th from the compilation known as "Naval Documents of the American Revolution" specifies the first authorization as being the Cabot while the second is the Andrew Doria (1775 brig). The newly authorized ships are identified as the USS Columbus and the USS Alfred.

Cabot was purchased in Philadelphia in November 1775, outfitted there by Wharton and Humphreys and placed under the command of Captain J. B. Hopkins. Sailing with Commodore Esek Hopkins' fleet, Cabot joined in the raid of Nassau in March 1776, taking part in the brief capture of New Providence on 3 March. Upon the return of the fleet, Cabot was first to fire in the Battle of Block Island on 6 April. In the next month she made a short cruise off New England, during which she took her first prize. In September and October, again sailing in New England waters, she took six more prizes.

Under the command of Captain Joseph Olney, Cabot stood out of Boston weeks before on 28 March 1777 the vessel (140 men) encountered HMS Milford (28), under the command of Captain John Burr, in the Battle off Yarmouth. The vastly more powerful British ship chased Cabot and forced her ashore near the mouth of the Chebogue, Nova Scotia. While Cabot's captain and crew escaped into the woods unharmed, the British were later able to get the brig off, and refitted her for service in the Royal Navy.
