= HMS Arethusa (1759) =

Frigate of the Royal Navy

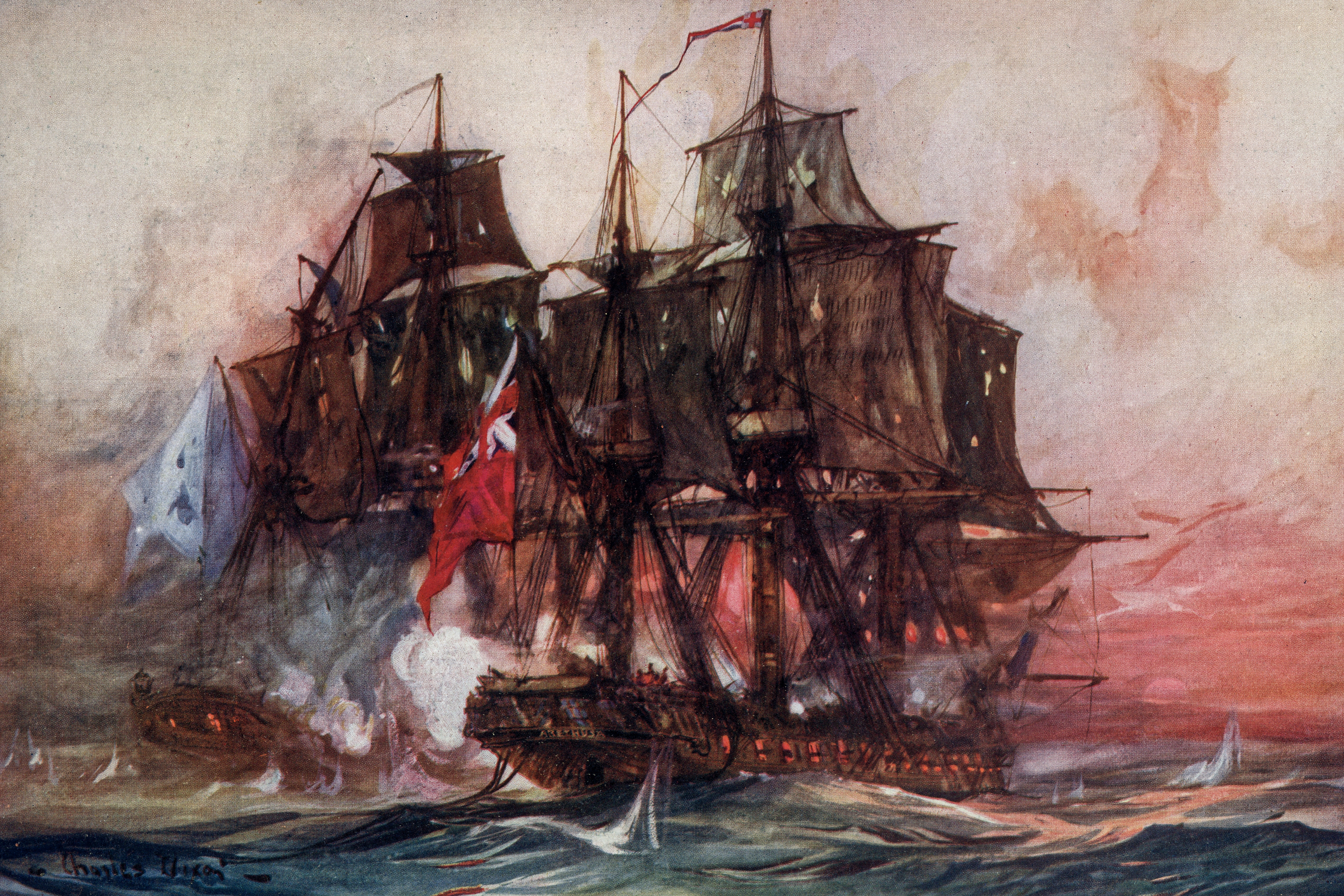
- Arethusa (right) at the action of 17 June 1778

History

Kingdom of France
- Name: Aréthuse
- Namesake: Arethusa
- Builder: Le Havre
- Launched: December 1757
- Commissioned: 1757
- Captured: by the Royal Navy, 18 May 1759

Great Britain
- Name: HMS Arethusa
- Fate: Wrecked, 19 March 1779.

General characteristics
- Type: Fifth-rate frigate
- Displacement: 900 tonneaux
- Tons burthen: 540 port tonneaux
- Length: 132 ft (40 m)
- Beam: 34 ft (10 m)
- Propulsion: Sails
- Complement: 270
- Armament: Pierced for 36 guns, 32 mounted (1759)

Aréthuse was a French frigate, launched in 1757 during the Seven Years' War. She was captured by the Royal Navy in 1759 and became the fifth-rate HMS Arethusa. She remained in Royal Navy service for twenty years until she was wrecked after being badly damaged in battle.

== French service ==
The ship was constructed at Le Havre for privateer warfare as Pélerine. Soon after her launch, she was purchased by the King and commissioned as Aréthuse on 21 January 1758.

In April, under Captain Jean Vauquelin, she departed from Brest with the ships Echo and Bizarre (sailing En flûte) for the French Fortress of Louisbourg in Nova Scotia, then being besieged by the British.

Vauquelin and his ship played a significant role in defending the fortress by bombarding the positions of the besieging British troops, slowing their advance. On the foggy night of the 15 July Aréthuse departed from Louisbourg to return to France with dispatches. She was damaged by fire from British shore batteries, but was able to evade the blockading squadron of British ships. Louisbourg surrendered 11 days later.

On 18 May 1759, Aréthuse was in transit from Rochefort to Brest, under the command of Louis-Philippe de Rigaud, Marquis de Vaudreuil, when she was intercepted near Audierne Bay (Baie d'Audierne) by three Royal Navy ships – the fourth-rate ship-of-the-line Chatham, commanded by John Lockhart-Ross and the frigates Thames and Venus. She attempted to escape but after two hours she lost her topmasts and was overtaken by her pursuers. She was fired on by Thames but only surrendered after suffering several broadsides from Venus that killed or wounded 60 crew. During the action four men on Thames were killed and 11 wounded, of whom three later died. Five men were wounded on Venus.

== Royal Navy service ==
She entered service with the Royal Navy. For the rest of the war, she was in service in British home waters and was responsible for the capture of several French privateer cutters.

Arethusa arrived at Boston with nearly a full complement May 26, 1772 though having lost her main and mizzen masts in a hard gale at the back of the Nantucket Shoals following orders to remain at Virginia by Rear Admiral John Montagu, reported May 9, 1772 after learning she was unable to reach Boston because thirty two men had deserted. Before sailing for Spithead in October 1773, Captain Hamond was ordered to spare four six pounder cannon with carrages to HMS Kingfisher replacing those lost in a gale as none were in store at Halifax

In 1777, a Scotsman James Aitken, widely known as John the Painter, was hanged from her mizzenmast for burning the Rope House at Portsmouth Royal Dockyard on 7 December 1776, to aid the cause of American independence . The mast was struck from the ship and re-erected at the dockyard entrance so as many people as possible could watch the execution. This was the only execution for arson in royal dockyards.

On 17 June 1778, she fought a famous duel against the French 36-gun frigate, Belle Poule. Belle Poule was on a reconnaissance mission, along with the 26-gun Licorne, the corvette Hirondelle and the smaller Coureur when she encountered a large British squadron that included Arethusa at a point 23 miles (37 km) south of The Lizard. Admiral Keppel, commanding the British fleet ordered that the French ships be pursued.

The captain of Belle Poule refused the order to sail back to the British fleet. The British fired a warning shot across his ship's bow, to which he responded with a full broadside. This began a furious, two-hour battle between the two ships that resulted in the deaths of the French second captain and 30 of the crew. However, Arethusa was crippled by the loss of a mast and withdrew, allowing Belle Poule to escape.

This battle was the first between British and French naval forces during the American Revolutionary War and took place around three weeks before the formal declaration of war by France.

The battle was widely celebrated in France as a victory, even inspiring a hair-style in court circles that included a model of Belle Poule. It was also viewed as a victory in Britain and became the subject of a traditional Sea shanty, The Saucy Arethusa (Roud # 12675). Arethusa is also the subject of a song on the Decemberists' album Her Majesty the Decemberists.

Location of the sinking

On 18 March 1779, Arethusa engaged the French Aigrette, under Lieutenant Mortemart, sustaining considerable damage in the fight. Arethusa was wrecked the next day off Ushant, at a point 48°27′4″N 5°4′4″W.

== See also ==
- List of ships captured in the 18th century
- The Saucy Arethusa
