= HMS Milford (1759) =

Coventry-class Royal Navy frigate

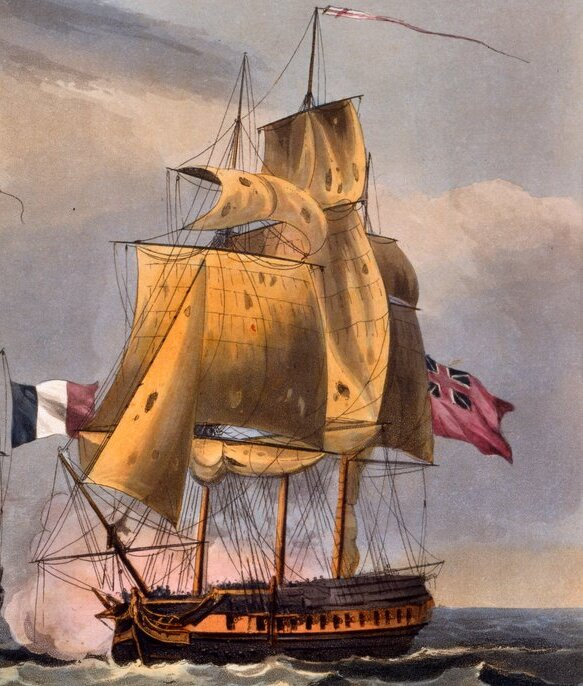
- Milford was built to the same design as HMS Carysfort, (pictured)

History

Great Britain
- Name: HMS Milford
- Namesake: Milford Haven, Wales
- Ordered: 19 September 1757
- Builder: Richard Chitty, Milford
- Laid down: November 1757
- Launched: 20 September 1759
- Completed: 28 December 1759
- Commissioned: July 1759
- Fate: Sold to be taken to pieces at Woolwich 17 May 1785

General characteristics
- Class & type: 28-gun Coventry-class sixth-rate frigate
- Tons burthen: 588 72/94 bm
- Length: 118 ft 3 in (36.0 m) (gundeck); 97 ft 5 in (29.7 m) (keel)
- Beam: 33 ft 9 in (10.3 m)
- Depth of hold: 10 ft 6 in (3.20 m)
- Sail plan: Full-rigged ship
- Complement: 200 officers and men
- Armament: Upperdeck: 24 × 9-pounder guns; QD: 4 × 3-pounder guns; Also: 12 × ½-pdr swivel guns

HMS Milford was a 28-gun Coventry-class sixth-rate frigate of the Royal Navy. She was built at Milford by Richard Chitty and launched in 1759. She was sold for breaking on 17 May 1785 after an impressive 25-year service.

== Construction ==
Plan of Milford

In sailing qualities, Milford was broadly comparable with French frigates of equivalent size, but with a shorter and sturdier hull and greater weight in her broadside guns. She was also comparatively broad-beamed with ample space for provisions and the ship's mess, and incorporated a large magazine for powder and round shot. (Note: Milford's dimensional ratios 3.57:1 in length to breadth, and 3.3:1 in breadth to depth, compare with standard French equivalents of up to 3.8:1 and 3:1 respectively. Royal Navy vessels of equivalent size and design to Milford were capable of carrying up to 20 tons of powder and shot, compared with a standard French capacity of around 10 tons. They also carried greater stores of rigging, spars, sails and cables, but had fewer ship's boats and less space for the possessions of the crew.) Taken together, these characteristics would enable Milford to remain at sea for long periods without resupply. She was also built with broad and heavy masts, which balanced the weight of her hull, improved stability in rough weather, and made her capable of carrying a greater quantity of sail. The disadvantages of this comparatively heavy design were a decline in manoeuvrability and slower speed when sailing in light winds.

Her designated complement was 200, comprising two commissioned officers – a captain and a lieutenant – overseeing 40 warrant and petty officers, 91 naval ratings, 38 Marines and 29 servants and other ranks. (Note: The 29 servants and other ranks provided for in the ship's complement consisted of 20 personal servants and clerical staff, four assistant carpenters an assistant sailmaker and four widow's men. Unlike naval ratings, servants and other ranks took no part in the sailing or handling of the ship.) Among these other ranks were four positions reserved for widow's men – fictitious crew members whose pay was intended to be reallocated to the families of sailors who died at sea.

== Service history ==
Following Spain's declaration of war, joining the French against Great Britain in the Seven Years' War, Milford fell in with an aviso carrying orders from Spain to its forces in Havana. The ships met off Cape Tiburon, the westernmost point of St Domingo, and after fighting all day, the aviso was forced to strike. The aviso's commander sank his despatches, and the only document received in Havana was a copy of the Madrid Gazette containing the Spanish declaration of war.

Milford's Captain John Burr arrived in Nantasket Road, Boston in March 1776 from England to join the North America station, bringing orders for its C-in-C Vice Admiral Molyneaux Shuldham.

On 6 June 1776, Milford captured the American privateer Yankee Hero, a 14-gun, single-deck sloop, after a two-hour battle. The Americans believed they were chasing a merchantman, but reversed course when they came close enough to recognize the British ship of war. Milford gave chase and caught up to the much smaller ship after about an hour, firing only bow chasers until she was able to come along and give a full broadside. Yankee Hero's sails were shredded and almost half her crew were incapacitated. Her commander, Captain James Tracy, ordered the surrender when they were no longer able to either fight or flee. Four or five of Yankee Hero's crew were killed, and twelve or thirteen were wounded, including Tracy.

Milford stands out as the British vessel that engaged the first American armed vessel, USS Cabot. In the Battle of Yarmouth, under the command of Captain Joseph Olney, Cabot stood out of Boston on 23 March 1777, weeks before the vessel encountered Milford. The vastly more powerful British ship chased Cabot and forced her ashore in Nova Scotia. While Cabot's captain and crew escaped into the woods unharmed, the British were later able to get the brig off, and refitted her for service in the Royal Navy. She captured many vessels throughout that year, including:

- "Little John" – 14 June, in the Bay of Fundy
- "Revenge" – May
- "Expidition" – 14 July
- "Elizabeth" – 3 August
- "Topinambou" – 1 September, off Isle Holt
- "Dolphin" – 4 October, off the coast of Nova Scotia. "Dolphin" was a Massachusetts privateer schooner
- "Industry" – 4 December
- "Betsy" – 5 December, in Boston Bay.

In December 1777, she was driven ashore in a gale at Halifax, Nova Scotia. She was refloated 3 days later, and while her hull was in good shape, her upper works were badly damaged, and she was sent back to the U.K. for repairs, leaving by mid-January. On 3 February 1778, she captured "Gruel", a Massachusetts State Govt. trading vessel 208 leagues from Halifax. On 15 March 1779, the British warships Apollo, Porcupine, and Milford captured the French privateer cutter Tapageur. The Royal Navy took her into service under her existing name.

On 2 October 1779, Jupiter captured two French cutters, Mutin and Pilote, each containing 14 guns and 120 men. The Royal Navy took both into service essentially under their existing names. Jupiter shared the prize money with Apollo, Crescent, and Milford.

Six years later in 1785, Milford was sold at Woolwich Dockyard.
