= HMS Crescent (1779) =

Enterprise-class frigate of the Royal Navy

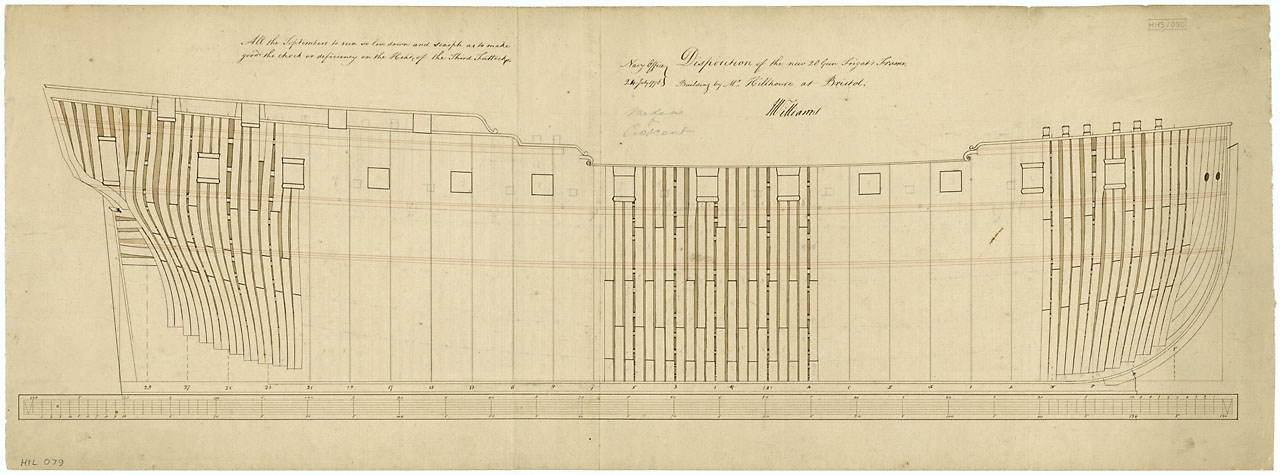
- Ship plan of Crescent

History

Great Britain
- Name: HMS Crescent
- Ordered: 19 July 1777
- Builder: James Martin Hillhouse, Bristol
- Laid down: 19 August 1777
- Launched: March 1779
- Completed: 30 June 1779 (at Plymouth Dockyard)
- Commissioned: September 1779
- Fate: Captured by a French frigate 20 June 1781

France
- Name: Crescent
- Acquired: 1781 by capture
- Fate: Wrecked, January 1786

General characteristics
- Class & type: 28-gun Enterprise-class sixth-rate frigate
- Displacement: 850 tons (French)
- Tons burthen: 61129/94 (bm)
- Length: 120 ft 8 in (36.78 m) (overall); 99 ft 5 in (30.30 m) (keel)
- Beam: 34 ft 0 in (10.4 m)
- Depth of hold: 11 ft (3.4 m)
- Sail plan: Full-rigged ship
- Complement: British service: 200 officers and men; French service: 130 (peace & 210 (war)
- Armament: British service; Upper deck: 24 × 9-pounder guns; QD: 4 × 6-pounder guns + 4 × 18-pounder carronades; Fc: 2 × 18-pounder carronades; Also:12 × swivel guns; French service; Upper deck: 24 × 9-pounder guns; Spar deck: 4 × 3-pounder guns; after 1784 2 × 6-pounder guns (French)

HMS Crescent was a 28-gun Enterprise-class sixth-rate frigate of the Royal Navy. Crescent was launched in 1779. The French captured her in 1781. She was wrecked in 1786.

== British service ==
Crescent was commissioned in c. September 1779 under the command of Captain Charles Hope. On 2 October 1779, Jupiter captured two French cutters, Mutin and Pilote, each of 14 guns and 120 men. The Royal Navy took both into service essentially under their existing names. Jupiter shared the prize money with Apollo, Crescent, and Milford. On 16 March 1781, Crescent, under the command of Captain Thomas Packenham, was one of over 40 warships in a fleet under the command of Admiral John Darby, in Britannia, that left Portsmouth that day for Gibraltar. One day later, there arrived at Falmouth a French privateer and a brig, her prize, that Crescent had sent in. A prize money notice from 31 December 1781 reported that the vessels in Darby's fleet would share in the prize money for Duc de Chartres, brig Trois Amis, and the Spanish frigate Leocadia, which the fleet had captured on its way to Gibraltar. (Note: The Royal Navy took the privateer into service as HMS Duc du Chartres.) (Note: Actually, Darby detached Canada and she captured the Spanish frigate Leocadia in the action of 1 May 1781, off Brest. The Royal Navy took her into service as HMS Leocadia.)

Less than a month after she had left Portsmouth, on 12 April 1781 Crescent and Flora, Captain William Peere Williams, left Gibraltar as escorts to 13 vessels sailing to Minorca. They arrived at "Mahone" on 19 April. On 3 May Flora, and Crescent left Port Mahon, intending to pass the Gut of Gibraltar as quickly as possible.

On the morning of 23 May they saw eight Spanish vessels, a 74-gun ship, four xebecs, an armed ship, and two bomb vessels. The Spanish commodore set his squadron in chase, before sending all but his vessel and two xebecs, each of 36 guns, back to Spain. One of the xebecs caught up with Crescent and a three-hour running fight ensued during which Crescent sustained no casualties. Flora came up and fired some broadsides at the xebec, which fell back to repair damage. Flora had one man killed and one wounded due to poor gun-handling. The Spaniards resumed their chase in the evening but Flora and Crescent were able to elude them in the night. The engagement had driven the British vessels close to Cape Palos so they cruised there for two days in case to ensure that the enemy were not in the vicinity. They then sailed for the North African coast and were off Gibraltar on 29 May.

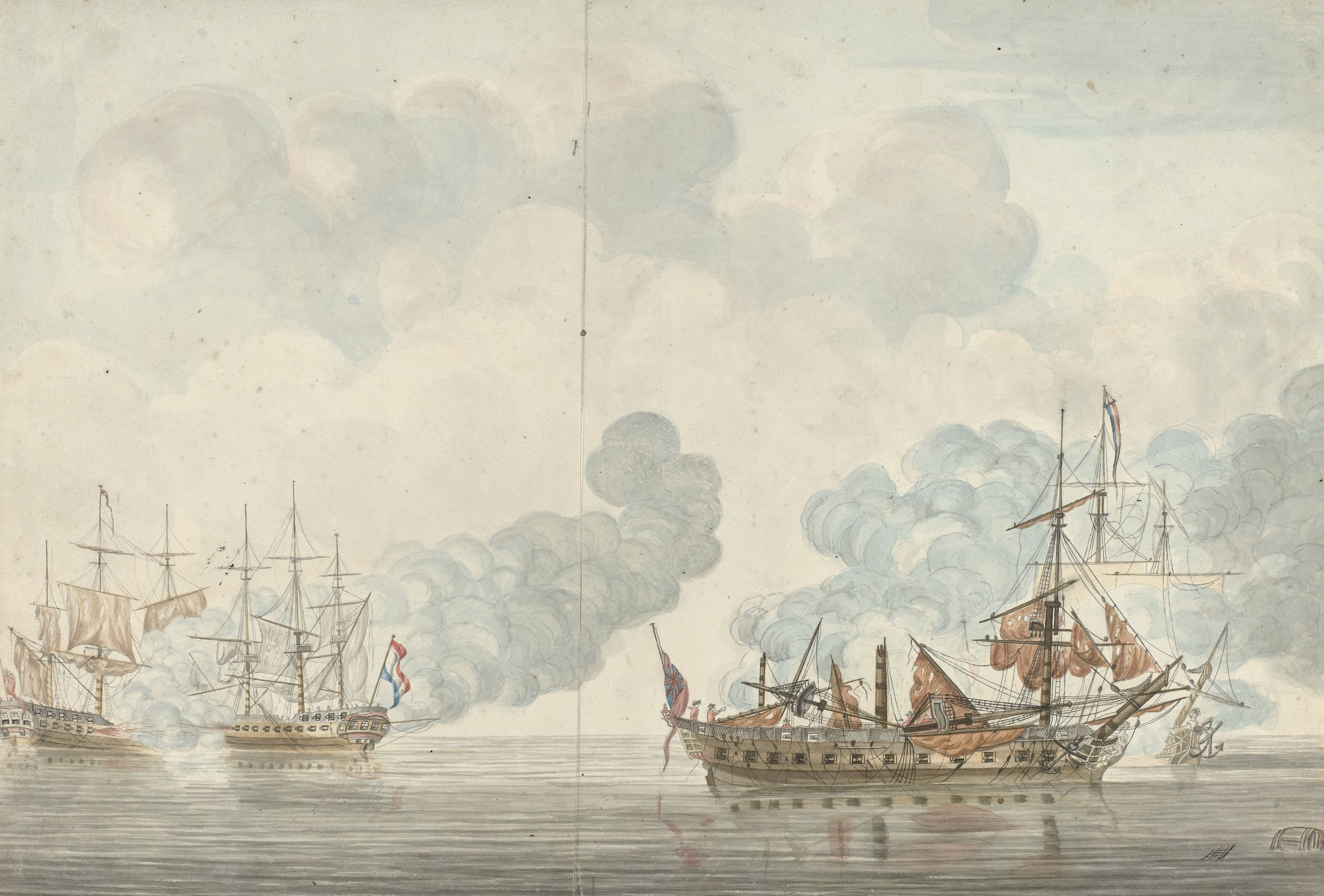
Crescent (second from right) at the action of 30 May 1781

The next morning they advised General Elliot of the presence of the Spanish squadron, and then sailed towards Ceuta. They sighted two large Dutch frigates, but were unable to bring them to action until the next morning. At daybreak on 30 May Flora engaged one of the Dutch frigates, and Crescent the other. After two and a quarter hours, the Dutch frigate struck to Flora. The Dutch frigate was the Castor, of twenty-six 12-pounder guns and ten 6-pounders, and a crew of 230 men under the command of Captain Pieter Melvill. The action between Crescent and the Dutch frigate Brill continued a little longer. She was the same rate as Castor, mounting twenty-six 12-pounder guns, two 6-pounder guns, and four 4-pounder guns. A shot from Brill brought down Crescent's main and mizzen masts on to her decks, rendering her guns inoperable and the ship unmanageable. Packenham was forced to strike his colours.

Flora came up and recaptured Crescent before Brill could take possession. Brill then left. Captain Williams was unable to pursue as both Castor and Crescent were badly holed and taking on water, forcing their crews to man the pumps. At this point Packenham asked Williams to appoint one of his officers to command Crescent pending Packenham's court-martial for his surrendering his ship. Williams sent over his First Lieutenant, John Bligh, while retaining the rest of Crescent's existing officers. The battle had been sanguinary. Flora had nine men killed and 32 wounded, of whom eight died subsequently and at least one more was not expected to live. Crescent had 26 men killed and 67 wounded, some of whom died later. Lastly, Castor had lost 22 men killed and 41 wounded, 11 of whom subsequently died.

The three vessels then spent five days effecting repairs, before setting out again. On 19 June Flora was chasing a privateer brig that had been dogging the British ships when Flora sighted two larger vessels approaching. Flora then rejoined her consorts, hoping that the sight of three warships would ward off the approaching vessels. However, the two vessels, seeing the bedraggled state of Crescent and Castor, continued their approach. Each of the three British ships then set off on a different course. Flora observed one of the frigates hoist French colours as she captured Castor. The other set off after Crescent. Casualties, and the necessity of putting 38 men from Flora and a like number from Crescent on Castor to man the pumps and serve as a prize crew had left all three too weak to sustain combat.

== Capture ==
The French captured Crescent on 20 June 1781 off Ushant. At 4am Gloire and Friponne caught up with Crescent and after an exchange of fire, Crescent struck.

== Fate ==
The French took Crescent into service. She was wrecked on the reefs off Petit-Goâve, San Domingo, in January 1786.
