= French frigate Belle Poule (1766) =

French and British naval ship until 1798

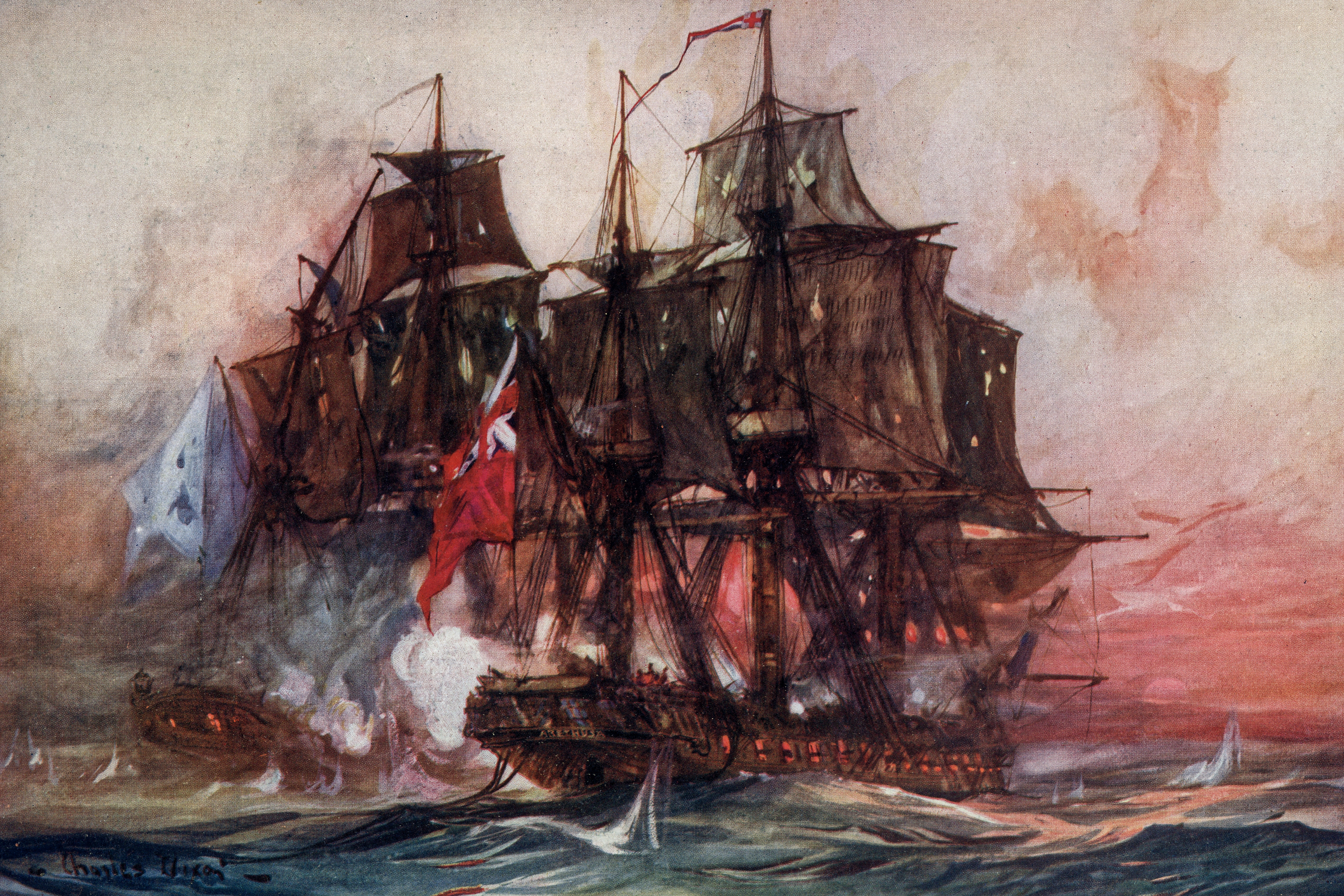
- Belle Poule (left) at the action of 17 June 1778

History

France
- Name: Belle Poule
- Builder: Bordeaux shipyard
- Laid down: March 1765
- Launched: 18 November 1766
- Commissioned: Early 1767
- Captured: 16 July 1780 by the Royal Navy
- Notes: Participated in: Battle of Dogger Bank

Great Britain
- Name: Belle Poule
- Acquired: 16 July 1780
- Commissioned: February 1781
- Out of service: 1798
- Fate: Broken up in 1801

General characteristics
- Class & type: Dédaigneuse-class frigate
- Displacement: 1150 tonneaux
- Tons burthen: 620 port tonneaux
- Length: 43 m (141 ft)
- Beam: 11.2 m (37 ft)
- Draught: 4.9 m (16 ft)
- Sail plan: Full-rigged ship
- Complement: 8 officers + 260 men
- Armament: 26 × 12-pounder; 4 × 6-pounder guns

Belle Poule was a French frigate of the Dédaigneuse class, designed by Léon-Michel Guignace. She is most famous for her duel with the British frigate HMS Arethusa on 17 June 1778, which began the French involvement in the American War of Independence.

== 1768 – 1777 ==
Belle Poule was built in Bordeaux between March 1765 and early 1767. She served in two campaigns in the West Indies, where due to her good sailing performance she was selected for the first French attempt at covering her hull with copper to resist marine growths.

From 1772 to 1776, she was sent on hydrographic missions, during which the young La Pérouse came to the attention of his superiors.

On 12 December 1776, she left India to return to Brest. At the time, France was not yet engaged in the American War of Independence, but there had been numerous incidents involving French and British ships. Indeed, on 27 April 1777, Belle Poule was chased by a British ship of the line, which she easily evaded to reach Brest. In December 1777, Belle Poule was selected to ferry Silas Deane back to America, along with news of the French-American Alliance.

== 1778 – 1801 ==
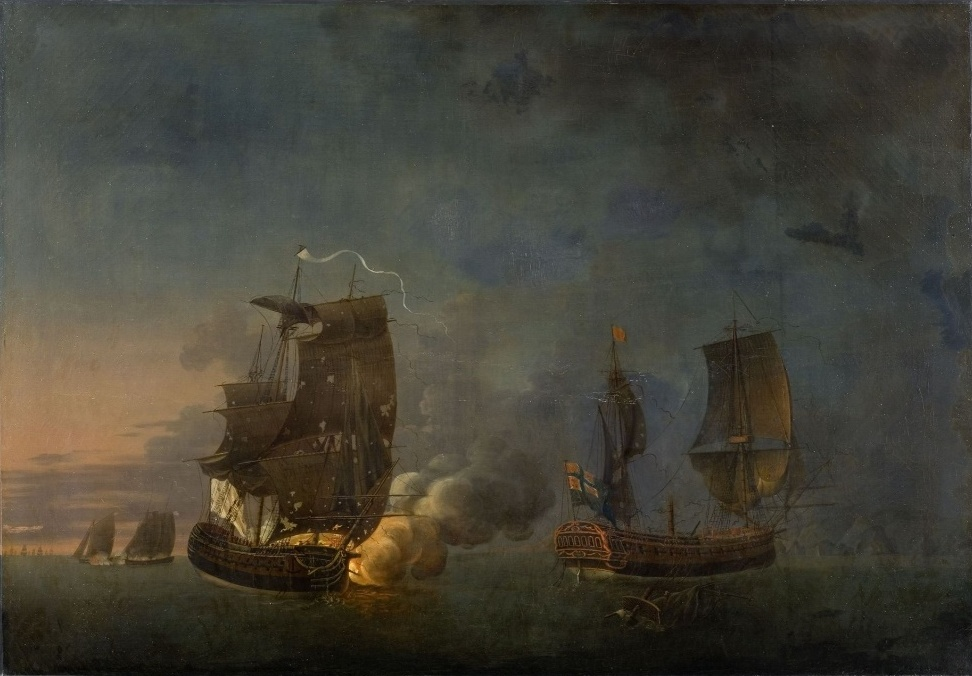
Painting by Auguste-Louis de Rossel de Cercy depicting the fight of Belle Poule and Arethusa

On 7 January, the British ships of the line Hector and Courageux stopped her and demanded to inspect her. In spite of the overwhelming superiority of the two ships, her captain, Charles de Bernard de Marigny, answered:

I am the Belle Poule, frigate of the King of France; I sail from sea and I sail to sea. Vessels of the King, my master, never allow inspections.

The British offered apologies and let the frigate sail through. However, opposing winds prevented the ship from crossing the Atlantic, and after 36 days, Belle Poule had to return to Brest. Franklin later sailed to America aboard Sensible.

=== Fight of Belle Poule and Arethusa ===
When war broke out, Belle Poule was sent on a reconnaissance mission, along with the 26-gun frigate Licorne, the corvette Hirondelle, and the smaller Coureur, to locate the squadron of Admiral Keppel. They encountered the British squadron, which chased them.

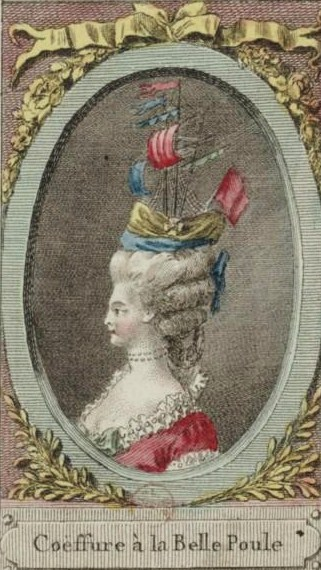
Coiffure Belle-Poule

Arethusa caught up with the French and a furious battle ensued. Eventually, Arethusa had to break off the fight, having lost her main mast. The British captured the smaller French ships, but the two frigates escaped the numerous ships of the line pursuing them. Belle Poule lost 30 killed and 72 wounded, among which her captain, Lieutenant Jean Isaac Chadeau de la Clocheterie. Arethusa had eight men killed and 36 wounded. The battle was so famous that ladies of the high society invented the hairstyle "Belle Poule", with a ship on the top of the head.

Between September and October 1778, Belle Poule teamed up with French ship Vengeur and captured five privateers. In 1779, Belle Poule served as coast guard and convoy escort.

== Capture ==
On the evening of 14 July 1780 Captain Sir James Wallace of the 64-gun ship of the line Nonsuch was off the Loire where her boats were burning the French frigate Legere. He observed three vessels to the north west, signalling each other, and immediately gave chase. At about midnight Nonsuch caught up with one of the three off Île d'Yeu and commenced a two-hour action. When the French vessel struck her colours was identified as Belle Poule. She was armed with 32 12-pounder guns, had a crew of 275 men and was under the command of Raymond-Marie, chevalier de Kergariou-Coatlès. In the engagement Belle Poule lost 25 men killed, including Kergariou, and 50 other officers and men, including her second captain, wounded. Nonsuch had lost three men killed and 10 wounded, two of whom died later. The two French vessels that escaped were the frigate Aimable, of 32 8-pounder guns, and the corvette Rossignol, of 20 6-pounder guns.

== British service ==
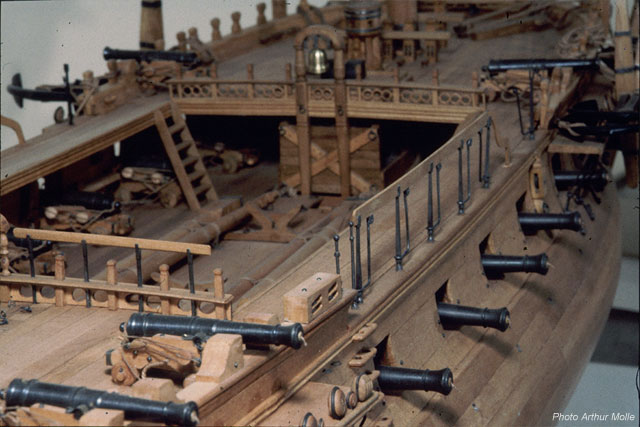
Model by Arthur Molle

She was commissioned in February 1781 into the British Royal Navy, retaining her name. She served for the next 21 months under Captain Philip Patton with William Bligh as the ship's Master. On 17 April she, with Berwick, captured the privateer Calonne, under the command of Luke Ryan. Calonne was only two years old, a fast sailer, and well equipped for a voyage of three months and a crew of 200 men. She was armed with twenty-two 9-pounder guns, six 4-pounder guns and six 12-pounder carronades.

Belle Poule participated in the Battle of Dogger Bank (1781). Hollandia, one of the Dutch ships-of-the-line, sank after the battle. Belle Poule took away her flag, which was kept flying, and carried it to Admiral Parker.

== Fate ==
The Royal Navy put Belle Poule into ordinary at Chatham in November 1782. She then served briefly as a receiving ship from 1796 before the British Admiralty sold her for breaking up in 1801.
