= American colonial marines =

Early Marine force of the American revolutionary forces

American colonial marines were various naval infantry units which served during the Revolutionary War on the Patriot side. After the conflict broke out in 1775, eleven of the rebelling Thirteen Colonies established state navies to carry out naval operations. Accordingly, several marine units were raised to serve as an infantry component aboard the ships of these navies. The marines, along with the navies they served in, were intended initially as a stopgap measure to provide the Patriots with naval capabilities before the Continental Navy reached a significant level of strength. After its establishment, state navies, and the marines serving in them, participated in several operations alongside the Continental Navy and its marines.

== Arnold's flotilla ==
On 9 May 1775, sailors and mariner-militiamen aboard a flotilla under the command of Colonel Benedict Arnold captured civilian schooner Katherine on Lake Champlain. The ship was renamed Liberty to honor the patriot cause. Two days later on 11 May, Liberty collaborated in the capture of Fort Ticonderoga from the British. Then on 18 May, Benedict's forces captured the supply sloop George, and renamed it Enterprise. The new ship was reinforced with 18 Massachusetts militiamen, serving as marines; the first known officer listed on the payroll was Lieutenant James Watson.

The first recorded narrative of American marines were described during when the Connecticut Committee Public Safety sent £500 to Colonel Arnold in late-May, the shipment was escorted by eight colonial Marines; although they were actually seamen. They are often referred to as the "Original Eight." From 11 to 13 October 1776, the colonial Marines attached to Arnold's fleet participated in the Battle of Valcour Island. Although defeated, they delayed a British invasion until the following year.

== Washington's fleet ==
The Second Continental Congress passed a resolution on 10 June 1775, in creating the Continental Army from all the available colonial forces and militias around Boston; they appointed George Washington, a Congressman of Virginia, as the General and Commander-in-Chief of the Continental Army. It was vital for General Washington's army to seize Boston to help interdict the flow of supplies and reinforcement of troops to the British. Under-equipped and lacking gunpowder and supplies, Washington greatly depended in supplying his force from the surrounding colonial armies and navies, and from any cache that came from captured British ships of provision and matériel values.

By mid-August 1775, General Washington formed his own "maritime fleet" due to the limitations of funding and resources from the Continental Congress. On 24 August, he brought a schooner into service, Hannah, to interdict any British ships in the Massachusetts Bay. Hannah became the first American-built ship in the fleet, also becoming the founding vessel of the United States Navy. Following, Washington relied on the 14th Continental Regiment, or "Marblehead Regiment", consisting of a militia of skilled mariners throughout New England, in providing him a naval assault force for the upcoming siege in the Lake Champlain area. Other ships manned by this regiment included the schooners Harrison, Franklin, Hancock, Lee, and Warren.

Captain Nicholas Broughton sailed Hannah off the coast of Massachusetts on 7 September and captured the British sloop HMS Unity. On 10 October, the sailors and Marines of the Marblehead Regiment participated in the battle between Hannah and the British sloop HMS Nautilus in the harbor of Beverly, Massachusetts. Hannah was grounded by her captain in order to remove her powder and armaments, preventing their capture by the British. By 5 November 1775, Washington's regiment of Marines aboard Harrison participated in the capture of the British supply vessels Polly and Industry off the coast of Boston, Massachusetts. Two days later, on 7 November, Lee captured the British sloop HMS Ranger in the Massachusetts Bay.

Washington's Marblehead Regiment aboard Hancock and Franklin made an unopposed landing at Charlottetown, Prince Edward Island, on 17 November 1775. Three days later, they raided Canso Harbor, Nova Scotia. The Harrison and her Marine detachment fought against three British warships in Boston Harbor on 24 November 1775. On 27 November 1775, Lee and her Marine detachment captured a sloop off the New England coast. Over the next several weeks, these Marines participated in the capture of several British ships off the coast of New England.

Two British frigates captured the American warship Washington on 3 December, taking the sailors and Marines amongst her crew prisoner. A company of Washington's Fleet (along with his "Marblehead" Regiment) aboard Franklin, commanded by Captain James Mugford (of Commodore John Manly's Continental Navy squadron), captured the British transport ship Hope on 17 May 1775. The ship was stocked with 1,000 carbines and 75 tons of gunpowder. On June 16, Washington's fleet captured two British troopships attempting to reinforce Boston, which the British Army had evacuated prior their arrival. In the Atlantic on 7 June, the frigates Hancock and Boston, along with their Marine detachments, captured the British frigate HMS Fox.

== State navies ==
During the Revolutionary War, eleven out of thirteen colonies that had institutionalized a state navy also designated a crew of Marines. The state Marines served mainly on coastal defense vessels, and were mostly recruited from state militias.

=== Connecticut ===
In July 1775, the Marines in the sloop Spy, from the Connecticut State Navy, participated in the capture of the 250-ton British brig Nancy. In October, the Connecticut Marines aboard Spy assisted in the capture of another British ship. The Connecticut Navy ship Defence and her Marines captured the British ship Grog. On 15 April 1778, Marines participated in the actions in which Connecticut's Navy ships Oliver Cromwell and Defense captured the British privateers Admiral Keppel and Cyrus.

=== Georgia ===
Georgia State Navy galleys carried marines, troops and supplies for the two unsuccessful invasions of East Florida in 1777 and 1778. During these invasions the' marines also secured river crossings, escorted vessels transporting troops, and protected the army's flank. The Georgia State Navy's greatest success was the Frederica naval action on 19 April 1778. Washington, Lee, Bulloch, and other some boats, with marines on board, captured the 12-gun sloop HMS Hinchinbrook and the Loyalist privateer Rebeccas off St. Simons Island. Four galleys with marines served during the 1779 Siege of Savannah.

=== Massachusetts ===
In July 1779, the Massachusetts Marines (of the Massachusetts Naval Militia) and the Continental Marines—under the command of Continental Navy Captain Dudley Saltonstall—participated in an expedition to Penobscot Bay to besiege the British army forces, fortifications, and their warships. On 26 July, the landing force assaulted Nautilus Island (Banks Island) against a British stronghold of cannons, an artillery battery. Outnumbered, the battery's soldiers surrendered. Two days later, the American sailors and Marines alike engaged in their failed effort against the British positions on Bagaduce Peninsula.

=== Pennsylvania ===
The Pennsylvania Committee of Public Safety established a state navy, the Pennsylvania Navy, to protect the Delaware River and its avenues of approach.

On 27 May, the Marines of the Pennsylvania Navy employed row galleys to drive off two British warships in the Delaware River.

On 8 March 1777, the British frigate HMS Levant defeated the Pennsylvania Navy ship Montgomery and her Marines.

Marines joined the crewman of two armed barges in capturing two British supply ships in the Delaware River on 7 March 1778. The barges also supported General Anthony Wayne's brigade as it searched New Jersey for provisions for Washington's army at Valley Forge.

=== Rhode Island ===
On 15 June 1775, sailors and Marines of the Rhode Island State Navy became the first "American navy" when the Rhode Island General Assembly commissioned two ships, the sloop Katy, and Washington, a schooner; and appointed Abraham Whipple as commodore. That same day, he voyaged out to sea and encountered the tender to the British frigate HMS Rose; Whipple and his men eventually captured the tender when they forced it aground. It became the first naval engagement of the American Revolution. Momentarily, Whipple's sloop, Katy, was taken over by the Continental Congress, whose sought a 'national naval force'; it was later renamed and reclassified as the sloop-of-war, Providence.

=== South Carolina ===
On 11 November 1775, militiamen and mariners of the South Carolina Navy aboard Defense participated in the action against the British ships Tamar and Cherokee at Charleston.

=== Virginia ===
Commodore James Barron was in command of the Virginia State Navy during the Revolutionary War.

== See also ==
- History of the United States Marine Corps
- United States Marine Corps
- Marines
