= USS Hannah =

1775 4-gun schooner

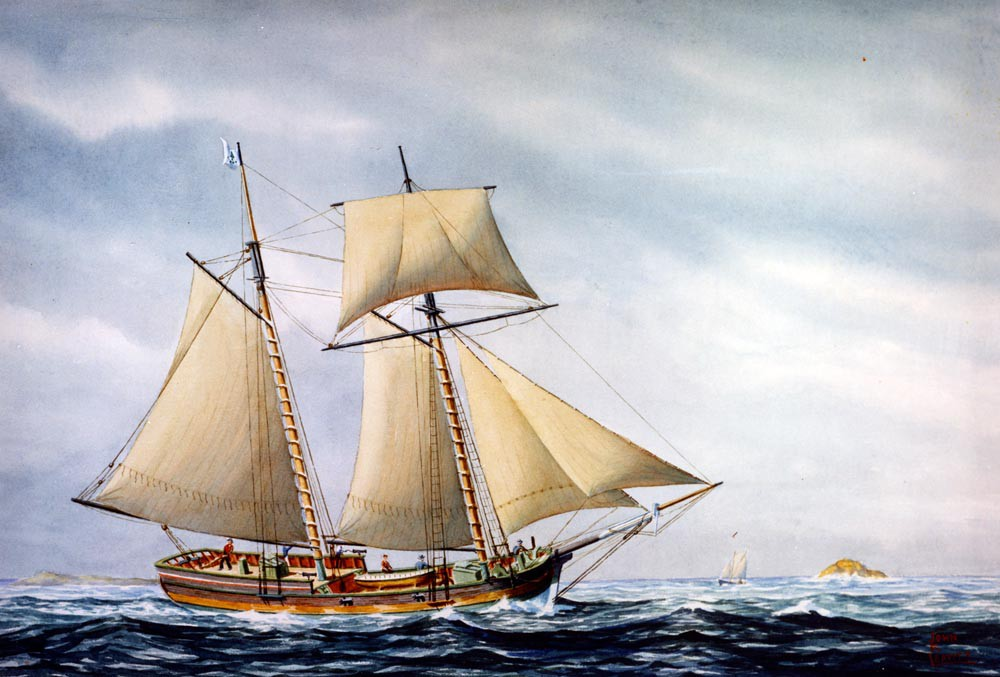
- Painting of Hannah

History

United States
- Acquired: 24 August 1775
- Commissioned: 2 September 1775
- Decommissioned: October 1775
- Out of service: 10 October 1775
- Fate: Decommissioned in October 1775

General characteristics
- Tons burthen: 78
- Propulsion: Sail
- Armament: 4 × 4-pounder guns

USS Hannah was a 4-gun schooner and the first armed American naval vessel of the American Revolution. She was authorized by the Continental Congress and operated by the Continental Army, and is considered by some the first vessel of the Continental Navy. She was originally a fishing schooner owned by John Glover of Marblehead, Massachusetts and was named for his daughter, Hannah Glover. The crew was drawn largely from the town of Marblehead, with much of the ship's ammunition being stored in Glover's warehouse now located at Glover's Square in Marblehead before being relocated to Beverly, Massachusetts.

== Service history ==
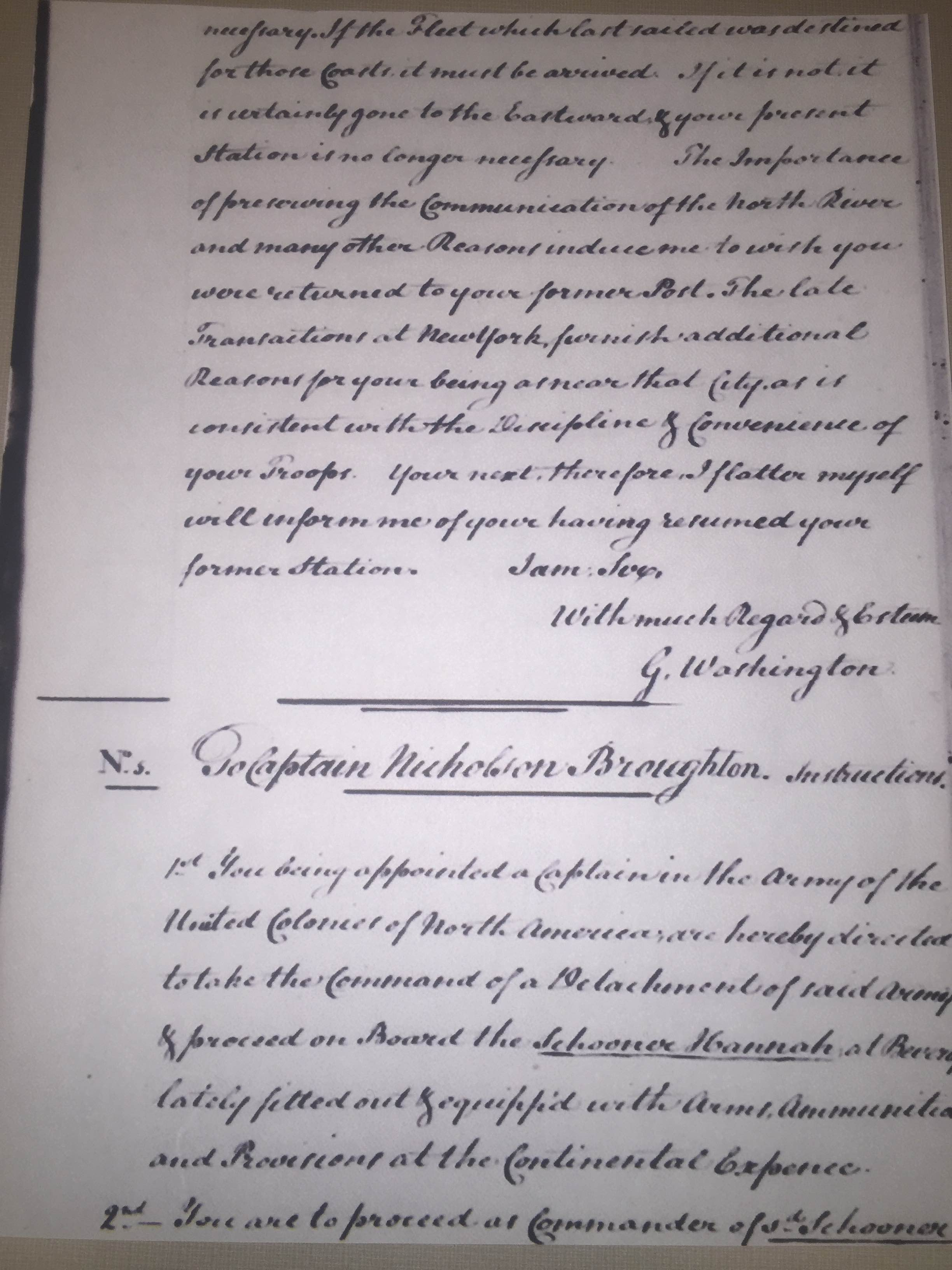
Letter from General George Washington commissioning Nicholson Broughton to command a legal privateering mission against British forces

The schooner was hired into the service of the American Continental Army by General George Washington. Washington commissioned Nicholson Broughton to command the Hannah on 2 September 1775 and ordered the vessel to "cruize against such vessels as may be found . . . bound inward and outward to and from Boston, in the service of the [British] army, and to take and seize all such vessels, laden with soldiers, arms, ammunition, or provisions . . . which you shall have good reason to suspect are in such service." Hannah set sail from the harbor of Beverly, Massachusetts on 5 September 1775, but fled to the protection of the harbor of Gloucester, Massachusetts two days later under the pursuit of HMS Lively and a second British vessel. Leaving Gloucester Harbor, Hannah captured HMS Unity.

=== Washington's fleet ===
Alongside other vessels fitted out by the Marblehead Regiment, the Franklin, the Warren, the Hancock, and the Lee, the first combined naval vessels of the Continental Army and Navy were assembled on Boston's north shore. Three of the four captains of the ships were residents of Marblehead; John Selman, John Manley, and James Mugford who respectively commanded Warren, Lee and Franklin during 1775 and into 1776. Along with another Marblehead native and naval Captain Samuel Tucker, who was the second to command the Franklin, Washington's Fleet attacked British ships up and down the Massachusetts coast. "With crews of experienced Marblehead seamen, these bold and highly skilled mariners captured enemy supply ships filled with ammunition and armaments that were crucial to the American cause of independence. The fleet was believed to have flown the Revolutionary "Pine Tree Flag" with the less common motto "An Appeal to God" signifying the crews' loyalty to their New England woodlands and their religion.

On one of the schooner's first voyages, it encountered the sloop Unity which was owned by John Langdon, a member of the Continental Congress from New Hampshire, but had been taken by the Royal Navy. Rather than returning the ship to its rightful owner, Captain Broughton sailed the ship to Gloucester and requested he and his crew be given the store of salt fish beef and lumber. Washington's orders were to strictly collect munitions only, and his refusal caused a mutiny among the crew, of whom 14 were ordered whipped, but only one was punished.

Hannah's brief naval career ended on 10 October 1775, when she was run aground under the guns of a small American fort near Beverly by the British sloop Nautilus. After a 4-hour engagement between Nautilus and Beverly and Salem militias on the shore, Hannah was saved from destruction and capture. Nautilus was badly damaged, but managed to escape with the rising tide around 8 p.m.. According to the New England Chronicle dated 12 October 1775, "...no lives were lost on our side, and the Privateer [Hannah] was damaged little if any". Other sources however still claim that Hannah was soon decommissioned as General Washington found more suitable ships for his cruisers.

=== Fate ===
According to legend, soon after Hannah's decommissioning, the schooner was towed to Lee's Wharf in Manchester, where its name was changed to Lynch. There, the vessel was restored to working condition by 7 carpenters over the course of 3 weeks. In March 1777, Lynch was sent to France with congressional correspondence for Benjamin Franklin, who was there as U.S. Ambassador. Upon embarking on their journey back to the U.S., Lynch and its crew were captured by British ship HMS Foudroyant. Lynch was sold as a prize by the British and documentation indicates that the schooner was used as a merchant vessel thereafter. Most modern scholars however believe the ship was completely destroyed or at least damaged beyond repair, thus rendering the true fate of the ship unknown. While no imagery of the ship is known to exist, trading and fishing schooners like the model pictured above, as well as those painted below, are commonly thought to be accurate representations.

== Legacy ==
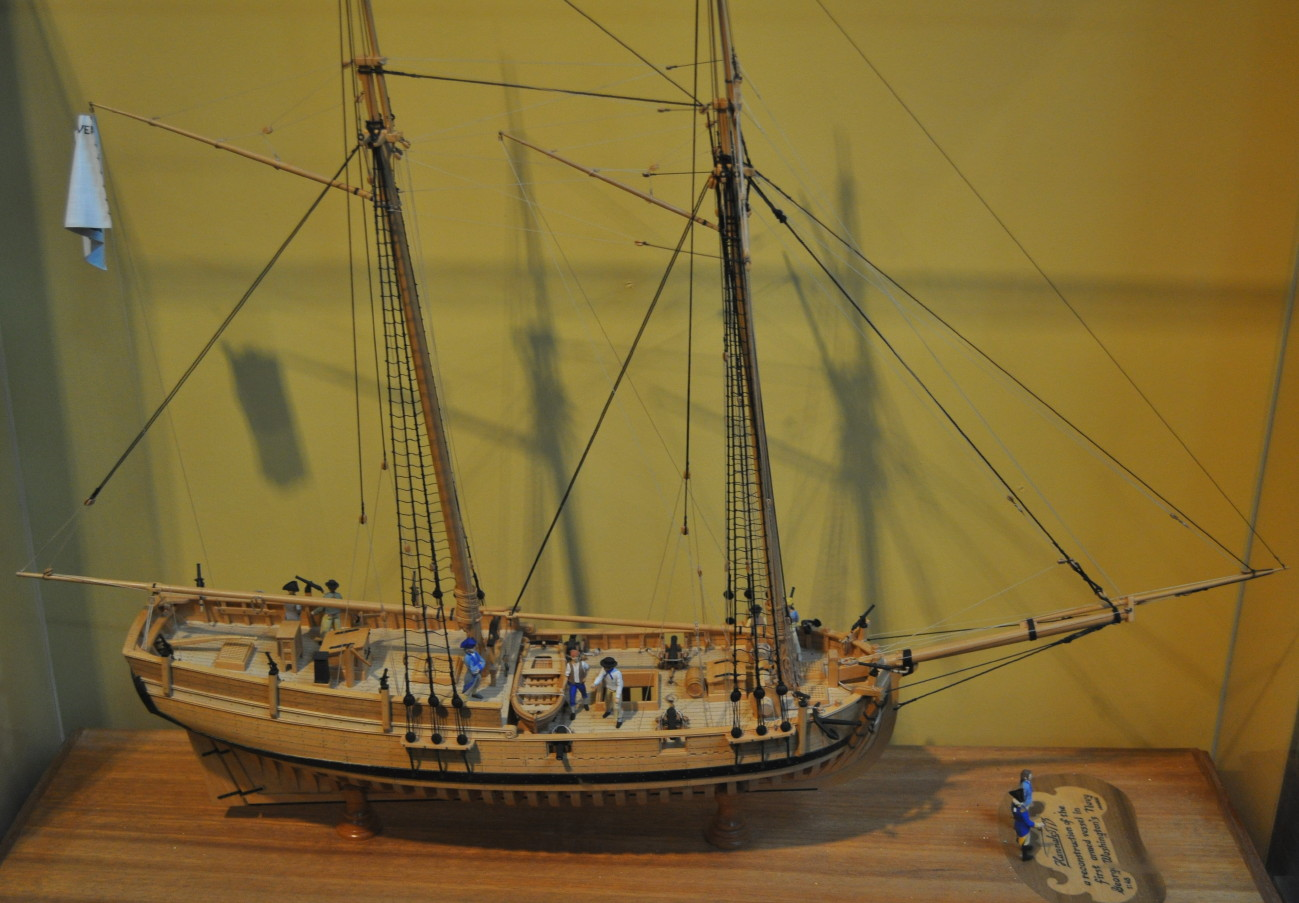
Model of Hannah at the National Museum of the United States Navy

An illustration of the Hannah is on the sleeve of the City of Beverly, Massachusetts Police Department uniforms.

The Hannah Elementary School located in the City of Beverly, Massachusetts is named for the schooner.

The City of Beverly, Massachusetts and the Town of Marblehead, Massachusetts each claim to have been the home port of the schooner. Each continues to assert the honor of being "the Birthplace of the American Navy" from the career of the Hannah. A plaque, currently on display in the Selectmen's room at Abbot Hall in Marblehead, was discovered in the Philadelphia Navy Yard proclaiming Marblehead to be the birthplace of schooner. Beverly refers to itself as "Washington's Naval Base." Alongside the plaque is a display detailing Marblehead's storied Naval history, especially focusing on the importance of the USS Hannah and the rest of the fleet that became the first of the United States Navy. Similarly, the entrance sign to the town of Marblehead features a small inset of an artist's depiction of the USS Hannah. In June 1926 the town celebrated the 150th anniversary as birthplace of the Navy. In 1992, USS Constitution, another important Naval ship that protected Marblehead during the War of 1812, on its final unassisted voyage made a stop in Marblehead Harbor in 1992, before returning to Boston. One of the original gas stations in the town featured a facsimile piece of the hull of Hannah pictured below. After Hannah, Glover refitted five more schooners and personally launched another two from Plymouth. In the coming months though, the Continental Congress recognized the need for a Navy to accompany Washington's Army, smaller private boats such as Hannah fell out of favor. Along with much of the exhibit in Abbott Hall, the history of the town's involvement in the creation of the world's most powerful Navy has been meticulously reconstructed.

== Gallery ==
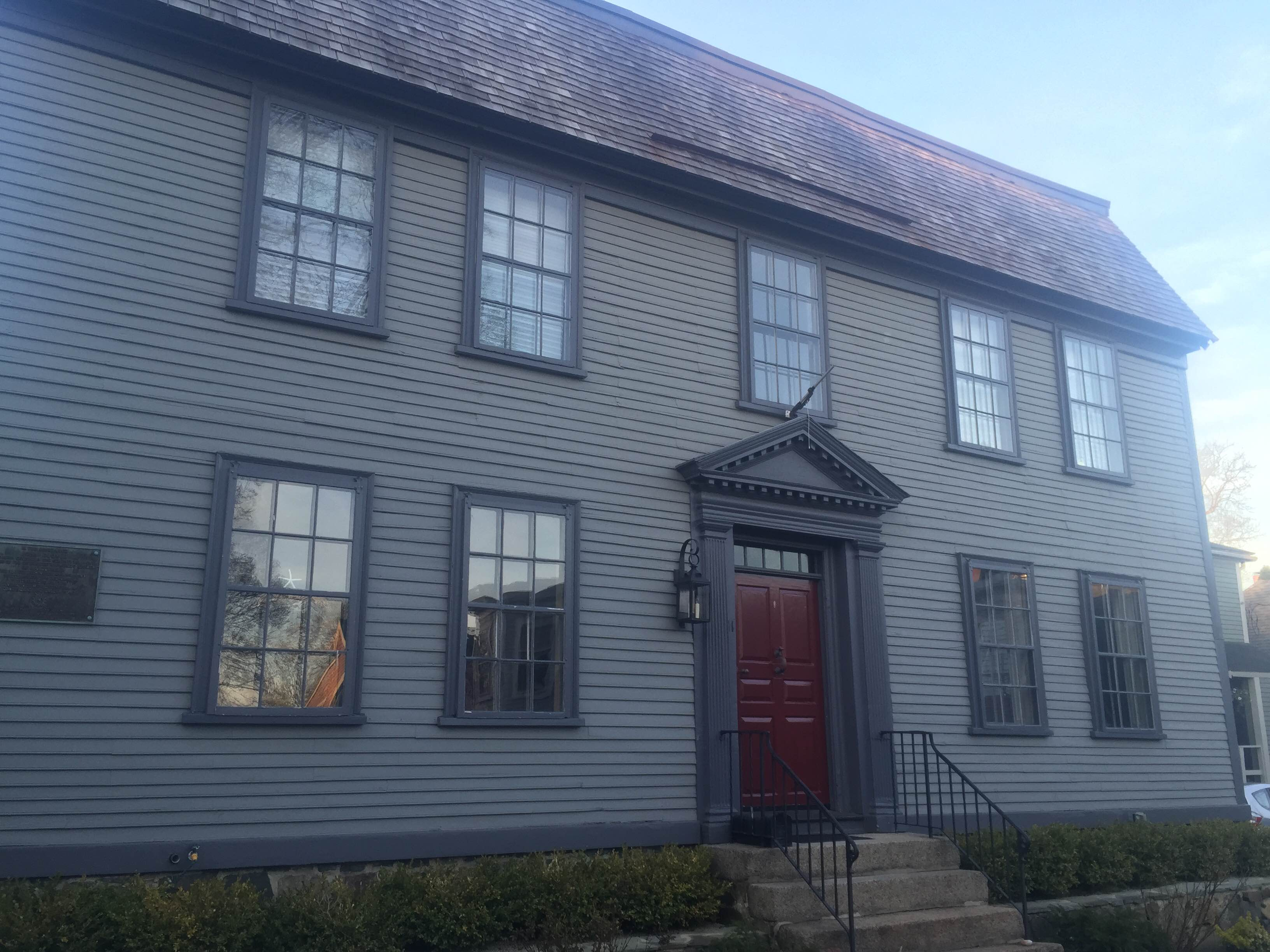

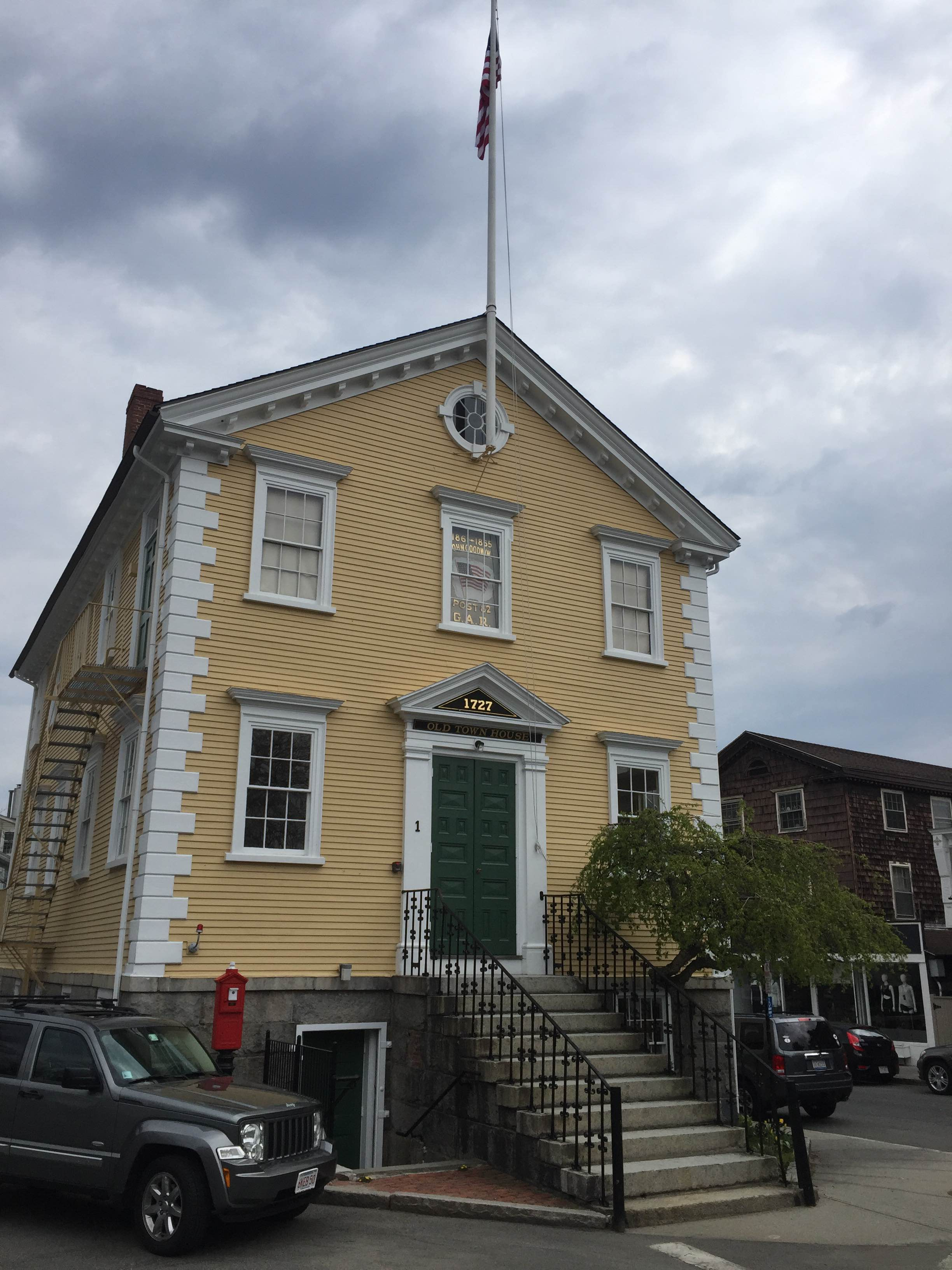

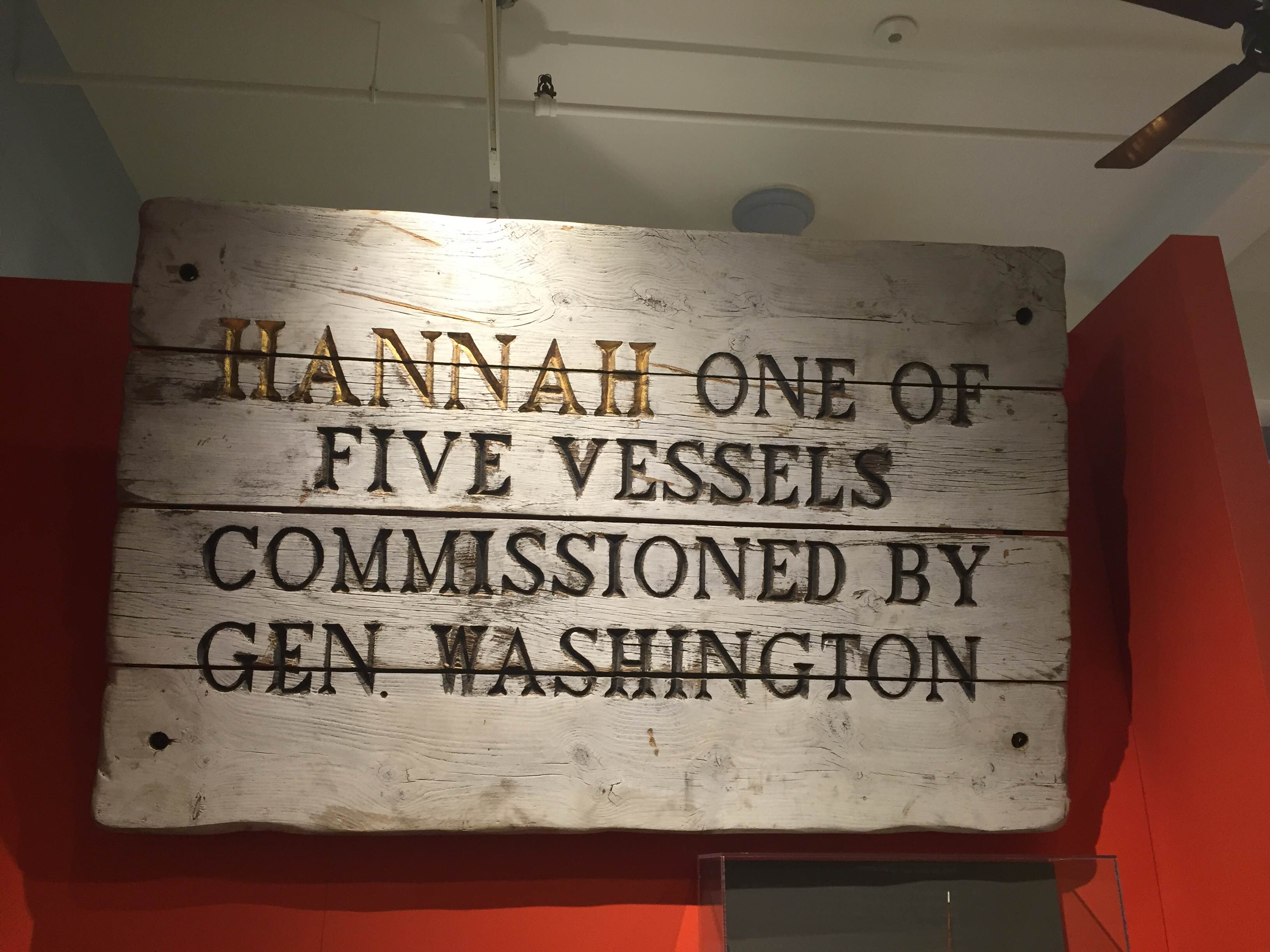

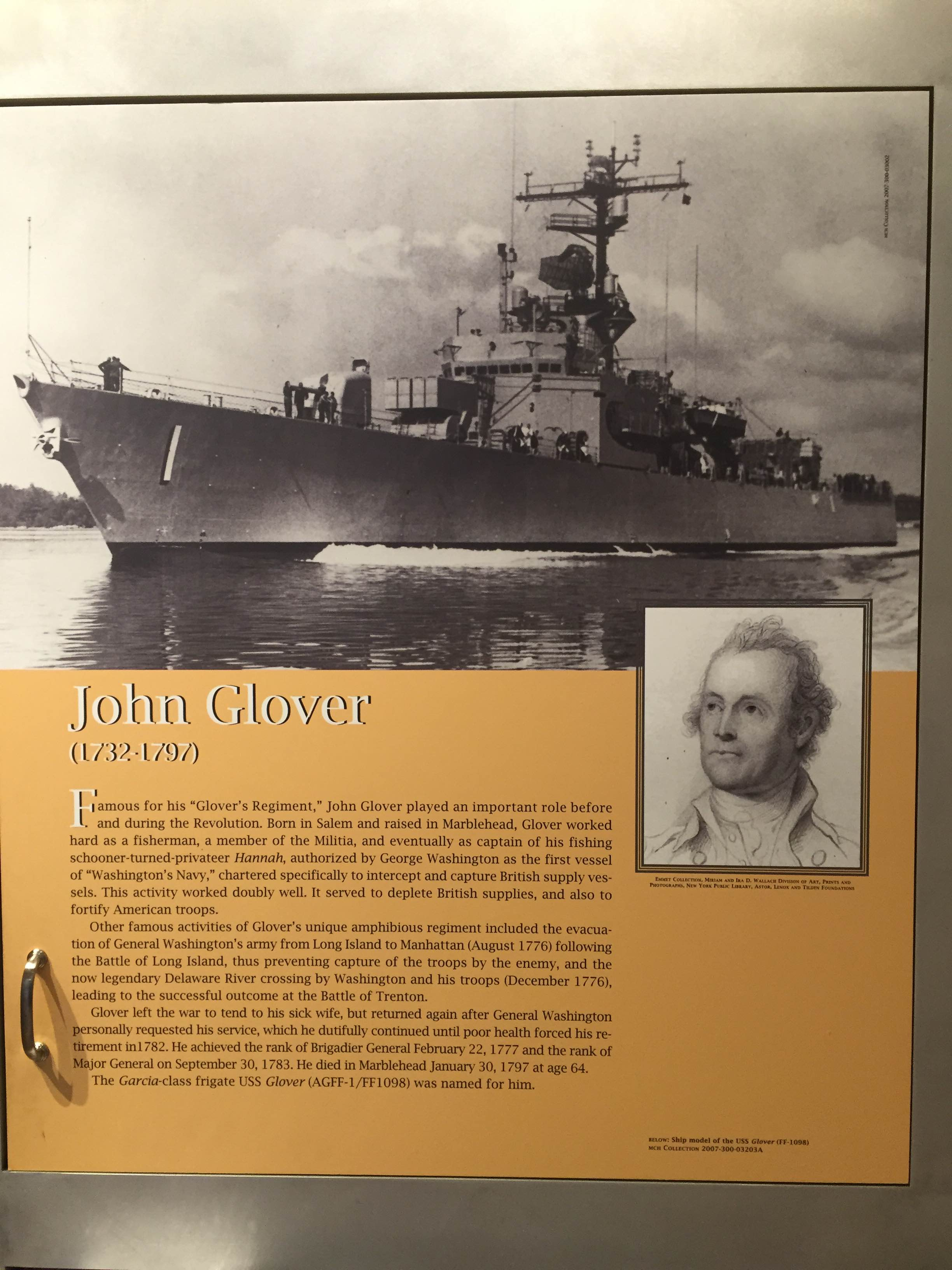

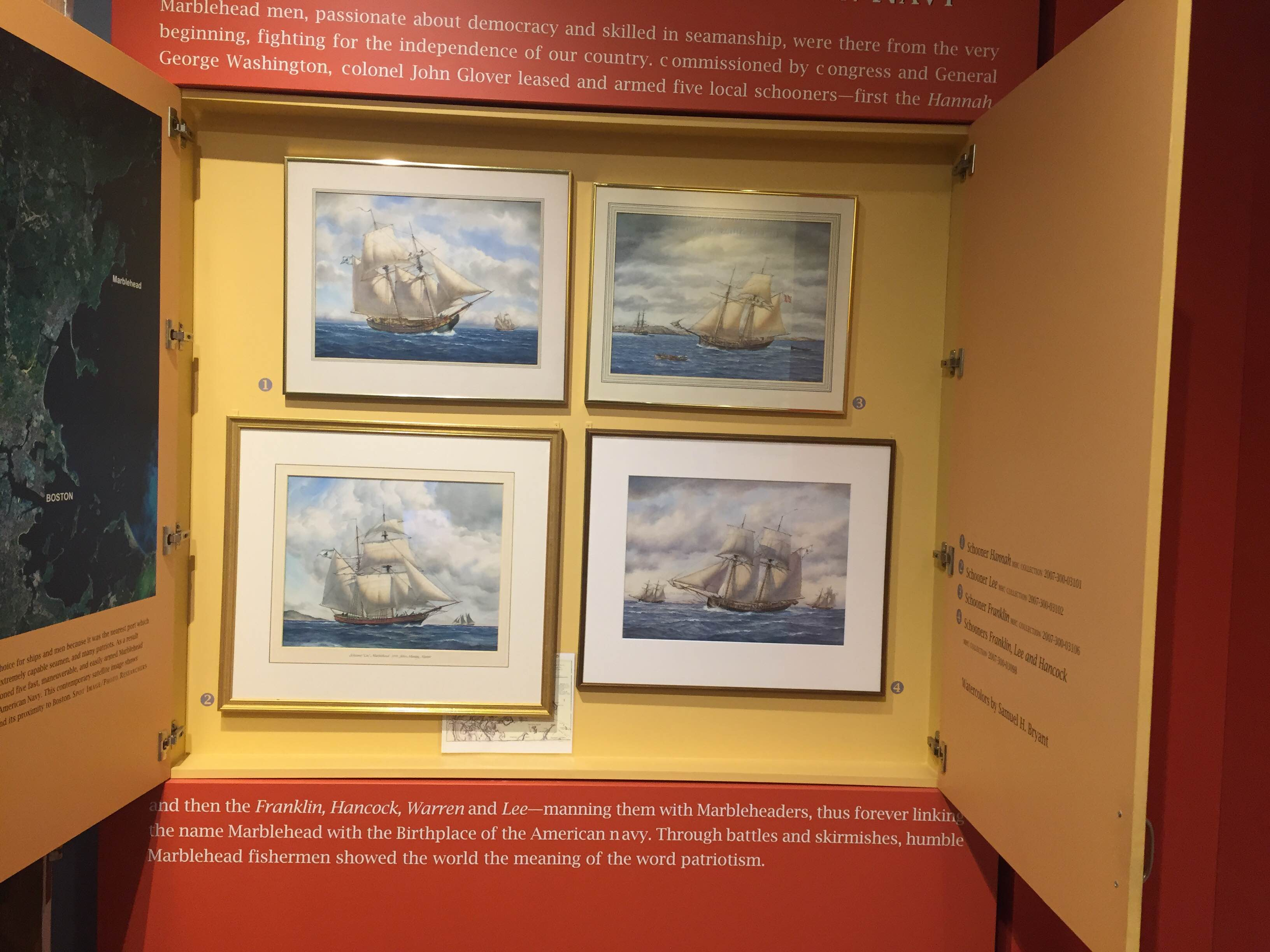

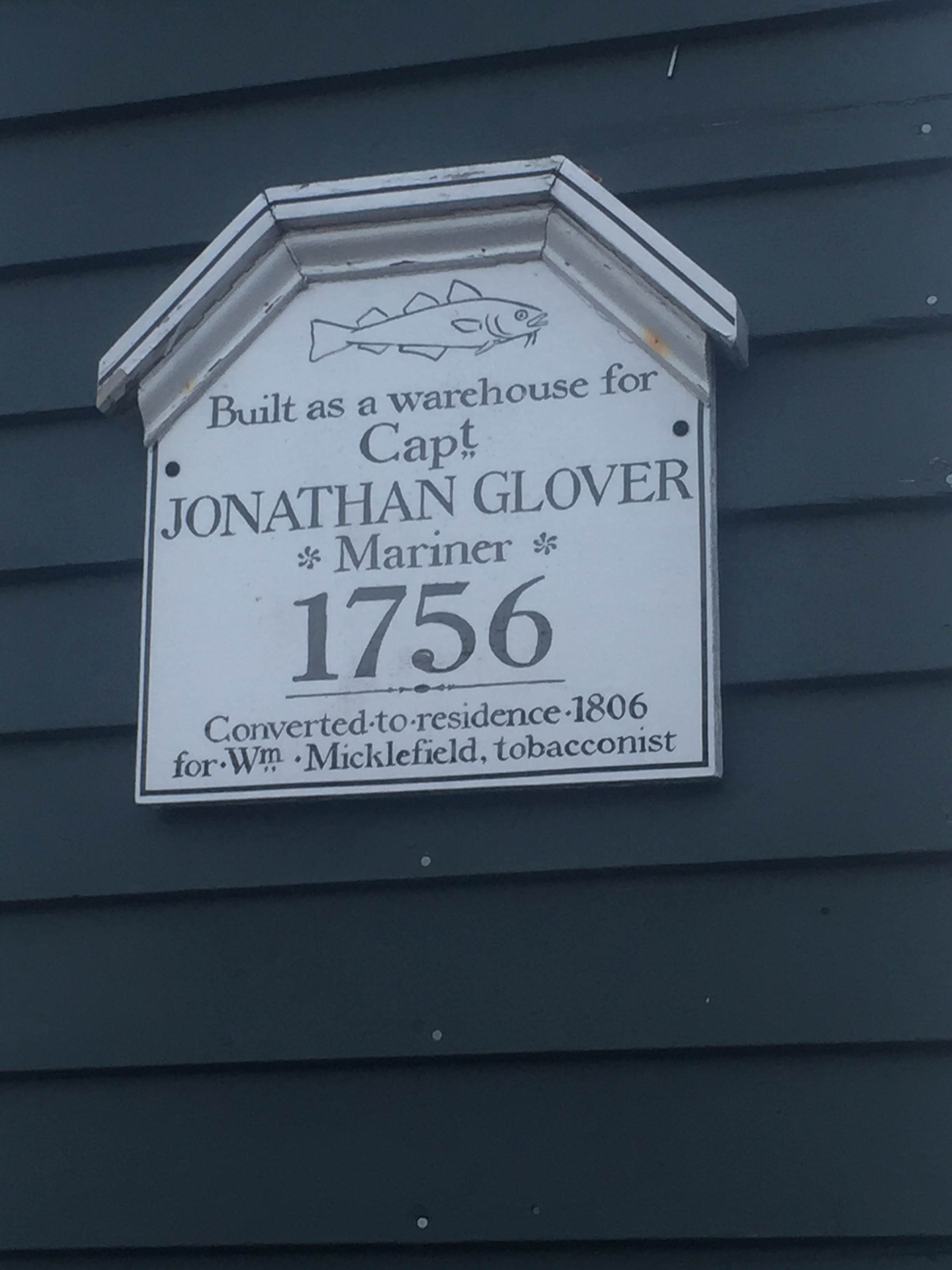

== See also ==
- John Glover (general)
- Naval operations in the American Revolutionary War
- History of the United States Navy
