= Boston campaign =

Opening campaign of the American Revolutionary War

- Part of the American Revolutionary War
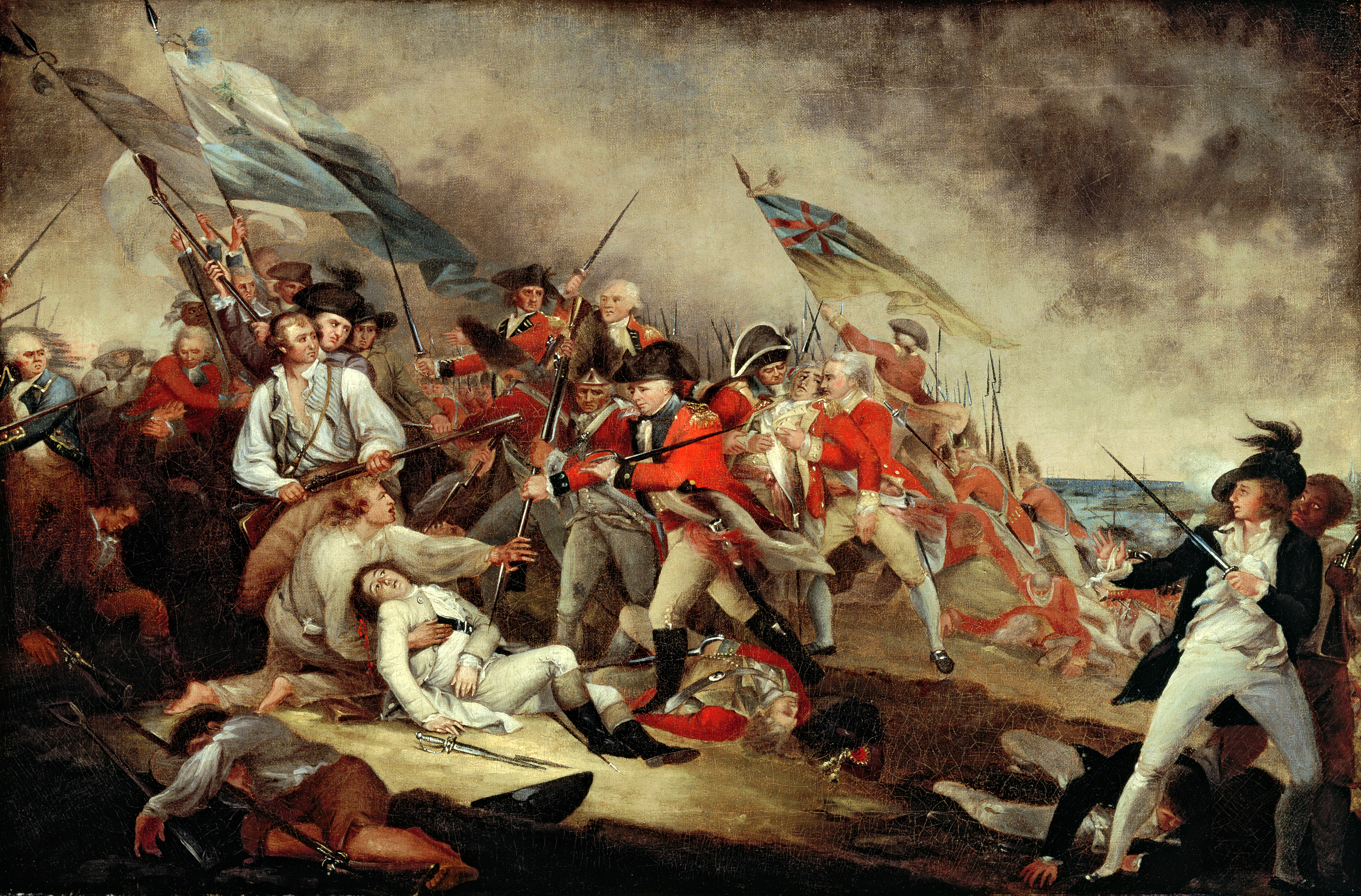
- The Death of General Warren at the Battle of Bunker's Hill, June 17, 1775
Date	April 19, 1775 – March 17, 1776
Location	Province of Massachusetts Bay
Result	American victory
Territorial changes	British forces evacuate from Massachusetts

Belligerents
New England Colonies: Connecticut; Massachusetts Bay; New Hampshire; Rhode Island	Great Britain

Commanders and leaders
George Washington; Artemas Ward; Henry Knox	Thomas Gage; William Howe; Henry Clinton; Samuel Graves

Strength
7,700–16,000	4,000–11,000

Casualties and losses
593	1,505

The Boston campaign was the opening campaign of the American Revolutionary War, taking place primarily in the Province of Massachusetts Bay. The campaign began with the Battles of Lexington and Concord on April 19, 1775, in which the local colonial militias interdicted a British government attempt to seize military stores and leaders in Concord, Massachusetts. The entire British expedition suffered significant casualties during a running battle back to Charlestown against an ever-growing number of militia.

Subsequently, accumulated militia forces surrounded the city of Boston, beginning the siege of Boston. The main action during the siege, the Battle of Bunker Hill on June 17, 1775, was one of the bloodiest encounters of the war, and resulted in a Pyrrhic British victory. There were also numerous skirmishes near Boston and the coastal areas of Boston, resulting in loss of life, military supplies, or both.

In July 1775, George Washington took command of the assembled militia and transformed them into a more coherent army. On March 4, 1776, the colonial army fortified Dorchester Heights with cannon capable of reaching Boston and British ships in the harbor. The siege (and the campaign) ended on March 17, 1776, with the permanent withdrawal of British forces from Boston. To this day, Boston celebrates March 17 as Evacuation Day.

== Background ==
In 1767–68, the British Parliament passed the Townshend Acts, which imposed import duties on paper, glass, paint, and other common items imported into the American colonies. The Sons of Liberty and other Patriot organizations responded with a variety of protest actions. They organized boycotts of the goods subject to the duty, and they harassed and threatened the customs personnel who collected the duties, many of whom were either corrupt or related to Provincial leaders. Francis Bernard, then Governor of the Province of Massachusetts Bay, requested military forces to protect the King's personnel. In October 1768, British troops arrived in the city of Boston and occupied the city. Tensions led to the Boston Massacre on March 5, 1770, and the Boston Tea Party on December 16, 1773.

In response to the Tea Party and other protests, Parliament enacted the Intolerable Acts to punish the colonies. With the Massachusetts Government Act of 1774 it effectively abolished the provincial government of Massachusetts. General Thomas Gage, already the commander-in-chief of British troops in North America, was also appointed governor of Massachusetts and was instructed by King George's government to enforce royal authority in the troublesome colony. However, popular resistance compelled the newly appointed royal officials in Massachusetts to resign or to seek refuge in Boston. Gage commanded four regiments of British regulars (about 4,000 men) from his headquarters in Boston, but the countryside was largely controlled by Patriot sympathizers.

== War begins ==
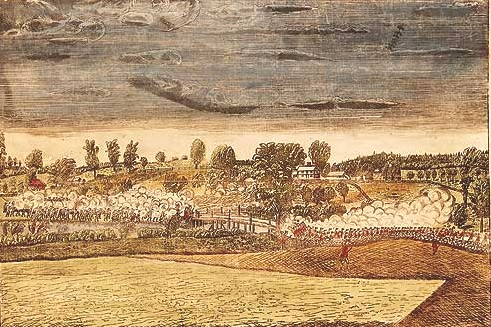
A 1775 Amos Doolittle engraving depicting a bit of the action at the North Bridge in Concord

On September 1, 1774, British soldiers removed gunpowder and other military supplies in a surprise raid on a powder magazine near Boston. This expedition alarmed the countryside, and thousands of American Patriots sprang into action, amid rumors that war was at hand. Although it proved to be a false alarm, this event—known as the Powder Alarm—caused all concerned to proceed more carefully in the days ahead, and essentially provided a "dress rehearsal" for events seven months later. Partly in response to this action, the colonists carried off military supplies from several forts in New England and distributed them among the local militias.

On the night of April 18, 1775, General Gage sent 700 men to seize munitions stored by the colonial militia at Concord. Several riders — including Paul Revere — alerted the countryside, and when the British troops entered Lexington on the morning of April 19, they found 77 minutemen formed up on the village common. Shots were exchanged, eight Minutemen were killed, the outnumbered colonial militia dispersed, and the British moved on to Concord. At Concord, the troops searched for military supplies, but found relatively little, as the colonists, having received warnings that such an expedition might happen, had taken steps to hide many of the supplies. During the search, there was a confrontation at the North Bridge. A small company of British troops fired on a much larger column of colonial militia, which returned fire, and eventually routed the British, who returned to the village center and rejoined the other troops there. By the time the "redcoats" or "lobster backs" (as the British soldiers were called) began the return march to Boston, several thousand militiamen had gathered along the road. A running fight ensued, and the British detachment suffered heavily before reaching Charlestown. With the Battle of Lexington and Concord — the "shot heard 'round the world" — the war had begun.

== Siege of Boston ==
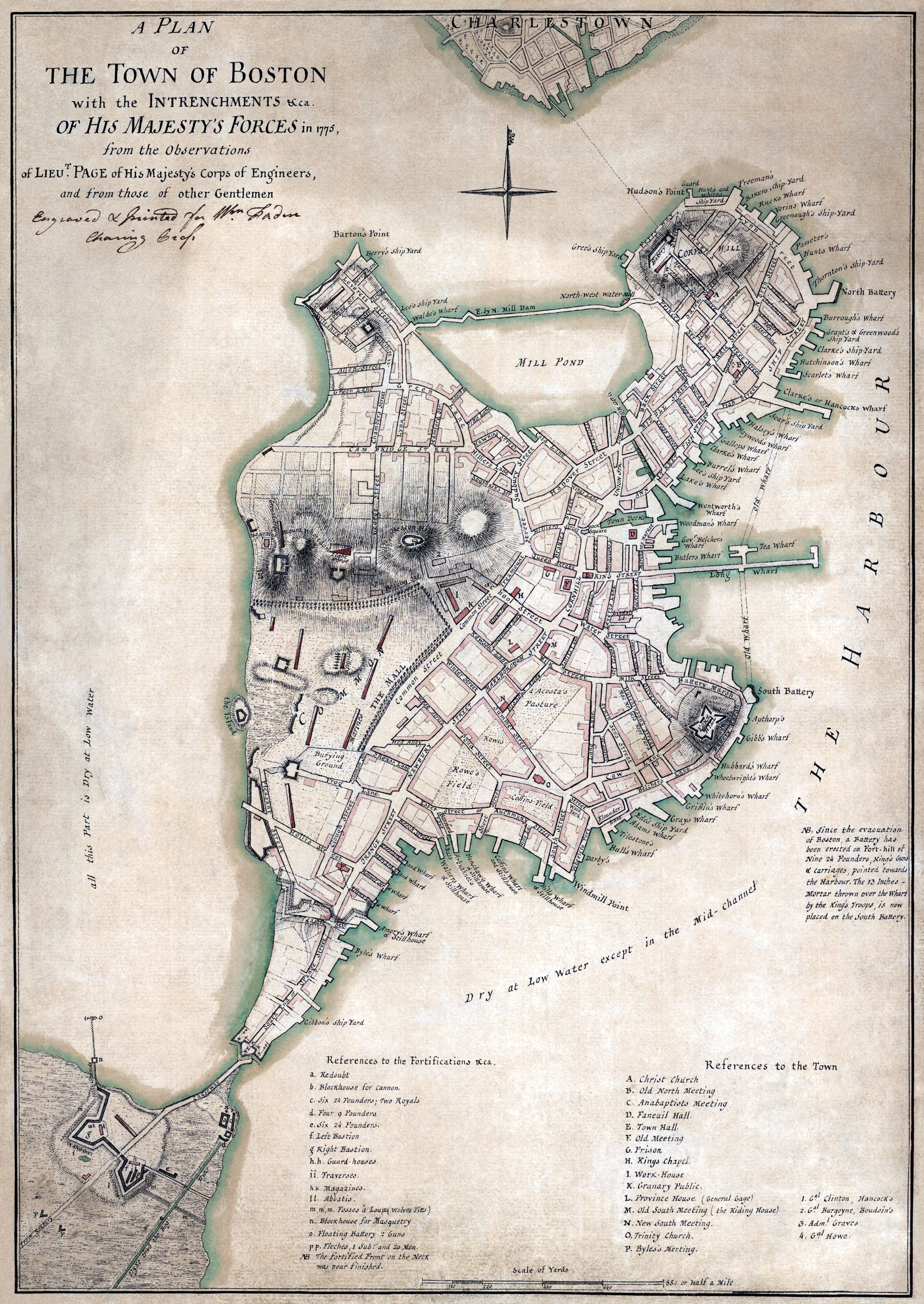
A map showing a British tactical evaluation of Boston in 1775.

In the aftermath of the failed Concord expedition, the thousands of militiamen that had converged on Boston remained. Over the next few days, more arrived from further afield, including companies from New Hampshire, Connecticut, and Rhode Island. Under the command of Artemas Ward, they surrounded the city, blocking its land approaches and putting the occupied city under siege. The British regulars fortified the high points in the city.

=== Need for supplies ===
While the British were able to resupply the city by sea, supplies in Boston were short. Troops were sent out to some of the islands in Boston Harbor to raid farmers for supplies. In response, the colonials began clearing those islands of supplies useful to the British. One of these actions was contested by the British in the Battle of Chelsea Creek, but it resulted in the loss of two British soldiers and the British ship Diana. The need for building materials and other supplies led Admiral Samuel Graves to authorize a Loyalist merchant to send his ships from Boston to Machias in the District of Maine, accompanied by a Royal Navy schooner. The Machias townspeople rose up, seizing the merchant vessels and then the schooner after a short battle in which its commander was killed. Their resistance and that of other coastal communities led Graves to authorize an expedition of reprisal in October whose sole significant act was the Burning of Falmouth. The outrage in the colonies over this action contributed to the passing of legislation by the Second Continental Congress that established the Continental Navy.

The colonial army also had issues with supply, and with command. Its diverse militias needed to be organized, fed, clothed, and armed, and command needed to be coordinated, as each militia leader was responsible to his province's congress.

Washington wanted to both retaliate for the British Burning of Falmouth as well as interrupt and acquire British armaments approaching Boston. Toward this end, in October 1775, General Washington ordered the first American naval expedition. Washington borrowed two vessels from John Glover's Marblehead Regiment. Glover recruited Captain Nicholson Broughton in the Hancock and Captain John Selman (privateer) in the Franklin. Their expedition north led to capturing fishing vessels off Canso, Nova Scotia, and the Raid on Charlottetown (1775).

=== Bunker Hill ===
Late in May, General Gage received by sea about 2,000 reinforcements and a trio of generals who would play a vital role in the war: William Howe, John Burgoyne, and Henry Clinton. They formulated a plan to break out of the city, which was finalized on June 12. Reports of these plans made their way to the commanders of the besieging forces, who decided that additional defensive steps were necessary.

On the night of June 16–17, 1775, a detachment of the colonial army stealthily marched onto the Charlestown peninsula, which the British had abandoned in April, and fortified Bunker Hill and Breed's Hill. On June 17, British forces under General Howe attacked and seized the Charlestown peninsula in the Battle of Bunker Hill. This battle was technically a British victory, but losses (about 1/3 the attacking forces killed or wounded, including a significant fraction of the entire British officer corps in all of North America) were so heavy that the attack was not followed up. The siege was not broken, and General Gage was recalled to England in September and replaced by General Howe as the British commander-in-chief.

=== Formation of the Continental Army ===
The Second Continental Congress, meeting in Philadelphia, had received reports of the situation outside Boston when it began to meet in May 1775. In response to the confusion over command in the camps there, and in response to the May 10 capture of Fort Ticonderoga, the need for unified military organization became clear. Congress officially adopted the forces outside Boston as the Continental Army on May 26, and named George Washington its commander-in-chief on June 15. Washington left Philadelphia for Boston on June 21, but did not learn of the action at Bunker Hill until he reached New York City.

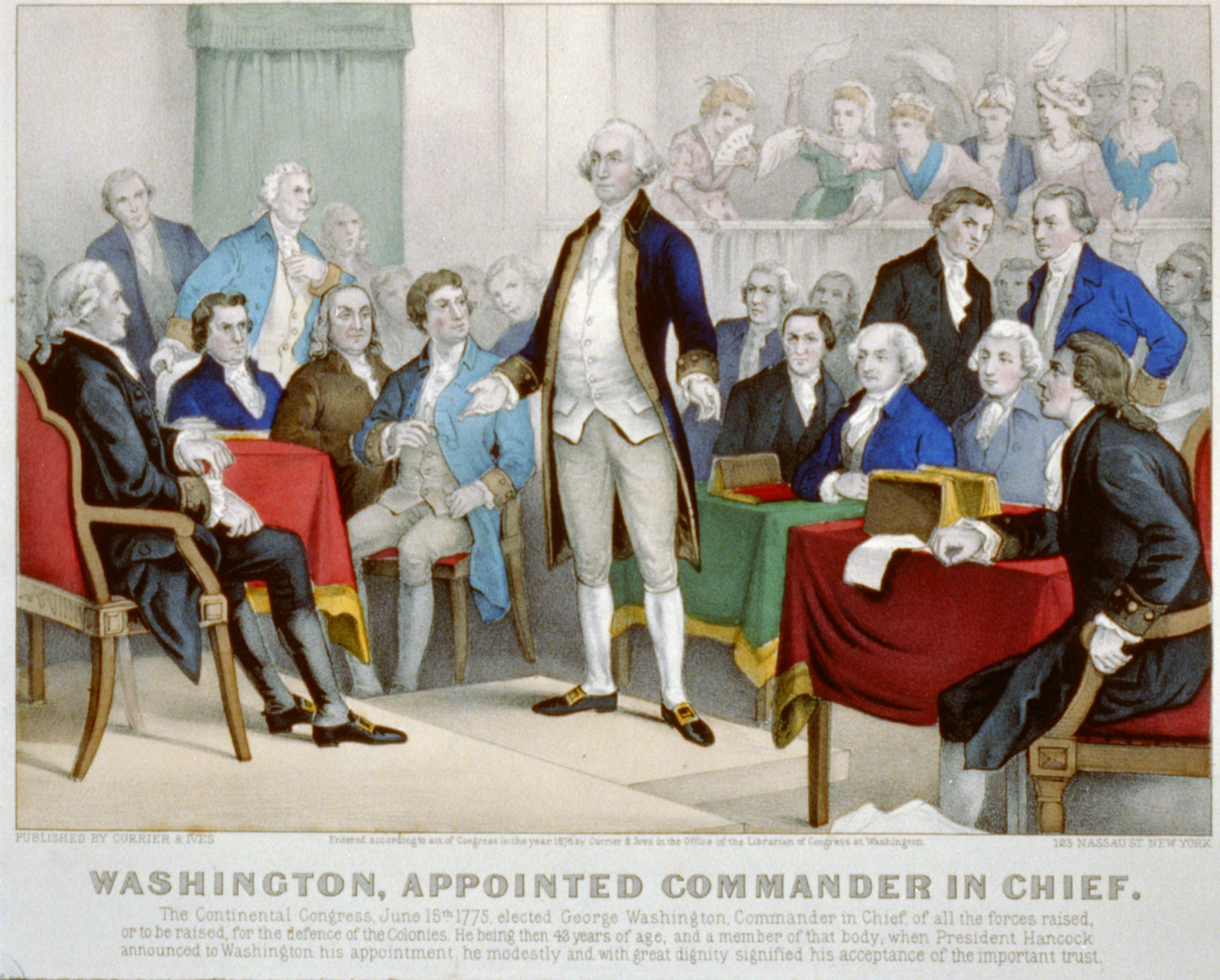
A Currier and Ives print depicting George Washington accepting the role of Commander-in-chief of the Continental Army from Congress.

=== Stalemate ===
Following the Battle of Bunker Hill, the siege was effectively stalemated, as neither side had either a clearly dominant position, or the will and materiel to significantly alter its position. When Washington took command of the army in July, he determined that its size had reduced from 20,000 to about 13,000 men fit for duty. He also established that the battle had severely depleted the army's powder stock, which was eventually alleviated by powder shipments from Philadelphia. The British were also busy bringing in reinforcements; by the time of Washington's arrival the British had more than 10,000 men in the city.

Throughout the summer and fall of 1775, both sides dug in, with occasional skirmishes, but neither side chose to take any significant action. Congress, seeking to take some initiative and to capitalize on the capture of Ticonderoga, authorized an invasion of Canada, after several letters to the inhabitants of Canada were rejected by the French-speaking and British colonists there. In September, Benedict Arnold led 1,100 troops on an expedition through the wilderness of Maine, which was drawn from the army assembled outside Boston.

Washington faced a personnel crisis toward the end of 1775, as most of the troops in the army had enlistments that expired at the end of 1775. He introduced a number of recruitment incentives and was able to keep the army sufficiently large to maintain the siege, although it was by then smaller than the besieged forces.

== Siege ends ==
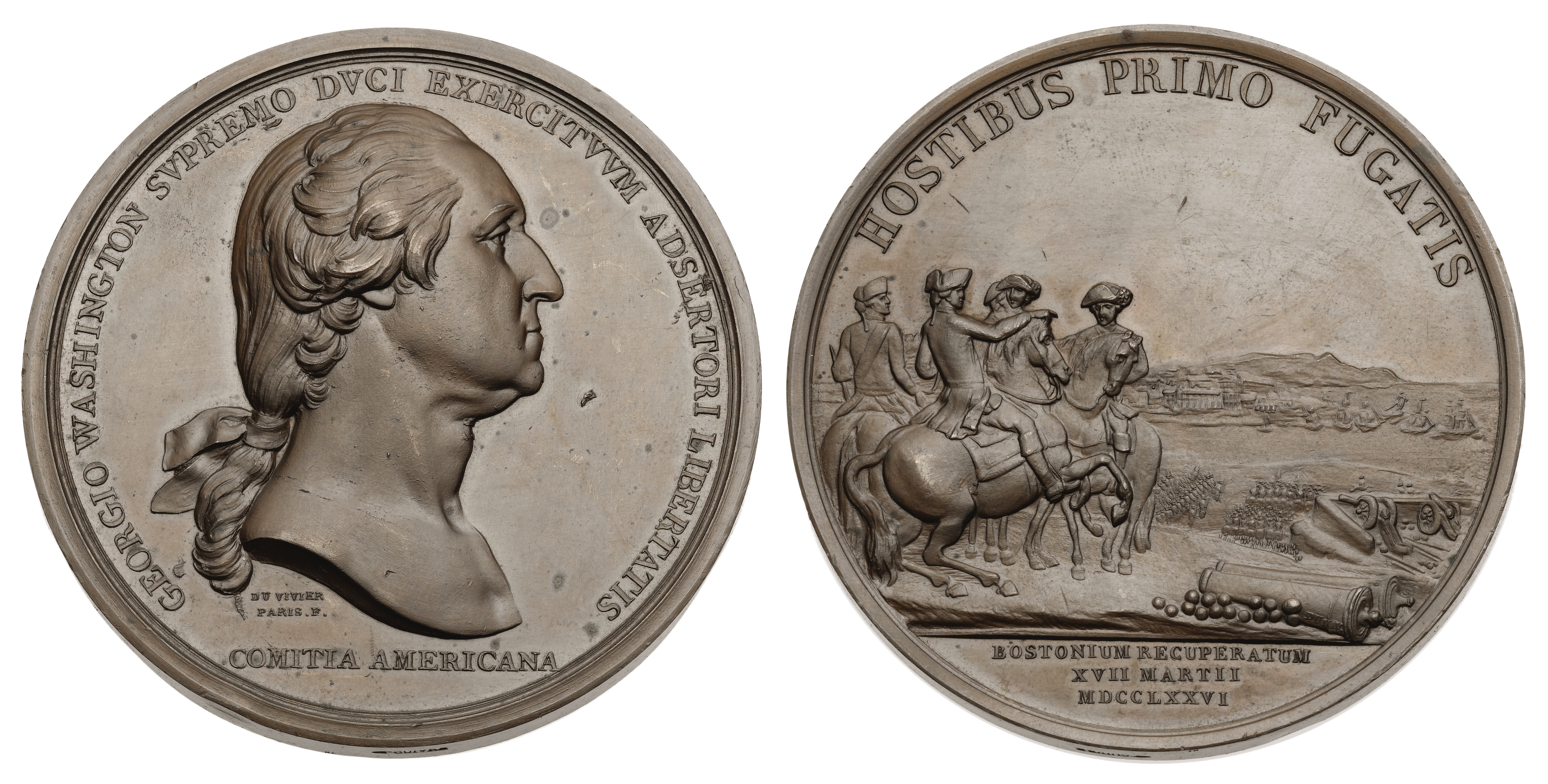
Washington was awarded the first Congressional Gold Medal in 1790 for his first victory of the war in Boston.

By early March 1776, heavy cannons that had been captured at Fort Ticonderoga were moved to Boston, a difficult feat engineered by Henry Knox. When the guns were placed on Dorchester Heights in the course of one day, overlooking the British positions, the British situation became untenable. While General Howe planned an attack to reclaim the high ground, a snowstorm prevented its execution. The British, after threatening to burn the city if their departure was hindered, evacuated the city on March 17, 1776, and sailed for temporary refuge in Halifax, Nova Scotia. The local militias dispersed and, in April, General Washington took most of the Continental Army to fortify New York City and the start of the New York and New Jersey campaign.

== Legacy ==
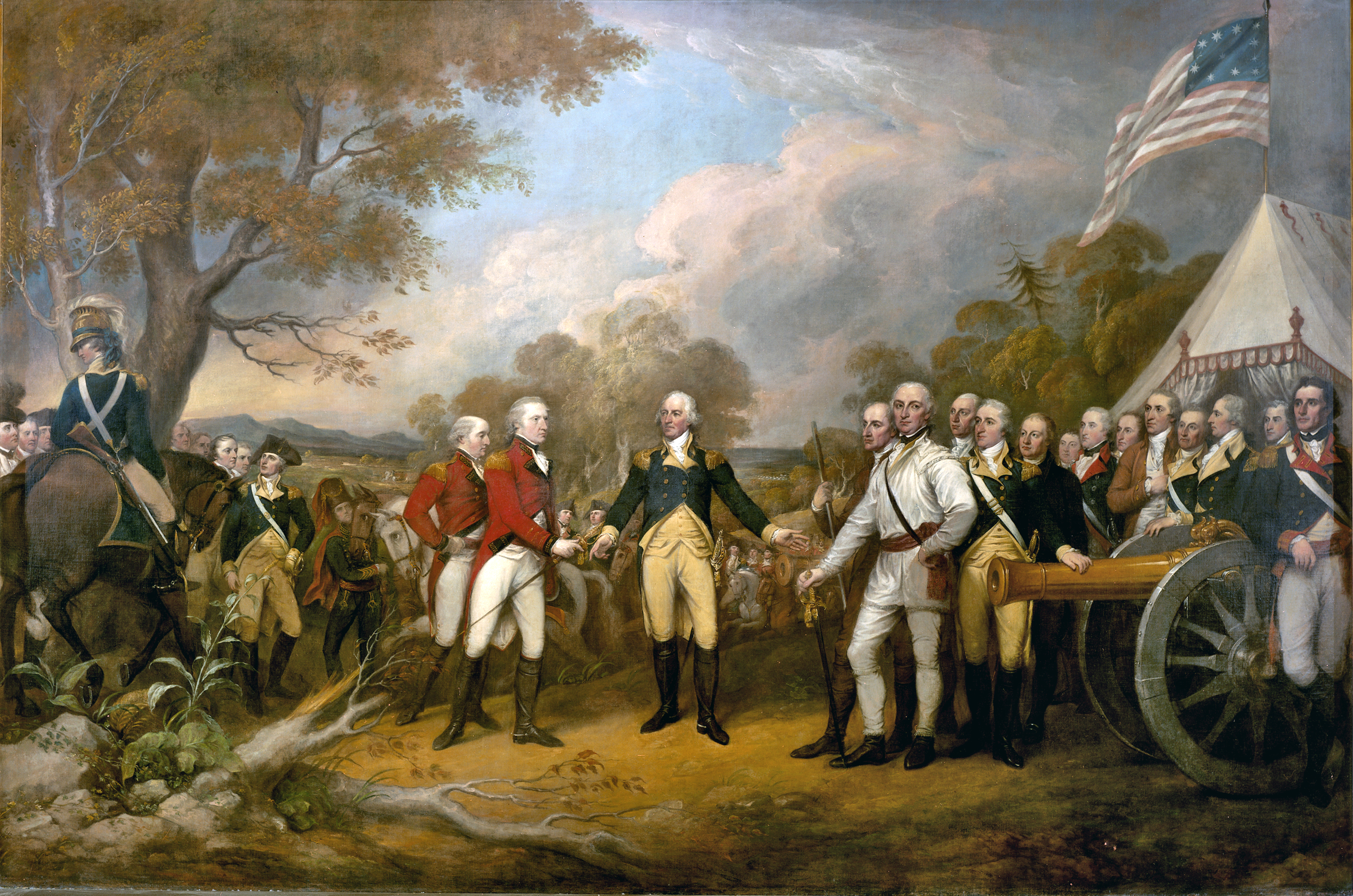
John Trumbull's Surrender of General Burgoyne

The British were essentially driven from New England as a result of this campaign, although there (as elsewhere in the colonies) they continued to receive support from local Loyalists, especially in Newport, Rhode Island, from which they drove most of the local Patriots. The campaign, as well as the final result of the war as a whole, were a significant blow to British prestige and confidence in its military. The senior military leaders of the campaign were criticized for their actions (Clinton, for example, while he went on to command the British forces in North America, would take much of the blame for the British loss of the war), and others either saw no more action in the war (Gage), or were ultimately disgraced (Burgoyne, who surrendered his army at Saratoga). While the British continued to control the seas, and had military successes on the ground (notably in New York, New Jersey, and Pennsylvania), their actions that led to these conflicts had the effect of uniting the Thirteen Colonies in opposition to the crown. As a result, they were never able to marshal enough support from Loyalists to regain meaningful political control of the colonies.

The colonies, in spite of their differences, united themselves as a consequence of these events, granting the Second Continental Congress (predecessor to the modern U.S. Congress) sufficient authority and funding to conduct the revolution as a unified whole, including funding and outfitting the military forces that formed as a result of this campaign.

== See also ==
- List of American Revolutionary War battles
- Saratoga Campaign
- Northern theater of the American Revolutionary War after Saratoga
