= 14th Continental Regiment =

Glover's Regiment 14th Continental Regiment
- Active: 1775–1776
- Allegiance: United States
- Type: Infantry
- Role: amphibious
- Size: 728 soldiers
- Part of: Massachusetts Line
- Nickname: Marblehead Regiment
- Engagements: Battle of Long Island; Battle of Pell's Point; Battle of White Plains; Battle of Trenton

Commanders
- Notable commanders: John Glover

The 14th Continental Regiment, also known as the Marblehead Regiment, Marbleheaders, and Glover's Regiment, was raised as a Massachusetts militia regiment in 1775, and taken into the Continental Army establishment during the summer of 1775. When the Continental Army was reestablished for 1776, the regiment was redesignated the 14th Continental. Composed of seafaring men from the area around Marblehead, Massachusetts, it manned the boats during the New York and New Jersey campaign of 1776 and the crossing of the Delaware River before and after the Battle of Trenton. The men of the regiment were only enlisted for one and a half years, and the regiment was disbanded on December 31, 1776, in eastern Pennsylvania.

== Background ==
The Marblehead, Massachusetts, unit was originally formed in January 1775 after a town meeting voted to reorganize the militia, stripping the existing Tory commanders of their military powers and assigning Jeremiah Lee as the regimental commander. John Glover was elected second lieutenant colonel. The regiment armed itself in part using captured weapons and powder seized during a night time raid of HMS Lively led by Samuel Trevett in early February.

On February 26, 1775, members of the Marblehead militia confronted 240 British troops under the command of Colonel Alexander Leslie after a standoff at the North Bridge in Salem, Massachusetts. Leslie landed his troops in Marblehead, under orders of General Thomas Gage to proceed to Salem and confiscate artillery that was hidden there. Word quickly spread through Marblehead and Salem, and the Salem militia was waiting at the bridge when Leslie arrived. After a tense standoff, Leslie ended up retreating to Marblehead where he was met by the Marblehead militia, which had fallen in to reinforce the troops in Salem. The Marbleheaders followed Leslie's troops back to their boats, mocking them as they marched.

Although the Marblehead militia was not present at the Battles of Lexington and Concord, the event had a significant impact on its command. Lee and Glover met with Elbridge Gerry, Samuel Adams, and John Hancock at Weatherby's Black Horse Tavern in Menotomy on April 18. Lee and Glover planned on staying for the night, but in the early morning of April 19, they were forced to flee in their bed clothes as the oncoming British troops searched the tavern. Lee fell sick from exposure after hiding in a nearby field, and died days later. Glover then took over command of the militia.

The Marblehead militia was formally adopted as a regiment of the Continental Army in Cambridge, Massachusetts, on June 22, 1775, with 10 companies totalling 505 officers and men. On July 1, Glover received a colonel's commission from the Continental Congress and the unit was designated the 21st Massachusetts Regiment. In mid-December, Glover's regiment left Cambridge and returned to Marblehead and Beverly at the end of their terms of enlistment. The unit was reorganized as the 14th Continental Regiment on January 1, 1776.

== Washington's fleet ==
In the summer of 1775 during the Siege of Boston, the British troops were able to maintain a steady stream of provisions through ships arriving from Nova Scotia, the West Indies, and England. In an effort to disrupt these supply lines, General George Washington turned to Glover for naval assistance. Glover made available the 78-ton schooner Hannah, the wharf he owned in Beverly, and a captain and crew selected from his regiment. Although the success of the Hannah was limited, Washington was convinced of the need of a greater naval presence. He put Glover and his regiment in charge of outfitting and manning the Franklin, Hancock, Lee, and Warren in the fall of 1775. The Hancock and Franklin were sent to the St Lawrence and participated in the Raid on Charlottetown (1775). This small navy was able to disrupt the British supply lines, capturing much needed arms and other supplies for the Continental Army.

As the small naval force began to return to port with prize vessels, Washington became concerned that the Beverly base would gain the attention of the British. In December 1775, Washington dispatched the Marblehead Regiment from Cambridge to fortify and defend Beverly. By mid-1776 Beverly Harbor was protected by five separate forts, with the 14th Continental responsible for much of the task of defending them.

== Combat ==
=== Battle of Long Island ===
On July 11, 1776, Glover was ordered to rejoin the main army in New York. The unit arrived in Manhattan on August 3, but was not ordered onto Long Island until August 28, after the Battle of Long Island. The unit took a position on the Brooklyn defense perimeter between Fort Putnam and Wallabout Bay where they immediately faced intense skirmishing into the night. On the following day, Washington made the decision to evacuate his troops, and that evening under stormy conditions, ordered Glover and the 14th Continental to ferry the entire army across the mile-wide East River. On the morning on the August 30 under cover of fog, Glover and his men completed the task of moving the troops, horses, artillery and supplies across to Manhattan without the loss of a single life and without detection by the enemy.

=== Kip's Bay ===
In early September 1776, Washington intended to use Glover's men in another amphibious operation to remove the sick, wounded and additional military supplies from Manhattan. A call went out to the New York legislature to send four Albany Sloops for the purpose, but these never arrived. Whether or not the 14th Continental ultimately participated in the removal of the casualties is disputed. On September 4, Washington put Glover in charge of a brigade that included the 14th Continental in a division commanded by General Israel Putnam. On September 14, Glover's brigade marched to Harlem to rejoin the main army. On September 15, the British landed on Manhattan at Kip's Bay, which led to a panic-stricken retreat by the American troops defending the shore, including two brigades sent to reinforce them. Despite Washington's best efforts to stop the retreat, they fled towards Kingsbridge until they met six brigades including Glover's that had been marched down from Harlem. Glover brought the troops into a line on a hill to meet the British, but Washington later ordered the troops to fall back.

=== Pell's Point and White Plains ===
On October 14, 1776, Washington ordered the 14th and three other Massachusetts Regiments, placed under Glover's temporary command, to Eastchester to guard against a potential enemy landing at Pell's Point. On October 18, while Washington was withdrawing the remainder of his troops to White Plains, General William Howe ordered an amphibious landing at Pell's Point. What ensued came to be known as the Battle of Pell's Point; it was a significant strategic victory under Glover, although it appears that he held the 14th in reserve and they did not participate directly in the battle. The 14th only moved forward to cover the final retreat across the Hutchinson River at the end of the day. As Washington's army fell back to White Plains, Glover's men continued to harass the enemy. On October 20, Glover's brigade launched a raid behind enemy lines to bring back 200 barrels of pork and flour that had been left in Eastchester. Several days later a scouting patrol from the 14th Regiment unexpectedly ran into a party of Hessians, killing twelve and taking three prisoner. Glover's men also participated in the Battle of White Plains, principally as part of the artillery engagement and later as the rear guard as Washington moved on to New Jersey. Glover's brigade left White Plains to rejoin the rest of the army on November 22.

=== Battle of Trenton ===
As the end of 1776 approached, Washington faced a desperate situation. Morale was low, and the enlistments for many of his regiments, including the 14th, were set to expire at the end of the year. Washington decided to get one more battle in before these troops left the service. Howe had pursued Washington through New Jersey, but as Washington crossed the Delaware River into Pennsylvania, his troops had collected all the boats they could find, effectively preventing Howe's further advance. Howe halted his campaign for the winter, moving most of his army back to New York, but leaving a chain of garrisons behind to hold New Jersey. Washington devised a plan to attack the garrison at Trenton, and selected Glover and the 14th Regiment to ferry his troops across the Delaware. The 14th were provided a number of Durham boats for the task, averaging 60 feet (18 m) in length with an 8 feet (2.4 m) beam, each capable of holding an entire regiment. The boats were propelled by oars measuring 18 feet (5.5 m) on the downstream side and poles on the upstream side. Washington ordered the operation for the night of December 25–26, which turned out to be a howling snow storm. As the 14th ferried the heavily laden boats across, they had to contend with ice forming on the gear, and cakes of ice that needed to be wrestled out of the way. In addition to ferrying the troops, the 14th was responsible for ferrying the artillery that was under the command of Colonel Henry Knox. At 3am on the morning of December 26, three hours behind schedule, the 14th Regiment completed their task.

After the crossing of the Delaware was completed, the 14th Regiment joined the other regiments in Glover's brigade in General John Sullivan's division and were part of the American victory at the Battle of Trenton that immediately followed. The 14th Regiment then assisted in they ferrying of Washington's force and approximately 900 Hessian prisoners back across the Delaware.

== End of service ==
After the Battle of Trenton, Washington attempted to persuade the Marbleheaders to remain in the army for another six weeks by offering a bounty, but few took him up on the offer. William R. Lee, former brigade major of the 14th was commissioned as a colonel on January 1, 1777, and a new regiment was formed. Only nine of the 14th Regiment's thirty-two officers re-enlisted. On preparing to return home, members of the Marblehead Regiment learned that some Continental frigates were in the Delaware River. The men offered to sail the vessels to the relative safety of New England waters, but the offer was refused. After returning home to Marblehead, most of the men took up the more profitable trade of privateering for the remainder of the American Revolutionary War.

The lineage and honors are carried on by the 101st Engineer Battalion.

== Memorials ==
At the entrance to the Trenton Battle Monument in Trenton New Jersey are the bronze statues of two soldiers. One of the statues is of Private John Russell, a member of the 14th Regiment.

== Notable members ==
- Lt. Col.John Gerry
- Captain Nicholson Broughton
- John Selman (privateer)

== See also ==
- American colonial marines
