= Raid on Yarmouth, Nova Scotia (1775) =

1775 military operation

Coordinates: 43.807°N 66.158°W

Raid on Yarmouth (1775)
- Part of the American Revolutionary War
Date	December 5, 1775
Location	Yarmouth, Nova Scotia
Result	American victory

Belligerents
Massachusetts Bay Privateers	Great Britain

Strength
2 armed schooners (80 men each)	Local militia

The Raid on Yarmouth took place on 5 December 1775 during the American Revolutionary War. The raid involved American Privateers from Salem, Massachusetts attacking Yarmouth, Nova Scotia at Cape Forchu. The privateers intended to stop the export of supplies being sent from Nova Scotia to the loyalists in Boston.

== Background ==
During the American Revolution, Americans regularly attacked Nova Scotia by land and sea. American privateers devastated the maritime economy by raiding many of the coastal communities, such as the numerous raids on Liverpool and on Annapolis Royal. Sent to join Captain Jeremiah O'Brien in the Bay of Fundy, five vessels left Salem for Nova Scotia. The schooners took four prizes in the Bay of Fundy and sent three to Salem. Two of the schooners went to Yarmouth. One of these schooners had prisoner Acting-Governor Phillips Callbeck, having been captured in the Raid on Charlottetown (1775).

== Battle ==
On December 5, 1775 at 10:00 in the morning two American Privateers (80 men each) from Salem, each armed with eight Carriage guns and 16 swivels, landed at Yarmouth. The crew had fire locks, pistols and cutlasses. They overwhelmed the local militia and imprisoned all the officers. Under threat of death, the inhabitants of the town watched as the privateers pillaged their town. As a result, 82 inhabitants of Yarmouth signed a petition to Governor Legge to either withdraw to Halifax or New England or be able to remain neutral in the conflict, which was quickly rejected by Richard Bulkeley.

== Aftermath ==
American privateers remained a threat to Nova Scotian ports for the rest of the war. The attacks put an end to the trade relations between Nova Scotia and New England. For example, after a failed attempt to raid Chester, Nova Scotia, American privateers struck again in the Raid on Lunenburg in 1782.

== See also ==
- American Revolution - Nova Scotia theatre
- Military history of Nova Scotia
