= USS Lynch (1776) =

History

United States
- Name: USS Lynch
- Namesake: Thomas Lynch
- Owner: Colonel John Lee of Marblehead, Massachusetts
- Ordered: by General George Washington
- Builder: not known
- Laid down: date unknown
- Acquired: 26 January 1776
- Commissioned: 1 February 1776 at Manchester, New Hampshire
- Decommissioned: (captured by the British 19 May 1777)
- Refit: Beverly, Massachusetts
- Captured: by HMS Foudroyant 19 May 1777
- Fate: taken to Plymouth, England, 23 May 1777 by the British

General characteristics
- Type: schooner
- Tonnage: not known
- Length: not known
- Beam: not known
- Draft: not known
- Propulsion: sail
- Complement: not known
- Armament: two 4-pounder guns; two 2-pounder guns; four swivel guns

USS Lynch was a 6-gun schooner of the Continental Navy. She served for over a year on the New England coast, interfering with British maritime trade when possible. In 1777 she was assigned dispatch boat duty and, after delivering her secret dispatches to France, set sail for the United States with French secret dispatches. The British captured her, but not before she could destroy the French dispatches.

== Chartered by order of Washington ==
The first ship to be so named by the Navy, Lynch, a fishing schooner chartered by order of General George Washington 26 January 1776 from Col. John Lee of Marblehead, Massachusetts, was commissioned 1 February 1776 at Manchester, Massachusetts, Comdr. John Ayers in command.

== Continental Navy service ==
Lynch eluded fire from HMS Fowey when she sailed 7 February 1776 from Manchester, Massachusetts, to fit out at Beverly, Massachusetts. Shortly after midnight on 2 March, Lynch slipped out of Beverly and dodged Fowey and Nautilus to make her way to rendezvous in Cape Ann Harbor with three other ships in the little American fleet commanded by Commodore John Manley.

On the night of the 4th, Manley's schooners drove off British brig Hope in a spirited engagement. The next day they took their first prize, Susannah, a 300-ton English merchantman laden with coal, cheese, and beer, for General Howe's beleaguered army in Boston, Massachusetts.

After escorting their prize to Portsmouth, Manley's squadron returned to Cape Ann, where on the 10th he captured a second prize, Boston-bound transport Stokesby, a 300-ton ship carrying porter, cheese, vinegar, and hops. Lynch and the others escorted the prize toward Gloucester, Massachusetts, but Stokesby ran hard aground. After much of the prize's cargo had been removed, British brig Hope arrived and put the torch to the hulk.

== Howe evacuates Boston ==
While Manley's squadron was at Gloucester, General Howe evacuated Boston and Washington ordered his ships to dog the British fleet and pounce upon any stragglers. The patriot schooners departed Gloucester 21 March and sighted a merchant brig off Boston Light that afternoon. They chased their prey and by evening were close enough to open fire. Their quarry then hove to, but two English men of war, Savage and Diligent, arrived to compel the American schooners to abandon their prize.

Soon afterwards, Manley divided his fleet, keeping Lynch and Lee with his flagship Hancock. On the afternoon of 2 April they sighted brig Elizabeth. This prize, an American vessel captured by the British the previous October, was full of loot plundered from the warehouses of patriot merchants just before the evacuation of Boston, and carried a goodly number of Tory refugees. Many of the Tories were transferred to Lee, their leaders were taken on board Hancock, and the captive crew was imprisoned in Lynch, which accompanied Hancock to Portsmouth, arriving 4 April to refit and recruit.

Underway again 13 May, Lynch joined Lee and Warren in Cape Ann Harbor. A fortnight later HMS Milford pursued the schooners but they escaped in the fog. On 7 June they captured British transport Anne carrying a light infantry company of the 71st Highland Regiment and some twoscore British tars sent out as fleet replacements. The Highlanders were transferred to Lynch and taken to Plymouth, Massachusetts.

Cruising the New England coast through the summer, on 26 August Lynch and Warren encountered British frigate Liverpool and scurried away in opposite directions. Warren was captured while Lynch escaped and a few days later reached Boston.

Lynch next cruised athwart the transatlantic shipping lanes. On 27 September she ran across a fleet of 120 sail bringing a division of Hessians to reinforce General Howe. Frigate HMS Unicorn peeled off the convoy and chased the schooner. Lynch only managed to escape by jettisoning her guns and water, enabling her to stay out of range until darkness allowed her to slip away. The schooner was laid up after reaching Boston.

== Service as a dispatch boat ==
Late in February 1777 Lynch was reactivated to take important dispatches to France. Under command of Capt. John Adams, she got underway from Boston 3 March and reached Nantes 2 April with valuable intelligence for the American Commissioners at Paris.

== Captured by the British ==
On 19 May, while trying to slip away from the French coast, Lynch, again carrying important secret documents as well as arms and clothing for the American Army, was intercepted by HMS Foudroyant south of Belle-Île, on the western coast of Brittany. Unable to escape, Adams was captured before he could run the schooner aground, but he did manage to sink the dispatches. Foudroyant took her prize to England, arriving Plymouth, England, 23 May.
