= Nicholson Broughton =

American captain (1724–1798)

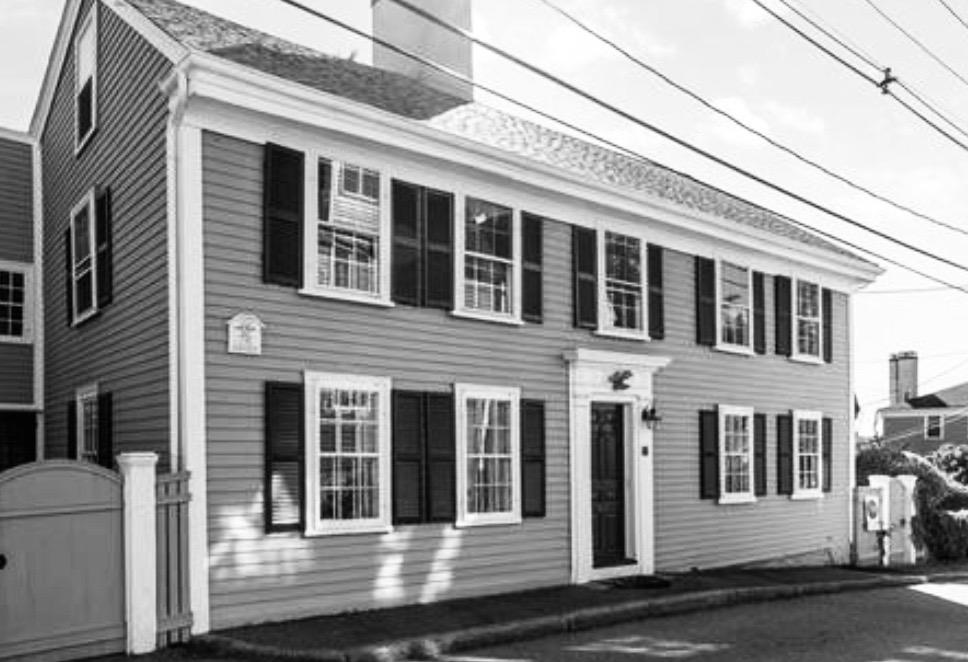
- Captain Nicholson Broughton's Home, 6 Lee Street, Marblehead. Massachusetts
- Born: 1724
- Died: 1798 (aged 73–74)
- Military career
- Allegiance: United States
- Branch: Continental Navy; United States Navy
- Commands: first commodore of the United States Navy
- Conflicts: American Revolutionary War: Raid on Charlottetown

Signature
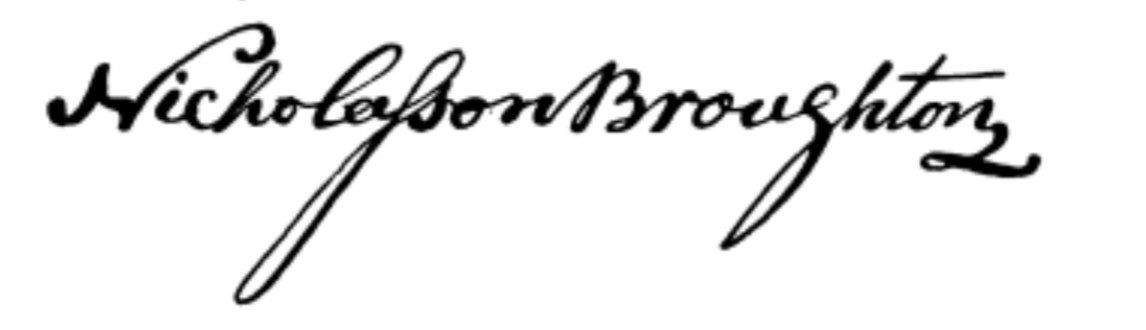

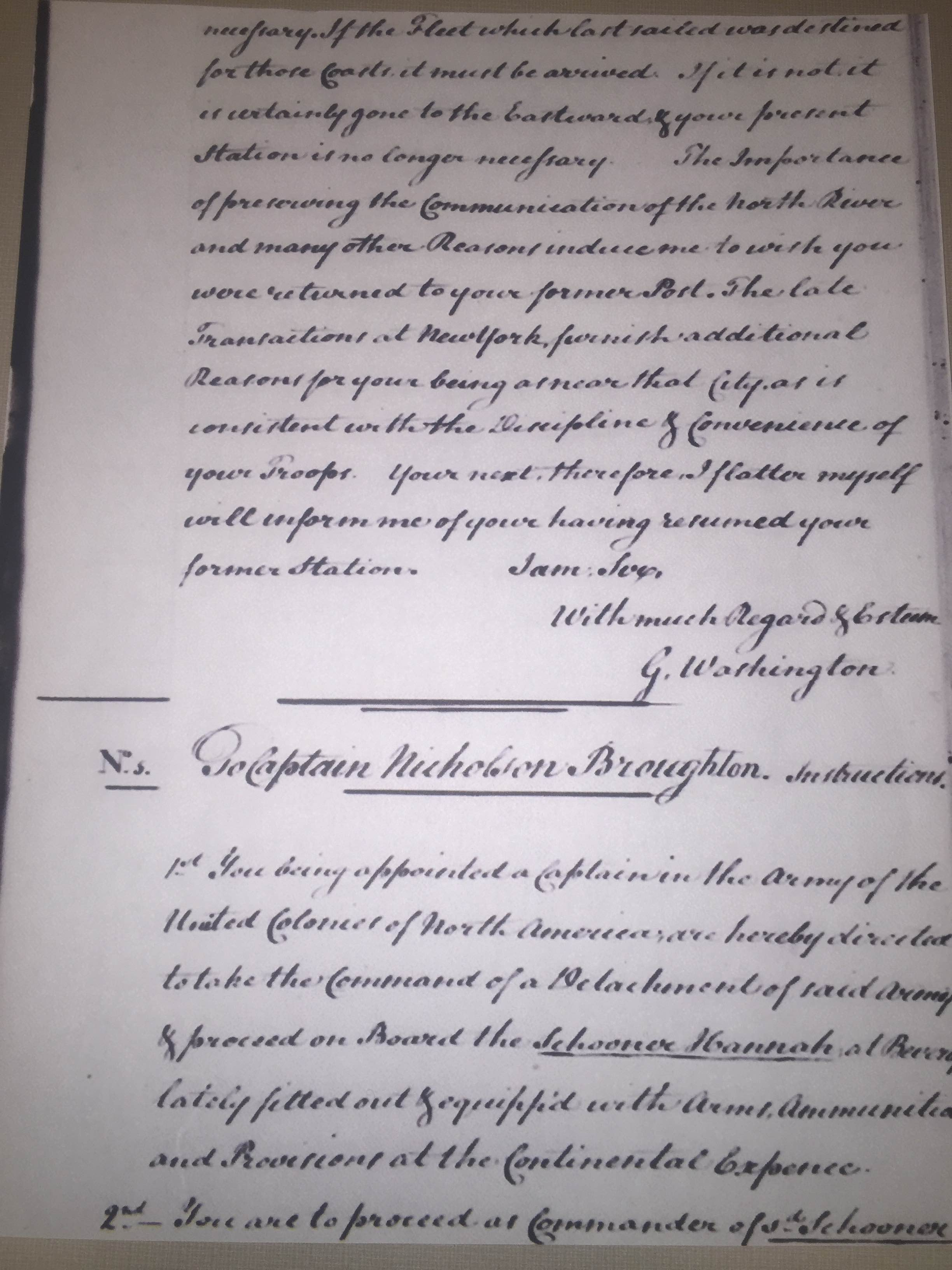
General George Washington's letter to Nicholson Broughton, commissioning him as the first commodore of the American Navy

Coat of Arms of Nicholson Broughton

Captain Nicholson Broughton (1724–1798) of Marblehead, Massachusetts was the first commodore of the American Navy and, as part of the Marblehead Regiment, commanded George Washington’s first naval vessel USS Hannah. Broughton set sail from Beverly, Massachusetts on 5 September 1775 in Hannah. He also led the first American expedition of the war, which went to interrupt shipping British armaments off Nova Scotia. On the expedition, Broughton participated in the Raid on Charlottetown. As a result of Broughton's expedition to Nova Scotia, the Governor of Nova Scotia Francis Legge declared martial law throughout the colony.

== USS Hannah ==
Washington needed a navy to supply ships and troop transports, needing their provisions and military stores. At age 50, and having over two decades of seafaring, Captain Broughton enlisted 24 April 1775 in the Marblehead Regiment (along with Captain Robert Wormsted). Broughton set sail in Hannah out of the harbor of Beverly, Massachusetts on 5 September 1775. HMS Lively tried to catch Broughton but he found protection in the harbor of Gloucester, Massachusetts. The same day Lively captured the American vessel Unity. Two days later, on 7 September, leaving Gloucester Harbor, Broughton re-captured HMS Unity. The crew of Hannah did not get prize money because it was a re-capture. Broughton's crew mutinied. They were arrested and court martialled in Cambridge on September 22.

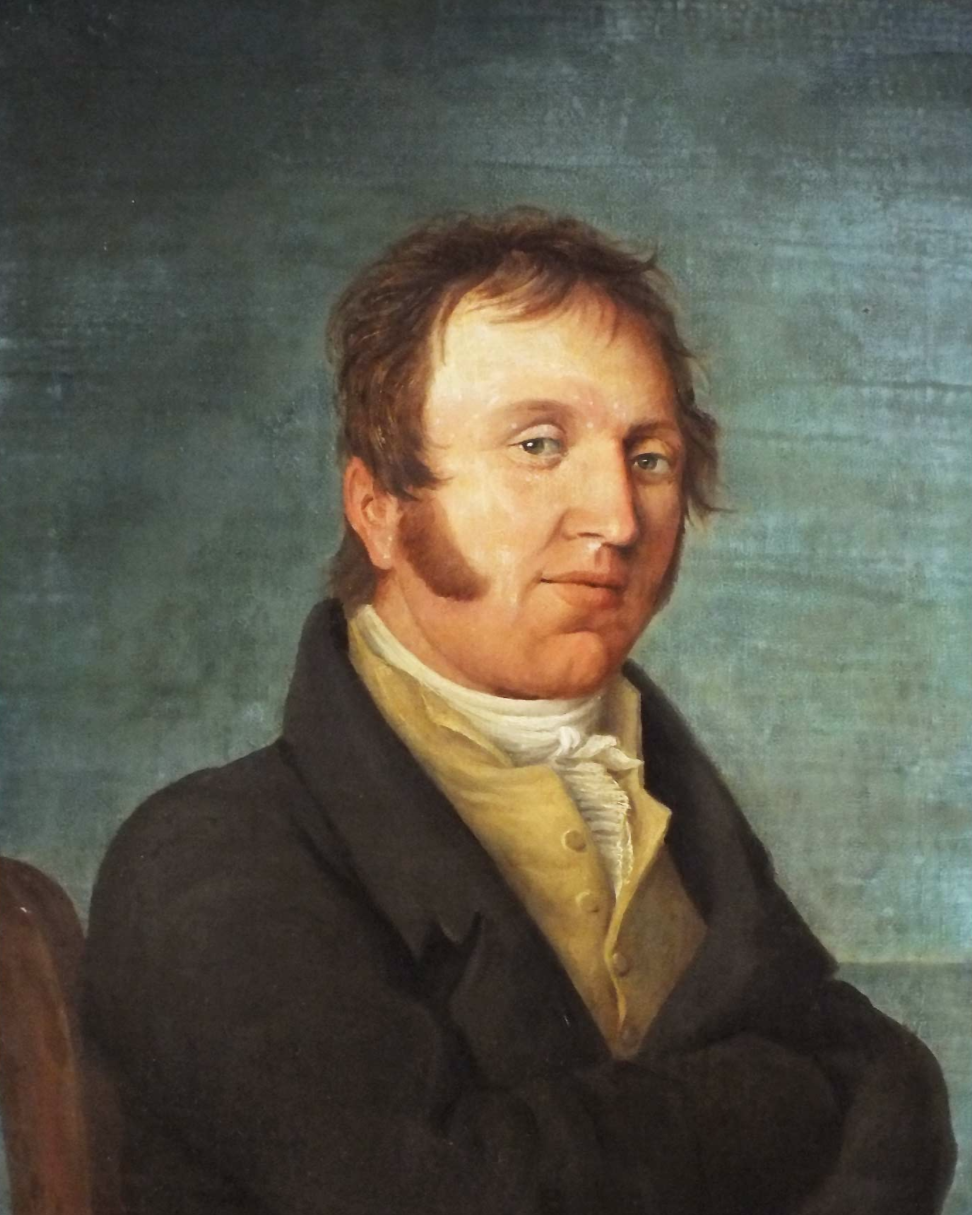
Commodore Nicholson Broughton's son Broughton Jr. (1764–1804), Marblehead, Massachusetts

Hannah was then engaged in the first official naval engagement of the war. On October 10, Admiral Samuel Graves ordered HMS Nautilus (16 guns, 125 men), under the command of Captain John Collins, to hunt down Hannah. Collins pursued Broughton off Marblehead until Broughton escaped by running his ship onto Beverly beach. Nautilus began firing at that ship. The local militia began to return fire. With a receding tide, Nautilus got stuck on the ocean floor for 2.5 hours while under fire. Two men were wounded and the ship suffered severe damage. After 2 months and 21 days, Hannah was also damaged and retired.

== Washington's first naval expedition ==
Washington sent Broughton to lead an expedition off Nova Scotia to interrupt two British ships full of armaments bound for Quebec. Broughton commanded USS Hancock (not the Lynch), joined by Captain John Selman in Frankin (4 guns). Broughton gathered intelligence at Canso, Nova Scotia that the two ships en route to Quebec had already gone to Quebec the month earlier. Broughton and Selman wrote Washington that "we are however something comforted in that no Vessel passes this season to Boston, Halifax or to any part of America from Quebec but must pass within gun Shot of us."

=== Canso ===
Broughton and Selman captured seven British vessels around Canso. On 29 October Broughton captured the schooners Prince William (Capt. William Standley Cr) and Mary (Capt. Thomas Russell). Two days later, Broughton wrote to Washington, that he captured the sloop Phoebe commanded by Captain James Hawkins. The sloop was owned by Boston loyalist Enoch Rust. Broughton indicated that Rust was "contrary … to the Association of the united American Colonies." He also described Loyalist Boston as a "Den of Mischievous Violators of the rights of Humanity." Five days later, on 5 November, Broughton took the sloop Warren owned by Thomas Cochrane of Halifax, Nova Scotia. Warren was commanded by Captain John Denny, who Broughton described as not being in a "a very favorable light respecting their attachment to American Liberties."

=== Charlottetown ===
At Pictou, Broughton heard that the Governor of St. John Island was recruiting for the war efforts against the Americans. As a result, Broughton headed for Charlottetown.

On 17 November, both captains landed with two parties. They took three prominent people: the Acting Governor Phillips Callbeck, the Surveyor General Mr. Thomas Write and Senior naval commander on the Island Captain David Higgins.

They ransacked Callbeck's home, emptied his stores and took the province silver Seal weight 59 ounces and Governor Patterson's Commission. They also broke into plundered Governor Patterson's House.

Broughton also searched for the wives of Callbeck and Higgins, both of whom were daughters of prominent Boston loyalists. Callbeck's wife was the daughter of Nathaniel Coffin Jr., who a few months earlier had ordered the felling of the Liberty Tree on the Boston Common. Higgins wife was the daughter of Job Princes of Boston.

While George Washington censored Broughton and released his prisoners, John Adams supported Broughton stating, "Capt: Broaton [sic] may perhaps deserve censure for going counter to his orders, but I think in justice to ourselves we ought to seize every [Loyalist] officer in the service of Goverment [sic] wherever they may be found."

Afterward, Broughton became 2nd Major in the 5th Essex County Regiment in February 1776 and in December was Major in Colonel Pickering’s regiment, which was ordered to march to Danbury Connecticut. Broughton's home is still standing at 6 Lee Street, Marblehead.

== See also ==
- Nova Scotia in the American Revolution
