= Samuel Tucker (naval officer) =

United States officer (1747–1833)

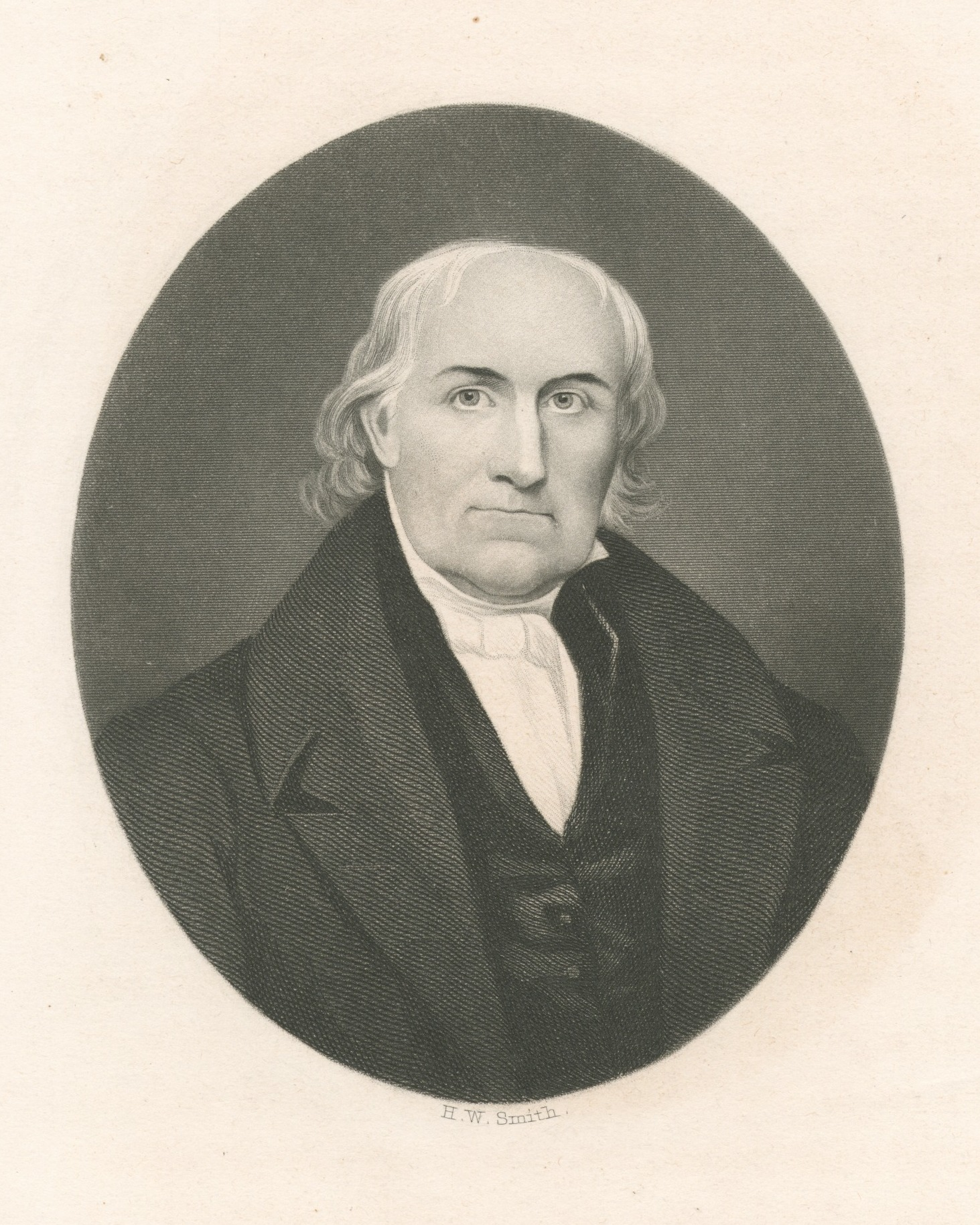
1872 sketch of Tucker

Samuel Tucker (1 November 1747 – 10 March 1833) was an officer in the Continental Navy and the United States Navy.

== Military career ==
Born on 1 November 1747, in Marblehead, Massachusetts, Tucker began his naval career in the spring of 1760 as a cabin boy in the warship, King George. He subsequently rose to command of a merchant ship in July 1774. Tucker was in England at the outbreak of the American Revolutionary War, but returned to Massachusetts in the autumn of 1775.

Upon his return, Tucker was selected by General George Washington to command a small flotilla of armed schooners which Washington had purchased and fitted out to prey on the British shipping. Tucker also served as commanding officer of the schooner Franklin.

In Franklin and later in schooner Hancock, Tucker cruised off the Massachusetts coast, taking many prizes in 1776. His first, taken jointly with the schooner Lee, came on 29 February, when the two Continental ships cornered the 300-ton Henry and Esther, bound for Boston laden with wood from Halifax, Nova Scotia. In April 1776, in Hancock, Tucker sighted two supply brigs making for Boston. Standing in to the harbor, near the protecting cannon of British warships anchored in the roadstead, he soon captured brigs Jane and William, out of Ireland. Tucker took both, escaping with the two ships and their valuable cargoes of foodstuffs and other items needed by the Continental Army.

On 15 March 1777, Capt. Samuel Tucker received a commission in the Continental Navy, signed by John Hancock on the same day. In December 1777 Tucker was chosen as the "best qualified and most deserving” captain for command of the frigate Boston to replace the disgraced Captain Hector McNeill.

On 15 February 1778, Capt. Samuel Tucker sailed from Braintree, Massachusetts, to take onboard John Adams, the newly appointed minister to France, and his son, John Quincy. Later, in remarks before the Navy Board, Tucker would say of Adams, "I did not say much to him at first, but damn and bugger my eyes, I found him after a while as sociable as any Marblehead man."

Halfway across the Atlantic, Boston was nearly dismasted in a lightning storm that injured 20 sailors. According to John Adams' diary, one of the sailors had a hole burnt in the top of his head from the lightning, and soon died "raving mad." On another occasion, three British warships gave chase to the frigate. Avoiding contact with British ships as much as possible, Tucker was finally forced to fight. Encountering the British letter of marque (privateer) Martha, Tucker maneuvered Boston to cross the enemy's "T." Boston's guns thundered and sent shot down the length of the Britisher, and soon Martha, after a single ineffectual broadside, struck her colors. The Adams' arrived safely at Bordeaux on 1 April.

Cruising in European waters from the spring of 1778 until the fall of that year, Tucker took four more prizes before returning to Portsmouth, New Hampshire, on 15 October. In 1779, two cruises in the North Atlantic netted nine prizes before orders sent Boston to Charleston, South Carolina, to help defend that port against the British onslaught.

On 11 May 1780, Charleston surrendered, after a siege, and the warships in harbor were captured, along with most of their officers and men. Tucker was among the prisoners but received parole on 20 May and was exchanged for British Capt. Wardlaw, whom Tucker had captured when Boston took HMS Thorn in September 1779.

On 11 January 1781, Tucker assumed command of Thorn, now a privateer. After taking seven prizes, he was again captured in an engagement with HMS Hind (1740) off the mouth of the St. Lawrence River.

He and his crew were taken to Prince Edward Island. One day, having had permission to go to Halifax, Tucker escaped and made his way to Boston. In an era where chivalry in war was still alive, Tucker wrote a letter of apology to the British garrison commander for his escape. At his own request, Tucker was paroled.

When the war had ended, Tucker received hearty thanks from Congress. During the years following the establishment of peace, the old mariner from Marblehead sailed packets from America to Bremen, Germany, until he retired to farming, in Maine, in 1792.

In the War of 1812, Tucker returned to active service, commanding a schooner which protected the coast of Maine from British privateers. In 1813, he captured the British privateer Crown in a short, sharp engagement.

== Personal life ==
Changing his residence to Massachusetts, Tucker settled down once again to a life of farming. In 1823, he was awarded a small pension, retroactive to 1818.

In 1768, Tucker married Mary Gatchell, daughter of Ann and Samuel Gatchell, a Congregationalist Church Deacon from Marblehead. The Tuckers were married for 63 years until her death. When the Tuckers were living in Boston they "attended the Episcopal Church, of which [his wife] was a communicant. Often in his family would he repeat parts and passages of what he called the beautiful Church Liturgy. His views were serious, and he always spoke with reverence of religion."

Samuel Tucker died on 10 March 1833, aged 86, in Bremen, Maine.

== Namesake ==
Two ships in the United States Navy have been named USS Tucker for him.

== See also ==
- Bibliography of early American naval history
