= USS Washington (1775) =

History

United Colonies
- Name: USS Washington
- Namesake: George Washington
- Owner: George Erving and Capt. Benjamin Wormwell
- Laid down: date unknown
- Christened: as Endeavor
- Acquired: Early October 1775
- In service: November 3, 1775
- Reclassified: from schooner to brigantine
- Captured: December 3, 1775 by Great Britain
- Fate: Rotted away at Boston, Massachusetts

General characteristics
- Type: Brigantine
- Displacement: 160 tons
- Draft: not known
- Propulsion: brigantine sail
- Speed: not known
- Complement: 74
- Armament: Six 6-pounder guns, four 4-pounder guns, and ten swivel guns

USS Washington was a 10-gun brigantine of the Continental Navy. She was acquired during the American Revolution and converted from a schooner to a brigantine. She served for only a short period of time before being captured by the British.

== Acquired by General Washington ==
The first ship to be named Washington by the Navy—while never part of the Continental Navy—was a 160-ton schooner named Endeavor acquired by General George Washington in early October 1775 from George Erving and Capt. Benjamin Wormwell of Plymouth, Massachusetts.

Renamed Washington, the schooner was fitted out at Plymouth, Massachusetts, and was re-rigged as a brigantine at the behest of her prospective commanding officer, a Continental Army officer from Rhode Island, Capt. Sion Martindale. On November 3, 1775, Washington's charter was consummated, and she was authorized to operate off the New England coast between Cape Cod and Cape Ann in the hope of disrupting British shipping.

== Service ==
Washington sailed in company with the schooner Harrison on November 23. No more than three leagues from shore, both Continental ships came across the British frigate HMS Tartar and two forage-laden transports. The British ships scared off and separated and Washington and Harrison chased the ship until well after nightfall. And, although Washington spent most of November 25 looking for Harrison, she did not find her.

Soon thereafter, she captured the provision-laden, 80-ton sloop Britannia and turned her over to Continental authorities before returning to sea on the 28th. However, stormy weather and a poorly disciplined crew caused Washington to head back to port the next day.

== A demoralized crew ==
Back at Plymouth, it was ascertained that some of the men's grumblings had been occasioned by their contention that they had enlisted to serve as soldiers in the army, not as sailors. Moreover, a lack of winter clothing demoralized the crew. They were quickly supplied with suitable winter outfits, and the ship returned to sea on Sunday, December 3, 1775.

== Captured ==
Late the next day, the British 6th rate, 20-gun frigate HMS Fowey, cruising Massachusetts Bay on the lookout for "rebel cruisers," in company with HMS Lively, sighted Washington and gave chase.

Just before nightfall, Fowey reached gun range and fired a warning shot. Seven subsequent rounds brought the brigantine to, and she lowered her colors. Taken to Boston, Massachusetts, Washington, upon inspection by the Royal Navy, was deemed unsuitable for British operations on the high seas.

== Final disposition ==
The brigantine Washington eventually rotted away at Boston.
