= Thomas Wright (surveyor general) =

Thomas Wright (1740–1812) was the surveyor general for Prince Edward Island and a writer. He was taken prisoner during the American Revolution in the Raid on Charlottetown (1775).

In 1763, Wright assisted Captain Samuel Johannes Holland in surveying St. John's Island (which has since been renamed Prince Edward Island). In 1770, Governor Patterson appointed him to the Council. He also became the Surveyor General (1773) and a Supreme Court Judge (1774). The following year he was taken prisoner in the American privateer raid on Charlottetown.
