= Raid on Charlottetown (1775) =

1775 military operation

- Part of the American Revolutionary War
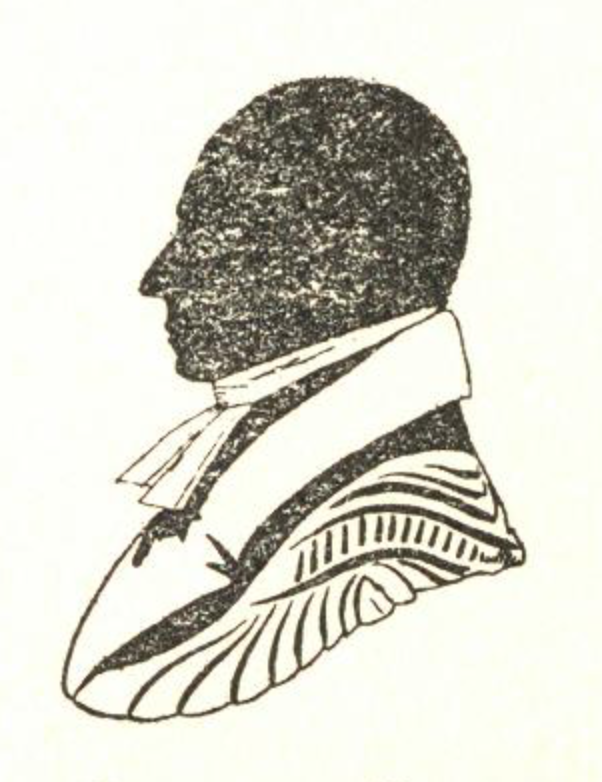
- Rev. Theophilus Desbrisay, taken prisoner
Date	17–18 November 1775
Location	Charlottetown, Prince Edward Island
Result	American victory

Belligerents
(United States) United Colonies	Great Britain

Commanders and leaders
Nicholson Broughton (Hancock); John Selman (Franklin)	(Kingdom of Great Britain) Phillips Callbeck (POW) (Kingdom of Great Britain) Thomas Wright (POW) (Kingdom of Great Britain) Peter Higgins (POW)

Strength
2 brigs	Militia

The Raid on Charlottetown of 17–18 November 1775, early in the American Revolutionary War, involved two American privateers of the Marblehead Regiment attacking and pillaging Charlottetown, Prince Edward Island, then known as St. John's Island. The raid motivated Nova Scotia Governor Francis Legge to declare martial law. Despite the raid's success, George Washington immediately freed senior colonial officials the privateers had brought back as prisoners to Cambridge, Massachusetts.

== Background ==
During the American Revolution, rebels and later French privateers frequently attacked Nova Scotia, damaging its maritime economy by raiding coastal communities including Liverpool and Annapolis Royal.

In October 1775, British forces burned Falmouth, now Portland, Maine. To respond, General Washington commandeered two schooners from John Glover's Marblehead Regiment for privateering. Glover recruited his son-in-law Captain Nicholson Broughton in the Hancock and Captain John Selman (privateer) in the Franklin. They were ordered to intercept two brigs carrying armaments from England arriving in the St. Lawrence River. Instead of following orders into a risky naval battle, the two privateers sought more convenient, easier quarry off Cape Canso, capturing five prizes, vessels laden with fish. The privateers heard that the British were recruiting at St. John's Island and decided to attack it.

Washington sent Selman with Nicholson Broughton to lead an expedition off Nova Scotia to interrupt two British ships full of armaments bound for Quebec. Broughton commanded the USS Hancock, joined by Captain Selman in the Franklin. Selman and Broughton gathered intelligence at Canso, Nova Scotia that the two ships en route to Quebec had already gone to Quebec the month earlier. Broughton and Selman wrote Washington that "we are however something comforted in that no Vessel passes this season to Boston, Halifax or to any part of America from Quebec but must pass within gun Shot of us."

Broughton and Selman captured seven British vessels around Canso. On 29 October Broughton captured the schooners Prince William (Capt. William Standley Cr) and Mary (Capt. Thomas Russell). Two days later, Selam and Broughton wrote to Washington, that he captured the sloop Phoebe commanded by Captain James Hawkins. The sloop was owned by Boston loyalist Enoch Rust. Broughton indicated that Rust was “contrary … to the Association of the united American Colonies.” He also described Loyalist Boston as a “Den of Mischievous Violators of the rights of Humanity.” Five days later, on 5 November, Broughton took the sloop Warren owned by Thomas Cochrane of Halifax, Nova Scotia. The Warren was commanded by Captain John Denny, who Broughton described as not being in “a very favorable light respecting their attachment to American Liberties.”

== Raid ==
Selman and Broughton gathered intelligence that the Governor of St. John Island was recruiting for the war efforts against the Americans and resolved to attack. As a result, Broughton headed for Charlottetown.

On 17 November, both captains landed with two parties of six men each. They took two prisoners, Acting Governor Phillips Callbeck and Surveyor General Thomas Wright, for possible exchange for Patriot American prisoners taken at Quebec. They ransacked Callbeck's home, emptied his stores, took the colony's silver seal and Governor Patterson's Commission, and also plundered Patterson's House.

Selman and Broughton also searched unsuccessfully for the wives of Callbeck and senior naval commander Captain David Higgins, both daughters of prominent Boston loyalists. Callbeck's wife was the daughter of Nathaniel Coffin Jr., who a few months earlier had ordered the felling of the Liberty Tree on the Boston Common. Higgins wife was the daughter of Job Princes of Boston.

Before the privateers left, they spiked the cannons at the fort.

== Aftermath ==
The privateers took more prisoners at Canso: Captain David Higgins was captured in his schooner Lively on Nov. 23 in the Gut of Canso. On board were the Governor's priest Rev. Theophilus Desbrisay and Council member John Russell Spence, who were briefly held but shortly released. Higgins and the two other prisoners were taken to American headquarters in Cambridge, Massachusetts by way of Winter Harbour, Maine. (En route they were involved in the Raid on Yarmouth, Nova Scotia (1775).)

Washington, who wanted colonies to rebel freely rather than by intimidation, censured the privateers for imprisoning government officials without permission and freed them. While George Washington censured Selman and Broughton, John Adams (who was on the committee to establish the navy) supported the privateers stating that they may “deserve censure for going counter to [their] orders, but I think in justice to ourselves we ought to seize every [Loyalist] officer in the service of Government wherever they may be found." When Selman was retired years later, the Vice President of the United States Elbridge Gerry favourably re-evaluated his contribution to the war effort and signed his letter, "with much esteem and respect, E. Gerry."

Callbeck returned and became the Commander for the St. John Volunteers in the Revolutionary War, investing heavily in the island's defences. (The St. John Volunteers were later named Fanning's Corps of Island Saint John's Volunteers and then, in 1799, the Prince Edward Island Fencibles.)

The privateers continued to attack throughout the war and Loyalists were re-routed away from the Island to settle at Louisbourg. In August 1777, 2 privateers invaded Saint Peters and killed livestock.

The privateers pillaged the property of Wellwood Waugh and he was forced to move from Charlottetown to Pictou, Nova Scotia, the following year. (In 1777, Waugh was himself implicated in an American privateer raid on Pictou and was forced to move to Tatamagouche, Nova Scotia. He became a prominent inhabitant and Waugh River is named after him.)

Major Timothy Hierlihy was ordered to be the commander of the defence of Prince Edward Island. (In 1778, Timothy defended the Spanish River coal mines in Cape Breton from American privateers — recapturing two vessels, retrieving loyalist property, killing one of the privateers and sending other prisoners to Halifax. He later established Antigonish, Nova Scotia).

== See also ==
- American Revolution - Nova Scotia theatre
- Military history of Nova Scotia
