= John Selman (privateer) =

American privateer

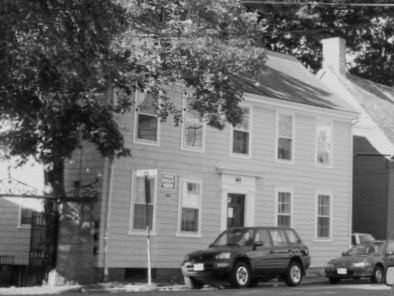
Selman House, 19 Franklin St, Marblehead, Massachusetts

Captain John Selman (1744–1817) was a privateer who served in the Marblehead Regiment and commanded the USS Franklin for George Washington's first expedition of the American Navy, which was ordered to interrupt the shipping of British armaments off Nova Scotia. Selman also participated in the Raid on Charlottetown (1775).

== Washington's First Naval Expedition ==
Washington sent Selman with Nicholson Broughton to lead an expedition off Nova Scotia to interrupt two British ships full of armaments bound for Quebec. Broughton commanded the USS Hancock, joined by Captain Selman in the Franklin. Salem and Broughton gathered intelligence at Canso, Nova Scotia that the two ships en route to Quebec had already gone to Quebec the month earlier. Broughton and Selman wrote Washington that "we are however something comforted in that no Vessel passes this season to Boston, Halifax or to any part of America from Quebec but must pass within gun Shot of us."

=== Canso ===
Broughton and Selman captured seven British vessels around Canso. On 29 October Broughton captured the schooners Prince William (Capt. William Standley Cr) and Mary (Capt. Thomas Russell). Two days later, Selam and Broughton wrote to Washington, that he captured the sloop Phoebe commanded by Captain James Hawkins. The sloop was owned by Boston loyalist Enoch Rust. Broughton indicated that Rust was “contrary … to the Association of the united American Colonies.” He also described Loyalist Boston as a “Den of Mischievous Violators of the rights of Humanity.” Five days later, on 5 November, Broughton took the sloop Warren owned by Thomas Cochrane of Halifax, Nova Scotia. The Warren was commanded by Captain John Denny, who Broughton described as not being in “a very favorable light respecting their attachment to American Liberties.”

=== Charlottetown ===
Selman and Broughton gathered intelligence that the Governor of St. John's Island was recruiting for the war efforts against the Americans. Selman wrote the Vice President of the United States that they were, “supposing we should do essential service by breaking up a nest of [loyalist] recruits.” As a result, Broughton headed for Charlottetown.

On 17 November, both captains landed with two parties of six men each. They took prisoners for possible exchange for Patriot Americans prisoner taken at Quebec. There were three prisoners: the Acting Governor Phillips Callbeck, the Surveyor General Mr. Thomas Write and senior naval commander on the island Captain David Higgins.

They ransacked Callbeck's home, emptied his stores and took the province silver Seal weight 59 ounces and Governor Patterson's Commission. They also broke into plundered Governor Patterson's House.

Selman and Broughton also searched for the wives of Callbeck and Higgins, both of whom were daughters of prominent Boston loyalists. Callbeck's wife was the daughter of Nathaniel Coffin Jr., who a few months earlier had ordered the felling of the Liberty Tree on the Boston Common. Higgins's wife was the daughter of Job Princes of Boston.

Before the privateers left, they spiked the cannons at the fort.

While George Washington censored Selman and Broughton and released their prisoners, John Adams supported the privateers stating that they may “deserve censure for going counter to [their] orders, but I think in justice to ourselves we ought to seize every [Loyalist] officer in the service of goverment [sic] wherever they may be found." When Selman was retired, Vice President of the United States Elbridge Gerry favourably re-evaluated his contribution to the war effort and signed his letter, "with much esteem and respect, E. Gerry."

In 1776, Selman became Captain in Colonel Jonathan Glover's 5th Essex County Regiment. Three years later, he became 1st Major under Colonel Willian Bacon.

In 1806, he became a director of the Marblehead Bank. His house — The Selman House — is still standing near the corner of Selman Street and Franklin Street, both named is his honour.

== See also ==
- Nova Scotia in the American Revolution

== Primary sources ==
- Selman's letter to Vice president of United States. 1813
