= USS Harrison (1761) =

Schooner of the Continental Navy

History

United States
- Name: USS Harrison
- Namesake: Benjamin Harrison V
- Completed: 1761
- Acquired: chartered 22 October 1775
- In service: October 1775

General characteristics
- Class & type: Schooner
- Propulsion: schooner sail
- Armament: 4 × 4-pounder guns

USS Harrison was a 4-gun schooner of the Continental Navy chartered and outfitted by General George Washington during the American Revolutionary War. She was assigned to capture British supply ships as part of Washington's plans for the siege of Boston, Massachusetts, and to provide the Continental Army with whatever goods they carried.

== Service history ==
Harrison, a former fishing schooner built in 1761, and named the Triton was chartered 22 October 1775 as part of the small fleet outfitted by General George Washington to capture much needed supplies and to aid him in the siege of Boston. Under Captain William Colt the ship set sail from Plymouth, Massachusetts, where she had been obtained, on 26 October. Although Harrison was not sturdy or particularly seaworthy. Captain Colt succeeded in capturing two British provision ships 5 November. Continuing her cruise against British shipping, the ship departed again 13 November 1775 and after 'being chased by frigate HMS Tartar on the 23d, brought two more prizes into port 1 December. Harrison remained at Plymouth and was frozen in by ice for a time in January. After making two short unproductive cruises, she was decommissioned.
