= HMS Unity (1728) =

History
- Name: Unity
- Launched: 1728
- Fate: Sold, 20 December 1788

HMS Unity was a British hoy launched in 1728 and sold in 1788.

On 7 September 1775, she was captured by USS Hannah. Unity was the first prize taken by a vessel of the United States Navy.

== Bibliography ==
- Colledge, J. J.; Warlow, Ben & Bush, Steve (2020). Ships of the Royal Navy: The Complete Record of all Fighting Ships of the Royal Navy from the 15th Century to the Present (5th revised and updated ed.). Barnsley, UK: Seaforth Publishing. ISBN 978-1-5267-9327-0.
