= USS Lee (1775) =

History

United States
- Name: USS Lee
- Namesake: Charles Lee
- Acquired: October 1775
- Homeport: Marblehead, Massachusetts
- Fate: Returned to owner, November 1777

General characteristics
- Type: Schooner
- Displacement: 74 long tons (75 t)
- Propulsion: Sails
- Armament: 4 × 4-pounder guns; 2 × 2-pounder guns; 10 × swivels

Service record
- Part of: Continental Navy
- Commanders: John Manley; Daniel Waters; John Skinner

USS Lee was a 6-gun schooner of the Continental Navy during the American Revolutionary War. She was named for General Charles Lee.

== Service history ==
=== 1775 ===
In October 1775, Colonel John Glover, acting for General George Washington, chartered the schooner Two Brothers from Thomas Stevens of Marblehead, Massachusetts, as a replacement for Hannah. Her complement complete, 28 October, Captain John Manley dropped her down with the tide, lay to off Tuck Point, and headed out to sea the next morning.

On 27 November, the vessel, now known as Lee, took her first prize, the 80-ton sloop Polly carrying turnips and Spanish-milled dollars from Halifax, Nova Scotia, to the British troops at Boston, Massachusetts. After sending Polly into Beverly under a prize crew, Lee sailed off Boston, and at dusk the next day gave chase to the 250-ton brig Nancy, then beating her way into Boston. Mistaking Lee for a pilot boat, Nancy laid her sails aback and sent up a string of signal flags. Captain Manley dispatched a boat with carefully picked men, ordering them to conceal their weapons as they rowed to and boarded Nancy. Taken by surprise, the brig surrendered without resistance, providing the Americans with a precious cargo of ordnance and gunpowder. Manley placed a prize crew in Nancy and accompanied her to Beverly.

Early in December, Lee was again giving chase intercepting the 200-ton ship Concord laden with drygoods and coal. After capture, Concord was escorted into Marblehead Harbor. The next month Capt. Daniel Waters relieved Captain Manley.

=== 1776 ===
On 29 January 1776, while operating with Franklin, Lee took the 60-ton sloop Rainbow, carrying wood, potatoes, spruce beer, and meat. The next day the American schooners and their prize were sighted by the British frigate HMS Fowey. After a fast chase, the Americans eluded the frigate and, with their prize, reached safety in Cape Ann Harbor. Lee and Franklin soon slipped out to sea again, taking the 300-ton, Boston-bound brigantine Henry and Esther, carrying military cargo, northeast of Cape Ann on 1 February.

Early in March, Hancock and Lynch joined Lee and Franklin off Cape Ann. On the night of the 4th, the schooners drove off British brig Hope in a spirited engagement. The next day they took Susannah, a 300-ton British merchantman laden with coal, cheeses, and porter for General William Howe's beleaguered army in Boston. After escorting their prize to Portsmouth, New Hampshire, the squadron, commanded by Captain Manley in Lee, returned to Cape Ann, where on the 10th they captured another ship, the 300-ton transport Stokesby, bound for Boston with porter, cheese, vinegar, and hops. En route to Gloucester, the prize ran aground. After much of her cargo had been removed, British brig Hope arrived and put the torch to the hulk.

While Manley's squadron was at Gloucester, General Howe evacuated Boston and General Washington ordered his ships to dog the British Fleet, pouncing on any stragglers. The patriot schooners departed Gloucester, 21 March, and sighted a merchant brig off Boston Light that afternoon. They chased their prey and by evening were close enough to open fire. Their quarry then hove to, but two British men-of-war, Savage and Diligent, arrived to compel the American schooners to abandon their prize.

Soon afterwards, Manley divided his squadron, keeping Lynch and Lee with Hancock. On the afternoon of 2 April, they sighted the brig Elizabeth. This prize, an American vessel captured by the British the previous October, was filled with loot plundered from the warehouses of patriot Bostonian merchants and carried a number of Tory refugees. Many of the Tories were transferred to Lee, while their leaders were taken on board Hancock, and the captive crew imprisoned in Lynch, which accompanied Hancock into Portsmouth.

On 13 May, Lee, operating with Warren off Cape Ann, was joined by Lynch. A fortnight later HMS Milford pursued the schooners, but they escaped in fog. On 7 June, they captured the British transport Anne, carrying a light infantry company of the 71st Regiment and some forty sailors sent out as fleet replacements. Sixty of the Highlanders were transferred to Lynch and taken to Plymouth, the remainder and the sailors were divided between Lee and Warren, which then escorted Anne toward Marblehead, outrunning the British frigate Milford to safety.

Lee next cruised alone off Nova Scotia without success until recapturing Betsy, after that sloop had fallen prey to Milford in Massachusetts Bay. Lee scored again in early November by taking the brig Elizabeth, escorting her into Boston on the 7th. While Lee was in port, Captain Waters left the ship to journey to Philadelphia, Pennsylvania as a Member of Congress. He was succeeded by Capt. John Skinner.

=== 1777 ===
Early in the spring of 1777, Lee was again underway from Boston. She took the schooner Hawke, 13 April, captured the fishing sloop Betsy, 3 May, and, a week later, caught the Irish brigantine Charles. The latter, laden with fish, was recaptured en route to Boston under a prize crew. Soon the brigantines Capelin and Industry were added to the list of prizes and escorted to Casco Bay to be libeled. Lee then continued on to Boston, arriving 25 June.

Meanwhile, the ranks of the Continental Navy were being thinned by captures. When Lynch struck her colors on 19 May 1777, Lee was the only schooner of the little fleet left in operation. She pushed out into the Atlantic, 24 July. On 29 August she caught the brig Industrious Bee and sent her into Boston. The next day, she took the snow Lively, but that prize was recaptured by the frigate Diamond, 23 September. Lee next turned south and took her final prize, the brigantine Dolphin, before returning to Marblehead, 26 October 1777. A few days later, she was returned to her owner.
