= USS Warren (1775) =

History

United States
- Name: Warren
- Namesake: Dr. Joseph Warren (1741–1775), doctor and soldier killed at the Battle of Bunker Hill
- Commissioned: Late October 1775
- Captured: By the Royal Navy, 26 August 1776
- Fate: Wrecked, late December 1776
- Notes: Originally fishing vessel Hawk

General characteristics
- Type: Schooner
- Tonnage: 64
- Propulsion: Sails
- Sail plan: Schooner-rigged
- Complement: 50
- Armament: 4 × 4-pounder guns; 10 × swivel guns

USS Warren was a 4-gun schooner of the Continental Navy from 1775 to 1776. She was named for patriot Joseph Warren, who had been killed at the Battle of Bunker Hill.

Warren was originally the fishing schooner Hawk, probably built at Marblehead, Massachusetts, and owned by John Twisdon at the time of her appraisal for naval service in the American Revolutionary War by Colonel Jonathan Glover and Edward Fettyplace on 12 October 1775. Hurriedly fitted out as the fourth vessel of the fledgling seagoing force assembled by General George Washington to intercept British supply ships bound for Boston, Massachusetts, Warren was commissioned at Beverly, Massachusetts, late in October 1775. Under the command of Captain Winborn Adams, the armed schooner sailed from Beverly on 31 October 1775, on her maiden voyage under Continental colors.

Warren cruised north of Cape Ann, Massachusetts, and captured a small wooden schooner before bagging a Boston-bound supply ship, the schooner Rainbow, around 27 November 1775.

Warren continued to cruise north of Cape Ann until she came across the brig Sally on 24 December 1775. Bound from Lisbon, Portugal, to New York City with 153 quarter casks of wine, Sally had been captured by the fifth-rate HMS Niger earlier in the month, placed under a prize crew, and ordered taken to Boston. Warren captured Sally and took her into Marblehead as a "Christmas present" for General Washington.

After returning to port and undergoing repairs into January 1776, Warren was placed under the command of William Burke. She set sail from Boston on 25 March 1776 to intercept a convoy of transports but was frustrated by the weather in her attempt to pick off any strays while sailing in company with the Continental 6-gun schooner Franklin. The schooners then sailed their separate ways, with Warren going to the familiar waters north of Cape Ann.

After another rent and recruiting new crewmen, Warren joined schooners Lynch and Lee in an attempt to get to sea on 27 May 1776, but that day they could not slip past the British 28-gun frigate HMS Milford patrolling outside Cape Ann harbor. When Warren did manage to get to sea, she scoured the waters of the bay near Cape Ann but did not score any successes that summer. In June 1776, she tangled with the British troopship Unity, bound for Halifax, Nova Scotia, with Hessian troops embarked, but met with a hot reception from the troopers' carriage guns and musket fire. While Warren was disengaging, some powder stored on her quarterdeck exploded, killing three and wounding seven.

Returning to Beverly for repairs, Warren, still under the luckless Burke, put to sea again in late August 1776 to patrol the supply lanes between Nova Scotia and Boston. Before dawn on 26 August 1776, Warren and Lynch encountered the British 28-gun frigate HMS Liverpool patrolling. The two schooners separated to flee, and Liverpool chose to follow Warren.

The ensuing engagement was one-sided, and Liverpool had little difficulty forcing Warren to strike her colors before noon. Burke and his crew were transferred to Liverpool, which kept Warren as a tender until 4 September 1776. On that day, Liverpool rendezvoused with Milford off Cape Ann, transferred Warren's guns to Milford, and sent Warren to Halifax.

Condemned by a British prize court, Warren subsequently served as a tender to Milford until Warren ran aground in a storm near Portsmouth, New Hampshire, and was wrecked in late December 1776.

== See also ==
- List of ships captured in the 18th century
