= Phillips Callbeck =

Canadian politician

- Born: 1744; England
- Died: February 21, 1790 (aged 45–46); Charlottetown, Prince Edward Island
- Occupations: Merchant, lawyer, politician

Phillips Callbeck (c. 1744 – 21 February 1790) was a merchant, lawyer, and political figure in St. John's Island (now Prince Edward Island). He was the attorney general of St. John's Island from 1775 to 1780.

Callbeck is likely to have been born in England. He attended law school in Ireland at King's Inns. He arrived on St. John's Island around 1770 and was named to the first legislative council by Governor Walter Patterson. He was named attorney general and probate judge in the same year. He also operated a mill and owned a store. Callbeck married Ann Coffin in 1772.

During the American Revolutionary War, Callbeck was taken prisoner by privateers from New England in the Raid on Charlottetown, shortly after being named colonial administrator during Patterson's absence. He was released and returned to the island by May 1776. After Patterson's return, Callbeck supported the seizure and sale of several townships for arrears. Callbeck ran unsuccessfully for a seat in the provincial assembly in 1784. In 1788, he was named speaker for the assembly. After criminal charges were brought against Patterson in London, Callbeck was removed from office in 1789. He died in Charlottetown on 21 February 1790.

His grandson Henry Callbeck later served in the provincial assembly. Catherine Callbeck who served as the premier of Prince Edward Island and as a member of the Senate of Canada is a direct descendant of Phillips Callbeck.
