= John Manley (naval officer) =

American revolutionary war officer (c. 1733–1793)

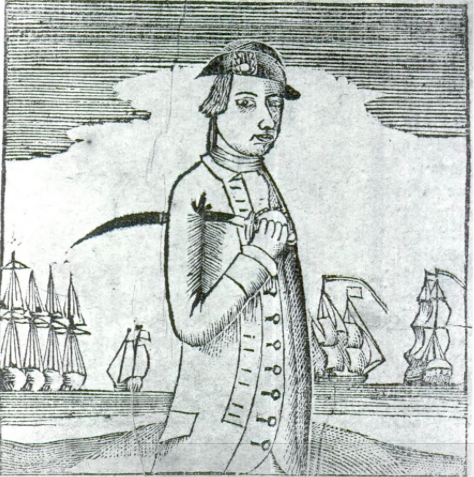
Wood block portrait of Manley

Commodore John Manley (c. 1733 – February 12, 1793) was a Continental Navy officer who served in the American Revolutionary War. Manley was appointed commodore of "George Washington's fleet."

== Early life ==
Tradition holds that John Manley was born in 1733 near Torquay, Devon. As a young man, he settled in Marblehead, Province of Massachusett Bay, eventually becoming the captain of a merchant vessel there. For reasons apparently lost to history, Manley went by the name of John Russell during his time spent in Marblehead, where he married Martha Russell (née Hickman) on September 27, 1764, and by whom he had at least two sons and three daughters. According to his descendants, the reason for two different last names is because he was the illegitimate child of his mother Elizabeth Manley and the Duke of Bedford whose last name was Russell. Outside of Marblehead, John continued to use the surname Manley. All of the sources place Manley in Boston by 1775 after his services were enlisted for the nascent Continental Navy.

== Military service ==
Manley was appointed captain of the schooner Lee by George Washington on 17 October 1775. He assumed command on 24 October 1775 with a crew of 50 men from John Glover's Marblehead Regiment, and on 9 November, Manley sailed from Marblehead flying the new pine tree flag from the main truck. Sources differ as to Manley's first prize, either recapturing a small Continental schooner or capturing the British sloop Polly, but on 28 November, he captured one of the most valuable prizes of the American Revolutionary War—the British brigantine Nancy was carrying much ordnance and military stores for British troops in Boston that proved invaluable to George Washington's army. While not the first British vessel to surrender to the continental fleet, Nancy was perhaps the first capture of significant consequence, leading John Adams to later remark "I assert that the first American flag was hoisted by John Manley, and the first British flag was struck to him". Through the end of 1775, Manley captured several additional prizes carrying cargoes of food, rum, coal, dry goods, all badly needed by the Continental forces.

In January 1776, for his "great vigilance and industry," Manley was appointed commodore of "George Washington's fleet", a group of small armed ships fitted out by him to harass the British and to seize supply vessels. The fleet was led by two frigates, Hancock and Boston. On May 21, 1777 Manley's ships evaded the British blockade of the town of Boston and set sail for Newfoundland. A large British fleet was at anchor in nearby New York, but there was no pursuit as all British vessels were engaged in supporting troops stationed on shore. On June 7, Manley's ships encountered and captured the 28-gun frigate HMS Fox in a brief engagement off the Grand Banks. Three weeks later they turned for the New England coast, in the hope of finding further British targets.

By early July, Manley's fleet had made landfall off Nova Scotia. On July 7 they were discovered by a small force of two British frigates and a brig, who opened fire. After a running battle lasting 39 hours, the British succeeded in capturing both Hancock and Boston, and retaking Fox. Manley and his crew were imprisoned in New York until March 1778. Upon his release, Manley entered privateer service to command Marlborough, Cumberland, and a prize, Jason, until 1782, except for two more periods of imprisonment, one for two years in Mill Prison, England. His privateer ship Jason was a small ship of 18 guns owned by Mungo Mackay and others. In November 1779, the ship fell in with the frigate Surprise of 28 guns and 18 were killed and 12 wounded on Jason, while 7 killed and several were wounded on the Surprise.

On 11 September 1782, he returned to the Navy with command of frigate Hague. On a West Indies voyage, he escaped from a superior British naval force and, in January 1783, took the last significant American prize of the war, Baille. Regarded as one of the outstanding captains of the Continental Navy, he had captured 10 prizes singlehandedly and participated in the capture of five others. Manley died in Boston, Massachusetts on February 12, 1793.

== Namesakes ==
Three ships have been named USS Manley for him.

== See also ==
- Bibliography of early United States naval history
