= USS Hancock (1775) =

History

United States
- Name: USS Hancock
- Namesake: John Hancock
- Acquired: October 1775
- Fate: Returned to owner, 1777

General characteristics
- Type: Schooner
- Tons burthen: 72 (bm)
- Length: 60 ft (18.3 m)
- Beam: 20 ft (6.1 m)
- Propulsion: Sails
- Complement: 70 officers and enlisted
- Armament: 6 × 4-pounder guns

Service record
- Part of: Continental Navy
- Commanders: Nicholson Broughton; John Manley; Samuel Tucker; John Sellers

USS Hancock was a 6-gun schooner of the Continental Navy. She was named for patriot and presiding officer of the Continental Congress, John Hancock. Congress returned her to her owner in 1777 after deeming the vessel to be unsuitable for the Continental Navy.

== Career ==
Hancock was the former schooner Speedwell, owned by a merchant, Mr. Thomas Grant, of Marblehead, Massachusetts. In October 1775, Grant offered the use of his ship for a small fleet being fitted out to prey upon British supply ships and support General George Washington's siege of Boston, Massachusetts. This fleet, the first under Continental pay and control, came to be called "George Washington's Navy."

In October 1775, Hancock (not the Lynch), under the command of Nicholson Broughton, and her sister ship Franklin were ordered to intercept two British brigs as they arrived in the St. Lawrence River from England. But the two schooners instead sought easier quarry off Cape Canso where five prizes of dubious legality were taken. They also raided Charlottetown without regard to orders to respect Canadian property. The story of their illegal actions reached General Washington; he had both Broughton and the captain of Franklin expelled from the navy and returned the captured ships and their cargoes with the proper apologies.

On 1 January 1776, Captain John Manley of the Continental Army was appointed Commodore of the Fleet and chose Hancock to serve as his flagship. She captured two enemy transports on 25 January 1776, fending off an 8-gun British schooner in a brisk engagement while Manley's prize crews were able to sail the captured ships into the safety of Plymouth Harbor.

On 30 January 1776, the 14-gun British brig HMS Hope, which had sailed from Boston for the express purpose of either capturing or sinking Hancock, intercepted her off Plymouth. Manley ran Hancock ashore where it became impossible for Hope, with her deeper draft, to continue the pursuit. The Americans later refloated Hancock and she went on to capture several more prizes in joint operations with the squadron by April 1776, when Captain Samuel Tucker relieved Commodore Manley and assumed command of Hancock. Manley was transferred to the Continental Navy where he commanded the newly built USS Hancock.

Hancock's last recorded action was the capture of two brigs off the coast of Boston on 7 May 1776. She continued to cruise under Tucker until declared unfit for service late in 1776. She was released back into her owner's custody early the following year; the ultimate fate of Hancock is unknown.

== See also ==
- List of historical schooners
