= USS Franklin (1775) =

History

United States
- Name: USS Franklin
- Acquired: 1775
- Fate: Returned to owner, 1776

General characteristics
- Type: Schooner
- Displacement: 60 long tons (61 t)
- Armament: 6 guns

USS Franklin was a 6-gun schooner of the Continental Navy. She was named for Benjamin Franklin. Franklin was originally a Marblehead fishing vessel fitted out by order of Colonel George Washington in 1775. She was part of the fleet of schooners under Commodore John Manley that captured numerous British vessels.

In October 1775, Hancock and Franklin were ordered to intercept two brigs as they arrived in the St. Lawrence River from England. But the two schooners instead sought easier quarry off Cape Canso where five prizes of dubious legality were taken. They also raided Charlottetown settlement without regard to orders to respect Canadian property. The story of their illegal actions reached General Washington who dismissed both ship commanders and returned their prizes to Canadian owners with apologies.

On May 17, 1776, commanded by Capt. James Mugford, the Franklin surprised and captured the British ordnance ship, Hope, which was headed to Nantasket Roads in Boston Harbor carrying 1,500 barrels of gunpowder, 1,000 carbines and other material. Mugford ran Hope to shore at or near Boston to offload the cargo, which was badly needed by the Continental Army. Then, on May 19, Franklin set sail again in company with a privateer, Lady Washington under Captain Cunningham.

With the tide against them, Mugford anchored for the night near Nantasket, Massachusetts. At daybreak thirteen launches from the British fleet approached. The Americans managed to sink two launches on approach, then, in close combat in which Mugford was killed by a musket ball, the Franklin was run ashore to set up defenses, after which the launches were repelled. Mugford, the only American killed in the engagement, was taken ashore and buried in Marblehead, Massachusetts. Franklin was returned to her original owner later in 1776.
