= Gallwey =

Gallwey may refer to:

== People ==
- Henry Galway (Henry Gallwey before 1911), British Army officer and Governor of South Australia
- Peter Gallwey, English Jesuit priest and writer
- Timothy Gallwey, American tennis coach and writer
- Ralph Payne-Gallwey, British soldier and writer

== Payne-Gallwey baronets ==
- Frankland-Payne-Gallwey baronets
- William Payne-Gallwey (disambiguation)
  - Sir William Payne-Gallwey, 1st Baronet
  - Sir William Payne-Gallwey, 2nd Baronet

== Places ==
- Gallwey, South Australia, a former town

== See also ==
- Ferriman–Gallwey score
