= Hector McNeill =

Hector McNeill (10 October 1728 – 25 December 1785) was an Irish-born American sea captain and naval officer. Born in County Antrim, he emigrated to the Province of Massachusetts Bay. He later became the third ranking officer in the Continental Navy during the American Revolutionary War.

== Early life ==
McNeill was born in County Antrim, Ireland on 10 October 1728, to Malcolm and Mary (née Stuart) McNeill, who were Scottish migrants to Ulster. At the age of nine, he emigrated with his parents to Boston in the Province of Massachusetts Bay, arriving there on 7 September 1737. He received his education in the Boston Public Schools. On 12 November 1750, he married Mary Wilson in the First Presbyterian Church. Their first son was named Robert, born 12 April 1752, who died in September the following year. In November their next son, Hector Jr. was born. Two other daughter were born soon after.

== Seven Years War ==
McNeil joined the British merchant navy in April 1755 and was given command of a ship that took Robert Monckton to Nova Scotia where he remained during the siege of Beausejour. He returned to Boston in October that same year. At year's end, just before the beginning of the Seven Years' War he was commanding a vessel that was captured by Indians allied with the French in Passamaquoddy Bay and taken north to Quebec as a prisoner. After a prisoner exchange he was able to acquire another ship and worked in the New England coastal trade.

== Post war ==
After the war, he continued sailing a number of merchant ships between Quebec and Boston, including the sloop Phenix with a large number of passengers in April 1765 and the sloop Fanny and Jeany in November 1766. He also commanded the sloop Brittania and Swallow in 1767 and 1768 respectively.

McNeill's first wife, Mary Wilson, died on 7 February 1769, and is buried in the Granary Burying Ground. He remarried on 26 December 1770, to Mary Watt with whom he shared a daughter, Sarah.

== Beginning of American Revolution ==
Before the beginning of the American Revolution, McNeill was living in British-held Quebec. When war began Governor-General Guy Carleton demanded he either join the militia for the British or leave the colony. McNeill left and was soon transporting supplies to the American army's invasion of Canada under General Benedict Arnold. McNeill continued in this role for several months until British reinforcements caused the Americans to retreat from Canada.

== Naval service ==
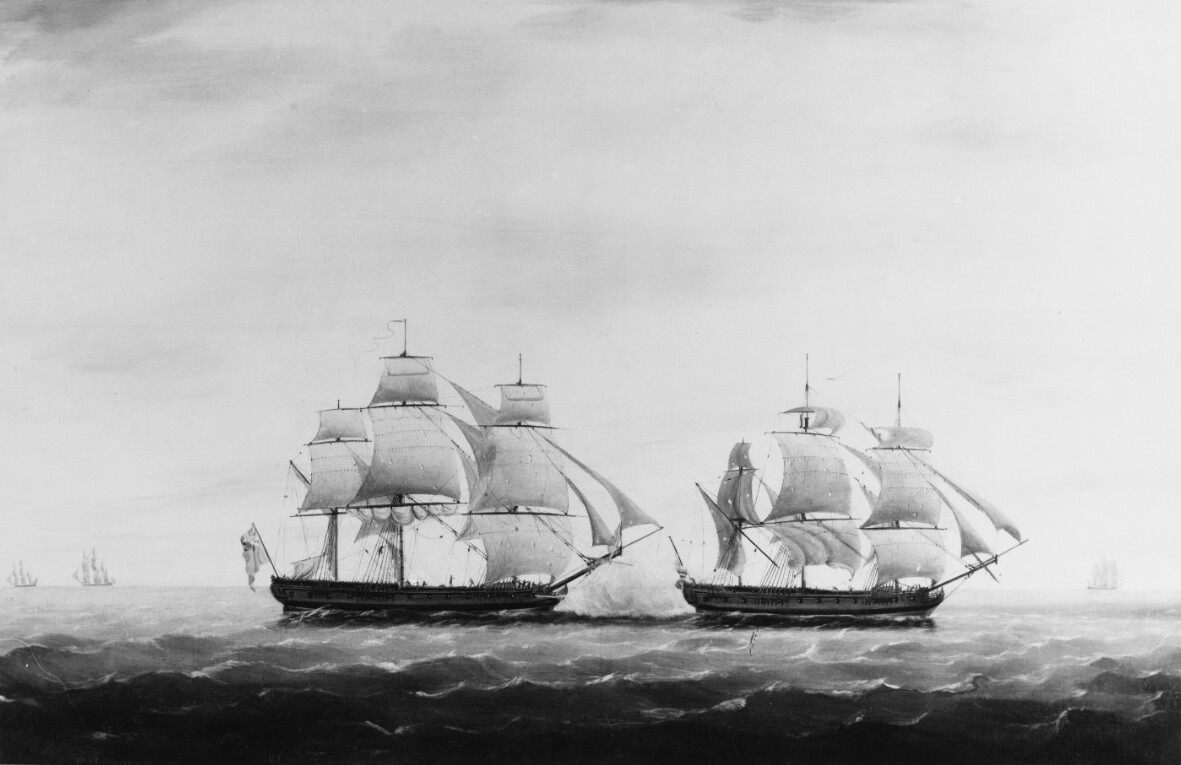
Fox being recaptured by the British (Francis Holman, 1779)

In June 1776, McNeill went before the Continental Congress to lobby for a commission as a Captain in the Continental Navy. He was granted the position on 15 June and installed as its third-ranking captain. He was given command of the new frigate Boston which was outfitted at Newburyport, Massachusetts. After a year preparing the ship to be battle-worthy and finding a crew, the Boston joined another new frigate the Hancock to form a squadron under the command of the Navy's second ranking officer Captain John Manley. Personality conflicts often arose between McNeill and Manley, in part due to the scarcity of supplies and available crew.

On 21 May 1777, the squadron fought in the Grand Banks. On 8 June 1777, they captured HMS Fox. During the 90 minute battle, Manley's ship had done most of the fighting but McNeill was able to position his ship in order to take possession of the British frigate. Manley ordered McNeill to relinquish possession of Fox to his crew, causing further animosity between them.

On 7 July 1777, Manley sailed ahead of the rest of the squadron and encountered Captain George Collier's HMS Rainbow and HMS Flora. Due to disciplined training, the British easily bested the American squadron. Manly would have been able to escape the slower ships, but due to heavy cargo in the forward holds of the Hancock the bow dipped, slowing the craft. After a 39-hour chase, the British captured Hancock and Fox on 9 July. McNeill did not support Manley during his flight, instead withdrawing to the safety of the Sheepscot River, Maine.

McNeill remained in Maine for a month, while criticism of his leadership continued to grow. After a prisoner exchange released Manley, both men were court-martialed with the result for McNeill being dismissal from the Navy without ceremony. For the rest of the war he acted as a privateer for Massachusetts, commanding the Pallas and Adventure.

== Final years ==
After the war, McNeill returned to the merchant marine and was lost at sea on 25 December 1785.

== Note ==
Captain Hector McNeill should not be confused with British Loyalist Colonel Hector McNeill who with Col. David Fanning co-led a surprise attack on American forces under Governor Thomas Burke at Hillsboro, North Carolina on 12 September 1781. An American counter-attack under General John Butler inflicted losses on the Loyalists including the death of McNeill and causing them to abandon Burke and their other prisoners.

== Sources ==
- Allen, Gardner Weld (1922). Captain Hector McNeill of the Continental navy. Massachusetts Historical Society, Boston (Original printing Harvard University Press). p. 108. (Note: From the proceedings of the Massachusetts Historical Society for November, 1921)
- Fredriksen, John C. (2006). Revolutionary War Almanac. New York, NY: Facts on File, Inc.
- Paullin, Charles Oscar (1906). The navy of the American Revolution: its administration, its policy and its achievements. The Burrows Brothers Co. / Republican Printing Co., Iowa. p. 549. Url
