= William Payne-Gallwey =

William Payne-Gallwey may refer to:

- Sir William Payne-Gallwey, 1st Baronet (1759–1831), British general and governor of the Leeward Islands
- Sir William Payne-Gallwey, 2nd Baronet (1807–1881), English Conservative Party member of parliament for Thirsk, son of the above
- William Payne-Gallwey (cricketer) (1881–1914), Irish cricketer and British Army officer, grandson of the above
