= Sir Albemarle Bertie, 1st Baronet =

Royal Navy Admiral (1755–1824)

Admiral Sir Albemarle Bertie Bt KCB
- Born: 20 January 1755
- Died: 24 February 1824 (aged 69); Donnington, Berkshire
- Military career
- Allegiance: United Kingdom
- Branch: Royal Navy
- Service years: 1760s–1812
- Rank: Admiral
- Commands: HMS Crocodile; HMS Nymphe; HMS Latona; HMS Thunderer; HMS Renown; HMS Windsor; HMS Malta; Cape of Good Hope Station
- Conflicts: American Revolutionary War; First Battle of Ushant; Loss of HMS Fox; French Revolutionary Wars; Glorious First of June; Napoleonic Wars; Capture of Mauritius
- Awards: Baronetcy; Knight Commander of the Order of the Bath

Admiral Sir Albemarle Bertie, 1st Baronet, KCB (20 January 1755 – 24 February 1824) was a long-serving and at the time controversial officer of the Royal Navy who saw extensive service in his career, but also courted controversy with several of his actions.

Bertie won recognition for unsuccessfully defending his ship against superior odds in the American Revolutionary War. He was later criticised however for failing to close with the enemy at the Glorious First of June and later superseding a subordinate officer just days before the capture of the French island of Mauritius and taking credit for the victory. Despite these controversies, Bertie was rewarded for his service with a baronetcy and the Order of the Bath, retiring in 1813 to his country estate at Donnington, Berkshire.

== Childhood ==
Albemarle Bertie was born at Swinstead in Lincolnshire in 1755, the natural son of Lord Albemarle Bertie, the brother of Peregrine Bertie, 3rd Duke of Ancaster and Kesteven and Brownlow Bertie, 5th Duke of Ancaster and Kesteven, by Mary Coleback and much of his childhood is undocumented.

== Early naval career ==
It is not clear when he entered the Navy, although he was gazetted lieutenant in December 1777 aged 22, quite a bit older than most of his contemporaries. Within a year of promotion, Bertie had witnessed combat on the repeating frigate Fox at the First Battle of Ushant, a brief and inconclusive action which resulted in a court martial for Admiral Hugh Palliser, a court martial at which Commander Bertie (as he by then was), was called on to give evidence in 1779. The intervening two years had been highly eventful, Bertie spending most of it as a prisoner of war in France after Fox had been taken by the larger French Junon on 11 September 1778.

== American Revolutionary War ==
Following his exchange and appearance as a witness, Bertie spent two years without a ship, due to the shortage of available positions for young officers during the American Revolutionary War. On 21 March 1782, after a change of government, Bertie was reinstated and made captain of the 24-gun frigate Crocodile stationed in the Channel, serving in her until June. He remained on half-pay throughout the 1780s, marrying Emma Heywood, daughter of James Modyford Heywood of Maristow House in Devon on 1 July 1783, and having four children: Lyndsey James, Catherine Brownlow, Emma and Louisa Frances. His wife Emma predeceased him, dying in March 1805. He briefly commanded the frigate Nymphe between October and December 1787.

== French Revolutionary and Napoleonic Wars ==
In 1790 at the Spanish armament, Bertie gained command of the frigate Latona before progressing to captain of a ship of the line, Edgar in 1792, in which he assisted at the capture of the French privateer Le Général Dumourier, and her prize St. Iago, having on board more than two million dollars, besides valuable cargo worth between two and three hundred thousand pounds. The following year he took command of Thunderer in Lord Howe's Channel Fleet. With Thunderer and Howe, Bertie participated in the Atlantic campaign of May 1794 and the culminating Glorious First of June. Howe omitted Bertie from his dispatches of the battle and Bertie was not awarded a commemorative medal like many of the other captains. His failure to close with the French fleet was later cited against him.

For the next ten years Bertie remained with the Channel Fleet on uneventful blockade duty, serving under Sir John Borlase Warren and commanding Thunderer, Renown, Windsor and Malta on this duty. On 23 April 1804, Bertie was promoted to rear-admiral, climbing the ranks over the next three years until he was senior enough to become admiral in charge of the Cape of Good Hope Station off South Africa, being promoted to vice-admiral on 28 April 1808. He served off South Africa for the next two years, suddenly sailing in late 1810 to take over the operations to invade Mauritius and seize it from the French. Most of the fighting had already been concluded by Admiral William O'Bryen Drury before Bertie's arrival and Drury was furious at Bertie's behaviour, writing several strong letters to the Admiralty in protest.

Bertie returned to Britain in 1811 and endured a brief political storm over his actions at Mauritius, which had been criticised by his fellow senior officer on the island, Lord Minto. Angered, Bertie requested court martial to defend his conduct but was firmly refused by the Admiralty, which did not wish for another scandal. A change of government the following year changed the political situation however and Bertie was returned to favour and presented with a baronetcy on 8 December 1812 as reward for the capture of Mauritius, Drury having died in the meantime.

== Retirement ==
Retiring to his country estate at Donnington in Berkshire, Bertie continued to be promoted post-retirement, becoming a full admiral on 4 June 1814. He was also made a Knight Commander of the Order of the Bath on the restructuring of the orders of knighthood, on 2 January 1815. He died in 1824 after ten years' retirement, and his title was inherited by his only son Sir Lyndsey James Bertie, 2nd Bt., then a lieutenant in the 12th Regiment of Dragoons. Although sources do explicitly state that his son succeeded to the Baronetcy, Lieutenant Bertie appears to have died at Waterloo in July 1815, and is not mentioned in the will of Admiral Bertie, drafted in August 1815.

== Bibliography ==
- Howarth, Stephan. "Bertie, Sir Albemarle". Oxford Dictionary of National Biography (online ed.). Oxford University Press. doi:10.1093/ref:odnb/2272. (Subscription, Wikipedia Library access or UK public library membership required.)
- Marshall, John (1823). Royal Naval Biography : or Memoirs of the services of all the flag-officers, superannuated rear-admirals, retired-captains, post-captains and commanders, whose names appeared on the Admiralty list of sea officers at the commencement of the year 1760, or who have since been promoted; illustrated by a series of historical and explanatory notes. With copious addenda. Vol. I. London: Longman, Rees, Orme, Brown, and Green.

Military offices
Preceded by Josias Rowley	Commander-in-Chief, Cape of Good Hope Station; 1808–1810	Succeeded by Robert Stopford
Baronetage of the United Kingdom
New creation	Baronet (of the Navy); 1812–1824	Succeeded by Lyndsey James Bertie
Preceded by Congreve baronets	Bertie baronets of the Navy; 8 December 1812	Succeeded by Payne baronets
