= 1779 =

1779 in various calendars
- Gregorian calendar: 1779; MDCCLXXIX
- Ab urbe condita: 2532
- Armenian calendar: 1228; ԹՎ ՌՄԻԸ
- Assyrian calendar: 6529
- Balinese saka calendar: 1700–1701
- Bengali calendar: 1185–1186
- Berber calendar: 2729
- British Regnal year: 19 Geo. 3 – 20 Geo. 3
- Buddhist calendar: 2323
- Burmese calendar: 1141
- Byzantine calendar: 7287–7288
- Chinese calendar: 戊戌年 (Earth Dog); 4476 or 4269 — to — 己亥年 (Earth Pig); 4477 or 4270
- Coptic calendar: 1495–1496
- Discordian calendar: 2945
- Ethiopian calendar: 1771–1772
- Hebrew calendar: 5539–5540
- Hindu calendars
- Vikram Samvat: 1835–1836
- Shaka Samvat: 1700–1701
- Kali Yuga: 4879–4880
- Holocene calendar: 11779
- Igbo calendar: 779–780
- Iranian calendar: 1157–1158
- Islamic calendar: 1192–1193
- Japanese calendar: An'ei 8 (安永８年)
- Javanese calendar: 1704–1705
- Julian calendar: Gregorian minus 11 days
- Korean calendar: 4112
- Minguo calendar: 133 before ROC 民前133年
- Nanakshahi calendar: 311
- Thai solar calendar: 2321–2322
- Tibetan calendar: ས་ཕོ་ཁྱི་ལོ་ (male Earth-Dog); 1905 or 1524 or 752 — to — ས་མོ་ཕག་ལོ་ (female Earth-Boar); 1906 or 1525 or 753

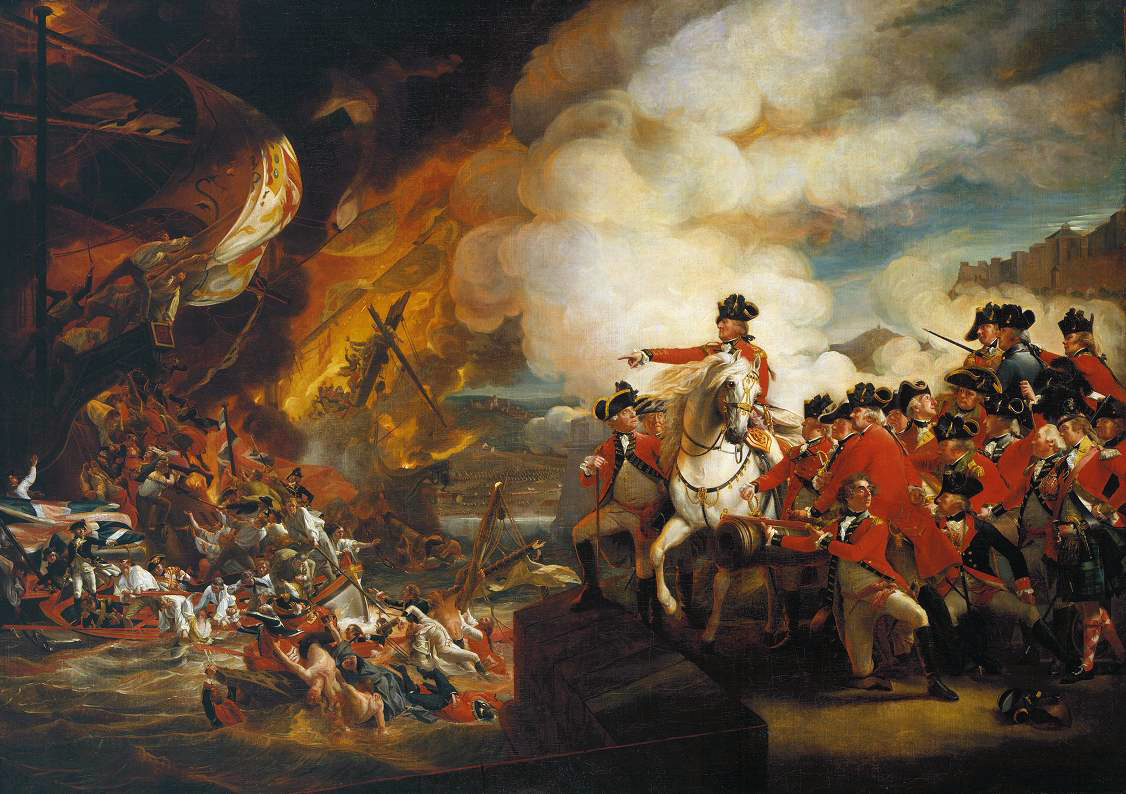
July 16: The Great Siege of Gibraltar begins as Spain attacks the British

1779 (MDCCLXXIX) was a common year starting on Friday of the Gregorian calendar and a common year starting on Tuesday of the Julian calendar, the 1779th year of the Common Era (CE) and Anno Domini (AD) designations, the 779th year of the 2nd millennium, the 79th year of the 18th century, and the 10th and last year of the 1770s decade. As of the start of 1779, the Gregorian calendar was 11 days ahead of the Julian calendar, which remained in localized use until 1923.

== Events ==
=== January–March ===
- January 11
  - British troops surrender to the Marathas in Wadgaon, India, and are forced to return all territories acquired since 1773.
- January 22 – American Revolutionary War – Claudius Smith is hanged at Goshen, Orange County, New York for supposed acts of terrorism upon the people of the surrounding communities.
- January 29 – After a second petition for partition from its residents, the North Carolina General Assembly abolishes Bute County, North Carolina (established 1764) by dividing it and naming the northern portion Warren County (for Revolutionary War hero Joseph Warren), the southern portion Franklin County (for Benjamin Franklin). The General Assembly also establishes Warrenton (also named for Joseph Warren) to be the seat of Warren County, and Louisburg (named for Louis XVI of France) to be the seat of Franklin County.
- February 12 – Lieutenant Colonel Francisco Bouligny arrives with Malagueño colonists at Bayou Teche, to establish the city of New Iberia, Louisiana.
- February 14 – Captain James Cook is killed on the Sandwich Islands, on his third voyage.
- February 15 – John Newton and William Cowper publish the Olney Hymns which includes the hymn Amazing Grace.
- March 1 – Capture and sack of Vientiane by Siamese forces.
- March 10 – The Treaty of Aynalıkavak is signed between Ottoman Turkey and the Russian Empire, regarding the Crimean Khanate.

=== April–June ===
- April 12 – Spain and France secretly sign the Convention of Aranjuez, with Spain joining an alliance against Great Britain in return for France's pledge to recover all Spanish territory lost to the British.
- May 13 – War of the Bavarian Succession – Russian and French mediators at the Congress of Teschen negotiate an end to the war. In the agreement Austria receives a part of the Bavarian territory (the Innviertel), and relinquishes the rest.
- June 1 – American Revolutionary War – Benedict Arnold is court-martialed for malfeasance, in his treatment of government property.
- June 16 – American Revolutionary War – In support of France, Spain declares war on Britain.
- June 21 – King Charles III of Spain issues a declaration of war against Great Britain.

=== July–September ===
- July 16 – The Great Siege of Gibraltar begins. This is an action by French and Spanish forces to wrest control of Gibraltar from the established British garrison. The garrison, led by George Augustus Eliott (later 1st Baron Heathfield of Gibraltar), survives all attacks and a blockade of supplies.
- July 16
  - American Revolutionary War – United States forces, led by General Anthony Wayne, capture Stony Point, New York from British troops.
  - Declaratory Rescript of the Illyrian Nation issued in order to regulate organization of Eastern Orthodox Church in Habsburg monarchy.
- July 20 – Tekle Giyorgis I begins the first of his five reigns as Emperor of Ethiopia.
- July 22 – Battle of Minisink: The Goshen Militia is destroyed by Joseph Brant's forces.
- July 24 – American Revolutionary War – American forces, led by Commodore Dudley Saltonstall, launch the Penobscot Expedition in what is now Castine, Maine, resulting in the worst naval defeat in U.S. history, until surpassed by the attack on Pearl Harbor in 1941.
- August 17 – Action of 17 August 1779: The 64-gun British warship HMS Ardent is captured by France in the English Channel off of Plymouth after an ineffective attempt by the British captain to properly aim its cannons at the French frigate Junon.
- August 23 – Martín de Mayorga, Captain-General of Guatemala, becomes the Spanish Viceroy of New Spain after the death of Antonio María de Bucareli.
- September 14–15 – American Revolutionary War – Little Beard's Town, a loyalist stronghold, is burnt by the Sullivan Expedition.
- September 21 – Battle of Baton Rouge – Spanish troops under Bernardo de Gálvez capture the city from the British.
- September 23 – American Revolutionary War – Battle of Flamborough Head – The American ship Bonhomme Richard, commanded by John Paul Jones, engages the British ship HMS Serapis. The Bonhomme Richard sinks, but the Americans board the Serapis and other vessels, and are victorious.
- September 28 – Samuel Huntington is elected as the seventh President of the Continental Congress.

=== October–December ===
- October 1 – The city of Tampere, Finland (belonging to Sweden at this time) is founded by King Gustav III of Sweden.
- October 4 – The Fort Wilson Riot against James Wilson and others in Philadelphia takes place.
- November 2 – The North Carolina General Assembly carves a new county from Dobbs County, North Carolina and names it Wayne County, in honor of United States General Anthony Wayne.
- December 13 – Vicomte Alexandre de Beauharnais marries Joséphine Tascher.
- December 25 – Fort Nashborough (later to become Nashville, Tennessee) is founded by James Robertson.
- December 31 – Affair of Fielding and Bylandt: Following a brief naval engagement between the British and Dutch off the Isle of Wight, the Dutch merchantmen and naval vessels are captured and taken to Portsmouth, England.

=== Date unknown ===
- Industrial Revolution in England:
  - The Iron Bridge is erected across the River Severn in Shropshire, the world's first bridge built entirely of cast iron. It will open to traffic on January 1, 1781.
  - The spinning mule is perfected by Lancashire inventor Samuel Crompton.
  - Boulton and Watt's Smethwick Engine, now the oldest working engine in the world, is brought into service (May).
- A joint Spanish-Portuguese survey of the Amazon basin begins to determine the boundary between the colonial possessions in South America; it continues until 1795.

== Births ==
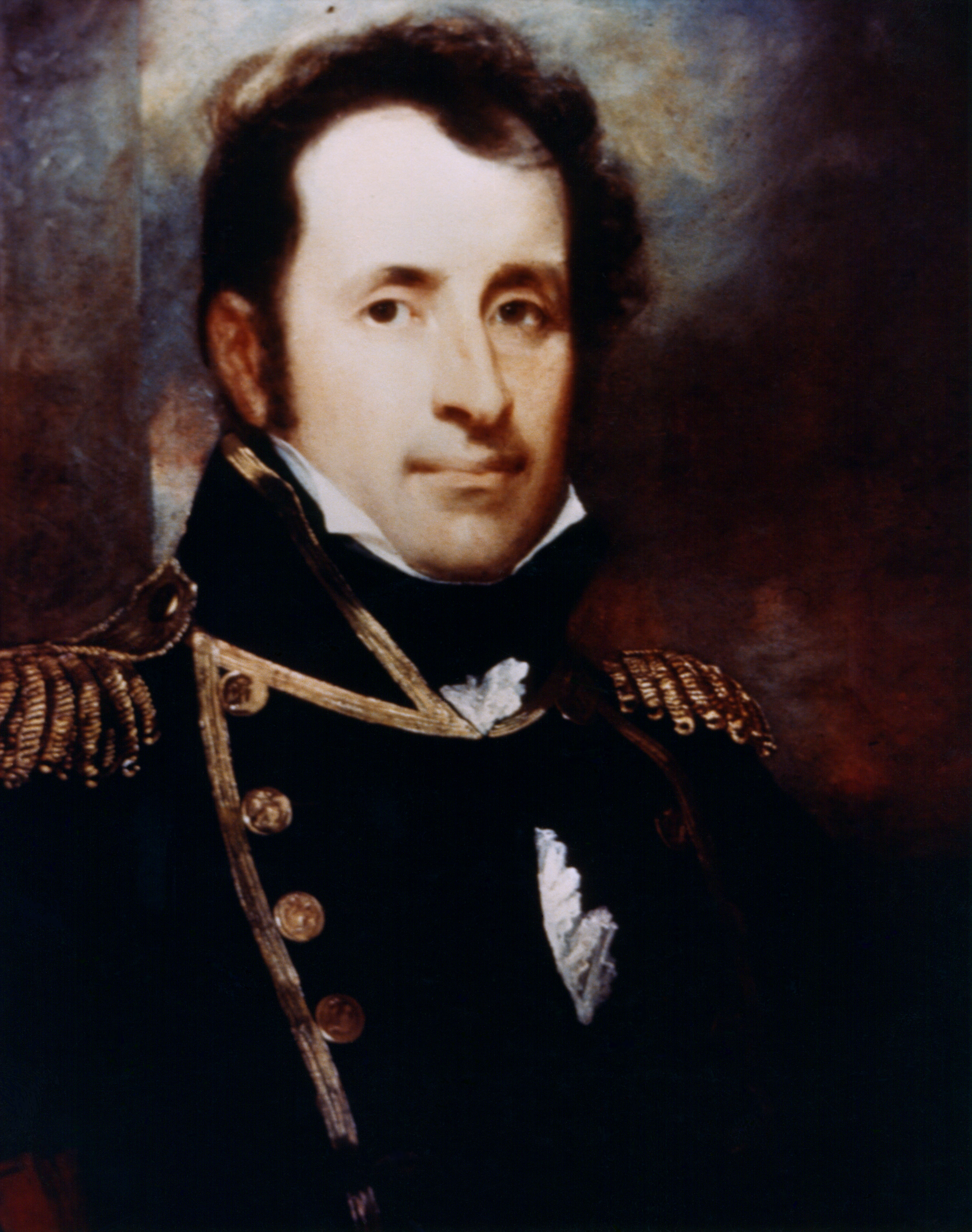
Stephen Decatur

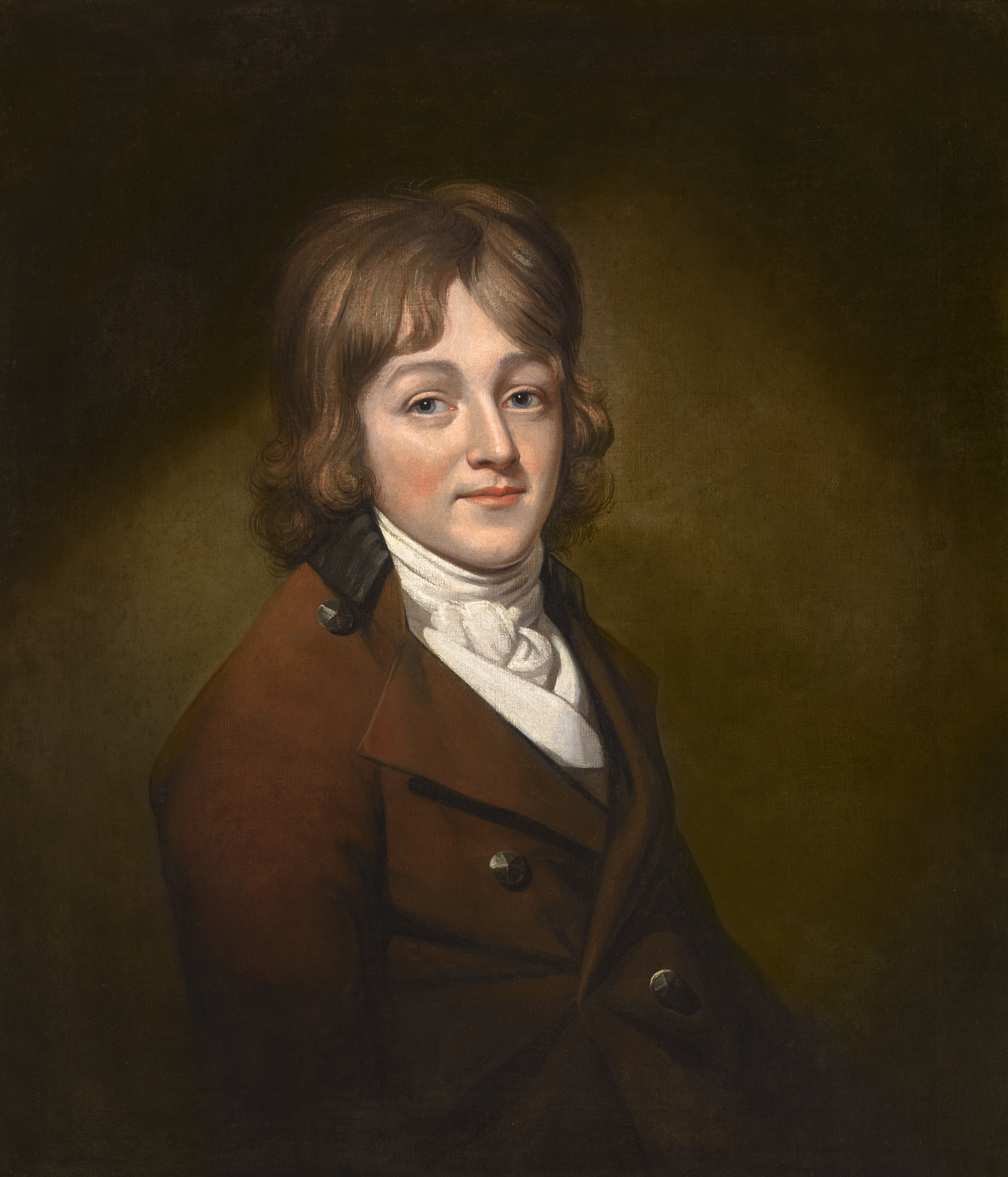
Francis Scott Key

- January 5 – Stephen Decatur, American naval officer (d. 1820)
- January 18 – Peter Mark Roget, British lexicographer (d. 1869)
- February 1 – Nikolaus von Krufft, Austrian composer and civil servant (d. 1818)
- March 6
  - Giovanni Battista Bugatti, Italian executioner (d. 1869)
  - Antoine-Henri Jomini, French general (d. 1869)
- March 15 – William Lamb, 2nd Viscount Melbourne, Prime Minister of the United Kingdom (d. 1848)
- March 21 – José Bernardo de Tagle y Portocarrero, Marquis of Torre Tagle, Peruvian soldier and politician, 2nd President of Peru (d. 1825)
- May 28 – Thomas Moore, Irish poet (d. 1852)
- June 20 – Dorothy Ann Thrupp, British psalmist, hymnwriter, translator (d. 1847)
- July 8 – Giorgio Pullicino, Maltese painter and architect (d. 1851)
- August 1 – Francis Scott Key, American lawyer, lyricist (d. 1843)
- August 8 – Benjamin Silliman, American chemist, educator and abolitionist (d. 1864)
- August 20 – Jöns Jacob Berzelius, Swedish chemist (d. 1848)
- August 29 – Jean-Auguste-Dominique Ingres, French painter (d. 1867)
- September 8 – Mustafa IV, sultan of the Ottoman Empire (d. 1808)
- September 18 – Joseph Story, Associate Justice of the Supreme Court of the United States (d. 1845)
- November 14 – Adam Gottlob Oehlenschläger, Danish poet (d. 1850)
- December 12 – Madeleine Sophie Barat, French Catholic saint, founder of the Society of the Sacred Heart (d. 1865)
- December 24 – George Washington Lafayette
- date unknown – Giacomo Beltrami, Italian explorer (d. 1855)

== Deaths ==
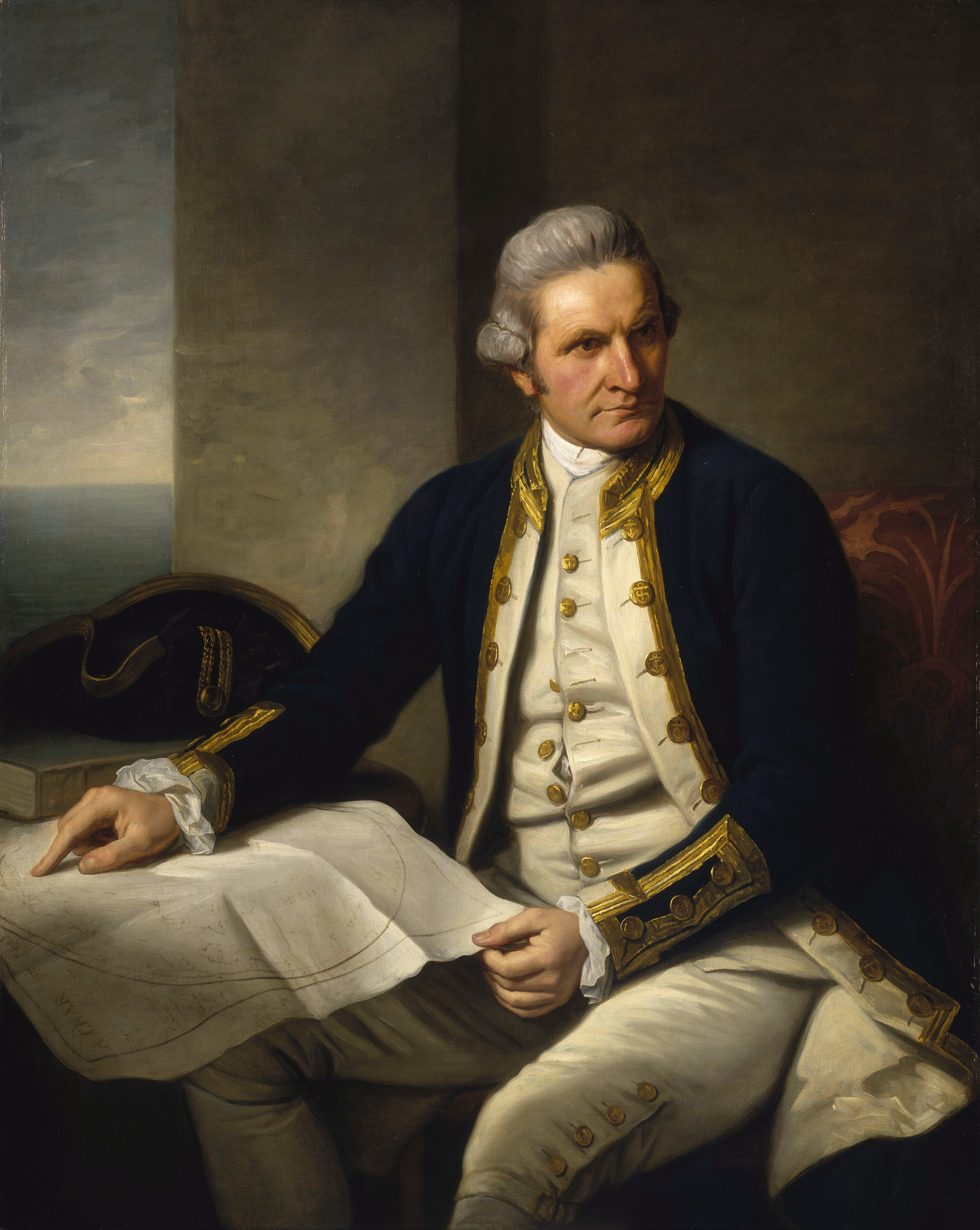
James Cook

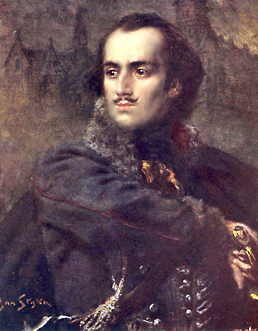
Kazimierz Pułaski

- January 3 – Claude Bourgelat, French veterinary surgeon (b. 1712)
- January 20 – David Garrick, English actor (b. 1717)
- January 22 – Jeremiah Dixon, English surveyor, astronomer (b. 1733)
- February 7 – William Boyce, English composer (b. 1711)
- February 14 – James Cook, British naval captain and explorer (b. 1728)
- February 24 – Paul Daniel Longolius, German encyclopedist (b. 1704)
- April 7 – Martha Ray, British singer and mistress of John Montagu, Earl of Sandwich (murdered) (b. 1742)
- April 9 – Antonio María de Bucareli y Ursúa, Spanish military officer (b. 1717)
- April 24 – Eleazar Wheelock, American founder of Dartmouth College (b. 1711)
- May 1 – Sarah Clayton, English industrialist (b. 1712)
- May 3 – John Winthrop, American astronomer (b. 1714)
- June 7 – William Warburton, English critic, Bishop of Gloucester (b. 1698)
- June 10 – Jane Gomeldon, English writer, poet and adventurer (b. 1720)
- June 16 – Sir Francis Bernard, 1st Baronet, Colonial governor of New Jersey and Massachusetts Bay (b. 1712)
- June 23 – Ras Mikael Sehul, Enderase of Ethiopia (b. 1692)
- June 28 – Martha Daniell Logan, American botanist (b. 1704)
- June 29 – Anton Raphael Mengs, German-Bohemian painter (b. 1728)
- July 21 – Caleb Fleming, English dissenting minister, polemicist (b. 1698)
- August 26 – Henrika Juliana von Liewen, Swedish political salonnière (b. 1709)
- September 12 – Richard Grenville-Temple, 2nd Earl Temple, English politician (b. 1711)
- October 11 – Kazimierz Pułaski, veteran commander of Polish, Russian, and American troops (b. 1745)
- November 16 – Pehr Kalm, Finnish explorer and naturalist (b. 1716)
- December 6 – Jean-Baptiste-Siméon Chardin, French painter (b. 1699)
- December 8 – Nathan Alcock, English physician (b. 1707)
- December 16 – Emperor Go-Momozono of Japan (b. 1758)
- December 17 – Giuseppe Carcani, Italian composer (b. 1703)
- December 23 – Augustus Hervey, 3rd Earl of Bristol, British admiral and politician (b. 1724)

=== unknown date ===
- Giuseppe Bonici, Maltese architect, military engineer (b. 1707)
- Johann Joseph Gassner, German priest (b. 1727)
