= Capture of USS Hancock =

1777 naval battle

- Part of the American Revolutionary War
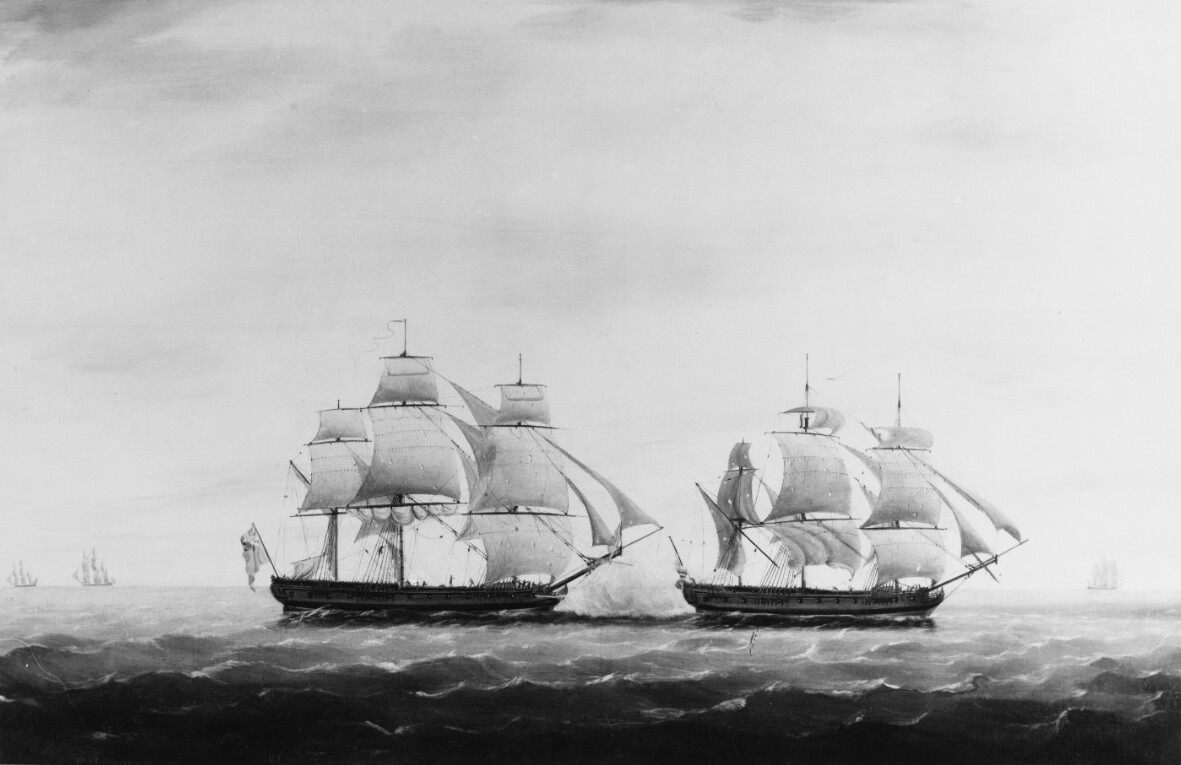
- Painting of Fox being recaptured during the battle by Francis Holman, 1779
Date	8–9 July 1777
Location	Off Halifax, Nova Scotia, Atlantic Ocean
Result	British victory

Belligerents
Great Britain	United States

Commanders and leaders
George Collier	John Manley; Hector McNeill

Strength
2 frigates 1 brig	3 frigates

Casualties and losses
Unknown	2 frigates captured

The American frigate USS Hancock was captured by the British Royal Navy in a 1777 naval battle during the American Revolutionary War. The two highest ranking naval officers of the war battled each other off the coast of Nova Scotia. HMS Rainbow (44 guns), under the command of British Admiral George Collier, captured USS Hancock (34 guns), under the command of Captain John Manley.

== Background ==
During the American Revolutionary War, Americans regularly attacked Nova Scotia by land and sea. American privateers devastated the maritime economy by raiding many of the coastal communities, such as the numerous raids on Liverpool and on Annapolis Royal.

On 7 June USS Hancock and USS Boston engaged the Royal Navy's 28-gun frigate Fox, which tried to outsail her American enemies. Hancock gave chase and soon overhauled Fox, which lost her mainmast and suffered other severe damage in the ensuing duel. About an hour later, Boston joined the battle and compelled Fox to strike her colors.

Hancock spent the next few days repairing the prize and then resumed cruising along the coast of New England. East of Cape Sable, Nova Scotia she took a British coal sloop, which she towed until the next morning when the approach of a British squadron prompted Manley to set the coal sloop ablaze and leave her adrift.

== Battle ==
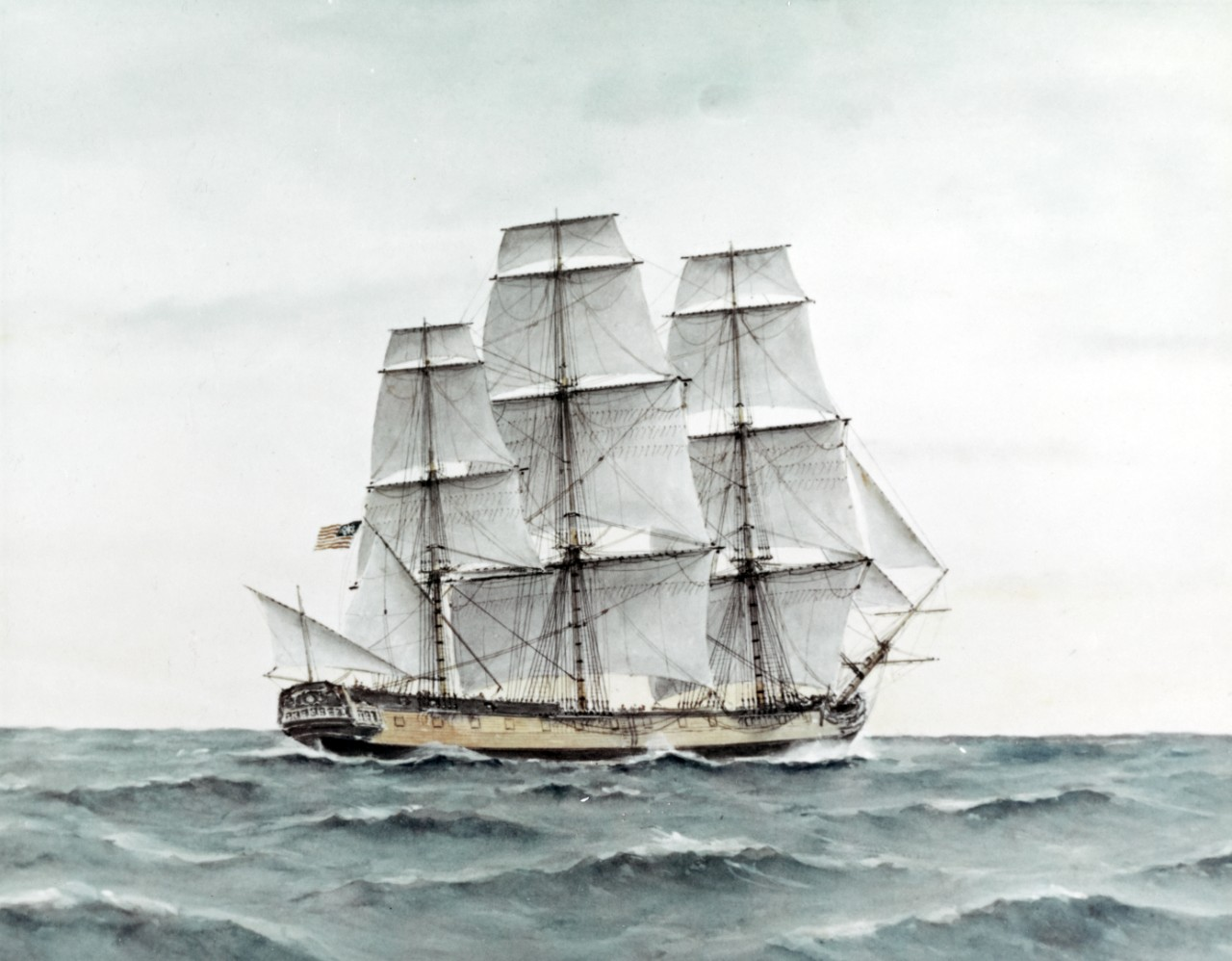
Painting of Hancock by E. Tufnell

On 8 July, Manley was in Hancock accompanied by Boston and Fox when they arrived at the mouth of Halifax Harbour. Collins was in HMS Rainbow (44 guns) accompanied by the frigate HMS Flora (32 guns) and the brig HMS Victor (18 guns) and they chased the American vessels. The American vessels scattered.

Boston, under command of Captain McNeil, easily escaped. When McNeil returned to Boston he was court-martialled for abandoning Manley and dismissed from the Navy. Flora recaptured Fox after a hot action and brought the vessel into Halifax.

Rainbow and Victor gave chase to Hancock. Early in the morning 9 July 1777 the British were within striking distance of Hancock. Rainbow began to score with her bow chasers and followed with a series of broadsides. Hancock was thus finally forced to strike her colors after a chase of some 39 hours. She had 239 men of her crew aboard, 50 some being on Fox. She also had Captain Fotheringham of Fox and 40 of his people on board. The rest were on Boston and a couple of fishing vessels. Collins took the American vessels back to Halifax. The British renamed the American vessel Iris. Manley and his crew were imprisoned for months and then released back to Boston.

== Aftermath ==
American privateers remained a threat to Nova Scotian ports for the rest of the war. For example, after a failed attempt to raid Chester, Nova Scotia, American privateers struck again in the Raid on Lunenburg in 1782.

== See also ==
- American Revolution – Nova Scotia theatre
- Military history of Nova Scotia
