= Action of 11 September 1778 =

- Part of the Anglo-French War (1778–1783)
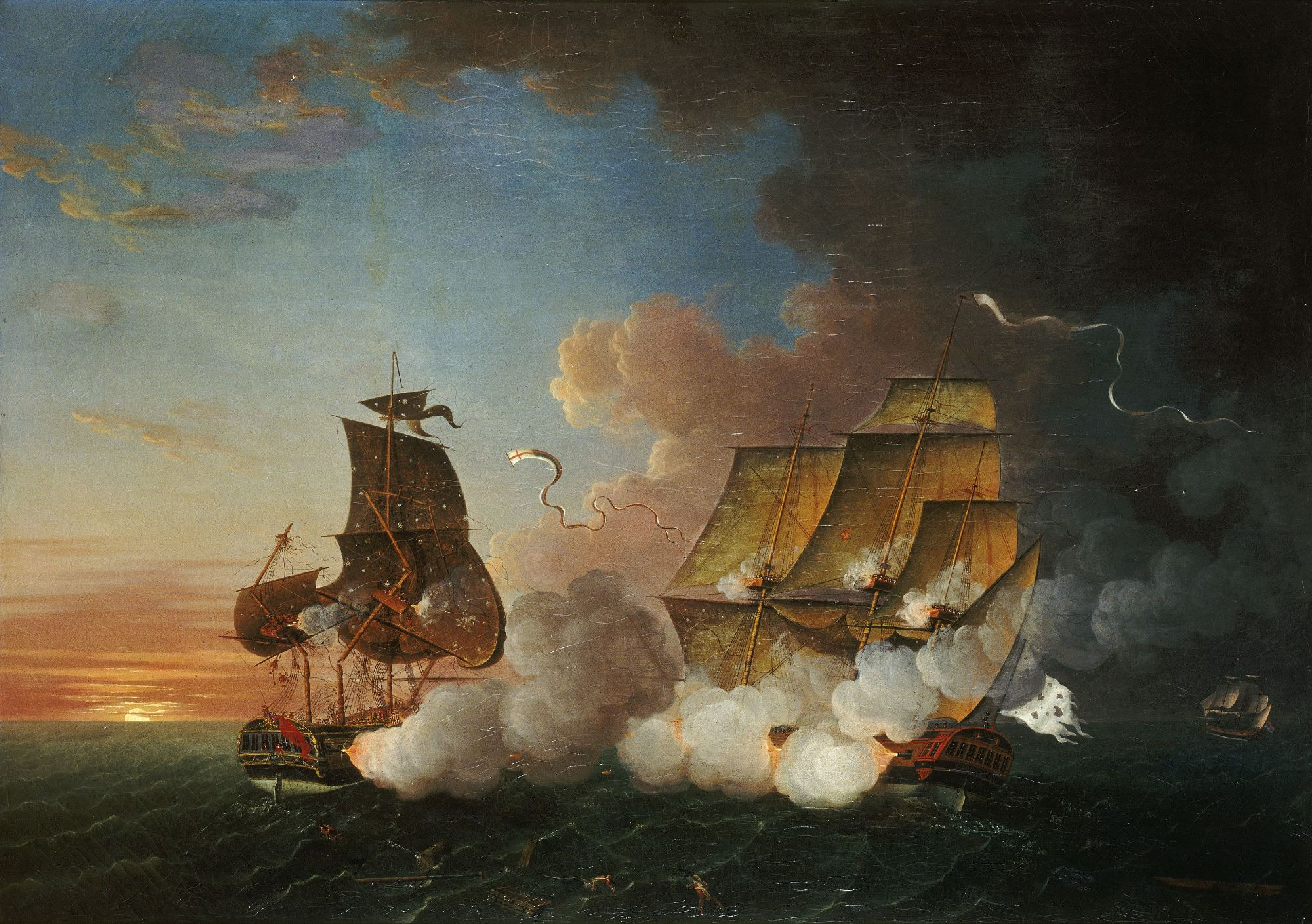
- French frigate Junon against the English frigate Fox in September 1778 by Auguste-Louis de Rossel de Cercy
Date	11 September 1778
Location	off Brest, France
Result	French victory

Belligerents
Great Britain	France

Commanders and leaders
Thomas Windsor (surrendered)	Vicomte de Beaumont

Strength
1 frigate 28 gun	1 frigate 32 gun

Casualties and losses
1 frigate captured 14 killed 32 wounded 154 captured	Unknown

The Action of 11 September 1778 was a minor naval engagement which took place off the French port of Brest during the American War of Independence, between the French frigate Junon and the Royal Navy frigate HMS Fox. During the engagement that followed, Junon outgunned Fox forcing her to strike.

== Events ==
Background

HMS Fox, a twenty eight gun frigate had been under the command of Captain Thomas Windsor, and was sailing off Brest keeping an eye on the French fleet which was then believed to be at sea in the vicinity of Cape Finisterre.

On 11 September 1778, a lookout on Fox sighted two vessels - the latter being the newly commissioned Junon; a 32-gun frigate under the command of Captain Antoine-François de Beaumont, the Vicomte de Beaumont Haunt with a crew of some three hundred and thirty men. Fox gave chase, but the weather made visibility poor and obscured Junon's approach. When Fox finally sighted Junon, Fox prepared to engage.

Action

The two vessels manoeuvred against each other until finally exchanged broadsides at some distance. Junon then tried to obtain a raking position over the Fox, and when this move was thwarted, she attempted to come down from to windward on her opponent's quarter. Junons' heavier firepower at short range soon began to tell.

Junon, unusually for a French vessel, fired at Fox's hull rather than her rigging, with the result that Junon's heavier guns were able to inflict heavy casualties on Fox, and shoot away her three masts. The Fox soon became a dismasted wreck and was unable to manoeuvre. After this the Fox had to withstand the Junons' cannon for three and a half hours. With most of his cannons out of action, Windsor also became seriously wounded by a musket ball in the right arm and had suffered four other minor injuries. He had no choice but to strike her flag.

Aftermath

The Fox had lost 14 men killed and 32 wounded. The French towed Fox into Brest where she was repaired. In January 1779 Windsor was allowed to return to England on parole following the intervention in Paris of William Keppel, who desired both men to appear as witnesses at the court-martial of his brother, Augustus Keppel, conversant with the fall-out from the Battle of Ushant.

The Fox in French service did not last long, for on 22 March 1779 she was driven aground off Brittany with no hope of salvage.

=== Notable participants ===
- Sir Albemarle Bertie, 1st Baronet
