= Frankland-Payne-Gallwey baronets =

Extinct baronetcy in the Baronetage of the United Kingdom

The Payne, later Payne-Gallwey, and from 1967 Frankland-Payne-Gallwey Baronetcy, was a title in the Baronetage of the United Kingdom. It was created on 8 December 1812 for General William Payne, Governor of the Leeward Islands. Payne-Gallwey (as he became) was the half-brother of Ralph Payne, 1st Baron Lavington, who also served as Governor of the Leeward Islands.

The second Baronet was a Magistrate and Deputy Lieutenant for the North Riding of Yorkshire. He was also a Conservative Member of Parliament for Thirsk, (where he resided, at Thirkleby Park), for many years. He married in 1847 Emily Anne, daughter and co-heir of Sir Robert Frankland-Russell, 7th Baronet. They had four sons and three daughters. He was succeeded by the eldest son, Ralph.

The third Baronet, was a Magistrate for the North Riding of Yorkshire, having been educated at Eton. He married, on 25 April 1877, Edith Alice (d. 12 November 1953 aged 98), youngest daughter of Thomas Masters Usborne, J.P., of Blackrock, county Cork, and assumed by Royal Licence, on 4 April 1914, the additional surname and Arms of Frankland. They had one son, William (killed in action 14 September 1914), and four daughters. He was succeeded by his nephew, John.

The fourth Baronet was the eldest son of Captain Edwin John Payne-Gallwey, and nephew of the third Baronet. He served throughout World War I firstly as Major in the 24th Battalion of Northumberland Fusiliers, then as Lieutenant-Colonel (1915) of the Royal Engineers and was recalled in 1940 commanding the Royal Engineers at Aldershot. He was a Magistrate (1922) for the North Riding of Yorkshire. He assumed by Royal Licence, on 25 October 1919, the additional surname of Frankland. He married, on 19 September 1915, Evelyn Florence, younger daughter of James Lee, from Northampton, but they had no issue. His heir was his cousin, Reginald.

The fifth Baronet, an electrical engineer, was the son of Wyndham Harry Payne-Gallwey (d. 1916 - 4th son of the 2nd Bt.). He was educated at Lancing and St. Edmund Hall, Oxford, and served in World War I in the London Electrical Engineers. He married twice: (1) 17 June 1912, Rosetta, daughter of Henry Durdie, from Reading, Berkshire, (she divorced him in 1956), with one daughter, Joan (born 29 January 1914). (2) 28 March 1956, Dorothy Gertrude, widow of Stanley Bathurst and daughter of Bertram Henry Madge, from London, where the fifth Baronet resided. His heir was his cousin, Philip.

The sixth Baronet, the son of Lieutenant Colonel Lowry Philip Payne-Gallwey, OBE, MC, by his spouse Janet (died 1996), daughter of Albert Philip Payne-Gallwey, succeeded his cousin. He was educated at Eton and the Royal Military Academy, Sandhurst, and in 1957 joined the 11th Hussars as a Lieutenant. He was authorised to take the surname of Frankland in addition to and before those of Payne and Gallwey, and to bear the arms of Frankland quartered with those of Payne and Gallwey, by Royal Licence dated 18 July 1967. The following year he became a director of the British Bloodstock Agency plc, in London's Pall Mall, retiring in 1997. On his death, unmarried, on 3 February 2008, the baronetcy expired.

== Payne, later Payne-Gallwey, baronets (1812) ==
- Sir William Payne-Gallwey, 1st Baronet (1759–1831)
- Sir William Payne-Gallwey, 2nd Baronet (1807 – 19 December 1881)
- Sir Ralph William Frankland Payne-Gallwey, 3rd Baronet (19 August 1848 – 24 November 1916)
- Sir John Frankland Payne-Gallwey, 4th Baronet (23 December 1889 – 13 February 1955)
- Sir Reginald Frankland Payne-Gallwey, 5th Baronet (15 April 1889 – 12 January 1964)
- Sir Philip Frankland-Payne-Gallwey, 6th Baronet (15 March 1935 – 3 February 2008). He died leaving no heir.

== Arms ==
Coat of arms of Payne-Gallwey
Crest 1st, A mountain cat passant guardant Proper, gorged with a collar gemelle and charged on the body with a cross-patee, Or (Gallwey); 2nd, A lion's jamb erased, erect Argent, grasping a broken tilting spear Gules (Payne). Escutcheon Quarterly : 1st and 4th, per fesse Or and Gules, in chief an eagle displayed with two heads of the Last, in base a bridge of three arches double towered Argent (Gallwey); 2nd and 3rd: Gules, a fesse between two lions passant Argent (Payne). Motto Potius mori quam foedari (Rather death than dishonour)

Coat of arms of Frankland-Payne-Gallwey
Crest 1st, A cat-a-mountain cat passant guardant Proper, gorged with a collar gemelle and charged on the body with a cross-patee, Or (Gallwey); 2nd, A lion's jamb erased, erect Argent, grasping a broken tilting spear in bend sinister Gules (Payne); 3rd, A dolphin Argent, haurient and entwined round an anchor erect Proper (Frankland). Escutcheon Quarterly, 1st and 4th: per fesse Or and Gules, in chief an eagle displayed with two heads of the Last, in base a bridge of three arches double towered Argent (Gallwey); 2nd: Gules, a fesse between two lions passant Argent (Payne); 3rd: Azure, a dolphin embowed Or, on a chief of the Last two saltires, humettee Gules (Frankland). Motto Malo mori quam foedari (I would rather die than be dishonoured)

== See also ==
- Baron Lavington
- Payne baronets

== Notes ==
Baronetage of the United Kingdom
Preceded by Bertie baronets	Payne-Gallwey baronets 8 December 1812	Succeeded by Russell baronets
