= USS Manley =

Three ships of the United States Navy have been named USS Manley for John Manley.

- USS Manley (TB-23), was a torpedo boat purchased in 1898, served in the Spanish–American War, left active service in 1914, renamed Levant in 1918 and sold in 1920.
- USS Manley (DD-74), was a Caldwell-class destroyer, commissioned in 1917, served in World War I, decommissioned in 1922, recommissioned in 1930, served in World War II and decommissioned in 1945.
- USS Manley (DD-940), was a Forrest Sherman-class destroyer, commissioned in 1957 and decommissioned in 1983.
