= HMS Tweed (1759) =

Frigate of the Royal Navy

History

Great Britain
- Name: HMS Tweed
- Ordered: 26 November 1757
- Builder: Hugh Blaydes, Hull
- Laid down: 19 January 1758
- Launched: 28 April 1759
- Commissioned: 21 June 1759
- Fate: Sold at Woolwich Dockyard on 29 November 1776

General characteristics
- Class & type: 32-gun fifth-rate frigate
- Tons burthen: 65549/94 (bm) (as designed); 66086/94 (bm) (as completed)
- Length: 128 ft 4 1/2 in (39.1 m)
- Beam: 33 ft 11 1/2 in (10.4 m)
- Depth of hold: 10 ft 4 in (3.1 m)
- Propulsion: Sails
- Sail plan: Full-rigged ship
- Complement: 210
- Armament: Upper Deck: 26 × 12-pounder guns; QD: 4 × 6-pounder guns; Fc: 2 × 6-pounder guns

HMS Tweed was a 32-gun sailing frigate of the fifth rate produced for the Royal Navy. She was designed in 1757 by Sir Thomas Slade, based on the lines of the smaller sixth rate HMS Tartar, but with a 10-foot midsection inserted. She was built in Blaydes Yard in Kingston-Upon-Hull.

Tweed was commissioned in April 1759 under Captain William Paston. On 17 October 1760 she gave chase to a 36-gun French frigate, pursuing her for a full day before the French vessel took refuge in the port of Dunkirk. Tweed's slow sailing speed prevented her coming alongside the French vessel, so that combat was limited to the firing of bow chasers which did little damage to the enemy ship. On 15 March 1761 Tweed captured the French privateer Hardi, off Cape Finisterre. Hardi, of Bayonne, was armed with 10 guns and had a crew of 125 men. She had been out 18 days but had not captured anything. Tweed took Hardi into Lisbon and then returned to sea.

In 1763 command passed to Captain Charles Douglas until Tweed paid off into reserve in April 1765. In November 1766 she was recommissioned under Captain Thomas Collingwood. In 1770 command passed to Captain George Collier until the ship paid off into reserve again in 1771.

The design was not considered to be very successful and no further ships of this class were built, while the Tweed herself was sold in 1776 following a survey in 1771 that indicated that she would require repairs taking £3,500 and nine months to complete.
