= George Collier =

Royal Navy officer and politician

Vice-Admiral Sir George Collier
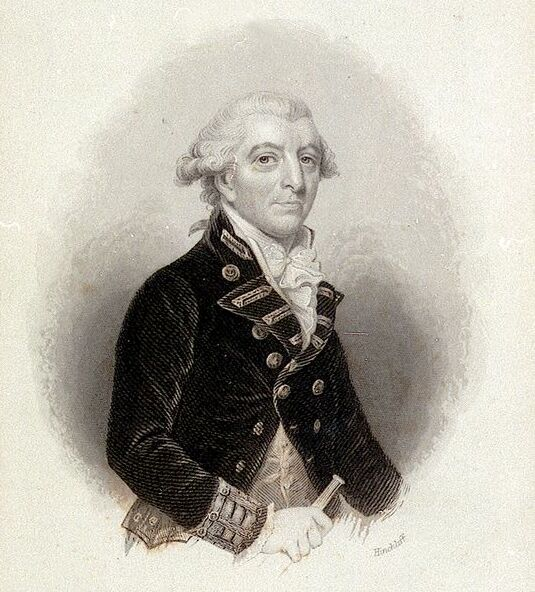
- Born: 11 May 1732; London, England
- Died: 6 April 1795 (aged 56); London, England
- Relatives: Francis Augustus Collier (son)
- Military career
- Allegiance: Great Britain
- Branch: Royal Navy
- Service years: 1751–1795
- Rank: Vice-Admiral of the Blue
- Commands: HMS Boulogne; HMS Edgar; HMS Tweed; HMS Levant; HMS Flora; HMS Rainbow; HMS Canada; HMS St George; Nore Command
- Conflicts: American Revolutionary War; Capture of USS Hancock; Battle of Machias (1777); Chesapeake raid; Penobscot Expedition; Relief of Gibraltar
- Awards: Knight Bachelor

Vice-Admiral of the Blue Sir George Collier (11 May 1732 – 6 April 1795) was a Royal Navy officer and politician who saw service during the Seven Years' War, the American War of Independence and the French Revolutionary Wars. As commander of the fourth-rate ship HMS Rainbow, he was one of the most successful British naval commanders during the opening stages of war with America. He achieved considerable success as one of the senior officers on the North American coast, conducting and organizing several highly effective raids and counter-strikes. He was superseded however, and returned to Britain to play a role in the closing events of the war in European waters, before moving ashore to start a political career. He enjoyed a brief return to service with the resumption of war with France, and achieved flag rank, but died shortly afterwards.

== Early life ==
George Collier was born on 11 May 1732 in Honiton, Devon, elder son of George Collier and Henrietta unknown. He was baptised Francis Lewis George, son of George and Henrietta Collier, on 21 May 1732 in Westminster, London. (See Westminster baptism records). On 9 January 1754 he passed the required examination and was appointed Lieutenant being 'over 21'. (It would appear that the previous erroneous date of birth has been copied and copied until it has been accepted as truth). He was born into a middle-class family and entered the Royal Navy in 1751. He served initially on the Home station, and in the East Indies with Sir George Pocock during the Seven Years' War. He was promoted to commander on 6 August 1761, and then to post-captain on 12 July 1762 with the frigate HMS Boulogne as his first command. With the conclusion of the Treaty of Paris and the end of the Seven Years' War, Boulogne was paid off and Collier was given command of the Plymouth guardship HMS Edgar, where he would remain for the next three years. The command of a series of frigates followed in quick succession, HMS Tweed, HMS Levant and HMS Flora.

== American War of Independence ==
With the outbreak of the American War of Independence Collier was despatched to the North American station, where he performed a number of successful services that led to the conferring of a knighthood in 1775. He was then appointed commander of the 44-gun fourth-rate ship HMS Rainbow and sailed for North America in May 1776. Upon his return to the American colonies, Collier provided support for General William Howe's landing at Long Island, New York on 22 August 1776. Sent to Halifax, Nova Scotia as a senior officer by Vice-Admiral of the Blue Richard Howe, Collier captured the American 32-gun frigate USS Hancock on 8 July 1777 after a long chase. Collier followed up on his success the following month by destroying supplies at Machias, Maine, thereby ruining American plans for an invasion of Nova Scotia. He had already received the thanks of the House of Assembly of Nova Scotia on 17 June 1777 for his efforts in securing the safety of the province.

One anecdote of Rainbow during this period was written by Captain Alexander McDonald, paymaster of the 84th Regiment of Foot (Royal Highland Emigrants), on 20 December 1778:

...Flanking Companies. I am told they are a terror to All the Soldiers & Sailors about Halifax a few nights ago a boats Crew from the Rainbow was ashore & Committing some disorders & Riots in One of the Houses w'ch the Grenadiers frequent a party of them came in immediately beat the Sailors damnably and each of them took one upon his back threw them into their boat like so many bags of wool launched the boat & set them adrift.

Collier remained at Halifax until called upon to succeed the departing Admiral James Gambier as commodore and acting commander-in-chief of the North American Station on 4 April 1779. Collier duly moved to New York City and hoisted his flag aboard the 64-gun HMS Raisonnable. The strength of his squadron had been drastically reduced by the departure of many of the ships to join the fleets of John Byron and William Hotham in the West Indies. Nevertheless, Collier organised and carried out the highly successful Chesapeake raid on the Virginia coast with General Edward Mathew commanding the army contingent. Anchoring his ships in Hampton Roads on 9 May, he landed 2,000 British troops and spent the next fortnight destroying ships and supplies for the Colonial army. They encountered no serious opposition, and returned to New York having destroyed over $1 million worth of supplies.

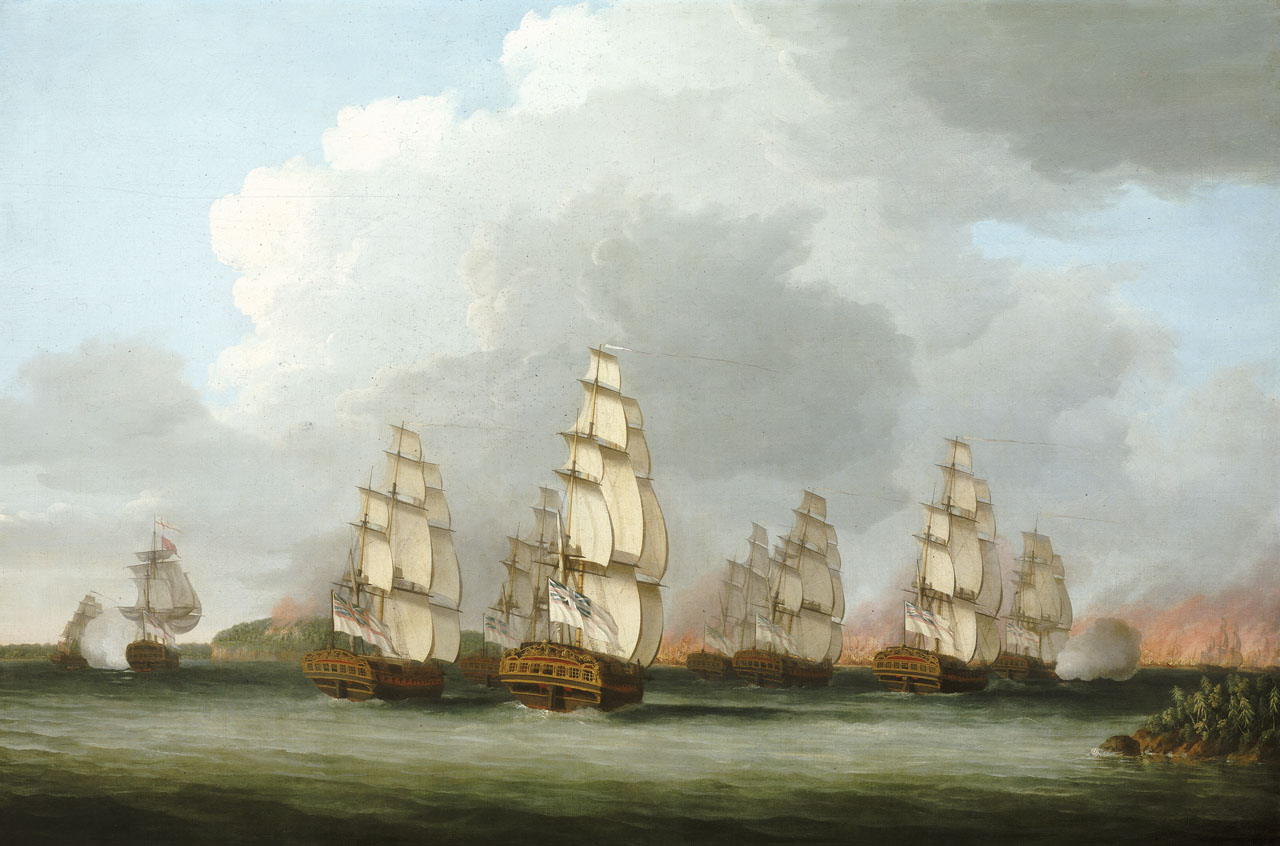
Destruction of the American Fleet at Penobscot Bay

On 30 May, Collier joined the British assault on Stony Point, New York providing support for Sir Henry Clinton, sinking an American rebel ship carrying loot and supplies removed from the fort. One of the few naval commanders able to get along with Clinton, Collier also provided naval support for William Tryon's raid of Connecticut ports in July before returning to New York in late-August. During this time he learnt that the Americans had carried out a combined land and sea assault on a recently established British outpost on Penobscot Bay. Collier gathered his forces and rushed to the scene in his flagship, supported by four frigates. He was unable to attack as soon as he arrived, being forced to wait for daylight to advance up the river. By the time he moved into the harbour, the Americans had re-embarked men and stores and withdrawn up the river. Collier gave chase, eventually forcing the Americans to burn their ships and flee into the woods. Four armed vessels nevertheless fell into Collier's hands, while the American fleet of 19 armed and 24 provision and transport vessels was destroyed. This decisively defeated the largest rebel naval force of the war, inflicting what was the United States' worst defeat at sea until the Attack on Pearl Harbor. When George III was informed of Collier's exploits, he said:

It is remarkable that Sir G. Collier, with so scanty a force, should have been during the five months able to effect more objects against the rebels than the admirals that commanded such large fleets.

Replaced as commander-in-chief by Admiral Mariot Arbuthnot while at sea, Collier was recalled to Great Britain. He sailed home aboard HMS Daphne, and arrived in Portsmouth on 29 November 1779. He assumed command of the 74-gun HMS Canada early in 1780. He commanded her in the English Channel, and participated in the relief of Gibraltar on 12 April 1781 with Vice-Admiral George Darby's force. While returning to England, Collier fell in with and after a short engagement captured the 44-gun Spanish frigate Leocadia. On his return he resigned his commission, having had some falling out or disagreement with the government, or the First Lord of the Admiralty Lord Sandwich.

== Later years ==
Collier took the opportunity of his time ashore to embark on a career in politics. He was elected as Member of Parliament for Honiton in 1784, but returned to sea in 1790 with the Spanish armament. He commanded the 98-gun HMS St George until his promotion to Rear-Admiral of the Red on 1 February 1793. Collier was promoted again to Vice-Admiral of the Blue on 12 July 1794, and received an appointment as Commander-in-Chief, The Nore in January 1795. He only held the post for a few weeks before being forced to resign it due to ill health. Collier died in London on 6 April 1795.

== Family and other achievements ==
Collier had married twice during his lifetime, once in 1763 to Christina Gwyn, with whom he had a son; and again in 1781 to Elizabeth Fryer, with whom he had two daughters and four sons. Two of these sons went into the army, the other two followed their father into the Navy. One son was Francis Augustus Collier, who like his father achieved flag rank. Sir George had written a stage version of Beauty and the Beast prior to the American War of Independence, entitled Selima and Asor. It was performed at Drury Lane in 1776, and received favourable reviews. He had also written an account of his visits to Paris and Brussels in the summer of 1773, which were published by his granddaughter in 1885 under the title France on the Eve of the Great Revolution.

== Notes ==
Parliament of Great Britain
Preceded by Sir George Yonge; Jacob Wilkinson	Member of Parliament for Honiton; 1784–1790; With: Sir George Yonge	Succeeded by Sir George Yonge; George Templer
Military offices
Preceded by John Dalrymple	Commander-in-Chief, The Nore; January 1795–April 1795	Succeeded by Charles Buckner
