= William Payne-Gallwey (cricketer) =

Irish cricketer and British Army officer

Personal information
- Full name: William Thomas Payne-Gallwey
- Born: 25 March 1881; Blackrock, Ireland
- Died: 14 September 1914 (aged 33); Vendresse-Beaulne, Aisne, France
- Batting: Unknown
- Bowling: Right-arm fast

Domestic team information
- Years: Team
- 1912: Marylebone Cricket Club

Career statistics
Competition	First-class
Matches	2
Runs scored	37
Batting average	18.50
100s/50s	–/–
Top score	16
Balls bowled	90
Wickets	2
Bowling average	27.50
5 wickets in innings	–
10 wickets in match	–
Best bowling	1/10
Catches/stumpings	1/–
- Source: Cricinfo, 22 April 2019

William Thomas Payne-Gallwey MVO (25 March 1881 – 14 September 1914) was a British Army officer and first-class cricketer. A career military officer, he was commissioned into the York and Lancaster Regiment before transferring to the Grenadier Guards and serving in the Second Boer War. He played first-class cricket in 1912, before being killed in action in the First World War in September 1914.

== Life and military career ==
The son of Ralph Payne-Gallwey and his wife, Edith Alice Usborne, he was born at Blackrock in Ireland. He was educated at Eton College, before enlisting in the 4th (Hallamshire) Battalion, York and Lancaster Regiment as a second lieutenant in February 1900. He was transferred to the Grenadier Guards in August 1900, with whom he served in South Africa during the Second Boer War. He was promoted to the rank of lieutenant in April 1904, while in June 1908 he was made a member of the Royal Victorian Order (fifth class). He was promoted to the rank of captain in July 1908 and was seconded to the Macedonian Gendarmerie.

He made his debut in first-class cricket for the Marylebone Cricket Club against Yorkshire in May 1912 at Lord's. Later in the same month he played a first-class match for the British Army cricket team against the Royal Navy at Lord's. He scored 37 runs across his two matches and took 2 wickets with his right-arm fast bowling.

He served during the opening stages of the First World War, travelling to France with the 2nd Grenadier Guards in August 1914. He was reported missing in action in September 1914, and despite rumours that he had been taken prisoner by the Germans, these proved to be unfounded and he is believed to have been killed in action on 14 September at Vendresse-Beaulne. His body was never recovered and he was commemorated on the La Ferté-sous-Jouarre memorial.
