= Vendresse-Beaulne =

- Commune
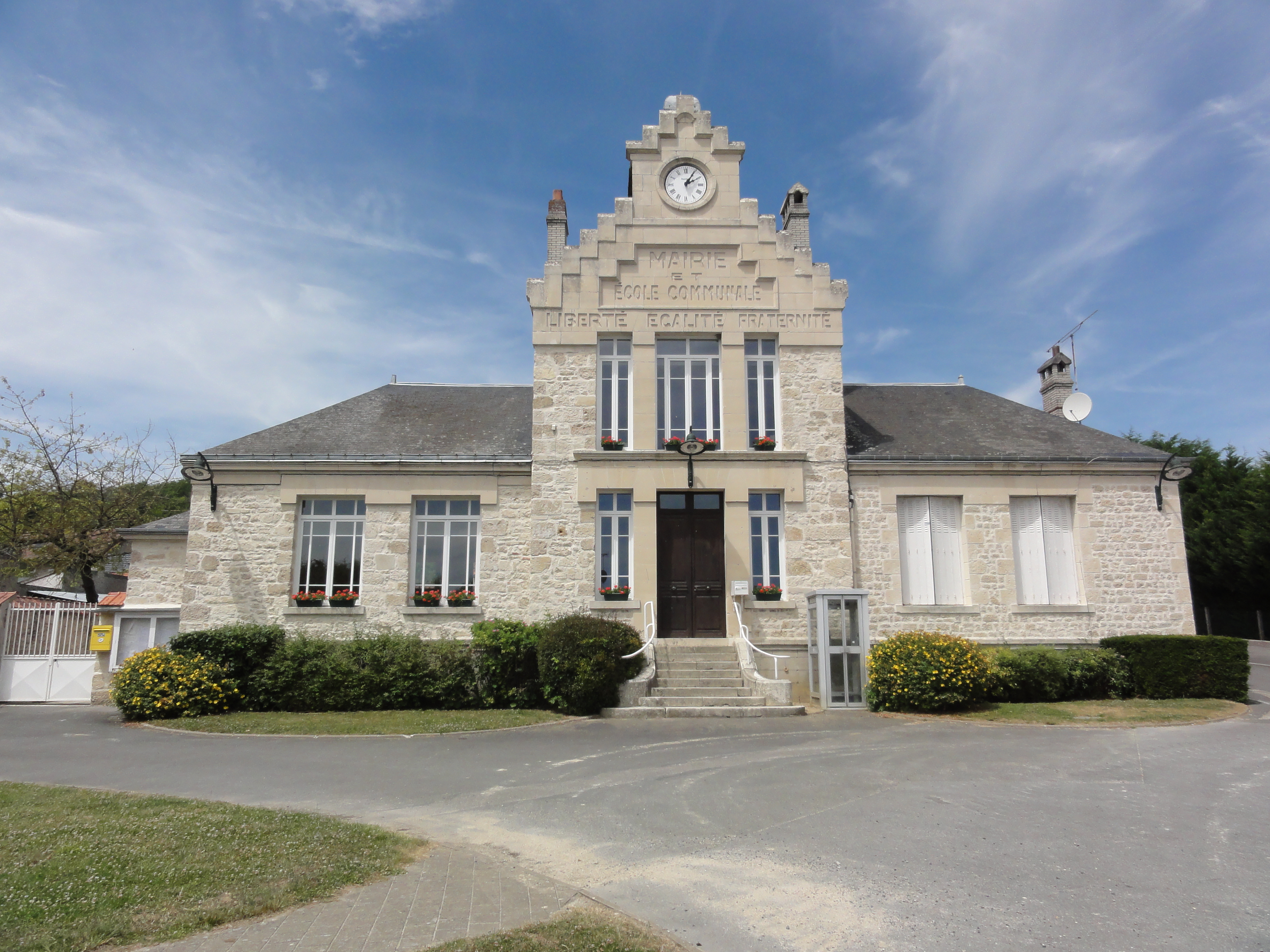
- The town hall and school of Vendresse-Beaulne
- Location of Vendresse-Beaulne
- Location within France Location within Hauts-de-France
- Coordinates: 49°25′41″N 3°40′05″E
- Country: France
- Region: Hauts-de-France
- Department: Aisne
- Arrondissement: Laon
- Canton: Villeneuve-sur-Aisne
- Intercommunality: Chemin des Dames

Government
  - Mayor (2026–32): Maxime Paruch
- Area^{1}: 8.71 km^{2} (3.36 sq mi)
- Elevation: 114 m (374 ft)
- Highest elevation: 195 m (640 ft)
- Lowest elevation: 64 m (210 ft)
- Population (2023): 101
  - Density: 11.6/km^{2} (30.0/sq mi)
- Time zone: UTC+01:00 (CET)
  - Summer (DST): UTC+02:00 (CEST)
- INSEE/Postal code: 02778 /02160
- ^{1} French Land Register data, which excludes lakes, ponds, glaciers > 1 km^{2} (0.386 sq mi or 247 acres) and river estuaries.

Vendresse-Beaulne (French pronunciation: [vɑ̃dʁɛs bo(l)n]) is a commune in the Aisne department in Hauts-de-France in northern France.

It was established in 1923, combining the commune of Beaulne-et-Chivy with the neighboring commune of Vendresse-et-Troyon.

The town has a British military cemetery established in 1920, which originated from several temporary cemeteries. This cemetery is located 500m northeast of the village, on the D967, in the direction of Cerny-en-Laonnois. 702 fallen soldiers are commemorated, including 375 unidentified soldiers.

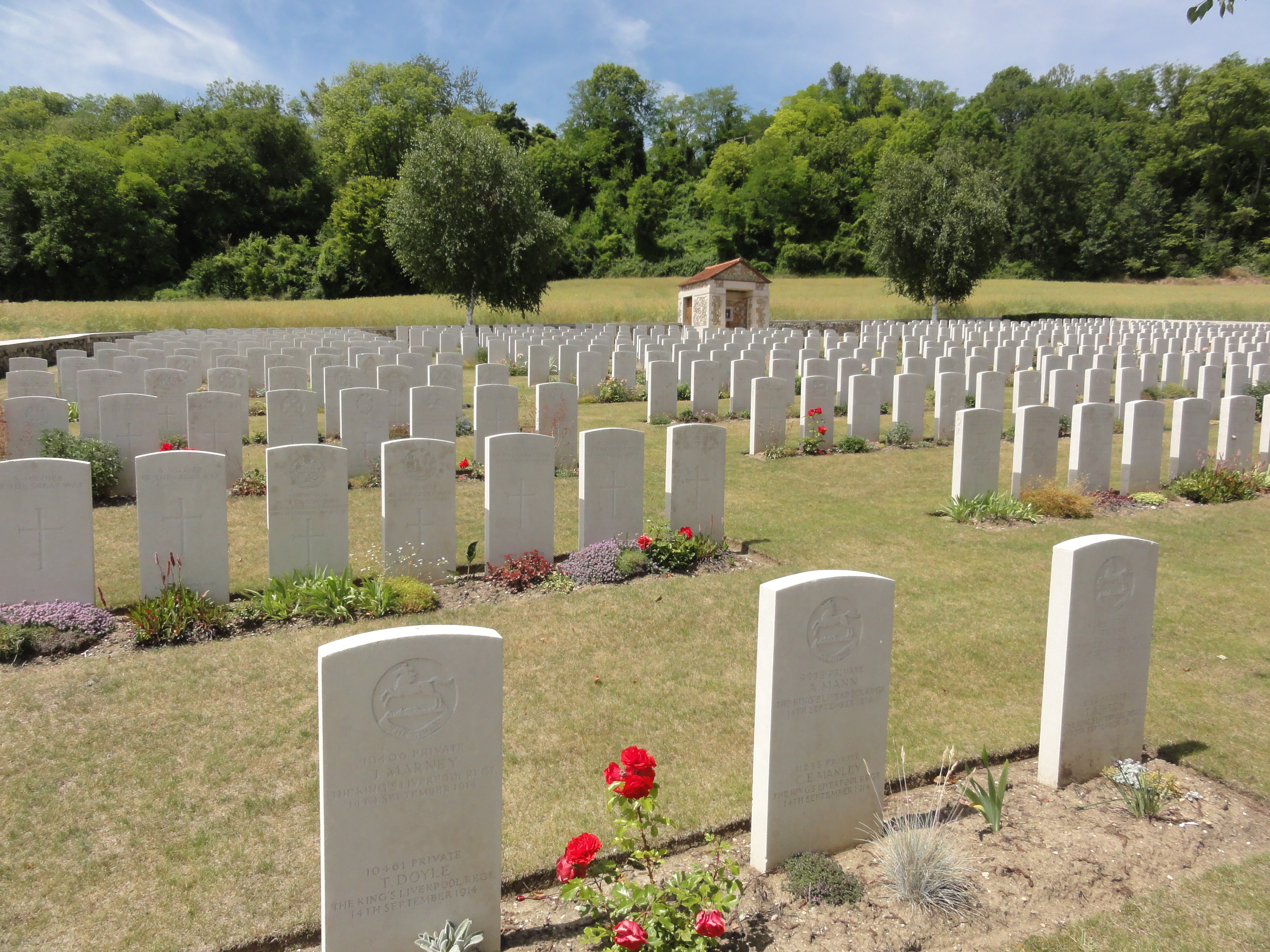
CWGC Vendresse British cemetery

== Population ==
Historical population
Year	Pop.	±% p.a.
1968	131	—
1975	105	−3.11%
1982	95	−1.42%
1990	83	−1.67%
1999	98	+1.86%
2007	115	+2.02%
2012	116	+0.17%
2017	102	−2.54%
2023	101	−0.16%
Source: INSEE

== See also ==
- Communes of the Aisne department
