= USS Hancock (1776) =

1776 frigate of the Continental Navy

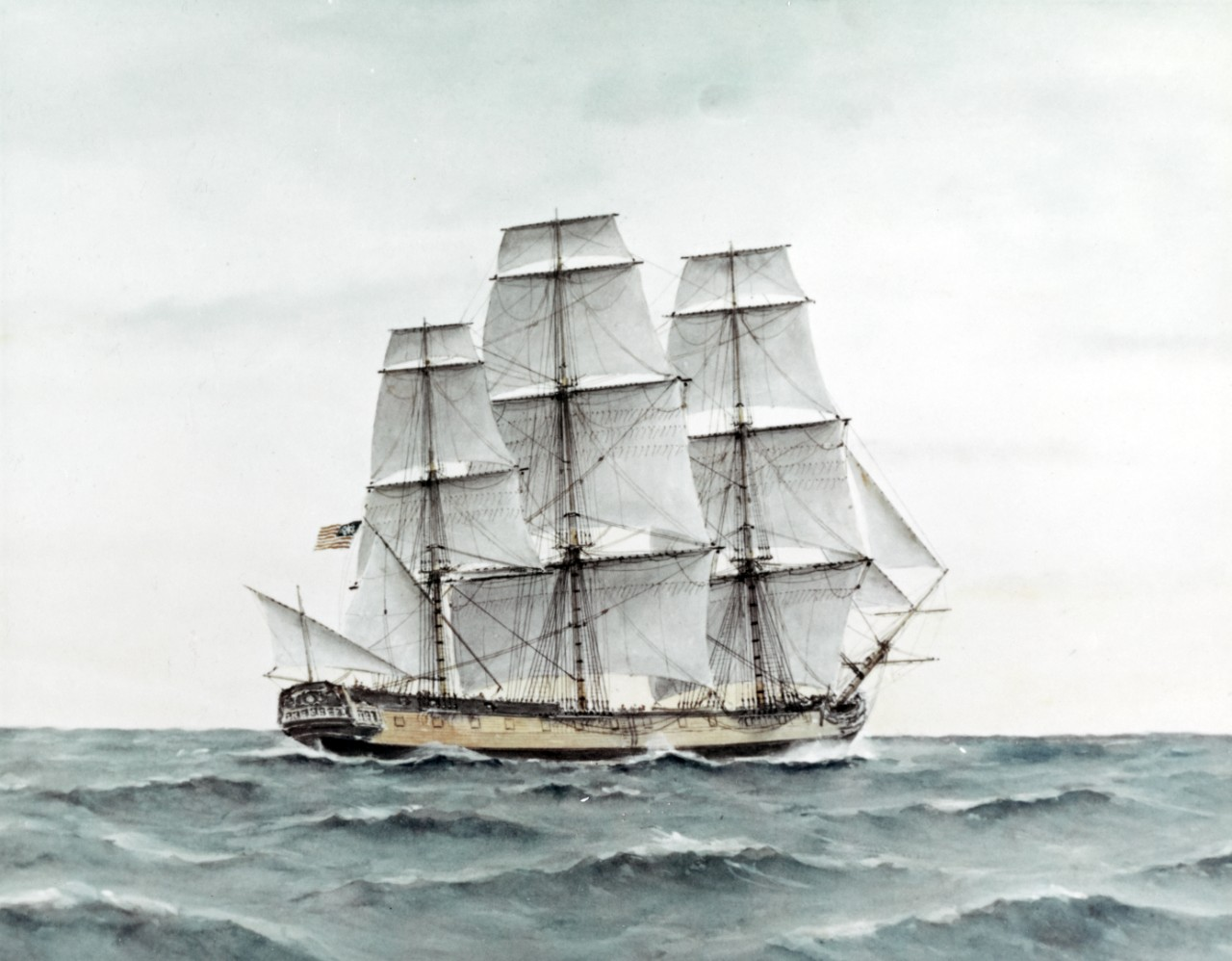
- Painting of Hancock by E. Tufnell

History

United States
- Name: USS Hancock
- Namesake: John Hancock
- Launched: 3 June 1776
- Fate: Captured by HMS Rainbow, 8 July 1777

Great Britain
- Name: HMS Iris
- Acquired: 8 July 1777
- Fate: Captured by Heron, 9 September 1781

France
- Name: Iris
- Acquired: 9 September 1781
- Fate: Sold at Rochefort in 1783

General characteristics
- Type: Frigate
- Tons burthen: 763 bm
- Length: 136 ft 7 in (41.63 m) keel 115 ft 10 in (35.31 m)
- Beam: 35 ft 6 in (10.82 m)
- Depth: 11 ft (3.4 m)
- Complement: 290 officers and men
- Armament: 24 × 12-pounder (5 kg) guns; 8 × 6-pounder (2.7 kg) guns

USS Hancock was a 32-gun frigate of the Continental Navy. A resolution of the Continental Congress dated 13 December 1775 authorized her construction; she was named for the patriot and Continental congressman John Hancock. In her career, she served under the American, British and French flags.

== As Hancock ==
Hancock was built at Newburyport, Massachusetts, and placed under the command of Captain John Manley on 17 April 1776. After a long delay in fitting out and manning her crew, she departed Boston, Massachusetts, on 21 May 1777 in company with fellow Continental frigate Boston and the Massachusetts privateer American Tartar for a cruise in the North Atlantic. American Tartar parted from the two frigates shortly thereafter to pursue her own prizes.

On 29 May, the frigates captured a small brig loaded with cordage and duck. The next day they encountered a convoy of transports escorted by the British 64-gun warship Somerset which attempted to disable the weaker Hancock. Manley was saved by a clever and well-timed action by the captain of Boston, which forced Somerset to give up the chase in order to assist the damaged transports.

After escaping from Somerset, the two frigates sailed to the northeast until 7 June when they engaged the Royal Navy's weaker 28-gun frigate Fox. Patrolling alone, Fox tried to escape her American enemies. Hancock gave chase and soon overhauled Fox, which lost her mainmast and suffered other severe damage in the ensuing duel. About an hour later, Boston joined the battle and finally compelled Fox to strike her colors.

Hancock spent the next few days repairing the prize and then resumed cruising along the coast of New England. East of Cape Sable she took a British sloop with a large cargo of coal, which she towed until the next morning when the approach of a British squadron forced Manley to set the sloop ablaze rather than risk its recapture. The British frigate Flora managed to recapture Fox after a hot action.

Boston became separated from Hancock; left alone, all Manley could do was order every sail flown in a desperate attempt to escape. Early in the morning of 8 July, the British were within striking distance. The warship Rainbow began to score with her bowchasers and followed this with a series of broadsides. The wounded Hancock was thus finally forced to strike her colors after a chase of some 39 hours. She had 239 men of her crew aboard, with 50 having already been captured while steering Fox. She also had Captain Fotheringham of Fox and 40 surviving crewmen in her brig. The others had been transferred to Boston and two requisitioned fishing vessels.

== As HMS Iris ==
Hancock, renamed Iris, served the British Navy so effectively that her new owners boasted of her as "the finest and fastest frigate in the world."

On 21 and 23 April 1780, Iris, Delaware, and Otter captured the American privateers Amazon, General Wayne, and Neptune. The capture had taken place a few leagues from Sandy Hook and Iris and Delaware brought them into New York on 1 May. (Note: Amazon, of eight guns, had a crew of 30 men under the command of Captain Stoddard. General Wayne, of 12 guns, had a crew of 45 men under the command of Captain Price. Neptune, of 16 guns, had a crew of 100 men under the command of Captain Young.)

Perhaps the greatest prize taken by Iris was the capture on 28 August 1781 of the American 28-gun ship Trumbull, another of the Continental Navy's best frigates. Trumbull had a crew of nearly 200 men. Iris captured her after an engagement of about an hour in which Iris suffered one man killed and six wounded, while Trumbull had two men killed and ten wounded.

In the aftermath of the Battle of the Chesapeake, British admirals Graves and Hood left the waters of the Chesapeake; the French established patrols of their fastest ships to guard the area. Prior to retreating, Hood dispatched Iris and Richmond to General Cornwallis at Yorktown in an effort to evacuate his army. On 9 September 1781, four French ships intercepted them; Richmond fell back and surrendered first, then the Aigrette, under Captain Traversay, captured Iris. Traversay boarded Iris, assumed command, and held it till the end of war.

== As Royal French Iris ==
On 4 November 1781, Iris, now assigned to the French navy under her old name, sailed from Annapolis to the Antilles. In January 1782 Iris took part in the Battle of St. Kitts and captured a British sloop. On the eve of the Battle of the Saintes, Admiral de Grasse detached Iris to escort a convoy of unarmed troop transports. In the late stages of the war, Iris continued her reconnaissance and cruising duties and undertook her final assignment when she carried an offer of a ceasefire on behalf of the rebel cause to British-occupied New York.

== Fate ==
The French Navy sold Iris in 1784. Her fate afterwards is unknown.

== See also ==
- List of ships captured in the 18th century
- Bibliography of early American naval history
