= Ralph Payne-Gallwey =

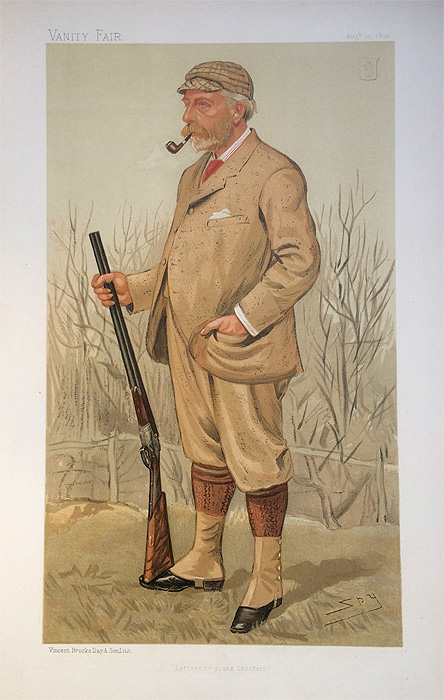
"Letters to young Shooters". Caricature by Spy published in Vanity Fair in 1893.

Sir Ralph William Frankland Payne-Gallwey, 3rd Baronet (1848–1916) was an English engineer, historian, ballistics expert, and artist.

== Life ==
The son of Sir William Payne-Gallwey, 2nd Baronet, and his wife Emily Anne, a daughter of Sir Robert Frankland-Russell, 7th Baronet, the young Payne-Gallwey was educated at Eton College. In 1881, he inherited from his father the Thirkleby Hall estate in the North Riding of Yorkshire.

He married Edith Alice Usborne. Their son William Payne-Gallwey was a soldier and first-class cricketer who was killed in action during the First World War. As a result of that, Payne-Gallwey decided to sell his Yorkshire estate.

== Works ==
Payne-Gallwey began by writing books on sport. Early works included The Book of Duck Decoys (1886) and Letters to Young Shooters (1892). His The Crossbow appeared in 1903, and his High Pheasants in Theory and Practice in 1913. In later life, he also turned to history and current affairs, with The Mystery of Maria Stella, Lady Newborough (1907), A History of the George Worn on the Scaffold by Charles I (1908) and The War, A Criticism (June, 1915). This was an appeal for conscription to be brought in, to greatly increase the size of the British Army. The also compiled an unpublished manuscript on archery, including tables of flight distances, illustrations and photographs of bows, and information on Turkish and Chinese archery.

=== Publications ===
- The Crossbow, Mediaeval and Modern, Military and Sporting; its Construction, History and Management, with a Treatise on the Balista and Catapult of the Ancients (London: Longmand Green & Co., 1903; reprinted by Holland of London, 1958; new edition by Skyhorse Publishing, 2007)
- The Fowler in Ireland, or Notes on the Haunts and Habits of Wildfowl and Seafowl: Including Instructions in the Art of Shooting and Capturing Them
- The Book of Duck Decoys: Their Construction, Management, and History (London: John van Voorst, 1886)
- Letters to Young Shooters (1892)
- The Mystery of Maria Stella, Lady Newborough (London: Edward Arnold, 1907)
- A History of the George Worn on the Scaffold by Charles I (London: Edward Arnold, 1908)
- High Pheasants in Theory and Practice (London and New York: Longmans, Green & Co., 1913)
- The War, A Criticism (London: Spottiswoode & Co., 1915)

== Notes ==
Baronetage of the United Kingdom
Preceded by William Payne-Gallwey	Baronet (of Hampton Hill); 1881–1916	Succeeded by John Frankland Payne-Gallwey
