= Action of 17 August 1779 =

- Part of the American Revolutionary War
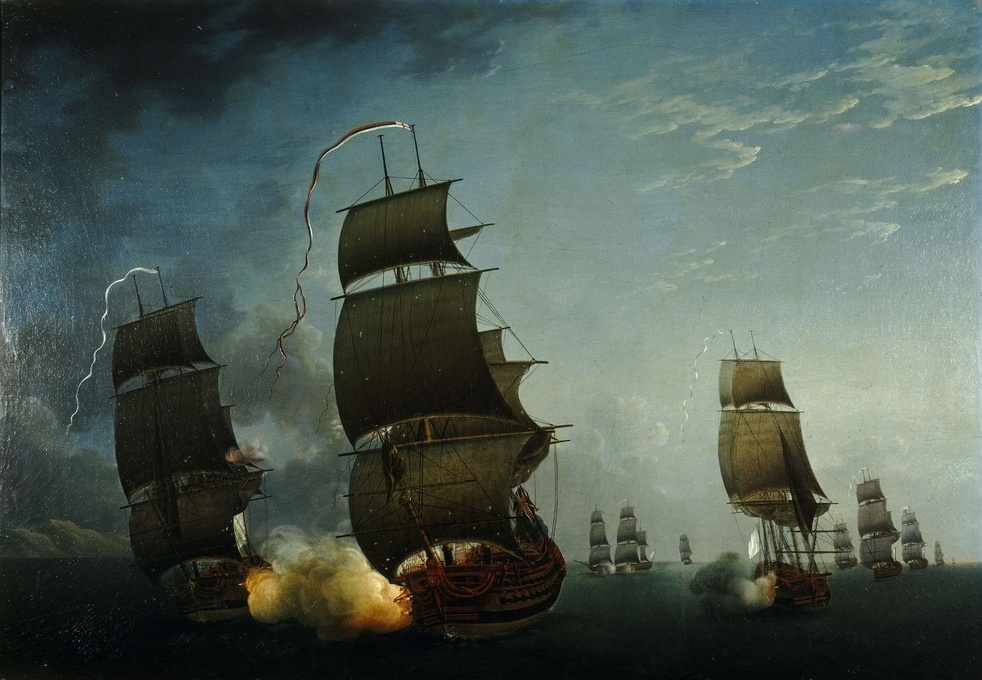
- 1790 painting of the battle
Date	17 August 1779
Location	Off Plymouth, English Channel
Result	Franco-Spanish victory

Belligerents
France; Spain	Great Britain

Commanders and leaders
(Kingdom of France) Charles de Bernard de Marigny	(Kingdom of Great Britain) Phillip Boteler

Strength
1 ship of the line 4 frigates	2 ships of the line

Casualties and losses
Unknown	1 ship of the line captured

The action of 17 August 1779 was a naval battle between a French and a British squadron in the English Channel on 17 August 1779.

In June 1779, Spain followed France declaring war on Britain and together formed a combined fleet aiming for British Isles' invasion. On 14 August, the fleet was off the Lizard and on 16 August the ships were off Plymouth with some of the enemy frigates anchored in the Cawsand Bay.

In meantime, HMS Ardent was recommissioned under the command of Captain Phillip Boteler, and sailed from Plymouth on 14 August to join Sir Charles Hardy watching the much superior Franco-Spanish forces in the English Channel. According to the ship's logs, as many as 4/5 of the crew were landmen, and neither Boteler nor the captain of HMS Marlborough, in whose company Ardent was sailing, was aware that a French fleet had put to sea. Ardent encountered the fleet two days after sailing, and after receiving the correct replies to the coded signal, both ships ran down to meet them and assumed that they were British. Instead, the fleet they encountered was French and Spanish in possession of a Royal Navy signal codebook, which permitted the correct response of Ardent's "who are you?" question.

With Ardent within range, the French frigate Junon fired two broadsides before raising her colours. In response, Ardent offered sporadic and inaccurate return fire and after three further French frigates and a Spanish ship of the line, Princesa, joined the action, she struck her colours. In the meantime, Marlborough sailed away from the action and escaped back to Britain unscathed.

At his subsequent court martial Captain Boteler blamed his failure to return fire on an inadequate supply of gunpowder for Ardent's cannon, a statement that was denied by the ship's gunner. Archibald Macintyre provided evidence that there was enough powder for fifty minutes of engagement. The court martial rejected Boteler's appeals, found instead that the inexperience of the crew was the principal cause of the Ardent's capture and expelled him from the Navy for his failure to adequately defend his ship.

Ardent was nevertheless recaptured by the British on 14 April 1782 after the Battle of the Saintes and recommissioned that month under Captain Richard Lucas. On 28 August 1783, the ship was renamed Tiger and was sold out of the service in June 1784.
