= HMS Fox (1773) =

Enterprise-class Royal Navy frigate

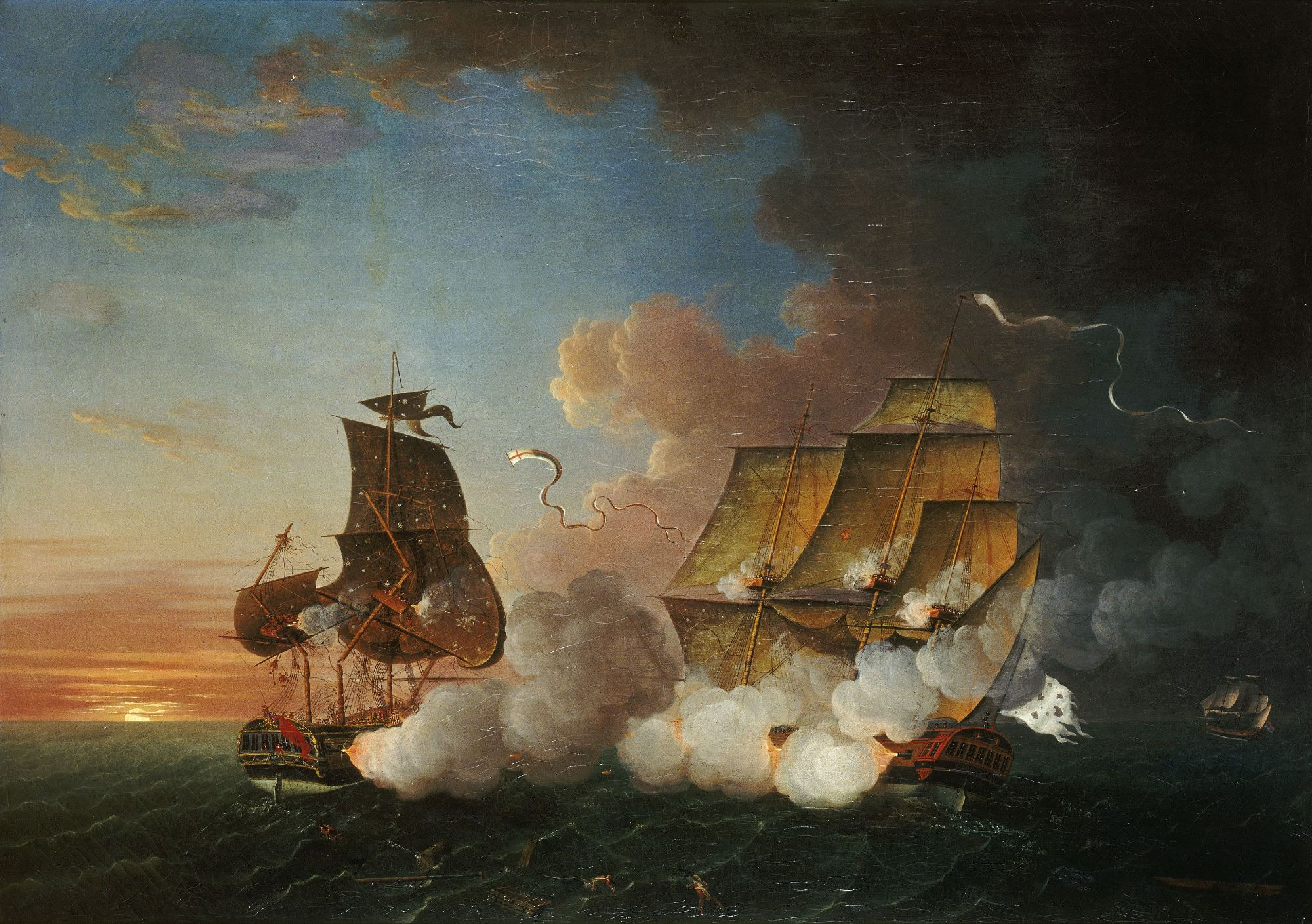
- The capture of HMS Fox by the French frigate Junon

History

Great Britain
- Name: HMS Fox
- Ordered: 25 December 1770
- Builder: Thomas Raymond, Northam, Southampton
- Laid down: May 1771
- Launched: 2 September 1773
- Completed: 12 February 1776 at Portsmouth Dockyard
- Commissioned: October 1775
- Fate: Captured by two American frigates off Newfoundland, 7 June 1777

United States
- Name: Fox
- Acquired: 7 June 1777 by capture
- Captured: 8 July 1777

Great Britain
- Name: HMS Fox
- Acquired: 8 July 1777 by capture
- Captured: 11 September 1778

France
- Acquired: 11 September 1778 by capture
- Fate: Grounded March 1779 and could not be refloated

General characteristics
- Class & type: 28-gun Enterprise-class sixth-rate frigate
- Tons burthen: 599 83/94 (bm)
- Length: 120 ft 6 in (36.73 m) (overall); 99 ft 6 in (30.33 m) (keel)
- Beam: 33 ft 8 in (10.3 m)
- Depth of hold: 11 ft 0 in (3.35 m)
- Sail plan: Full-rigged ship
- Complement: 200 officers and men
- Armament: Upper deck: 24 × 9-pounder guns; QD: 4 × 6-pounder guns; Fc: nil; Also: 12 × swivel guns

HMS Fox was a 28-gun Enterprise-class sixth-rate frigate of the Royal Navy. Fox was first commissioned in October 1775 under the command of Captain Patrick Fotheringham. The Americans captured her in June 1777, only to have the British recapture her about a month later. The French then captured her a little less than a year after that, only to lose her to grounding in 1779, some six months later.

== Career ==
=== Capture ===
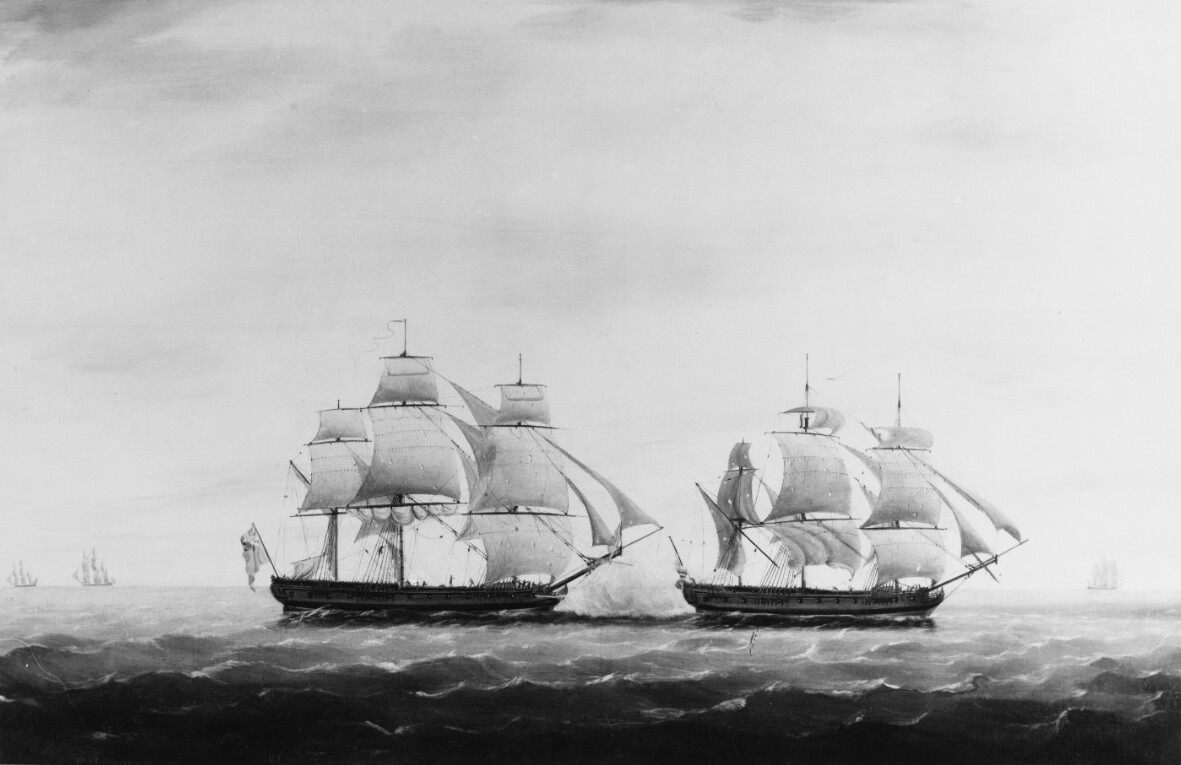
Fox being recaptured by the British

On 7 June 1777 Fox was cruising off the Grand Banks of Newfoundland when she sighted a strange vessel. Fox sailed towards the stranger until she sighted yet another strange vessel. Suspecting that these were both American frigates, Fox attempted to escape. However, Hancock, the first of the two, caught up with Fox and an engagement started that lasted for about a half-hour before Boston was able to join the combat. Fox again attempted to sail away, but Hancock caught up and opened fire. After Boston came up too and was able to shoot away Fox's mainmast and wheel, Fotheringham struck. Fox had lost four men killed and eight wounded.

=== Recapture ===
One month later, on 7–8 July, Hancock, Boston, and Fox were in company when they encountered HMS Rainbow, under the command of Captain Sir George Collier, and HMS Victor. Rainbow had left Halifax in the morning of 6 July and in the afternoon sighted three sail. She gave chase, during which HMS Flora came up independently and proceeded to engage one of the unknown vessels. The next day Rainbow and Flora exchanged quarry, with Rainbow pursuing the largest enemy vessel, accepting that one of the three American vessels would necessarily escape. The brig Victor was a poor sailer and essentially played no role in the engagement. Ultimately, Rainbow captured Hancock after a 39-hour chase, but Boston escaped to the Sheepscot River on the Maine coast. (Captain McNeill, of Boston, was court-martialed in June 1779 for his failure to support Hancock and was dismissed from the U.S. Navy.)

Collier's after-action letter made no mention of any casualties on either side, even though the vessels had exchanged some fire. Hancock normally had a complement of 290 men, but only 229 on board when Rainbow captured her; the remainder were a prize crew on Fox. Fotheringham and 40 of his men were prisoners on Hancock. The other officers and some of the men were aboard Boston, and Captain John Manley of Hancock had put most into a fishing vessel and sent them to Newfoundland. Because of the number of American prisoners involved, Rainbow took Hancock into Halifax. When Collier arrived at Halifax he was delighted to see that Flora had captured Fox and that they had arrived there before him.

Fotheringham then sailed Fox back to England. There he was tried for the loss of his ship, and acquitted.

=== And capture again ===
The French frigate Junon captured Fox on 11 September 1778. Fox, now under the command of Captain the Honourable Thomas Windsor, was off Brest when she sighted a ship and sloop. Fox gave chase, but the weather made visibility poor and obscured Junon's approach. When Fox finally sighted Junon, Fox prepared to engage. The two vessels maneuvered against each other until finally they gave up and simply exchanged broadsides. Junon, unusually for a French vessel, fired at Fox's hull rather than her rigging, with the result that Junon's heavier guns were able to inflict heavy casualties on Fox, and shoot away her three masts. Windsor was forced to strike, having lost 14 men killed and 32 wounded.

== Fate ==
Fox ran aground in March 1779 on Pointe St Jacques on the Rhuys Peninsula and could not be refloated.
