= Sir William Payne-Gallwey, 2nd Baronet =

English politician (1807–1881)

Sir William Payne-Gallwey, 2nd Baronet (1807 – 19 December 1881) was an English Conservative Party politician who sat in the House of Commons from 1851 to 1880.

Payne-Gallwey was the son of Sir William Payne-Gallwey, 1st Baronet and his wife Harriet Quin, daughter of the 1st Earl of Dunraven. His father was a British Army general and governor of the Leeward Islands. Payne-Gallwey was a major in the 7th Fusiliers and succeeded his father in the baronetcy in 1831. He was a deputy lieutenant and J.P. for the North Riding of Yorkshire.

At a by-election in March 1851, Payne-Gallwey was elected unopposed as the Member of Parliament (MP) for Thirsk. He was re-elected without a contest in the next four general elections, and in contested elections in 1868 and 1874. He held the seat until he stood down at the 1880 general election.

Payne-Gallwey died at the age of 74, as a result of severe internal injuries sustained after falling upon a turnip while out shooting in the parish of Bagby.

Payne-Gallwey married Emily Anne Russell, daughter of Sir Robert Frankland Russell, 7th Baronet in 1847. They had four sons and three daughters. He was succeeded by his eldest son, Ralph.

Parliament of the United Kingdom
Preceded by John Bell	Member of Parliament for Thirsk; 1851 – 1880	Succeeded by Lewis Payn Dawnay
Baronetage of the United Kingdom
Preceded by William Payne-Gallwey	Baronet (of Hampton Hill, Middlesex); 1831–1881	Succeeded by Ralph Payne-Gallwey
