= Sir William Payne-Gallwey, 1st Baronet =

British Army general (1759-1831)

General Sir William Payne-Gallwey Bt
- Born: 1759; Saint Kitts
- Died: 16 April 1831 (aged 71–72)
- Military career
- Allegiance: United Kingdom
- Branch: British Army
- Service years: 1776–1831
- Rank: General

General Sir William Payne-Gallwey, 1st Baronet (1759 – 16 April 1831) was a British soldier and Governor of the Leeward Islands. He was the youngest son of Ralph Payne by his second spouse Margaret née Gallwey, of St. Kitts, West Indies. He served as a Lieutenant-general in India, and was at one point second-in-command of the British Army in Spain. Thereafter he was appointed Governor of the Leeward Islands. General Payne was the half-brother of Ralph Payne, 1st Baron Lavington (d. 1807), who had also served as Governor of the Leeward Islands.

== Early life ==
William Payne was born in Saint Kitts in 1759, the youngest son of the sugar plantation owner Ralph Payne and his wife Margaret (née Gallwey). The families of both his parents were established leaders of society on the island.

== Career ==
Payne used the wealth his family had accumulated from their plantations to join the British Army as a cornet in the 1st Dragoons on 25 January 1776. Becoming a lieutenant on 14 July 1777, he was promoted to captain on 15 April 1782. Payne's regiment did not travel to America to fight in the American Revolutionary War but instead was kept in garrison in Britain, where it helped suppress civil unrest such as a riot by Birmingham workmen in 1791.

Payne was promoted to major in February 1794 and then again to lieutenant colonel on 1 March; he then transferred to the 3rd Dragoon Guards, where he became a colonel on 1 January 1798. Thereafter, he spent three years on the army staff in Ireland before exchanging to the 10th Light Dragoons as a major-general. In 1807 he was appointed colonel of the 23rd Light Dragoons and fought in the Peninsular War (1807–1814), receiving the Army Gold Medal for his service at the Battle of Talavera (1809). Promoted to lieutenant-general in 1811, he became colonel of the 19th Light Dragoons in 1814 followed by periods in the 12th Royal Lancers and 3rd The King's Own Hussars. In 1825, he became a full general.

Payne was created a baronet in the Baronetage of the United Kingdom on 8 December 1812. On 7 March 1814 he assumed by Royal Sign Manual the additional surname of Gallwey, in compliance with the will of his maternal uncle Tobias Wall Gallwey of St. Christopher Island.

== Family ==
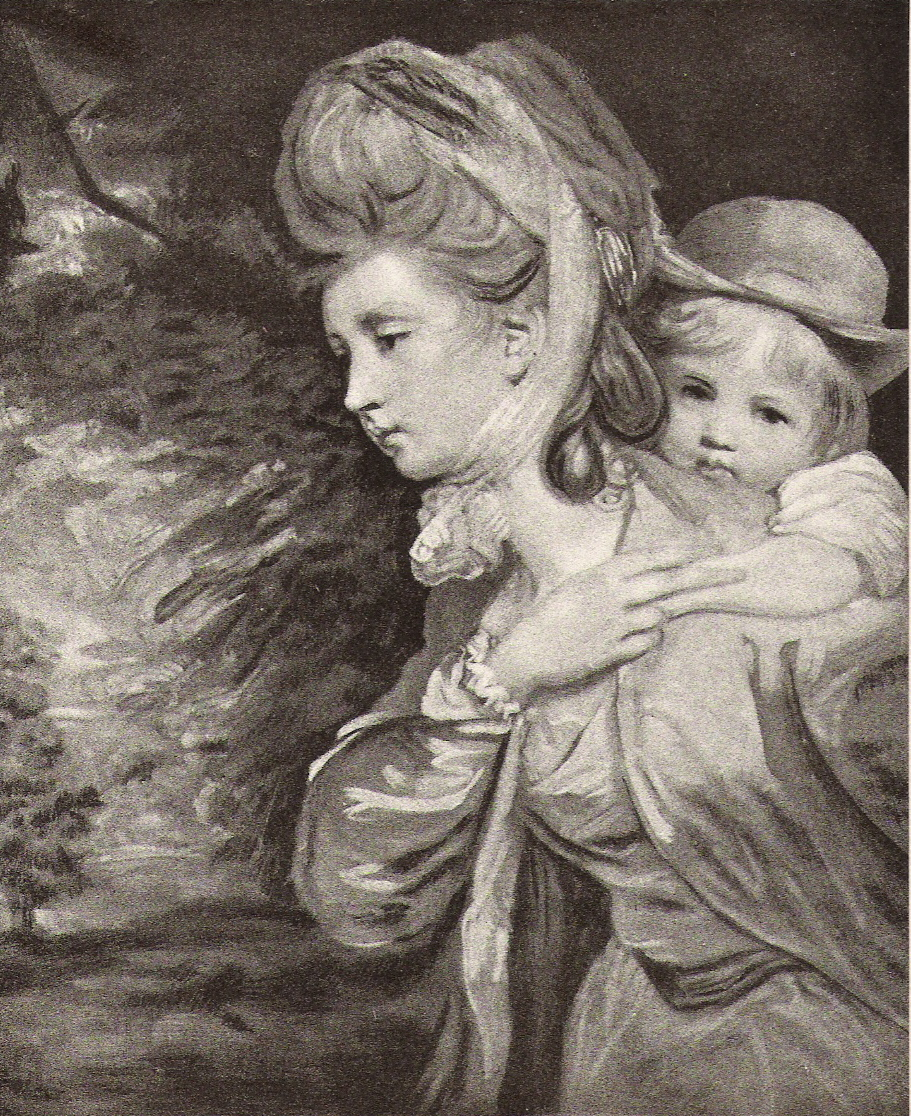
Payne's wife Harriet carrying one of their sons, by Sir Joshua Reynolds

On 19 November 1804, William Payne married Lady Harriet Quinn (d. 13 December 1845), only daughter of Valentine Quin, 1st Earl of Dunraven and Mount-Earl. They had two sons and a daughter, Caroline. Their second son, Philip, had seven sons, two daughters, and many descendants. Sir William was succeeded by his eldest son and heir, Sir William Payne-Gallwey, 2nd Baronet.

== Citations ==
Military offices
Preceded by William Cartwright	Colonel of the 23rd Regiment of (Light) Dragoons; 1807–1814	Succeeded by Sir Henry Fane
Preceded by The Viscount Howe	Colonel of the 19th Regiment of (Light) Dragoons; 1814–1815	Succeeded by Sir John Vandeleur
Preceded by Sir James Steuart-Denham, Bt	Colonel of the 12th (The Prince of Wales's); Royal Regiment of (Light) Dragoons (Lancers); 1815–1825	Succeeded by Sir Colquhoun Grant
Preceded by Richard Vyse	Colonel of the 3rd (Prince of Wales's) Dragoon Guards; 1825–1831	Succeeded by Samuel Hawker
Baronetage of the United Kingdom
New creation	Baronet (of Hampton Hill); 1812–1831	Succeeded by William Payne-Gallwey
