= French frigate Junon (1778) =

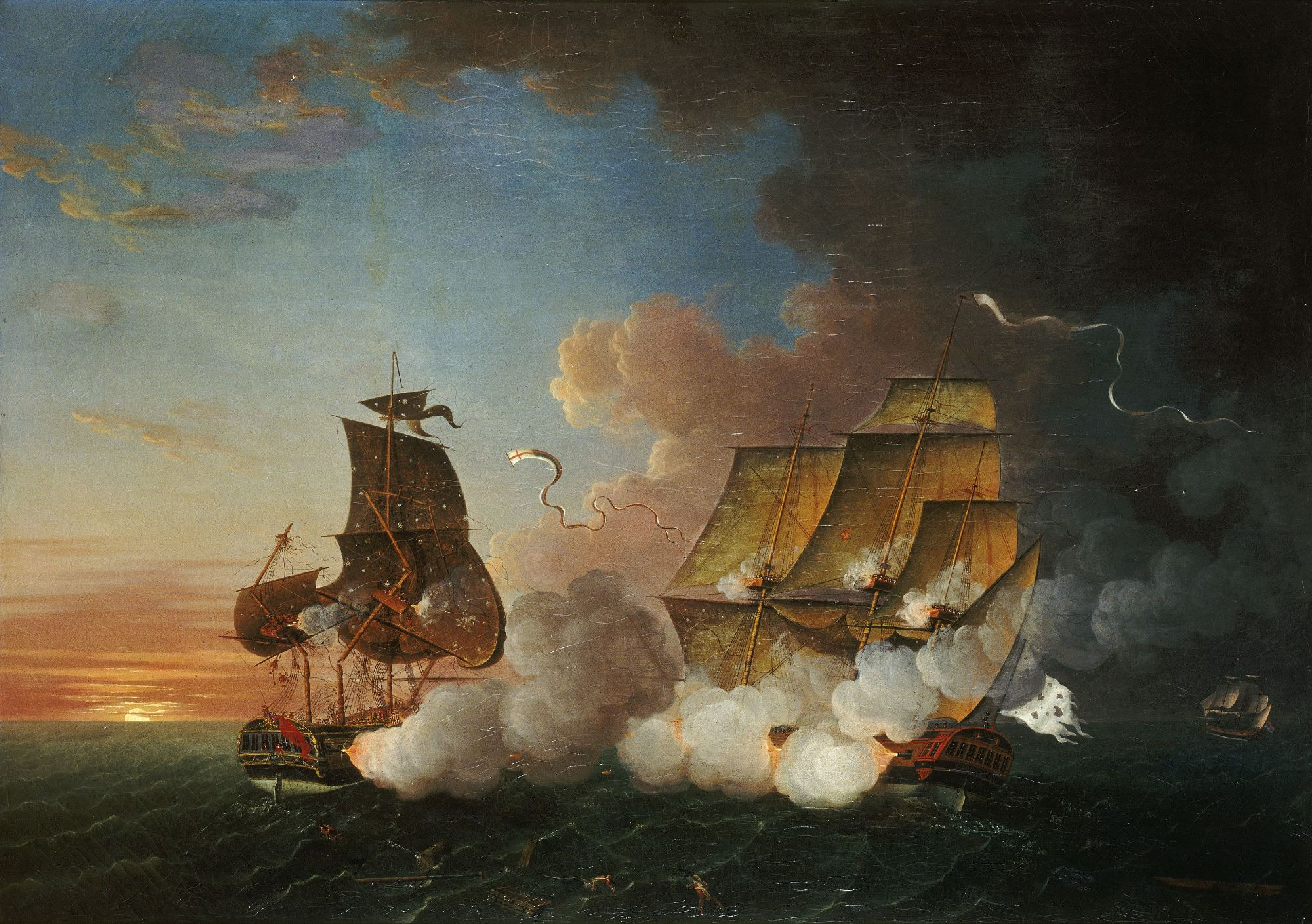
- A painting of the capture of HMS Fox by Junon (right)

History

France
- Name: Junon
- Builder: Rochefort
- Laid down: September 1777
- Launched: March 1778
- In service: May 1778
- Fate: Wrecked by the Great Hurricane of 1780 on 11 October 1780 in Kingstown Harbour, St. Vincent and the Grenadines

General characteristics
- Class & type: Charmante-class frigate
- Displacement: 1,089 tonneaux
- Tons burthen: 535 port tonneaux
- Length: 44.2 m (145 ft 0 in)
- Beam: 11.2 m (36 ft 9 in)
- Draught: 5.4 m (17 ft 9 in)
- Armament: 32 guns

Junon was a 32-gun Charmante-class frigate of the French Navy.

== Career ==
Junon took part in the Battle of Ushant under Louis Guillouet, comte d'Orvilliers. She captured the 28-gun HMS Fox on 11 September 1778. Junon tried unsuccessfully to rake Fox from astern but then closed and the two ships exchanged broadsides; Junon fired into Fox's hull rather than at her rigging and managed to topple all three masts and cause significant casualties before Fox surrendered.

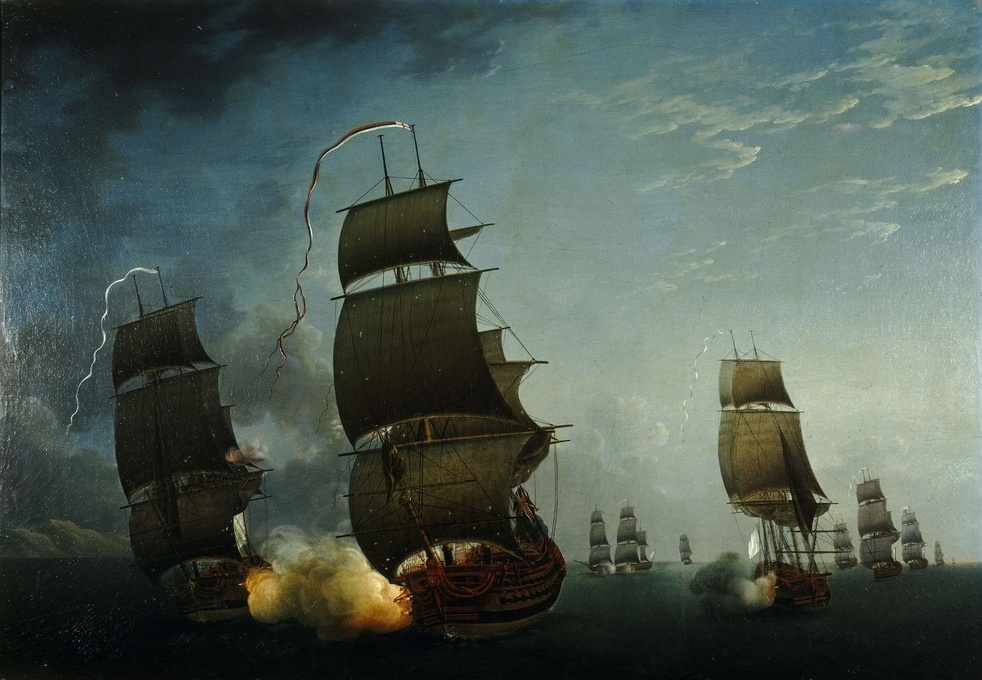
The action of 17 August 1779

On 17 August 1779, under captain Charles de Bernard de Marigny and along with Gentille, she captured the 64-gun third rate HMS Ardent after posing as a British frigate but then hoisting French colors and firing several unanswered broadsides into the larger vessel. On 13 September 1780, under Lieutenant Kergariou Locmaria, she captured the 18-gun naval sloop HMS Rover after an overnight chase and a fierce firefight that destroyed Rover's rigging.

In October 1780, Junon sailed from Martinique to St. Vincent towing a schooner to deliver hospital supplies to the island, which had recently come under French control. Junon anchored beneath the cliffs in Kingstown Harbour and, due to a broken barometer, had no warning when the island was struck by a hurricane. The massive storm, known as the Great Hurricane of 1780, battered the frigate against the cliffs and caused her to sink on 11 October 1780, although her captain managed to lead the entire crew off the ship and up the cliffs in safety.

== Archaeological investigations ==
From December 1997 to January 1998 the Junon shipwreck was investigated by an archaeological team sponsored by the Institute of Maritime History and Florida State University and directed by David Johnson and Chuck Meide. The site was initially thought to be that of the British slave ship Africa , but archaeologists soon realized the size of the wreck and caliber of its guns suggested it was a small warship rather than a slave ship or privateer. After raising a cannon and finding it to be a French 12-pounder naval gun dated 1776, it was realized the ship was most likely a late 18th-century French frigate. Confirmation that the wreck was that of the Junon came over twenty years later after the discovery of archival documents in France by archaeologist Jean-Sébastien Guibert of the University of the French Antilles. Guibert led a second archaeological expedition to the wreck of Junon in October 2021. The 2021 expedition consisted of a French team along with American archaeologist Chuck Meide from the original 1997-1998 investigation. Guibert returned to the site of the Junon with a French and American team to conduct additional excavation in 2023.
