= French frigate Vestale (1756) =

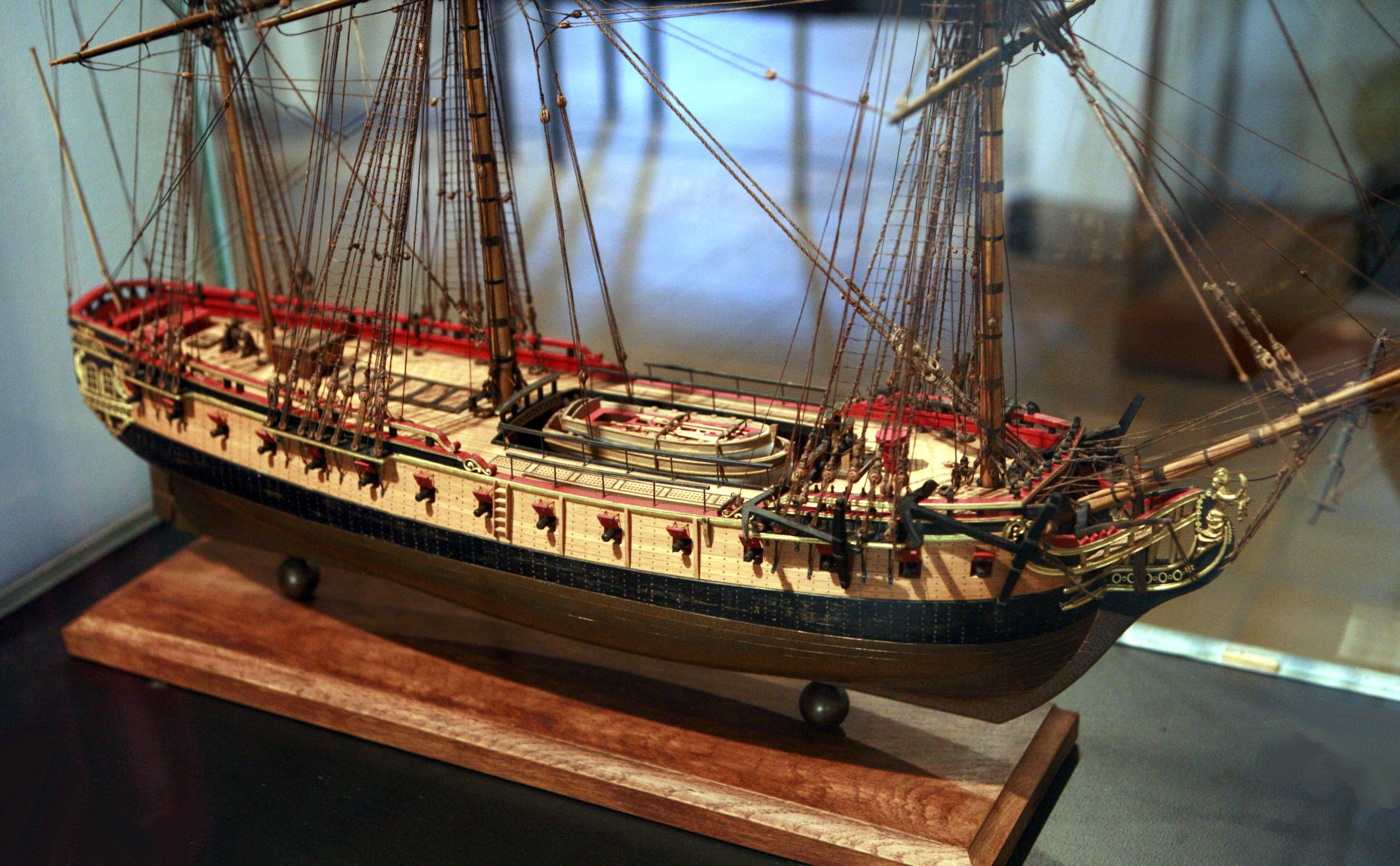
- Scale model on display at the Musée de la Marine in Toulon

History

France
- Name: Vestale
- Namesake: Vestal Virgin
- Builder: Le Havre, plans by Jean-Joseph Ginoux
- Launched: 1756
- Captured: by Britain, 8 January 1761

Great Britain
- Name: Flora
- Acquired: 1761
- Fate: Scuttled 5 August 1778

France
- Name: Flore américaine
- Acquired: 1784 by purchase
- Renamed: Citoyenne Française (April 1793); reverted to Flore in the French Navy
- Captured: By Britain, 7–8 September 1798
- Fate: Sold for breaking up

General characteristics
- Class & type: Blonde-class frigate
- Displacement: 880 tonneaux
- Tons burthen: 480 port tonneaux
- Complement: Navy: 181–184; 1793–95:254 (220 at capture)
- Armament: Originally: 26 × 8-pounder long guns + 4 × 4-pounder long guns; 1784: 26 × 12-pounder guns (Upper deck; UD) + 6 ×6-pounder guns (Spar Deck; SD); 1784: 26 × 8-pounder guns (UD) + 6 ×6-pounder guns (SD); 1793:26 × 8-pounder guns (UD) + 8 × 6-pounder guns (SD)
- Armour: Timber

Vestale was a Blonde-class 30-gun frigate of the French Navy. The Royal Navy captured her in 1761, but had to scuttle her in 1778 to avoid having the French recapture her. She was refloated and sold to the French in 1784. She returned to wartime service in 1794 as a privateer. The British recaptured her in 1798 and broke her up thereafter.

== Vestale ==
She took part in the Battle of Quiberon Bay (November 1759).

HMS Unicorn captured her on 8 January 1761. Vestale, under the command of M. Boisbertelot, had been part of a squadron of five ships that had left the Vilaine river for Brest under the cover of a heavy fog. When Unicorn encountered Vestale off the Penmarks a two-hour engagement ensued until Vestale struck. Hunt received a wound at the third broadside and died of his injuries an hour after the action ended. The British had five killed and ten wounded, the majority of them dangerously. The French had many killed and wounded, among them Captain Boisbertelot, who lost a leg, and died of his wounds the next day. Lieutenant John Symons, who took command of Unicorn on Hunt's death, described Vestale as having twenty-six 12 and 9-pounder guns on her lower deck, and four 6-pounders on her quarterdeck; she also had a crew of 220 men.

== HMS Flora ==
The Royal Navy recommissioned Vestale in July as HMS Flora, under the command of Captain Gamaliel Nightingale, for the channel and The Downs. July 1761 commissioned. She was paid off in 1762 or 1763.

Captain C. Saxton recommissioned her in January 1771 for Channel service. Captain G. Collier sailed for Cronstadt on 2 June 1772, to deliver the new ambassador. Captain John Brisbane recommissioned her in December 1775. He then sailed Flora for North America on 29 April 1776.

On 8 July 1777, during the capture of Hancock, Flora recaptured Fox, which the Americans had captured a month earlier.

On 30 May 1778, 100 men of the 54th Regiment of Foot embarked on boats to attack saw mills at Fall River, Massachusetts. The galley Pigot and some armed boats were to provide support. Pigot grounded, but the attack proceeded anyway. A sharp skirmish ensued when the troops arrived at their objective. Even so, they were able to destroy one saw mill and one grain mill, as well as a large stock of planks and boards, other buildings, some cedar boats, and so on. They then withdrew, having lost two men killed and five officers and men wounded. As the tide returned, Pigot was floated off, but as Flora towed her off, Flora lost two men killed and a lieutenant severely wounded, all by fire from shore batteries.

French Admiral d'Estaing's squadron arrived in Narragansett Bay on 29 July to support the American army under General George Washington during the battle of Rhode Island. On 30 July, four French ships of the line entered Narrngansett Bay and positioned themselves north of Conanicut Island to support the American and French forces in the battle of Rhode Island. The arrival of the French vessels trapped several British vessels, Flora among them.

Captain Brisbane was the senior British naval officer and he ordered the naval vessels to land their guns, men, and stores for the benefit of the garrison at Newport. Flora was in the inner harbour and on 5 August Brisbane scuttled her in shallow water. The Royal Navy ended up having to destroy ten of their own vessels in all.

== Return to French service ==
After the Americans recaptured Newport, they some time later refloated and repaired Flora. On 16 August 1782, Lloyd's List reported that the transport Amazon, Gray, master, had been taken while carrying clothing to Quebec. Her captor was the American letter of marque Flora, formerly HMS Flora, which sent her capture into Bordeaux.

After Flora reached Bordeaux, the French Navy bought her in September 1784; she was known as Flore américaine, to distinguish her from Flore, built since.

The French Navy refitted her between January and May 1786. Then in 1787 Flore americaine was renamed Flore. The next year the Navy re-rated her as a corvette, and rearmed her with 8-pounder guns. The Navy struck her from the lists and hulked her at Rochefort in May 1789, disarming her some two years later, and then selling her on 4 July 1792.

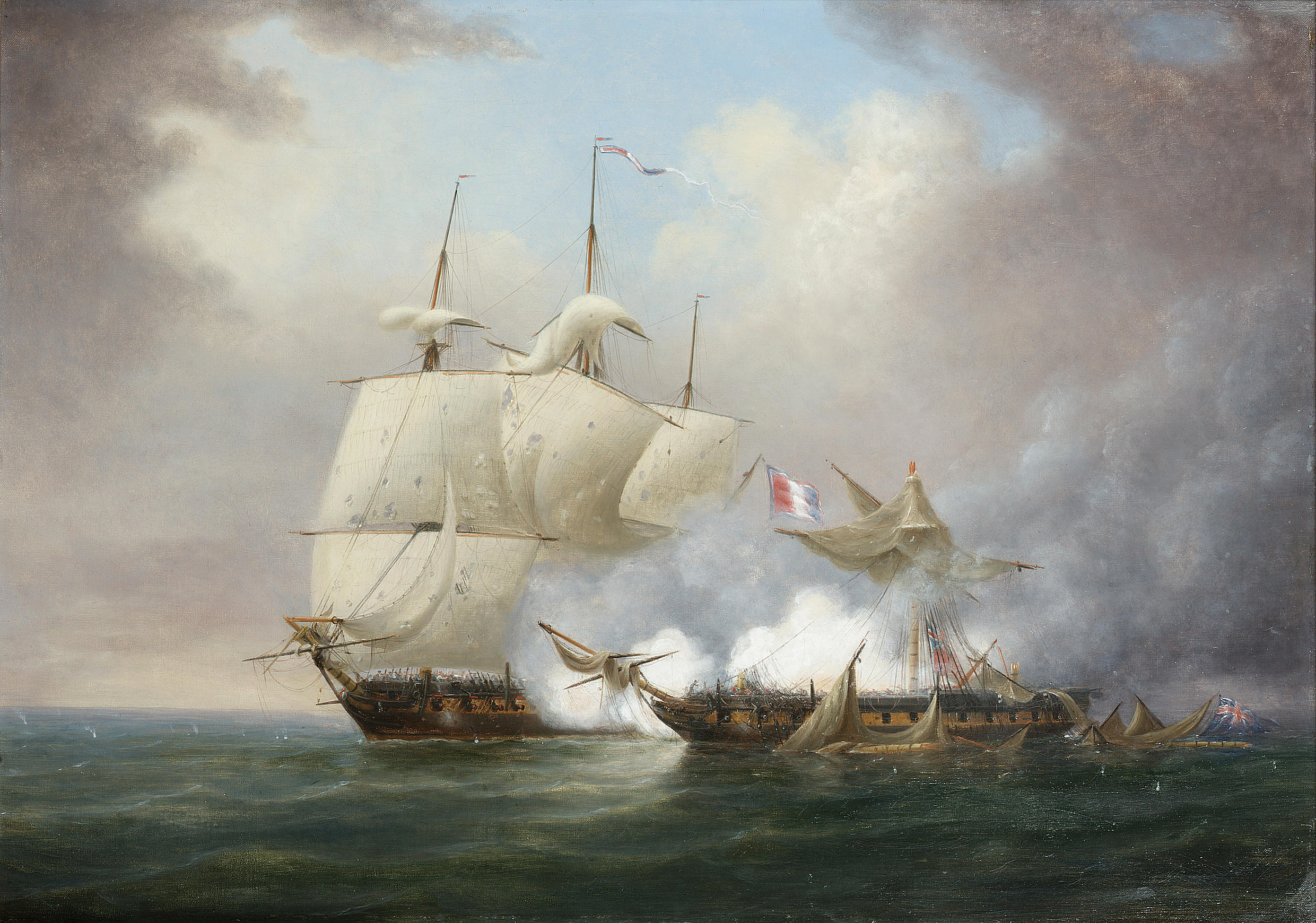
Battle between Citoyenne Française and HMS Iris on 13 May 1793, by Thomas Luny.

Her new, private owners, renamed her Citoyenne Française in April 1793. They commissioned her as a privateer out of Bordeaux in May. She then fought an inconclusive but sanguinary engagement with HMS Iris on 13 May 1793. The two vessels encountered each other at 6 p.m. at 42°34′N 13°12′W and after a short chase by Iris, an action of one and a half hours began. When Iris lost her foremast, main topmast, and mizzenmast, Citoyenne Française escaped. She had lost Captain Dubedat and 15 other men killed, and 37 men wounded. British casualties were four men killed, one man mortally wounded, and 31 wounded.

The French Navy requisitioned Citoyenne Française in August, but then returned her to her former owners in December 1795. Her owners again deployed her as a privateer.

== Fate ==
HMS Phaeton and HMS Anson captured her on 8 September 1798 after Phaeton had chased her for 20 hours. Captain Robert Stopford, of Phaeton, in his letter described Flore as a frigate of 36 guns and 255 men. She was eight days out of Boulogne on a cruise. Stopford had heard of her departure and had searched for her for a week. Flore was then sold for breaking up.

== Other ==
A model is on display at the Musée de la Marine in Paris, and another in the naval museum in Toulon.
