= Mugford =

Mugford may refer to:

== Ships ==
- USS Mugford (DD-105), a destroyer launched in 1918 and decommissioned in 1922
- USS Mugford (DD-389), a destroyer that served in World War II

== People ==
- Harold Sandford Mugford (1894–1958), English recipient of the Victoria Cross
- James Mugford (1749–1776), captain in the U.S. Continental Navy
- Julie Mugford, a key prosecution witness in the White House Farm murders trial

== See also ==
- Mogford, a surname
