= USS Huntington =

Three ships of the United States Navy have been named USS Huntington, after the city of Huntington, West Virginia.

- USS Huntington (CA-5) was the renamed Pennsylvania-class armored cruiser USS West Virginia (ACR-5)
- USS Huntington (CL-77) was originally to be a Cleveland-class light cruiser, but was completed as the Independence-class light aircraft carrier USS Cowpens (CVL-25)
- USS Huntington (CL-107) was a Fargo-class light cruiser in service from 1946 to 1949
