= USS Mugford =

USS Mugford may refer to the following ships of the United States Navy:

- USS Mugford (DD-105), Wickes-class destroyer that was launched in 1918 and decommissioned in 1922
- USS Mugford (DD-389), Bagley-class destroyer that was launched in 1937 and served until 1947, having served through World War II
