= USS Mindoro (CVE-120) =

Commencement Bay-class escort carrier of the US Navy

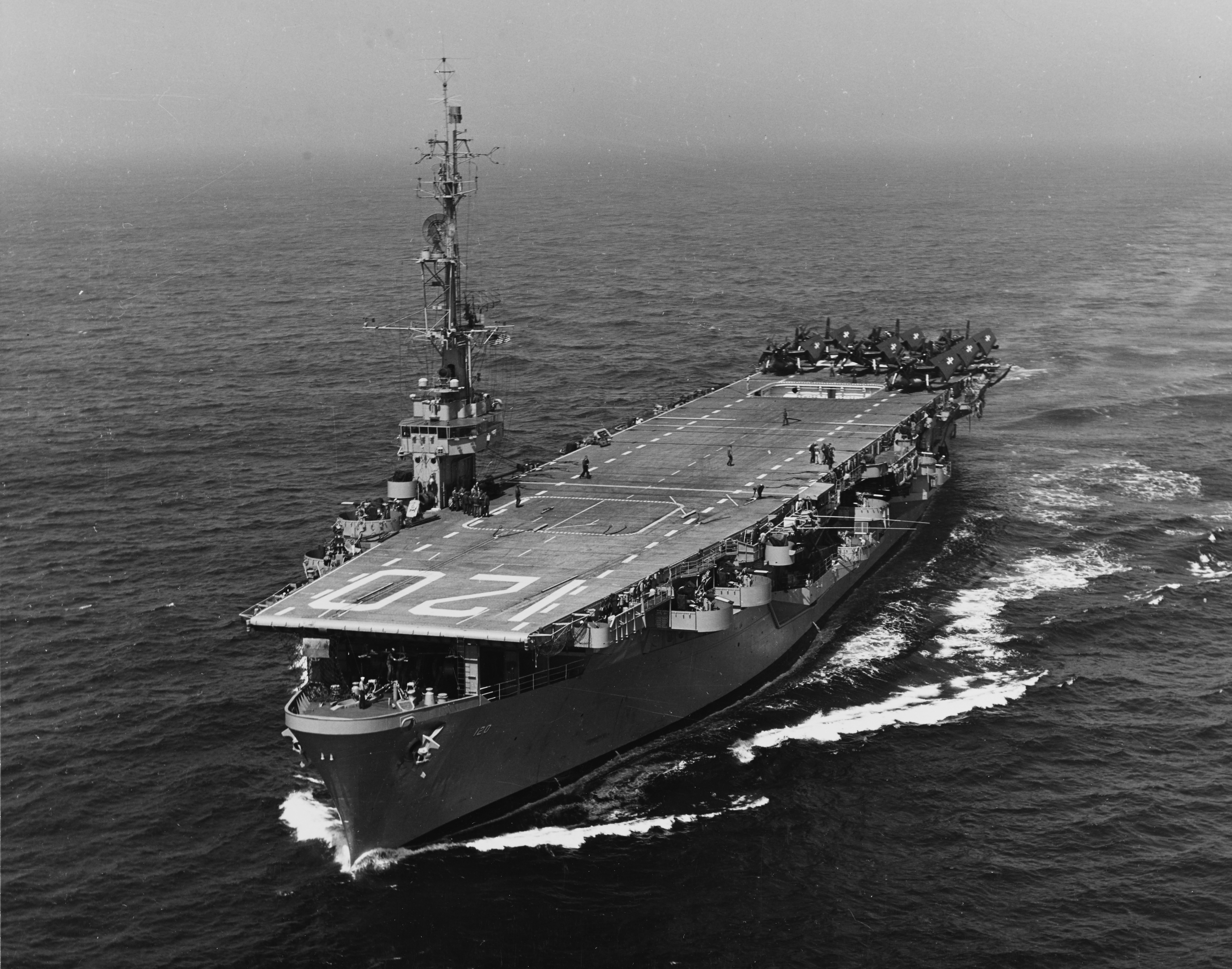
- USS Mindoro (CVE-120) underway in April 1952

History

United States
- Name: USS Mindoro
- Namesake: Battle of Mindoro
- Builder: Todd Pacific Shipyards
- Laid down: 2 January 1945
- Launched: 27 June 1945
- Commissioned: 4 December 1945
- Decommissioned: 4 August 1955
- Stricken: 1 December 1959
- Fate: Sold June 1960, and scrapped in Hong Kong

General characteristics
- Class & type: Commencement Bay-class escort carrier
- Displacement: 21,397 long tons (21,740 t)
- Length: 557 ft 1 in (169.80 m) loa
- Beam: 75 ft (23 m)
- Draft: 32 ft (9.8 m)
- Installed power: 16,000 shp (12,000 kW); 4 × boilers
- Propulsion: 2 × Steam turbines; 2 × screw propellers
- Speed: 19 knots (35 km/h; 22 mph)
- Complement: 1,066
- Armament: 2 × 5 in (127 mm) dual-purpose guns; 36 × 40 mm (1.6 in) Bofors AA guns; 20 × 20 mm (0.8 in) Oerlikon AA guns
- Aircraft carried: 33
- Aviation facilities: 2 × aircraft catapults

USS Mindoro (hull number: CVE-120) was a Commencement Bay-class escort carrier of the United States Navy. The ship was a converted oil tanker, and she had a capacity to carry up to thirty-three aircraft. She was built during World War II, but was completed too late to see action during the conflict. She nevertheless saw service with the 8th Fleet in the late 1940s and early 1950s in the Atlantic Ocean. She also made two deployments to the Mediterranean Sea, in 1950 and 1954, before being decommissioned in January 1955 and assigned to the Atlantic Reserve Fleet. She was retained for just four years before being struck from the naval register in December 1959 and thereafter scrapped.

== Design ==
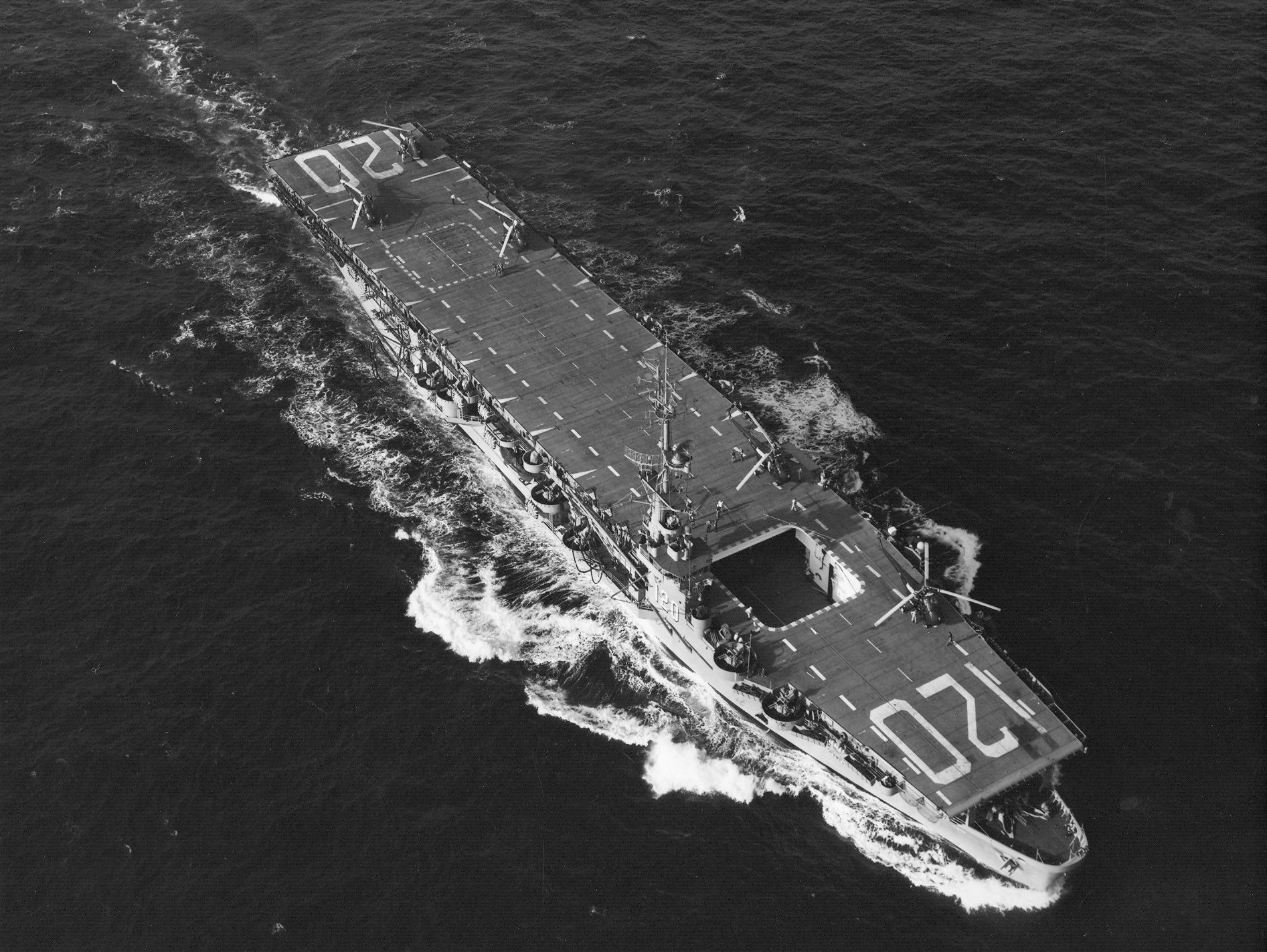
Mindoro underway in 1953

In 1941, as United States participation in World War II became increasingly likely, the US Navy embarked on a construction program for escort carriers, which were converted from transport ships of various types. Many of the escort carrier types were converted from C3-type transports, but the Sangamon-class escort carriers were instead rebuilt oil tankers. These proved to be very successful ships, and the Commencement Bay class, authorized for Fiscal Year 1944, were an improved version of the Sangamon design. The new ships were faster, had improved aviation facilities, and had better internal compartmentation. They proved to be the most successful of the escort carriers, and the only class to be retained in active service after the war, since they were large enough to operate newer aircraft.

Mindoro was 557 ft 1 in (169.80 m) long overall, with a beam of 75 ft (23 m) at the waterline, which extended to 105 ft 2 in (32.05 m) at maximum. She displaced 21,397 long tons (21,740 t) at full load, of which 12,876 long tons (13,083 t) could be fuel oil (though some of her storage tanks were converted to permanently store seawater for ballast), and at full load she had a draft of 27 ft 11 in (8.51 m). The ship's superstructure consisted of a small island. She had a complement of 1,066 officers and enlisted men.

The ship was powered by two Allis-Chalmers geared steam turbines, each driving one screw propeller, using steam provided by four Combustion Engineering-manufactured water-tube boilers. The propulsion system was rated to produce a total of 16,000 shp (12,000 kW) for a top speed of 19 knots (35 km/h; 22 mph). Given the very large storage capacity for oil, the ships of the Commencement Bay class could steam for some 23,900 nautical miles (44,300 km; 27,500 mi) at a speed of 15 knots (28 km/h; 17 mph).

Her defensive anti-aircraft armament consisted of two 5 in (127 mm) dual-purpose guns in single mounts, thirty-six 40 mm (2 in) Bofors guns, and twenty 20 mm (1 in) Oerlikon light AA cannons. The Bofors guns were placed in three quadruple and twelve twin mounts, while the Oerlikon guns were all mounted individually. She carried 33 planes, which could be launched from two aircraft catapults. Two elevators transferred aircraft from the hangar to the flight deck.

== Service history ==
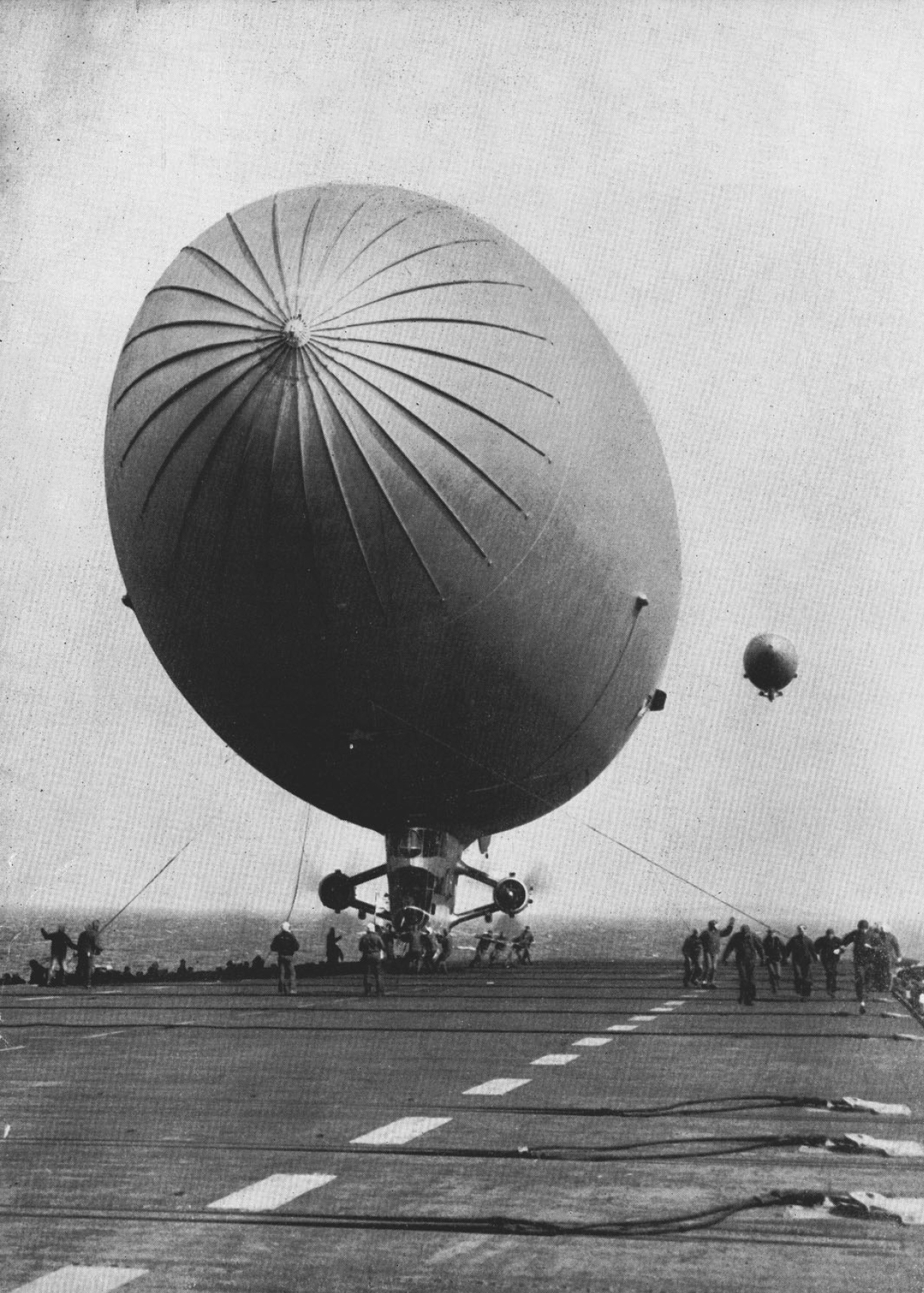
A K-class blimp landing on Mindoro in the 1950s

The first fifteen ships of the Commencement Bay class were ordered on 23 January 1943, allocated to Fiscal Year 1944. The keel for Mindoro was laid down at the Todd-Pacific Shipyards, Inc., in Tacoma, Washington, on 2 January 1945. The completed hull was launched on 27 June 1945. She was commissioned at Tacoma on 4 December 1945, too late to have seen action during the war. The ship was named for the Battle of Mindoro in December 1944. Following her completion, she embarked on a shakedown cruise to test the ship along the West Coast of the United States, that lasted into January 1946; later that month, she departed for the East Coast of the United States, arriving in Norfolk, Virginia, on 15 February. Despite the fact that the United States was demobilizing much of the armed forces that had been assembled during the war, the newly completed Mindoro would be kept in active service.

Mindoro was assigned to Carrier Division 14, which she soon joined for training exercises to practice carrier operations. In May, she sailed to the West Indies, where she took part in large scale maneuvers with ships from 8th Fleet. She spent the rest of the year cruising along the East Coast and as far south as Cuba; during this period, she conducted routine training exercises for her pilots and anti-submarine warfare (ASW) exercises. In the postwar period, the Navy adopted a combined-arms approach to ASW defense for the fleet and the US coast; escort carriers like Mindoro formed hunter-killer groups, which were supported by patrol craft and blimps like the K class. The blimps frequently practiced joint operations with the escort carriers, including landing on the flight deck. She spent the next nine years operating on a similar routine of training exercises and fleet maneuvers, and she was based at Norfolk for this period. In November 1947, she took part in the Civilian Cruise Program, a public relations program the Navy had begun after the end of the war in 1945. George Whelan Anderson Jr. captained Mindoro beginning in July 1948.

She also made trips across the Atlantic to visit Britain, and in 1950, she was sent on a deployment to the Mediterranean Sea for assignment with the 6th Fleet. During the deployment, Mindoro served as part of the ASW screen for the fleet. She also brought her escorting cruisers and destroyers, which further strengthened the fleet. The deployment was in response to the outbreak of the Korean War earlier in 1950; many warships from the 6th Fleet had been transferred to the Pacific to support operations in Korea, so Mindoro's ASW group was sent to reinforce the 6th Fleet. From 1951 to 1952, David L. McDonald served as the ship's commander. In September 1952, Mindoro took part in the major NATO naval exercise, Exercise Mainbrace, off Norway and Denmark. In 1954, she made a second deployment to the Mediterranean with the 6th Fleet.

The ship took part in her final training maneuvers off the Virginia Capes in January 1955, after which she sailed to Boston on the 17th. She was decommissioned there on 4 August and was assigned to the Atlantic Reserve Fleet. By this time, the Navy had begun replacing the Commencement Bay-class ships with much larger Essex-class aircraft carriers, since the former were too small to operate newer and more effective anti-submarine patrol planes. Proposals to radically rebuild the Commencement Bays either with an angled flight deck and various structural improvements or lengthen their hulls by 30 ft (9.1 m) and replace their propulsion machinery to increase speed came to nothing, as they were deemed to be too expensive. Mindoro's hull number was changed to AKV-20 on 7 May 1959, and later that year the navy decided to discard the ship. She was struck from the naval register on 1 December 1959, sold in June 1960, and then towed to Hong Kong later that year, where she was broken up for scrap.
