= Mogford =

Mogford is a surname. Notable people with the surname include:

- John Mogford (1821–1885), British painter
- Steve Mogford (born 1956), British businessman
- Thomas Mogford (born 1977), British author
- Thomas Mogford (1809–1868), British painter
- William Mogford Hamlet (1850-1931), Australian chemist, bushwalker and pedestrian

== See also ==
- Mugford (disambiguation)
