= George Whelan Anderson Jr. =

United States Navy admiral and diplomat (1906–1992)

George W. Anderson
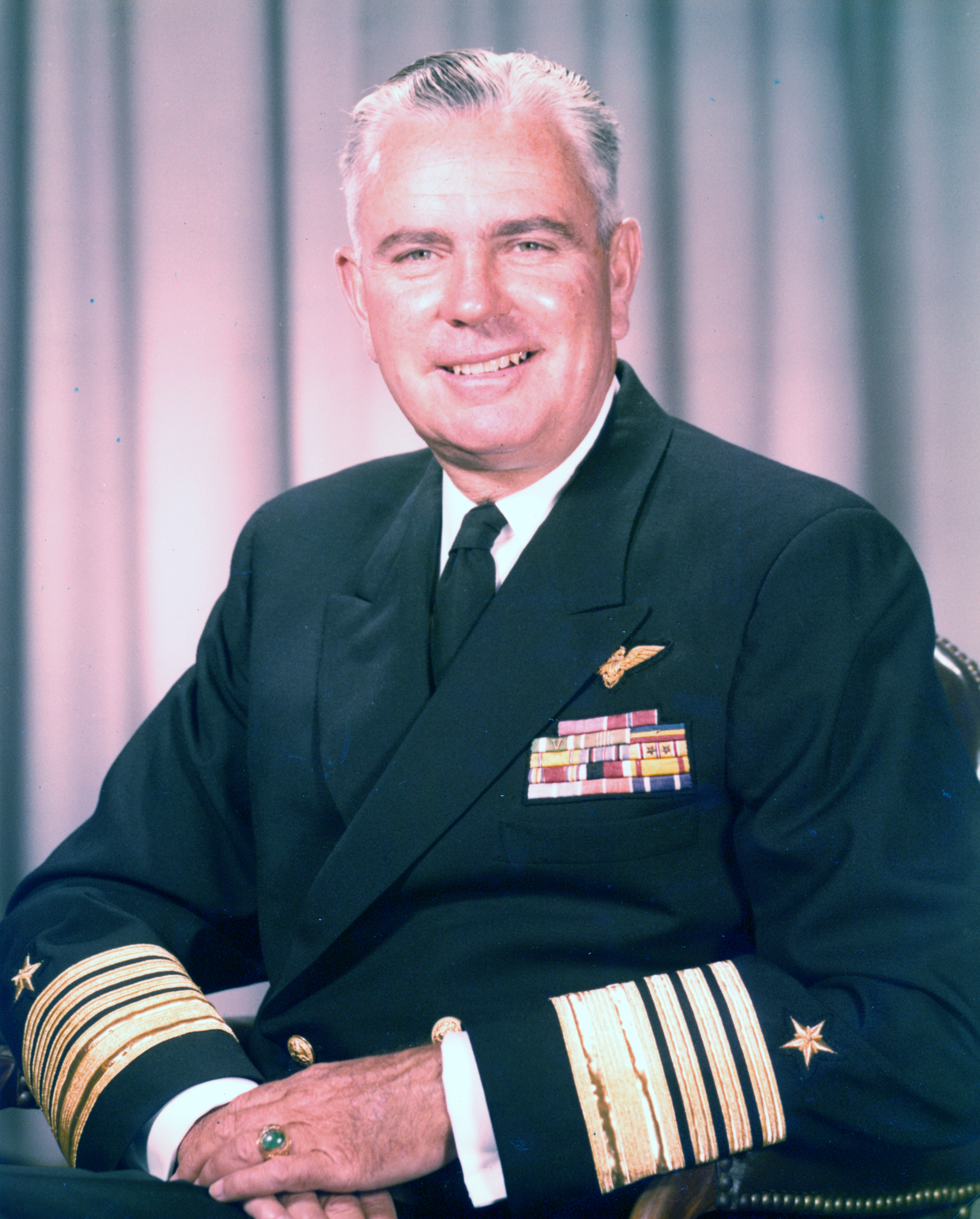

Chair of the President's Intelligence Advisory Board
- In office May 1, 1970 – March 11, 1976
- President: Richard Nixon; Gerald Ford
- Preceded by: Maxwell D. Taylor
- Succeeded by: Leo Cherne

United States Ambassador to Portugal
- In office October 22, 1963 – June 1, 1966
- President: John F. Kennedy; Lyndon B. Johnson
- Preceded by: Charles Elbrick
- Succeeded by: Tapley Bennett

Chief of Naval Operations
- In office August 1, 1961 – August 1, 1963
- President: John F. Kennedy
- Deputy: Claude V. Ricketts
- Preceded by: Arleigh Burke
- Succeeded by: David L. McDonald

Personal details
- Born: December 15, 1906 New York City, U.S.
- Died: March 20, 1992 (aged 85) McLean, Virginia, U.S.
- Education: United States Naval Academy (BSc)

Military service
- Allegiance: United States
- Branch/service: United States Navy
- Years of service: 1927–1963
- Rank: Admiral
- Commands: Chief of Naval Operations; United States Sixth Fleet; Carrier Division 6 Task Force 77; USS Franklin D. Roosevelt; USS Mindoro
- Battles/wars: World War II; Cold War
- Awards: Navy Distinguished Service Medal (2); Legion of Merit; Bronze Star Medal

George Whelan Anderson Jr. (December 15, 1906 – March 20, 1992) was an admiral in the United States Navy and a diplomat. Serving as the Chief of Naval Operations between 1961 and 1963, he was in charge of the US blockade of Cuba during the 1962 Cuban Missile Crisis.

== Early life and career ==
Born in Brooklyn, New York, on December 15, 1906, Anderson attended Brooklyn Preparatory School, entered the United States Naval Academy in 1923 and graduated with the class of 1927. Then, he became a naval aviator and served on cruisers and aircraft carriers, including the USS Cincinnati.

In World War II, Anderson served as the navigator on the fourth USS Yorktown. After the war, he served as the commanding officer of the escort carrier USS Mindoro and of the USS Franklin D. Roosevelt. He also served tours as an assistant to General Dwight Eisenhower at the North Atlantic Treaty Organization, special assistant to the Chairman of the Joint Chiefs of Staff Admiral Arthur W. Radford, and as chief of staff to the Commander in Chief Pacific.

== Flag assignments ==
As a flag officer, Anderson commanded Task Force 77 between Taiwan and Mainland China, Carrier Division 6, in the Mediterranean during the 1958 Lebanon landing and, as a vice admiral, commanded the United States Sixth Fleet.

=== Cuban Missile Crisis ===
As Chief of Naval Operations in charge of the US quarantine of Cuba during the Cuban Missile Crisis in 1962, Anderson distinguished himself in the Navy's conduct of those operations. Time magazine featured him on the cover and called him "an aggressive blue-water sailor of unfaltering competence and uncommon flair." He had, however, a contentious relationship with Secretary of Defense Robert S. McNamara. At one point during the crisis, Anderson ordered McNamara out of the Pentagon's Flag Plot when the Secretary inquired as to the Navy's intended procedures for stopping Soviet submarines; McNamara viewed those actions as mutinous and forced Anderson to retire in 1963. Anderson had a different recollection of the October 24th Flag Plot incident:

We knew where one of these particular [Soviet] submarines was located...We had a destroyer sitting on top of this submarine. One evening, McNamara, [Deputy Secretary of Defense Ross] Gilpatric, and an entourage of his press people came down to flag plot and, in the course of their interrogations, they asked why that destroyer was out of line [the picket line of quarantine]...After some discussion, I said to McNamara—he kept pressing me— ’’Come inside,” and I took him into a little inner sanctuary [because the press people were not cleared for the classified submarine tracking information] and I explained the whole thing to him and to his satisfaction, as well. He left, and we walked down the corridor, and I said: “Well, Mr. Secretary, you go back to your office and I’ll go to mine and we’ll take care of things,”...which apparently was the wrong thing to say to somebody of McNamara’s personality...The story was leaked to the press through his own public information people that I had insulted him by making this remark over the incident in flag plot.

Anderson would later accuse McNamara of micromanagement during the Crisis.

Decades later, the role of Vasily Arkhipov became widely known, as the last person standing in the way of Admiral Anderson's procedures unintentionally triggering nuclear war.

=== USS Thresher loss ===
Anderson had another conflict with McNamara six months after the Missile Crisis. Anderson obtained approval from Secretary of the Navy Fred Korth to do a press briefing the day after the loss of the nuclear submarine Thresher. At the end, he later stated

I got up to leave, and I got wild applause. Then I went up to the office, and pretty soon the word came back that the members of the press had said it was the first decent press conference that the Office of the Secretary of Defense had had since the administration had been in — which did not enhance my relationship with the Office of the Secretary of Defense.

== Later career ==
Anderson took early retirement, largely because of the ongoing conflict with Secretary of Defense Robert McNamara.

John F. Kennedy subsequently appointed Anderson Ambassador to Portugal, where he served for three years and encouraged plans for the peaceful transition of Portugal's African colonies to independence. He later returned to government service from 1973 to 1977 as member and later chairman of the President's Foreign Intelligence Advisory Board.

After his retirement from the navy, Anderson was chairman of Lamar Advertising Company, an outdoor advertising company, and he was a director on the boards of Value Line, National Airlines and Crown Seal and Cork.

== Family and death ==
Anderson's first wife was Muriel Buttling (1911–1947). They had two sons and a daughter.

Anderson died on March 20, 1992, of congestive heart failure, at the age of 85, in McLean, Virginia. He was survived by his second wife of 44 years, the former Mary Lee Sample (née Anderson), the widow of William Sample; a daughter; a stepdaughter; four grandchildren; nine great-grandchildren; and three great-great-grandchildren. He was buried on March 23, 1992, in Section 1 of Arlington National Cemetery.

== Cultural depictions ==
Anderson was portrayed by Kenneth Tobey in The Missiles of October and Madison Mason in Thirteen Days (film).

== Awards ==
- Navy Distinguished Service Medal with gold star
- Legion of Merit
- Bronze Star Medal
- Navy Commendation Medal with "V" device
- Army Commendation Medal
- Presidential Unit Citation with bronze star
- American Defense Service Medal
- American Campaign Medal
- Asiatic-Pacific Campaign Medal with two battle stars
- World War II Victory Medal
- Navy Occupation Medal
- China Service Medal
- National Defense Service Medal with star

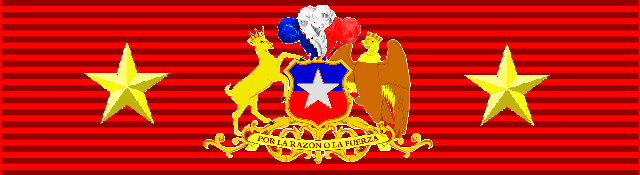

1st Row	Navy Distinguished Service Medal w/1 award star		Legion of Merit
2nd row	Bronze Star Medal	Navy and Marine Corps Commendation Medal w/Combat "V" Valor device	Army Commendation Medal
3rd row	Presidential Medal of Freedom w/1 award star	American Defense Service Medal w/1 service star	American Campaign Medal
4th row	Asiatic-Pacific Campaign Medal w/2 service stars	World War II Victory Medal	Navy Occupation Service Medal
5th row	China Service Medal	National Defense Service Medal	Order of the British Empire
6th row	Order of Precious Tripod with Special Rosette	Unidentified	Grand Cross of Royal Order of Phoenix (Grand Cross)
7th row	Cross of the Knight Commanders, Royal Order George I	Military Order of Christ	Great Star of Military Merit of Chile
8th row	Order of Naval Merit (first class) of Venezuela	Order of Naval Merit, Grand Officer	Commander of the Legion of Honour
9th row	Maltese Cross; the Order of Prince Henry the Navigator of Portugal	Grand Cross of Military Merit of Portugal	Great Cross of the Order of Merit of Italy

== Sources ==
- Anderson, George W. (1983). Oral History Reminiscences, Vol. 2. United States Naval Institute.
- Anderson, George W. (September 1987). "As I Recall...The Cuban Missile Crisis". Proceedings. 113/9. United States Naval Institute. ISSN 0041-798X.
- Stierman, Joseph William (1964). "Public relations aspects of a major disaster: a case study of the loss of USS Thresher" (PDF). Boston University.

Military offices
Preceded by Arleigh Burke	Chief of Naval Operations; 1961–1963	Succeeded by David L. McDonald
Diplomatic posts
Preceded by Charles Elbrick	United States Ambassador to Portugal; 1963–1966	Succeeded by Tapley Bennett
Government offices
Preceded by Maxwell D. Taylor	Chair of the President's Intelligence Advisory Board; 1969–1976	Succeeded by Leo Cherne
