= USS Fargo (CL-106) =

Light cruiser of the United States Navy

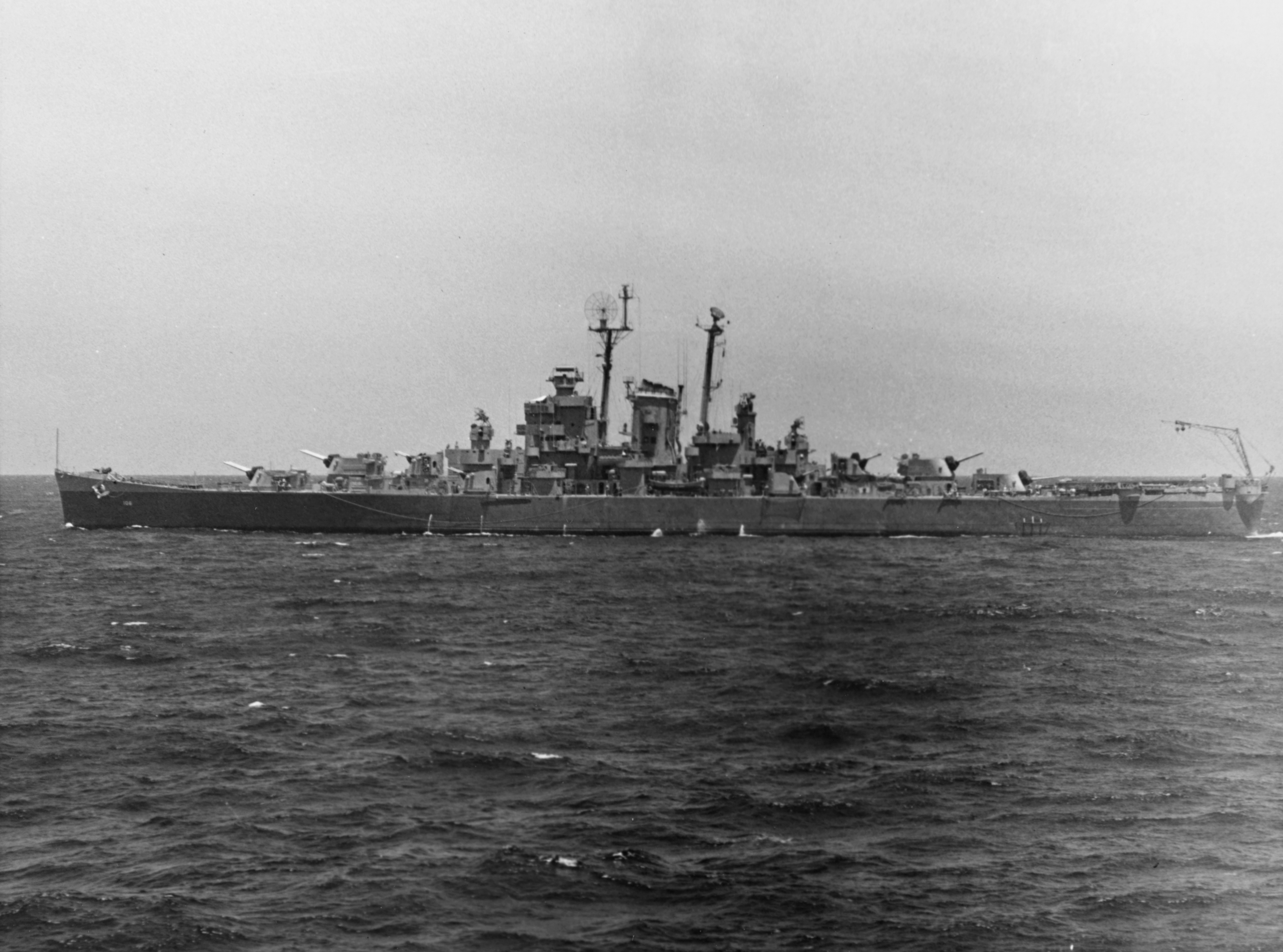
- USS Fargo (CL-106), underway at sea, 8 May 1946.

History

United States
- Name: Fargo
- Namesake: City of Fargo, North Dakota
- Builder: New York Shipbuilding Corporation, Camden, New Jersey
- Laid down: 23 August 1943
- Launched: 25 February 1945
- Sponsored by: Mrs. F. O. Olsen
- Commissioned: 9 December 1945
- Decommissioned: 14 February 1950
- Stricken: 1 March 1970
- Identification: Hull symbol:CL-106; Code letters:NAUO
- Fate: Sold for scrap, 18 August 1971

General characteristics
- Class & type: Fargo-class light cruiser
- Displacement: 11,744 long tons (11,932 t) (standard); 14,131 long tons (14,358 t) (max)
- Length: 610 ft 1 in (185.95 m) oa; 608 ft (185 m)pp
- Beam: 66 ft 4 in (20.22 m)
- Draft: 25 ft 6 in (7.77 m) (mean); 25 ft (7.6 m) (max)
- Installed power: 4 × 634 psi Steam boilers; 100,000 shp (75,000 kW)
- Propulsion: 4 × geared turbines; 4 × screws
- Speed: 32.5 kn (37.4 mph; 60.2 km/h)
- Range: 11,000 nmi (20,000 km) at 15 kn (17 mph; 28 km/h)
- Complement: 1,255 officers and enlisted
- Armament: 4 × triple 6 in (150 mm)/47 caliber Mark 16 guns; 6 × dual 5 in (130 mm)/38 caliber anti-aircraft guns; 4 × quad 40 mm (1.6 in) Bofors anti-aircraft guns; 6 × dual 40 mm (1.6 in) Bofors anti-aircraft guns; 10 × single 20 mm (0.79 in) Oerlikon anti-aircraft cannons
- Armor: Belt: 3 1/2–5 in (89–127 mm); Deck: 2 in (51 mm); Barbettes: 6 in (150 mm); Turrets: 1 1/2–6 in (38–152 mm); Conning Tower: 2 1/4–5 in (57–127 mm)
- Aircraft carried: 4 × floatplanes
- Aviation facilities: 2 × stern catapults

USS Fargo (CL-106), named after the city of Fargo, North Dakota, was the lead ship of her class of light cruisers of the United States Navy, most of which were canceled due to the end of World War II.

The Fargo-class cruisers were a modified version of the previous Cleveland-class cruiser design; the main difference was a more compact pyramidal superstructure with a single trunked funnel, intended to improve AA gun arcs of fire.

The cruiser was launched 25 February 1945 by New York Shipbuilding Corporation, Camden, New Jersey, sponsored by Mrs. F. O. Olsen, and commissioned 9 December 1945.

== Service history ==
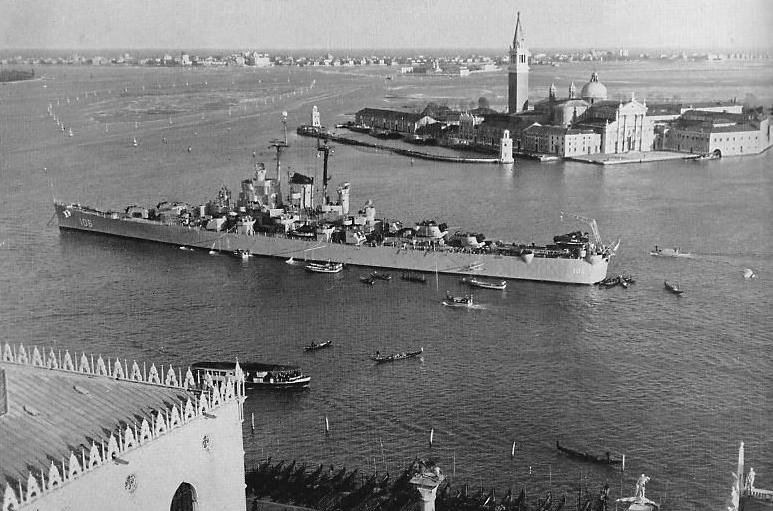
USS Fargo at Venice in 1949.

Fargo sailed from Philadelphia on 15 April 1946, with Vice Admiral Bernard H. Bieri embarked for a goodwill cruise to Bermuda, Trinidad, Recife, Rio de Janeiro and Montevideo, from which she took departure on 31 May for the Mediterranean. During this tour of duty, she visited a variety of ports in Turkey, Lebanon, Greece, Italy, and France, as well as North Africa and served as American representative at Trieste, then troubled by dissension between Italy and Yugoslavia over the city's status.

Returning to New York City on 2 March 1947, Fargo sailed once more for the Mediterranean on 20 May, and during this tour of duty, served for one month as flagship for Commander, Naval Forces Mediterranean. Returning to Newport on 13 September, she prepared for extensive Atlantic Fleet exercises in October and November in the waters from Bermuda to Newfoundland, during which she carried Vice Admiral Arthur W. Radford, Commander 2nd Task Fleet.

Through her remaining two years of service, Fargo completed two more tours of duty in the Mediterranean, and twice joined in large scale exercises in the Caribbean. She was decommissioned and placed in reserve, berthed at Bayonne, New Jersey, 14 February 1950, stricken from the Naval Vessel Register on 1 March 1970, and sold on 18 August 1971 to Union Minerals and Alloys Corporation, Kearney, New Jersey.

A large model of the USS Fargo was on display at the main branch of the Fargo Public Library for many years. The model was moved to the Cass County Historical Society at Bonanzaville before being moved to the Fargo air and space museum.

== See also ==
Hull CL-85 was to be named Fargo, but was converted to Langley (CVL-27), an Independence-class light aircraft carrier, during construction.
