= David L. McDonald =

United States admiral

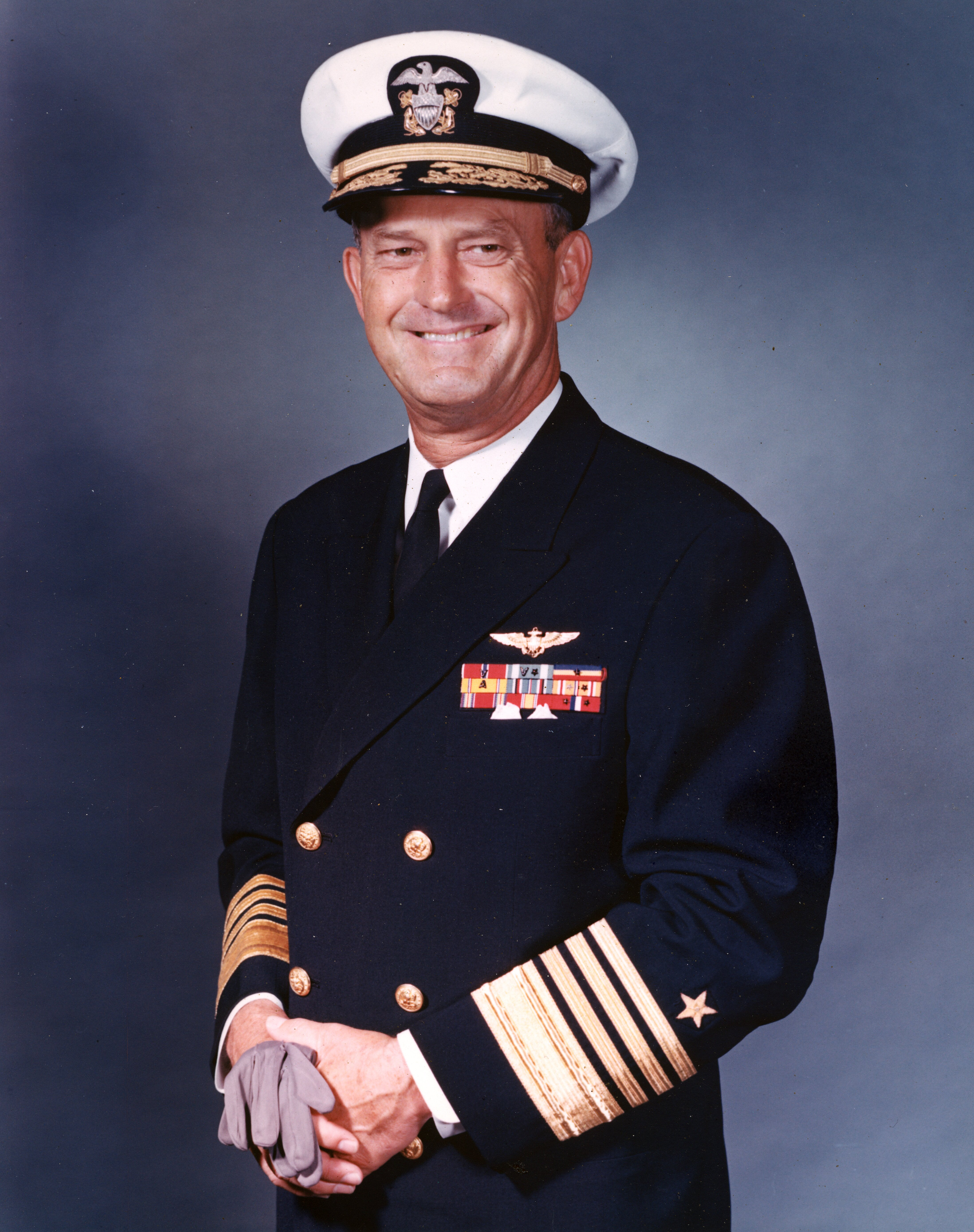
- Admiral David L. McDonald
- Born: September 12, 1906; Maysville, Georgia, US
- Died: December 16, 1997 (aged 91); Jacksonville Beach, Florida, US
- Military career
- Branch: United States Navy
- Service years: 1928–1967
- Rank: Admiral
- Commands: Chief of Naval Operations; United States Sixth Fleet; USS Coral Sea; USS Mindoro
- Conflicts: World War II; Vietnam War
- Awards: Navy Distinguished Service Medal (2); Legion of Merit; Bronze Star Medal; Navy Commendation Medal

David Lamar McDonald (September 12, 1906 – December 16, 1997) was an admiral in the United States Navy, who served as the 17th Chief of Naval Operations from 1 August 1963 to 1 August 1967 during the Vietnam War era.

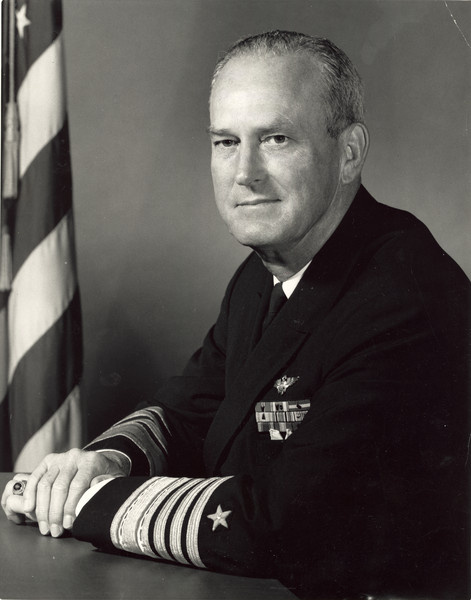
Admiral David L. McDonald

== Early life and education ==
McDonald was born in Maysville, Georgia, on September 12, 1906. He originally sought to go to the United States Military Academy, receiving a nomination from Representative Thomas Montgomery Bell of the 9th Congressional District. After learning he was 2 months and 12 days too young, he opted to attend Riverside Military Academy first, then entered the United States Naval Academy, graduating in 1928.

== Naval career ==
Before becoming a naval aviator, McDonald was assigned to the battleship USS Mississippi and the battleship USS Colorado. He spent three years, from 1935 to 1938, as a flight instructor at Naval Air Station Pensacola in Pensacola, Florida. Between 1938 and 1955, he served as flag secretary of the aircraft command of the United States Atlantic Fleet, commander of the Naval Operational Training Command, executive officer of the aircraft carrier USS Essex in the Pacific and assistant chief of staff for operations of the United States Pacific Fleet.

From 1951 to 1952, McDonald served as the commander of the escort carrier USS Mindoro. During the mid-1950s, McDonald commanded the aircraft carrier USS Coral Sea. In the early 1960s, before becoming Chief of Naval Operations, he served as Commander, United States Sixth Fleet. At the time of his selection as Chief of Naval Operations, he was the youngest full admiral in the navy, and had only received his fourth star a month prior.

While serving as the Chief of Naval Operations, he denounced the alleged cover-up surrounding the 1967 USS Liberty incident: “I think that much of this is extraneous and it leaves me with the feeling that we’re trying our best to excuse the attackers…Were I a parent of one of the deceased this release would burn me up. I myself do not subscribe to it.”

In 1976, nearly a decade after he retired, McDonald wrote in his autobiography of his participation in the escalation of the Vietnam War:

Maybe we military men were all weak. Maybe we should have stood up and pounded the table... I was part of it and I'm sort of ashamed of myself too. At times I wonder, "why did I go along with this stuff?"

The airfield at Naval Station Mayport, Florida, is named after McDonald.

== Awards ==
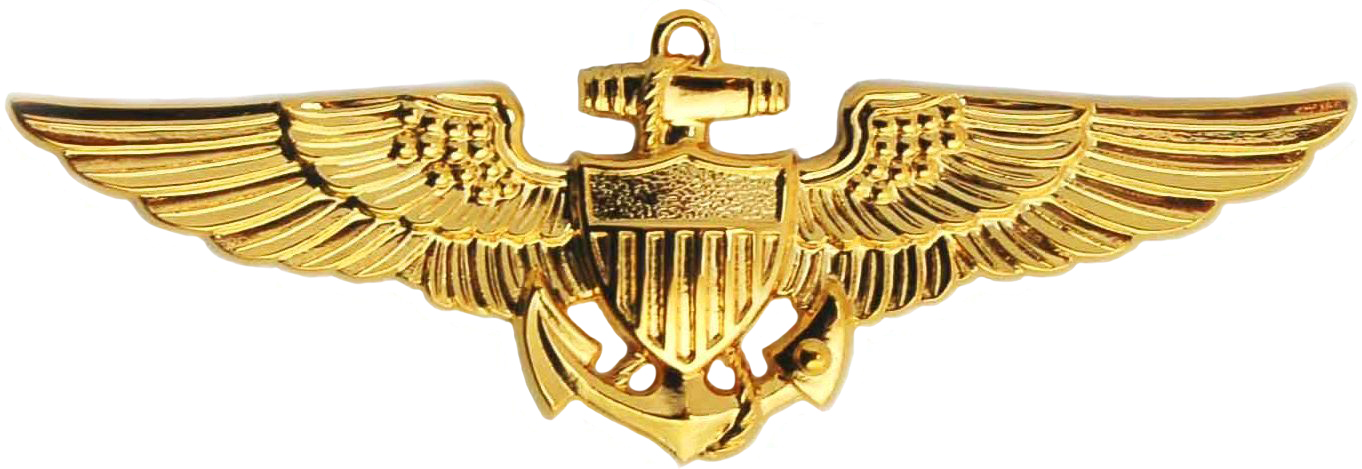

Naval Aviator Badge
Navy Distinguished Service Medal w/ 5/16" gold star
Legion of Merit	Bronze Star Medal w/ Combat 'V'	Navy Commendation Medal w/ Combat 'V' and 5/16" gold star
Navy Presidential Unit Citation w/ 3/16" bronze star	China Service Medal	American Defense Service Medal w/ "A" device
American Campaign Medal	Asiatic-Pacific Campaign Medal w/ 3/16" silver and bronze stars	World War II Victory Medal
Navy Occupation Service Medal w/ 'Japan' clasp	National Defense Service Medal w/ one 3/16" bronze star	Philippine Liberation Medal w/ two 3/16" bronze stars

Military offices
Preceded by George W. Anderson Jr.	Chief of Naval Operations; 1963–1967	Succeeded by Thomas H. Moorer
