= Arleigh Burke =

US Navy admiral (1901–1996)

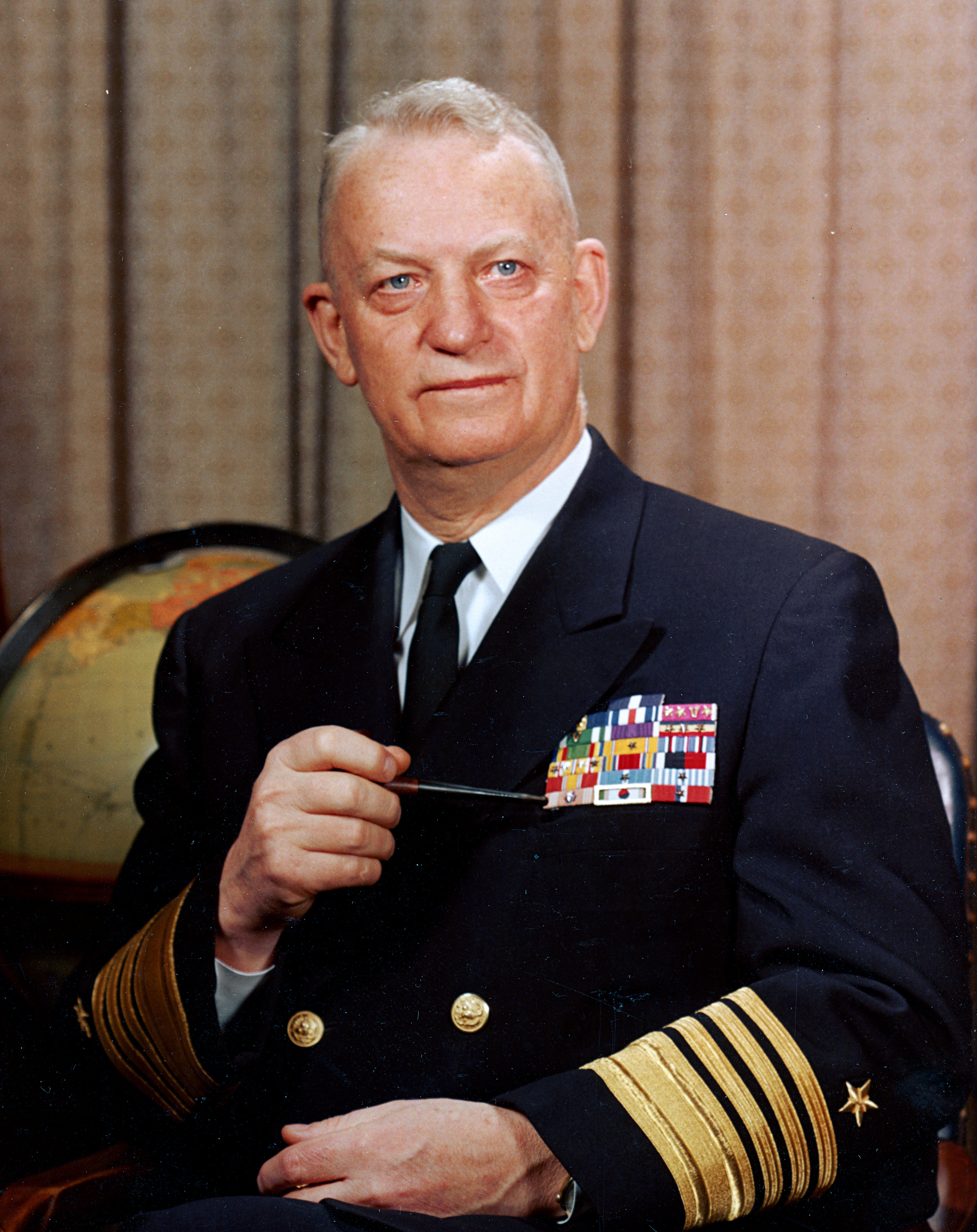
- Burke in 1958
- Born: Arleigh Albert Burke; October 19, 1901; Boulder, Colorado, U.S.
- Died: January 1, 1996 (aged 94); Bethesda, Maryland, U.S.
- Burial place: United States Naval Academy Cemetery (Section 8)
- Education: US Naval Academy (1923) University of Michigan (MS/1931)
- Military career
- Branch: United States Navy
- Service years: 1923–1961
- Rank: Admiral
- Nicknames: "31-knot Burke"
- Commands: Chief of Naval Operations; Cruiser Division Six; Cruiser Division Five; USS Huntington (CL-107); Destroyer Squadron 23; USS Charles Ausburne (DD-570); Destroyer Squadron 12; Destroyer Division 44; Destroyer Division 43; USS Mugford
- Conflicts: World War II; Bougainville campaign; Battle of Empress Augusta Bay; Battle of Cape St. George; Korean War
- Awards: Navy Cross; Navy Distinguished Service Medal (3); Silver Star; Legion of Merit (4, with Combat V); Presidential Medal of Freedom

Arleigh Albert Burke (October 19, 1901 – January 1, 1996) was an admiral of the United States Navy who distinguished himself during World War II and the Korean War, and who served as Chief of Naval Operations during the Eisenhower and Kennedy administrations.

USS Arleigh Burke (DDG-51), the lead ship of the Arleigh Burke-class destroyers with Aegis Combat System-equipped guided missiles, was commissioned in Burke's honor in 1991. It was only the fifth time the honor of naming a US naval vessel after a living figure had been bestowed since 1861.

== Early life and naval career ==
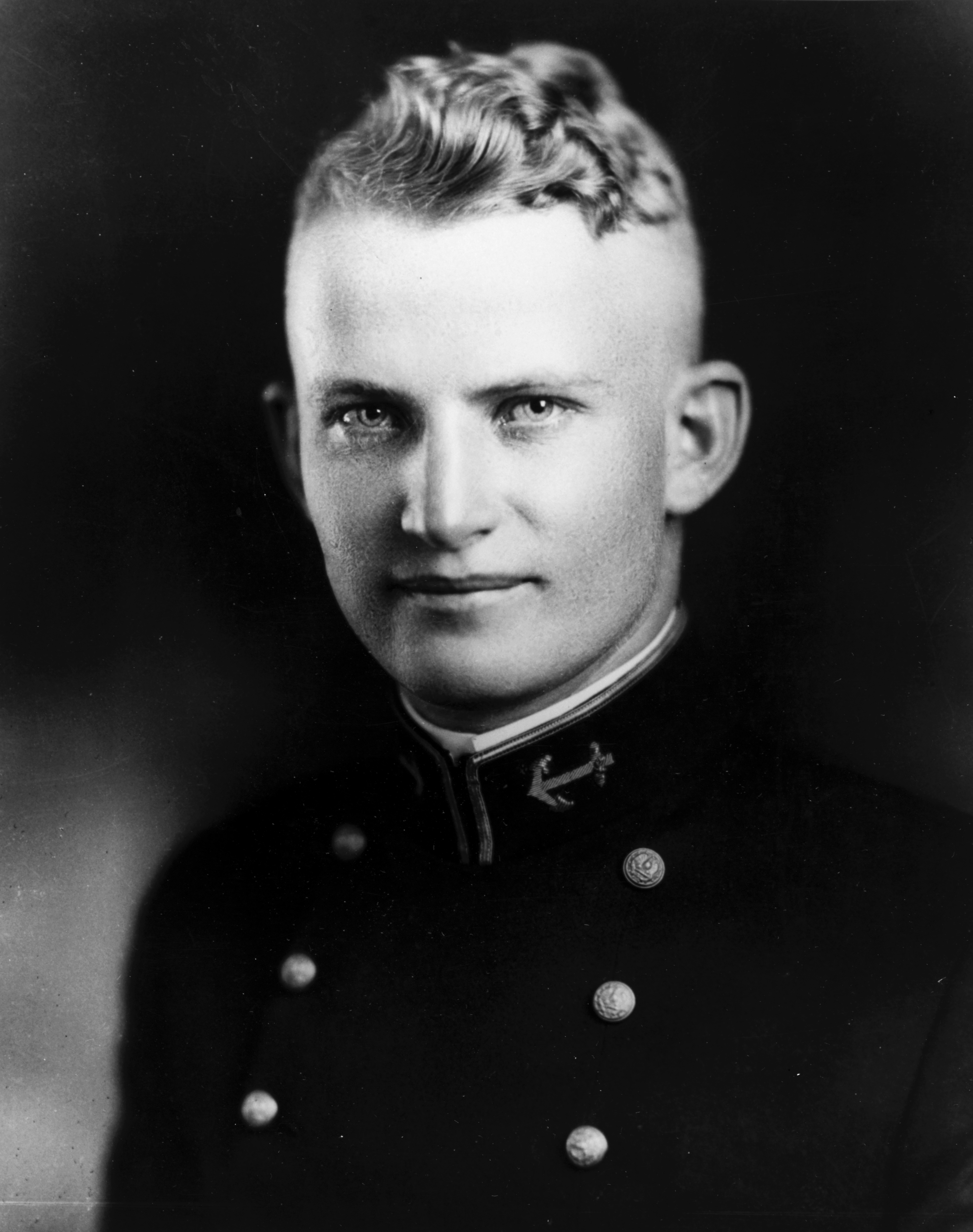
Arleigh Burke. Taken in 1920 while he was attending the U.S. Naval Academy.

Burke was born in Boulder, Colorado, on October 19, 1901, to Oscar Burke and Clara Mokler. His grandfather, August Björkgren, was a Swedish immigrant to the US and changed his surname to 'Burke', a common American surname of Irish origin, to sound more American. Due to the 1918 influenza outbreak, schools were closed in Boulder and he never graduated from high school. Burke won an alternate nomination to the United States Naval Academy given by his local congressman. He was then appointed by the Secretary of the Navy on behalf of the President. During his time at the academy, Burke was a member of 23rd Company. He graduated from the academy in June 1923, and was commissioned as an ensign in the United States Navy. He married Roberta Gorsuch (1899–1997) of Washington, D.C.

Over the next 18 years, Burke served aboard battleships and destroyers, and earned a Master of Science degree in chemical engineering at the University of Michigan in 1931. When World War II came, he found himself, to his great disappointment, in a shore billet at the Naval Gun Factory in Washington, D.C. After persistent efforts on his part, in 1943 he received orders to join the fighting in the South Pacific.

== World War II ==
Burke spent the remainder of the war in the South Pacific. He successively commanded Destroyer Division 43, Destroyer Division 44, Destroyer Squadron 12, and Destroyer Squadron 23. DesRon 23, known as the "Little Beavers", covered the initial landings in Bougainville in November 1943, and fought in 22 separate engagements during the next four months. During this time, the Little Beavers were credited with destroying one Japanese cruiser, nine destroyers, one submarine, several smaller ships, and approximately 30 aircraft. Burke's standing orders to his task force were, "Destroyers to attack on enemy contact WITHOUT ORDERS from the task force commander." After reviewing the Navy's early unsuccessful engagements with the Japanese, he concluded that uncertainty and hesitation had cost them dearly. The lesson was driven home to him at the Battle of Blackett Strait, when his radar operator made first contact with a ship near the shore but Burke hesitated to fire. A battle soon unfolded which ended in a US victory, which only Burke was unhappy with. Reflecting on the events Burke asked a nearby ensign what the difference was between a good officer and a poor one. After listening to the ensign's response, Burke offered his own: "The difference between a good officer and a poor one," said Burke, "is about ten seconds."

Burke usually pushed his destroyers to just under boiler-bursting speed, but while en route to a rendezvous prior to the Battle of Cape St. George the USS Spence became a boiler casualty (a boiler tube was blocked by a brush used for cleaning), limiting Burke's squadron to 31 knots, rather than the 34+ of which they were otherwise capable. His nickname was "31 Knot Burke," originally a taunt, later a popular symbol of his hard-charging nature. An alternative explanation is provided by Jean Edward Smith in his biography of Eisenhower: "During World War Two, Burke mistakenly led his destroyer squadron into a Japanese minefield. Admiral Halsey radioed to ask what he was doing in a Japanese minefield. 'Thirty-one knots,' replied Burke".

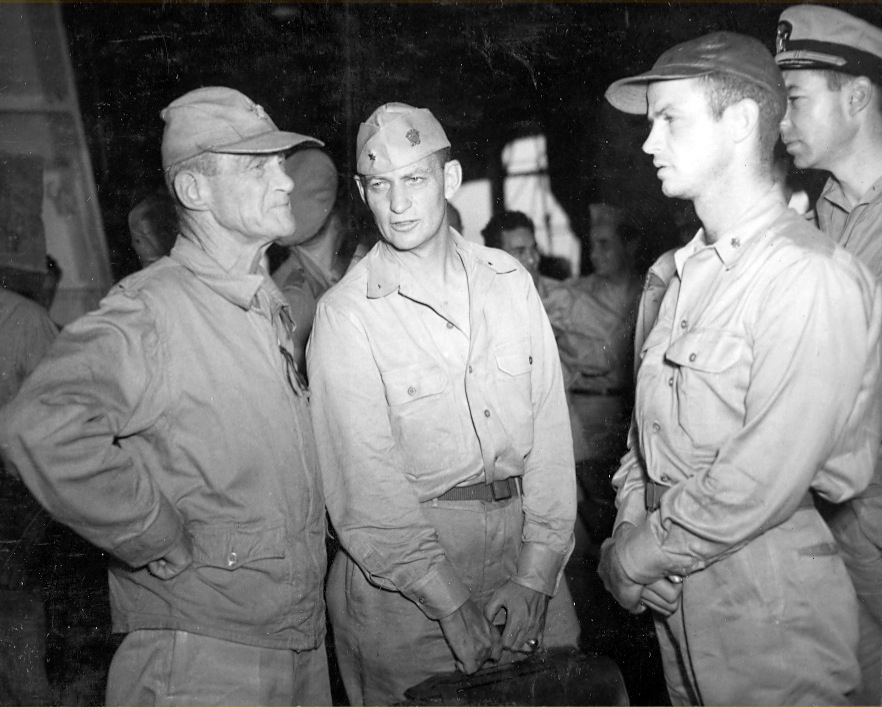
Admiral Marc Mitscher and Chief of Staff Arleigh Burke transfer over to Enterprise after Bunker Hill is hit twice by kamikazes.

In March 1944, Burke was promoted to Chief of Staff to the Commander of Task Force 58, the Fifth Fleet's Fast Carrier Task Force, which was commanded by Admiral Marc Mitscher. The transfer stemmed from a directive from the Chief of Naval Operations, Admiral Ernest King, that required a surface commander such as Admiral Raymond A. Spruance to have an aviator as Chief of Staff, and an air commander, such as Mitscher, to have a surface officer as Chief of Staff. Neither Mitscher nor Burke were happy with the arrangement, but as time passed Burke realized he had been given one of the most important assignments in the Navy, and his hard work and diligence eventually caused Mitscher to warm to him. Burke was promoted to the temporary rank of Commodore, and participated in all the force's naval engagements until June 1945, near the end of the war. He was aboard both USS Bunker Hill and USS Enterprise when they were hit by Japanese kamikaze aircraft during the Okinawa campaign.

After the end of the war, Burke reverted to his permanent rank of captain and continued his naval career by serving in a number of capacities, including once more as Admiral Mitscher's chief of staff, until the latter's death in 1947. Burke then took command of the cruiser USS Huntington for a cruise down the east coast of Africa. He was promoted to rear admiral in 1949 and served as Navy Secretary on the Defense Research and Development Board.

== Korean War ==
At the outbreak of the Korean War, Admiral Forrest Sherman, then Chief of Naval Operations, ordered Burke to duty as Deputy Chief of Staff to Commander Naval Forces Far East. From there, he assumed command of Cruiser Division Five, and, in July 1951, was made a member of the United Nations Truce Delegation which negotiated with the Communists for military armistice in Korea. After six months in the truce tents, he returned to the Office of Chief of Naval Operations where he served as Director of Strategic Plans Division until 1954.

In April 1954, he took command of Cruiser Division Six, then moved in January 1955 to command Destroyer Force Atlantic Fleet (DesLant). In August 1955, Burke succeeded Admiral Robert B. Carney as Chief of Naval Operations. At the time of his appointment as Chief of Naval Operations, Burke was still a rear admiral (two stars) and was promoted over the heads of many flag officers who were senior to him. Burke had never served as a vice admiral (three stars), so he was promoted two grades at the time of his appointment.

== Chief of Naval Operations ==
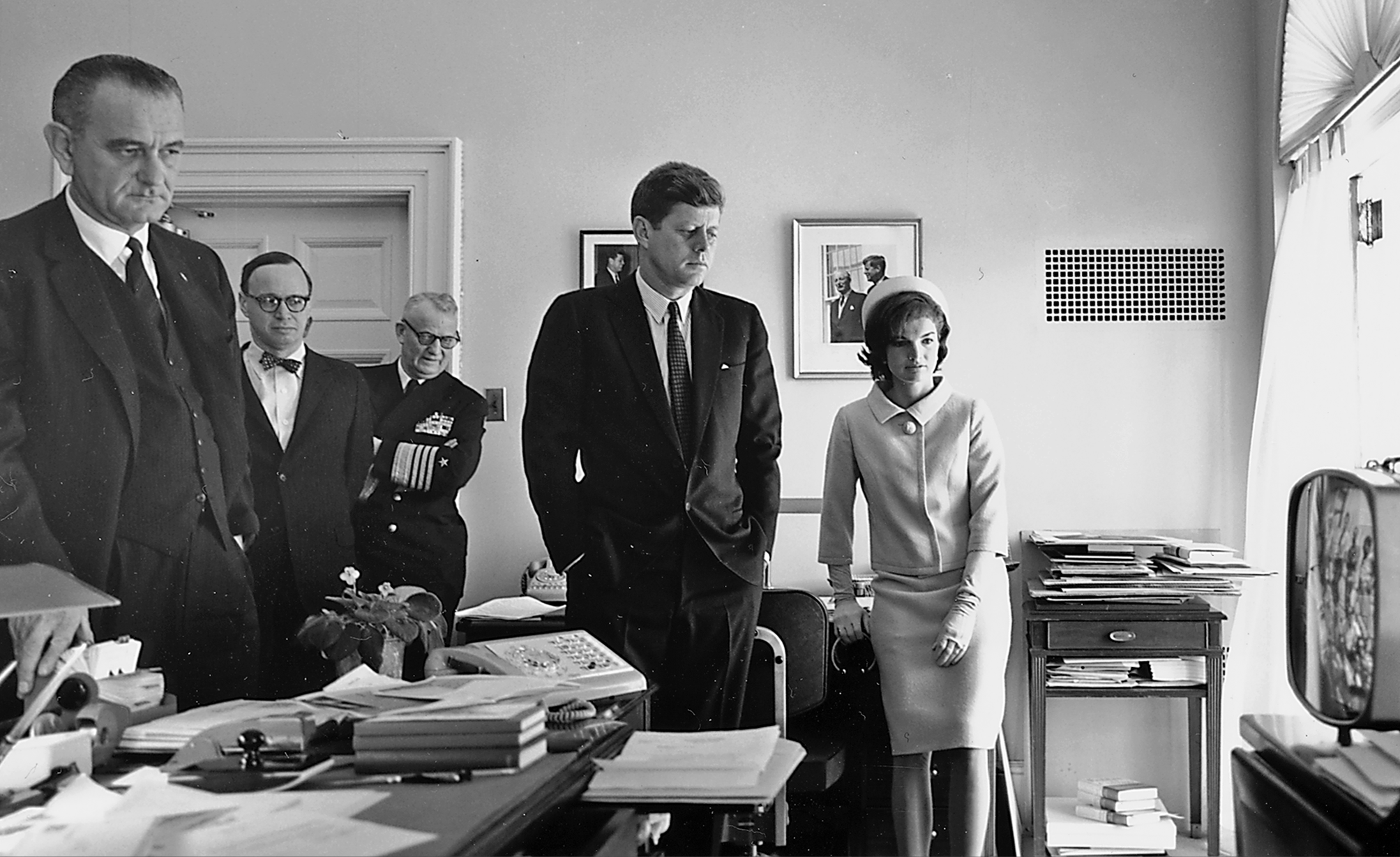
Admiral Burke (middle) watching flight of Mercury-Redstone 3 with President Kennedy, Vice President Johnson, Jackie Kennedy, and Arthur Schlesinger in the White House Office of the President's Secretary, May 5, 1961.

Burke took the post of Chief of Naval Operations in May, 1955, with significant reservations. He served at a critical time in world history, during the depths of the Cold War. He was relatively young, age 53, compared to other flag officers at the time. He was a hard worker, and seemingly tireless, working fifteen-hour work days six days a week as a norm.

He was also an excellent leader and manager, and his ability to create an effective organization were keys to his success. He supported the notoriously demanding Admiral Hyman Rickover in the development of a nuclear-powered submarine force, and instituted the development of submarine-launched ballistic missiles, which led to the Polaris missile program, headed by Burke's selectee Rear Admiral W. F. "Red" Raborn. Burke convened the Project Nobska anti-submarine warfare conference in 1956 at the suggestion of Columbus Iselin II, director of the Woods Hole Oceanographic Institution, where discussion ranged from oceanography to nuclear weapons. At the conference, a statement by Edward Teller that a physically small one-megaton warhead suitable for Polaris could be developed led to Burke's adoption of Polaris over Jupiter. At a time when others in the Navy were very skeptical of the idea of a missile launched from a submarine, Burke succeeded in developing the single most effective deterrent to a nuclear attack on the United States. By 1961 routine Polaris deterrent patrols were in progress and a rapid construction program of Polaris submarines was underway.

Burke as Chief of Naval Operations was intimately involved in the Eisenhower administration discussions on limiting the size of the submarine force. Asked "how much is enough?", as to the number of US ballistic missile submarines needed for deterrence, Burke argued that a force of around 40 Polaris submarines (each with 16 missiles) was a reasonable answer. Burke further argued that land-based missiles and bombers were vulnerable to attack, which made the U.S.-Soviet nuclear balance dangerously unstable. By contrast, nuclear submarines were virtually undetectable and invulnerable. He was very critical of "hair trigger" or "launch on warning" nuclear strategies, and he warned that such strategies were "dangerous for any nation."

Burke served an unprecedented three terms as Chief of Naval Operations during a period of growth and progress in the Navy. Upon completing his third term, he was transferred to the Retired List on August 1, 1961.

== Last years ==
He was a member of the anti-Castro organization, Citizens Committee for a Free Cuba.

Burke, of Swedish descent, was the senior representative of the United States of America at the funeral of King Gustaf VI Adolf of Sweden in 1973.

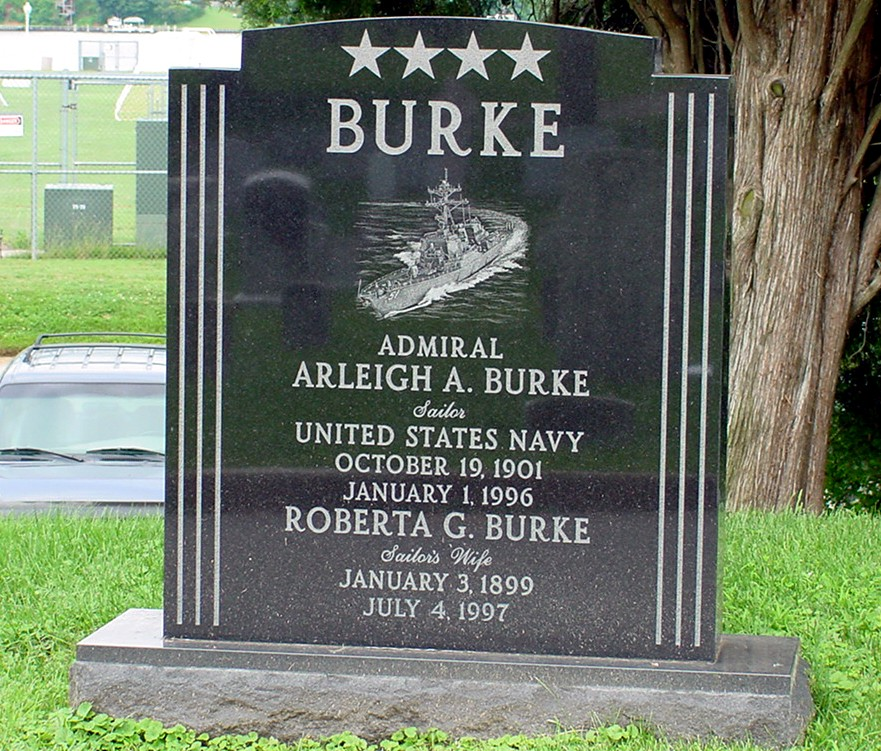
Arleigh Burke's grave at the United States Naval Academy Cemetery

Arleigh Burke died on January 1, 1996, at the National Naval Medical Center in Bethesda, Maryland. He was 94 years old. He is buried at the United States Naval Academy Cemetery, in Annapolis, Maryland.

== Awards and honors ==
=== Ship class namesake ===
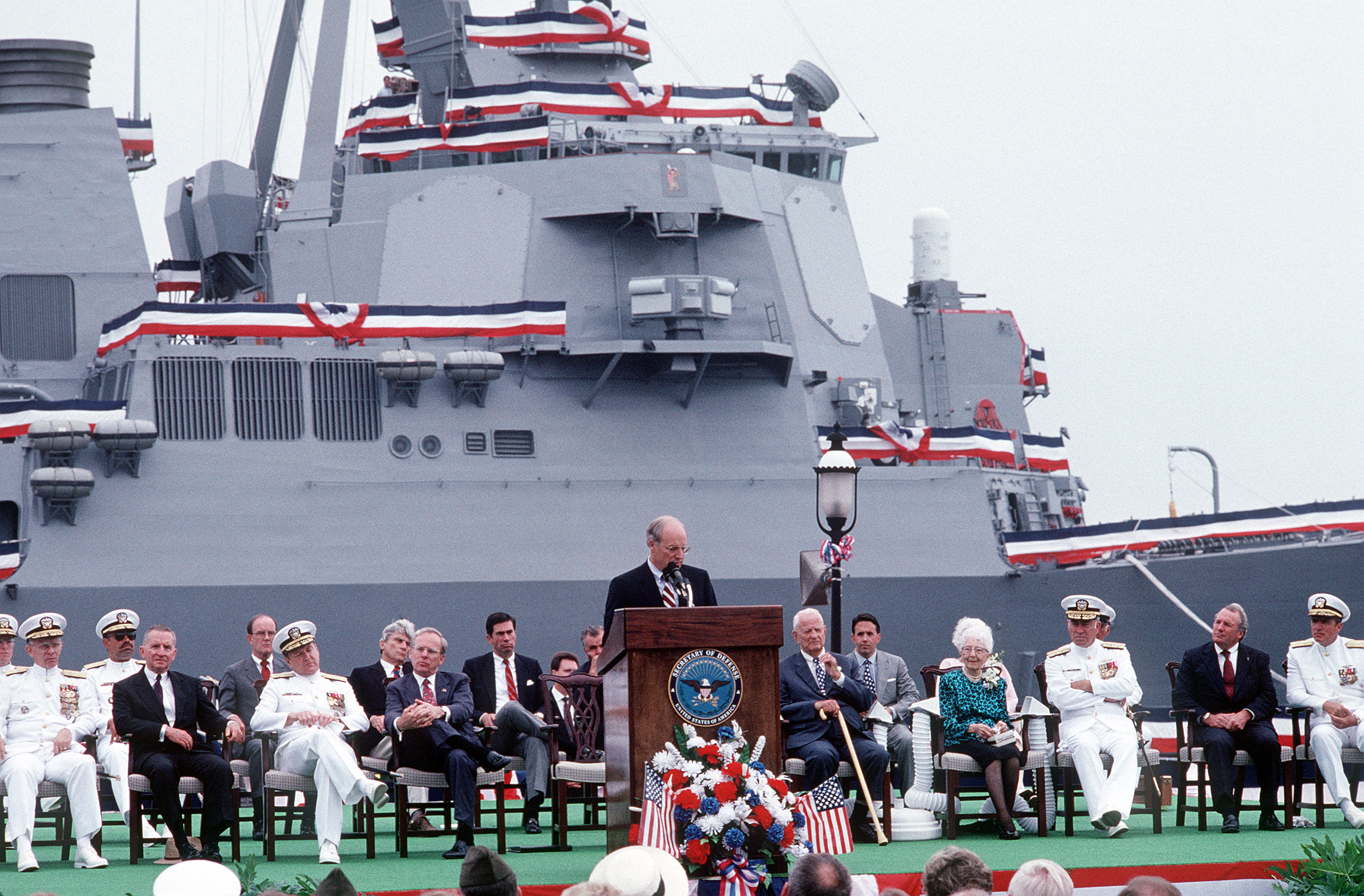
Arleigh Burke and wife sit behind Secretary of Defense Dick Cheney, who delivers the keynote address during the commissioning ceremony for USS Arleigh Burke, Secretary of the Navy Henry Garrett, Ross Perot, and U.S. Senators from Virginia John Warner and Chuck Robb also present, July 4, 1991.

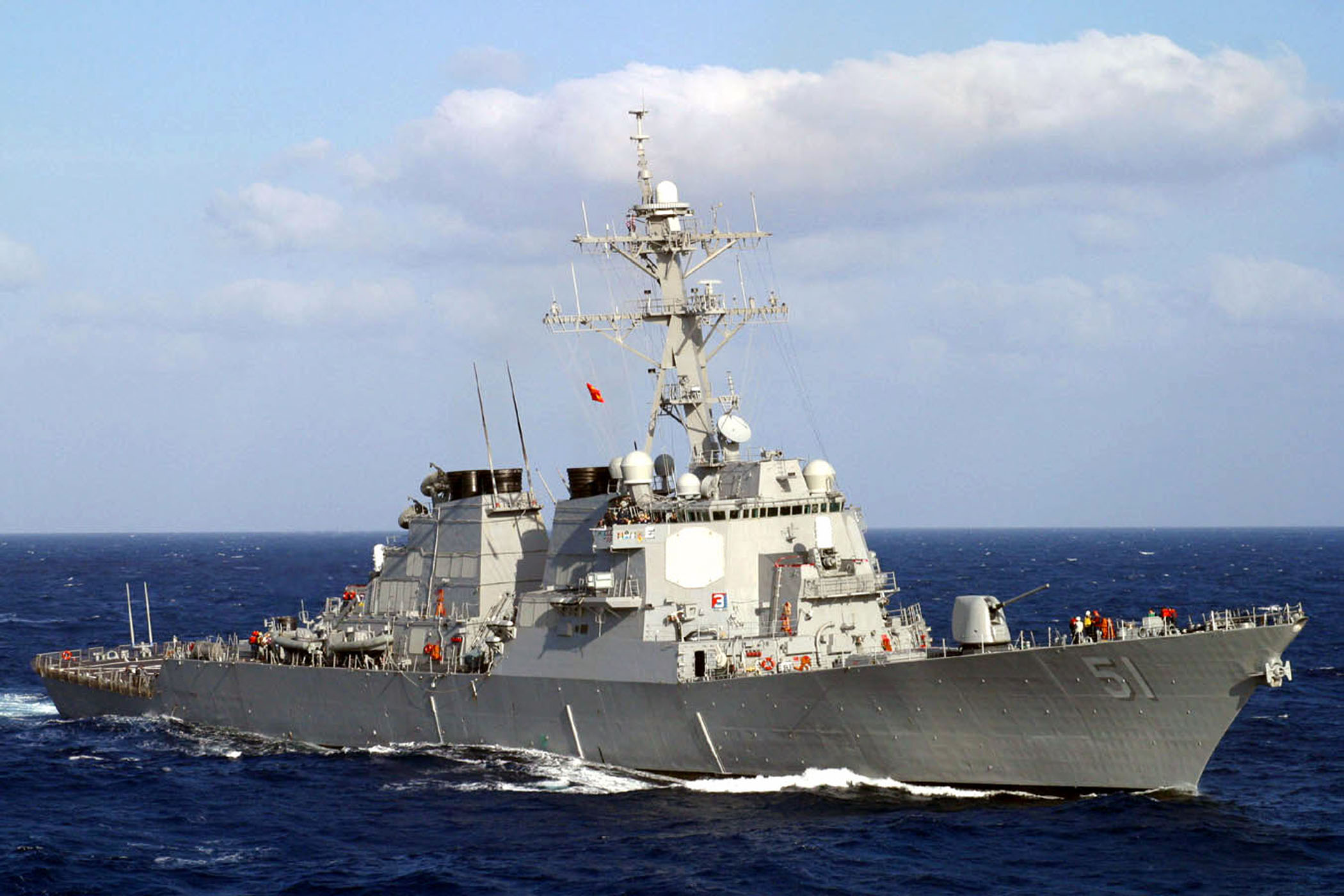
USS Arleigh Burke (DDG-51)

USS Arleigh Burke (DDG-51), the lead ship of her class of Aegis-equipped guided missile destroyers, was commissioned in his honor in 1991. In 1985, a few months after the ship was ordered, an early keel-laying ceremony was held at Bath Iron Works. Burke marked his initials on material that was later incorporated at the physical keel-laying on December 6, 1988. Burke was one of the very few individuals to be honored by a ship named after them during their lifetime.

The Assisted Living section of the Vinson Hall Retirement Community in McLean, Virginia, is named the Arleigh Burke Pavilion in his honor.

== Medals ==

Navy Cross
Navy Distinguished Service Medal w/2 award stars	Silver Star	Legion of Merit w/Combat "V" Valor device & 3 award stars
Navy and Marine Corps; Commendation Medal w/Combat "V" Valor device	Purple Heart	United States Navy; Presidential Unit Citation w/3 service stars
Navy Unit Commendation	American Defense Service Medal w/1 service star	American Campaign Medal
Asiatic-Pacific Campaign Medal w/ 11 service stars	World War II Victory Medal	Army of Occupation Medal
National Defense Service Medal w/ 1 service star	Korean Service Medal w/ 1 service star	Order of Military Merit (South Korea) (2nd Grade, Eulji Mundeok); 5 award stars
Presidential Unit Citation (Korea) w/ 1 service star	Philippines Liberation Medal w/ 2 service stars	United Nations Service Medal (Korea) w/ 1 service star

Additional awards

Presidential Medal of Freedom
Order of the Rising Sun (1st Class, Grand Cordon)	Royal Norwegian Order of St. Olav (Grand Cross)	Korean War Service Medal

Burke received numerous combat awards during his forty-two years in the Navy, including the Navy Cross, Navy Distinguished Service Medal, Legion of Merit, and the Purple Heart. None were more cherished than two awards that came early in his career. In 1928, while serving aboard USS Procyon (AG-11), he was commended for the "rescue of shipwrecked and seafaring men." In 1939 during his first command, USS Mugford (DD-389), he was commended when his destroyer won the fleet gunnery trophy with the highest score in many years. His ship also stood third in engineering competition and high in communication competition.

For his service in Destroyer Squadron 23, Burke was awarded the Navy Cross, the Navy Distinguished Service Medal, the Legion of Merit, and the Presidential Unit Citation awarded to the squadron. The citations follow in part:

Navy Cross

The President of the United States of America takes pleasure in presenting the Navy Cross to Captain Arleigh Albert Burke (NSN: 57951/1100), United States Navy, for extraordinary heroism and distinguished service in the line of his profession as Commander of Destroyer Squadron TWENTY-THREE (DesSq-23), operating in the Northern Solomon Islands area during the period from midnight 30 October to noon 2 November 1943. Proceeding through unfamiliar and poorly charted waters, Commodore Burke, under terrific fire from hostile shore batteries and aerial attacks, participated in the initial bombardment of Buka-Bonis and the first daylight assault on Shortland-Faisi-Ballale. Against a Japanese Task Force of superior fire power, he fought his squadron with superb skill in a victorious engagement which resulted in the sinking of five enemy warships and the damaging of four. Later, when sixty-seven hostile bombers launched a deadly attack against his Task Force, Commodore Burke kept up a vigorous barrage of anti-aircraft fire which assisted in shooting down seventeen Japanese planes and driving off the others. His aggressive leadership and gallant conduct under fire contributed to the protection of our beachhead at Empress Augusta Bay and to the successful establishment of our land and air forces on the Bougainville Islands. His actions at all times were in keeping with the highest traditions of the United States Naval Service.

Navy Distinguished Service Medal

For exceptionally meritorious service to the Government of the United States in a duty of great responsibility as Commanding Officer of a Destroyer Division and subsequently a Destroyer Squadron operating against enemy Japanese forces in the South Pacific Area from early February to 1 December 1943. Throughout this period, Captain Burke led his forces in many offensive operations... His indomitable fighting spirit and great personal courage contributed directly to the success of our forces in that area and were in keeping with the highest traditions of the United States Naval Service.

Legion of Merit

For exceptionally meritorious conduct...as Commander Destroyer Squadron Twenty-three, in action against enemy Japanese forces northwest of the Bismarck Archipelago, at Kavieng, New Ireland, and Duke of York Island, February 17 to 23, 1944 … (He) expertly directed his squadron in destroying two Japanese naval auxiliary vessels, one large cargo ship, a mine layer, four barges and inflicting severe damage on enemy shore installations and subsequently effected a skillful withdrawal without damage to his vessels...

As Chief of Staff, Commander Fast Carrier Task Force, Pacific (Task Force 38), Burke was awarded a Gold Star in lieu of a second Distinguished Service Medal, the Silver Star, a Gold Star in lieu of a second Legion of Merit, and a Letter of Commendation, with authorization to wear the Commendation Ribbon. The citations follow in part:

For... outstanding service... as Chief of Staff to Commander First Carrier Task Force, Pacific, during action against enemy Japanese forces in the Pacific War from 15 December 1944 to 15 May 1945... Commodore Burke was in large measure responsible for the efficient control under combat conditions of the tactical disposition, the operation, the security and the explosive offensive power of his task force in its bold and determined execution of measures designed to force the capitulation of the Japanese Empire... throughout the seizure of bases at lwo Jima and Okinawa, including two carrier strikes on Tokyo, a carrier strike on the Kure Naval Base, and engagement with the Japanese Fleet on 7 April, in which several hostile man-o-war were destroyed by our aircraft...

Silver Star

For conspicuous gallantry and intrepidity as Chief of Staff to Commander First Carrier Task Force in action against enemy Japanese forces in the Pacific War Area, May 11, 1945. When the flagship on which he was embarked was hit by two enemy suicide dive bombers, Commodore Burke proceeded to a compartment in which personnel were trapped by fire and heavy smoke, and succeeded in evacuating all hands. When the flagship to which he had removed his staff was in turn hit by a suicide plane on May 14, he again arranged for the transfer of his command to a new ship. In spite of all difficulties, he maintained tactical control of the Task Force throughout, thereby contributing materially to the success of the operations...

Gold Star in lieu of second Legion of Merit

For exceptionally meritorious conduct... as Chief of Staff to Commander, Carrier Task Force, Pacific Fleet, from March 27 to October 30., 1944... (He) planned and executed a long series of successful offensive operations in support of the reduction of the outer perimeter of Japanese defenses in New Guinea, the Carolines, the Marianas, Halmshera, and the Philippine Islands. Largely as a result of Commodore Burke's superb professional skill, tireless energy and coolness of decision throughout these operations and during repeated air attacks carried out in strength against heavily fortified strongholds in enemy-controlled waters, the Pacific Fleet has been brought within range of the Japanese Empire itself to continue our relentless drive against the enemy.

Letter of Commendation

For distinguishing himself in action with the enemy, while serving as a Chief of Staff to Commander First Carrier Task Force, Pacific on May 11, 1945. When the ship in which he was embarked was hit by two enemy aircraft … with utter disregard for his personal safety, (he) efficiently organized the evacuation of endangered personnel. His courage together with his prompt and efficient action was responsible for saving these men...

From September 1950 until May 1951, Burke served as Deputy Chief of Staff to Commander U.S. Naval Forces, Far East, and, for "exceptionally meritorious conduct (in that capacity) from September 3, 1950, to January 1, 1951" he was awarded a Gold Star in lieu of a third Legion of Merit. The citation further states:

Bringing a sound knowledge of Naval Administration and professional skill to his assigned task, Rear Admiral Burke reorganized the rapidly expanded staff to meet its ever increasing responsibilities and, through his unusually fine conception of the essentials of modern warfare, materially improved the mutual functioning of the operation, plans and intelligence sections of the staff... (and) contributed immeasurably to the success of Naval operations in the Korean theater...

While serving as Commander Cruiser Division Five from May to September 1951, and also as a Member of the Military Armistice Commission in Korea, Burke was awarded an oak leaf cluster in lieu of a fourth Legion of Merit by the Army (Headquarters U.S. Army Forces, Far East) by General Order #5, as follows:

For exceptionally meritorious conduct in the performance of outstanding services as a delegate with the United Nations Command (Advance) in Korea, from July 9 to December 5, 1951. Admiral Burke's keen discernment and decisive judgment were of inestimable value in countering enemy intransigence, misrepresentation and evasion with reasoned negotiation demonstrable truth and conciliatory measures. As advisor to the Chief Delegate on all phases of the Armistice Conferences, he proffered timely recommendations for solutions of the varied intricate problems encountered. Through skillful assessment of enemy capabilities, dispositions, and vulnerable abilities and brilliant guidance of supporting Staff officers (he) significantly furthered progression toward success of the United Nations' first armed bid for world peace.

Burke was presented a Gold Star in lieu of a third Distinguished Service Medal by President John F. Kennedy at the White House on July 26, 1961. On January 10, 1977, Burke was presented with the Presidential Medal of Freedom by President Gerald Ford.

=== Presidential Unit Citations ===
Burke was also entitled to wear the Presidential Unit Citations presented to Destroyer Squadron 23, USS Bunker Hill (CV-17), USS Lexington (CV-16), and to USS Enterprise (CV-6). Those vessels were, at various times during his period of service, flagships of the Fast Carrier Task Forces in the Pacific. The citation for the citation to Destroyer Squadron 23 reads:

For extraordinary heroism in action against enemy Japanese forces during the Solomon Islands Campaign, from 1 November 1943 to February 23, 1944 … Destroyer Squadron Twenty-three operated in daring defiance of repeated attacks by hostile air groups, closing the enemy's strongly fortified shores to carry out sustained bombardments against Japanese coastal defenses and render effective cover and fire support for the major invasion operations in this area … The brilliant and heroic record achieved by Destroyer Squadron Twenty-three is a distinctive tribute to the valiant fighting spirit of the individual units in this indomitable combat group of each skilled and courageous ship's company...

=== Other awards ===
In addition to the above, Burke earned the American Defense Service Medal with "Fleet" clasp, the Asiatic-Pacific Campaign Medal with two silver stars and two bronze stars (twelve engagements); the American Campaign Medal; World War II Victory Medal; Navy Occupation Service Medal, the National Defense Service Medal with bronze star (Admiral Burke became retroactively eligible for a second award after his retirement); Korean Service Medal with bronze battle star; the Philippine Liberation Medal with bronze service star; and the United Nations Korea Medal. He was awarded the Ui Chi Medal and the Presidential Unit Citation from the Republic of Korea as well as the Order of the Rising Sun, First Class by the Government of Japan. In March 1959, he was elected an Honorary Member of the Royal Swedish Society of Naval Sciences. In 1960, he received the Grand Cross of the Royal Norwegian Order of St. Olav from the Norwegian King. In 1999, Admiral Burke became posthumously eligible for the Korean War Service Medal awarded by the Republic of Korea.

== Legacy ==
In 1962, Burke co-founded the Center for Strategic and International Studies (CSIS) in Washington, D.C., with David Abshire. CSIS hosts the Arleigh A. Burke Chair in Strategy, which "provides political and military analysis of key strategic challenges facing the United States and the world." It is held as of 2013 by Anthony Cordesman.

Burke was elected as an honorary member of the New York State Society of Cincinnati in 1964.

Burke was a member of a hideaway camp, within the well known Bohemian Grove, an exclusive all-men's fraternity getaway held yearly in the redwood forests of northern California by the Bohemian Club. Many notable figures have been a part of the Bohemian Club. Burke joined the hideaway camp in 1966 and left in 1972.

In 1991, Burke was awarded the Lone Sailor Award by the U.S. Navy Memorial Foundation for his distinguished career during World War II and the Korean War.

The USS Arleigh Burke (DDG-51), a guided-missile destroyer of the United States Navy and lead ship of her class, was named in his honor. The class is one of the most advanced in service and is one of only two destroyer classes currently in active US Navy service.

An elementary school was named in his honor in Boulder, Colorado; it was closed in 1982. Thunderbird Park, also in Boulder, was renamed Admiral Arleigh A. Burke Memorial Park in 1997. In October 2001, a dedication of the memorial was held, featuring a 12-foot, 26,000-pound anchor from a World War II destroyer, a memorial wall containing a bronze relief sculpture of the admiral and a plaque with his biography.

The Navy annually awards the Arleigh Burke Fleet Trophy to "the ship or aircraft squadron from each coast selected for having achieved the greatest improvement in battle efficiency during the calendar year, based upon the Battle Efficiency Competition." Winning the Battle "E" is not a prerequisite.

The United States Postal Service issued a commemorative stamp pane on February 4, 2010, honoring distinguished sailors. In addition to Burke, the other persons on the stamp pane were Admiral William S. Sims, Lieutenant Commander John McCloy, and Officer's Cook Third Class Doris Miller.

== Notes ==
Military offices
Preceded by Robert B. Carney	United States Chief of Naval Operations; 1955–1961	Succeeded by George Whelan Anderson, Jr.
