= USS Mugford (DD-105) =

Wickes-class destroyer

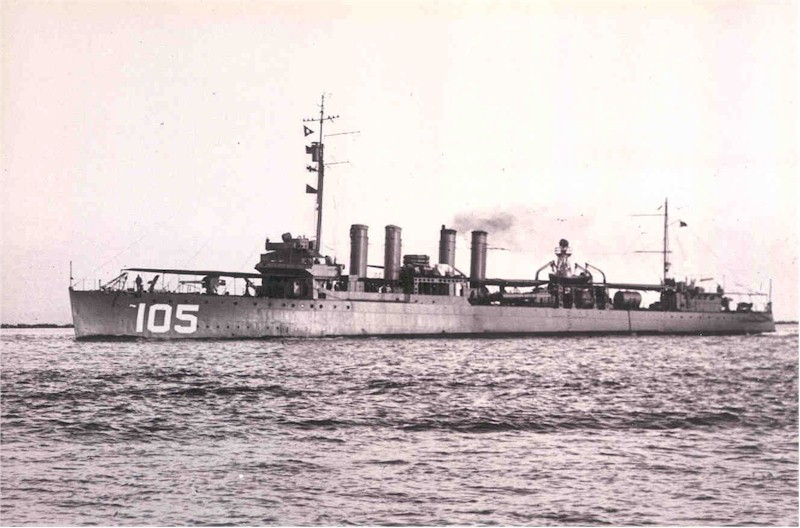
- USS Mugford (DD-105)

History

United States
- Namesake: James Mugford
- Builder: Union Iron Works, San Francisco, California
- Laid down: 20 December 1917
- Launched: 14 April 1918
- Commissioned: 25 November 1918
- Decommissioned: 7 June 1922
- Stricken: 19 May 1936
- Fate: Sold for scrap, 1936

General characteristics
- Class & type: Wickes-class destroyer
- Displacement: 1,202–1,208 long tons (1,221–1,227 t) (standard); 1,295–1,322 long tons (1,316–1,343 t) (deep load)
- Length: 314 ft 4 in (95.8 m)
- Beam: 30 ft 11 in (9.42 m)
- Draught: 9 ft 10 in (3.0 m)
- Installed power: 27,000 shp (20,000 kW); 4 water-tube boilers
- Propulsion: 2 shafts, 2 steam turbines
- Speed: 35 knots (65 km/h; 40 mph) (design)
- Range: 2,500 nautical miles (4,600 km; 2,900 mi) at 20 knots (37 km/h; 23 mph) (design)
- Complement: 6 officers, 108 enlisted men
- Armament: 4 × single 4-inch (102 mm) guns; 2 × single 1-pounder AA guns; 4 × triple 21 inch (533 mm) torpedo tubes; 2 × depth charge rails

USS Mugford (DD-105) was a Wickes-class destroyer built for the United States Navy during World War I.

== Description ==
The Wickes class was an improved and faster version of the preceding Caldwell-class. Two different designs were prepared to the same specification, which mainly differed in the turbines and boilers used. The ships built to the Bethlehem Steel design, built in the Fore River and Union Iron Works shipyards, mostly used Yarrow boilers that deteriorated badly during service and were mostly scrapped during the 1930s. The ships displaced 1,202–1,208 long tons (1,221–1,227 t) at standard load and 1,295–1,322 long tons (1,316–1,343 t) at deep load. They had an overall length of 314 feet 4 inches (95.8 m), a beam of 30 feet 11 inches (9.4 m) and a draught of 9 feet 10 inches (3.0 m). They had a crew of 6 officers and 108 enlisted men.

Performance differed radically between the ships of the class, often due to poor workmanship. The Wickes class was powered by two steam turbines, each driving one propeller shaft, using steam provided by four water-tube boilers. The turbines were designed to produce a total of 27,000 shaft horsepower (20,000 kW) intended to reach a speed of 35 knots (65 km/h; 40 mph). The ships carried 225 long tons (229 t) of fuel oil , which was intended to give them a range of 2,500 nautical miles (4,600 km; 2,900 mi) at 20 knots (37 km/h; 23 mph).

The ships were armed with four 4-inch (102 mm) guns in single mounts and were fitted with two 1-pounder guns for anti-aircraft defense. Their primary weapon, though, was their torpedo battery of a dozen 21 inch (533 mm) torpedo tubes in four triple mounts. In many ships, a shortage of 1-pounders caused them to be replaced by 3-inch (76 mm) anti-aircraft (AA) guns. They also carried a pair of depth charge rails. A "Y-gun" depth charge thrower was added to many ships.

== Construction and career ==
Mugford, named for James Mugford, was laid down 20 December 1917 by Union Iron Works Company, San Francisco, California; launched 14 April 1918; sponsored by Mrs. George H. Fort; and commissioned 25 November 1918.

Mugford joined the fleet for winter exercises off Guantanamo Bay, Cuba, in January 1919, then sailed north for operations along the coast between New York and Massachusetts until 21 November, when she left Newport for San Diego, arriving 22 December. Here she became tender to a seaplane division, and during the pioneering days of naval aviation cruised with her charges on exercises along the California coast, visiting the Panama Canal Zone in December 1920 and January 1921.

Mugford was decommissioned at San Diego on 7 June 1922 and was sold for scrap to Schiavone-Bonomo Corporation, New York City, in 1936.
