= USS Huntington (CL-107) =

Light cruiser of the United States Navy

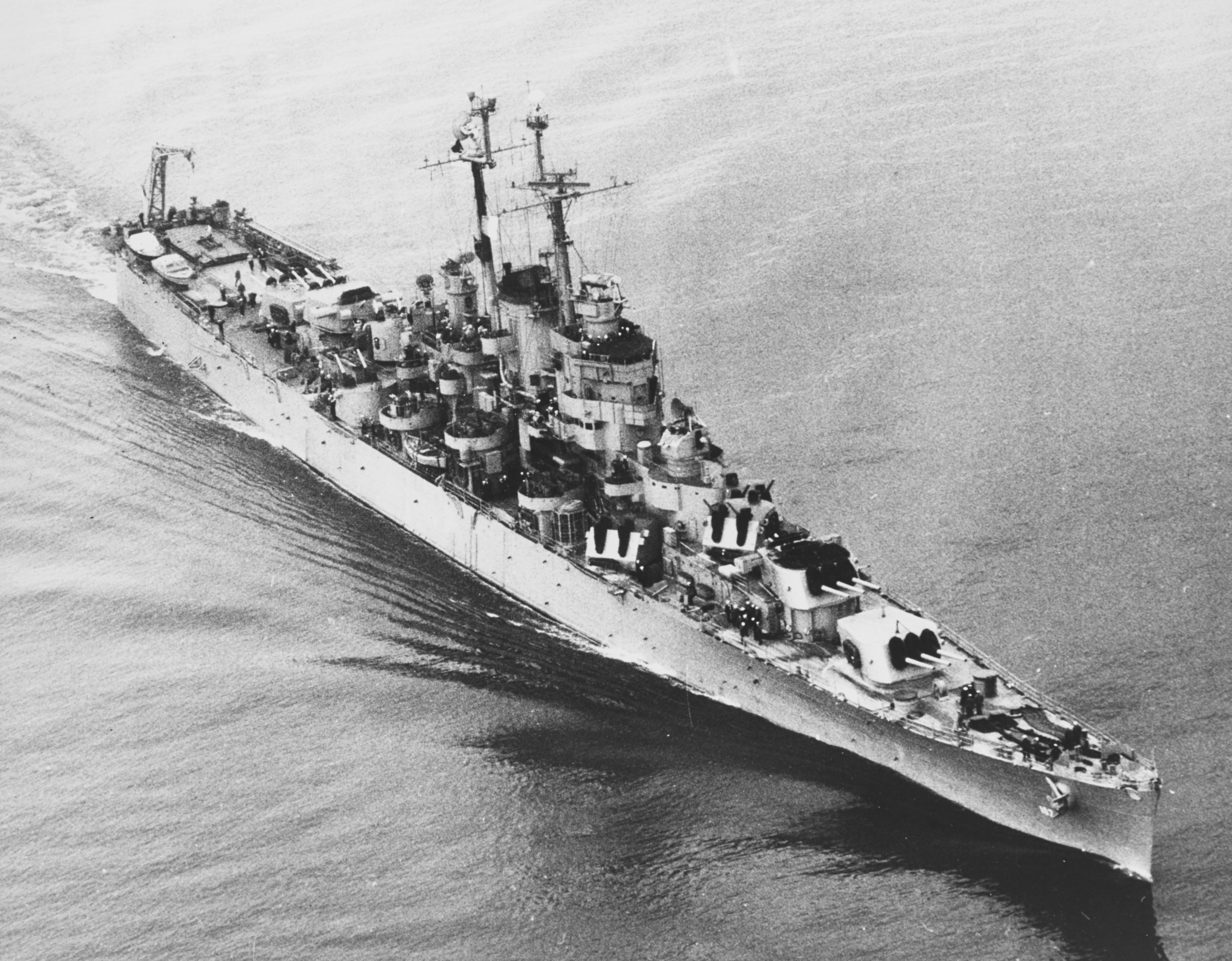
- USS Huntington (CL-107), underway, 12 April 1948.

History

United States
- Name: Huntington
- Namesake: City of Huntington, West Virginia
- Builder: New York Shipbuilding Corporation, Camden, New Jersey
- Laid down: 4 October 1943
- Launched: 8 April 1945
- Sponsored by: Mrs. M. L. Jarrett, Jr.
- Commissioned: 23 February 1946
- Decommissioned: 15 June 1949
- Stricken: 1 September 1961
- Identification: Hull symbol:CL-107; Code letters:NHCJ
- Fate: Sold for scrap on 16 May 1962

General characteristics
- Class & type: Fargo-class light cruiser
- Displacement: 11,744 long tons (11,932 t) (standard); 14,131 long tons (14,358 t) (max)
- Length: 610 ft 1 in (185.95 m) oa; 608 ft (185 m)pp
- Beam: 66 ft 4 in (20.22 m)
- Draft: 25 ft 6 in (7.77 m) (mean); 25 ft (7.6 m) (max)
- Installed power: 4 × 634 psi Steam boilers; 100,000 shp (75,000 kW)
- Propulsion: 4 × geared turbines; 4 × screws
- Speed: 32.5 kn (37.4 mph; 60.2 km/h)
- Range: 11,000 nmi (20,000 km) at 15 kn (17 mph; 28 km/h)
- Complement: 1,255 officers and enlisted
- Armament: 4 × triple 6 in (150 mm)/47 caliber Mark 16 guns; 6 × dual 5 in (130 mm)/38 caliber anti-aircraft guns; 4 × quad 40 mm (1.6 in) Bofors anti-aircraft guns; 6 × dual 40 mm (1.6 in) Bofors anti-aircraft guns; 10 × single 20 mm (0.79 in) Oerlikon anti-aircraft cannons
- Armor: Belt: 3 1/2–5 in (89–127 mm); Deck: 2 in (51 mm); Barbettes: 6 in (150 mm); Turrets: 1 1/2–6 in (38–152 mm); Conning Tower: 2 1/4–5 in (57–127 mm)
- Aircraft carried: 4 × floatplanes
- Aviation facilities: 2 × stern catapults

USS Huntington (CL-107), a Fargo-class light cruiser, was the second ship of the United States Navy named after the city of Huntington, West Virginia. She was built during World War II but not completed until after the end of the war and in use for only a few years.

Huntington was launched by the New York Shipbuilding Corporation, Camden, New Jersey, on 8 April 1945, sponsored by Mrs. M. L. Jarrett, Jr., and commissioned 23 February 1946.

== Service history ==
After shakedown training off Guantánamo Bay, Cuba, Huntington sailed from Philadelphia on 23 July 1946 for duty with the 6th Fleet in the Mediterranean. During the cruise she visited many ports, including Naples, Malta, Villefranche, and Alexandria, helping to stabilize the volatile post-war situation in Europe. Departing Gibraltar on 8 February 1947, she took part in exercises off Guantánamo Bay, stopped at Norfolk and Newport, Rhode Island, and departed the latter port 20 May 1947 for another tour of duty in the Mediterranean.

Returning from her cruise on 13 September 1947, Huntington departed Philadelphia on 24 October with Naval Reserve personnel for exercises off Bermuda and Newfoundland until 14 November 1947. The ship then entered Philadelphia Naval Shipyard and underwent an extensive overhaul until 12 April 1948. During that period Captain Arleigh Burke, future CNO, assumed command in December 1947 until December 1948. Returning to Norfolk on 27 April from her refresher training cruise in the Caribbean, Huntington sailed to Newport and departed for another tour of duty in the Mediterranean on 1 June 1948.

Huntington visited a variety of ports during June to August 1948, and after transiting the Suez Canal on 22 September. The ship was assigned to Task Group 160.3 for a deployment to the Mediterranean Sea, East Africa and South America from 1 June to 8 December 1948. TG 160.3 consisted of the light cruisers USS Fargo (CL-106), USS Huntington (CL-107), USS Juneau (CLAA-119) and the destroyer USS Douglas H. Fox (DD-779). The good will tour group arrived Buenos Aires, Argentina, on 6 November. There the ship was honored by an official visit from President Juan Perón, and continuing to Uruguay received a similar visit from President Luis Berres on 10 November. Huntington called at Rio de Janeiro and Trinidad before returning from this valuable good will cruise on 8 December 1948.

The cruiser made one short cruise from Philadelphia to the Caribbean, returned to Newport on 22 January, and decommissioned on 15 June 1949. She was finally struck from the Navy List on 1 September 1961 after being in reserve, and was sold to Boston Metals, Baltimore, Maryland, on 16 May 1962. Her name plate is on display at the Freedom Park.
