= Fargo-class cruiser =

Ship class

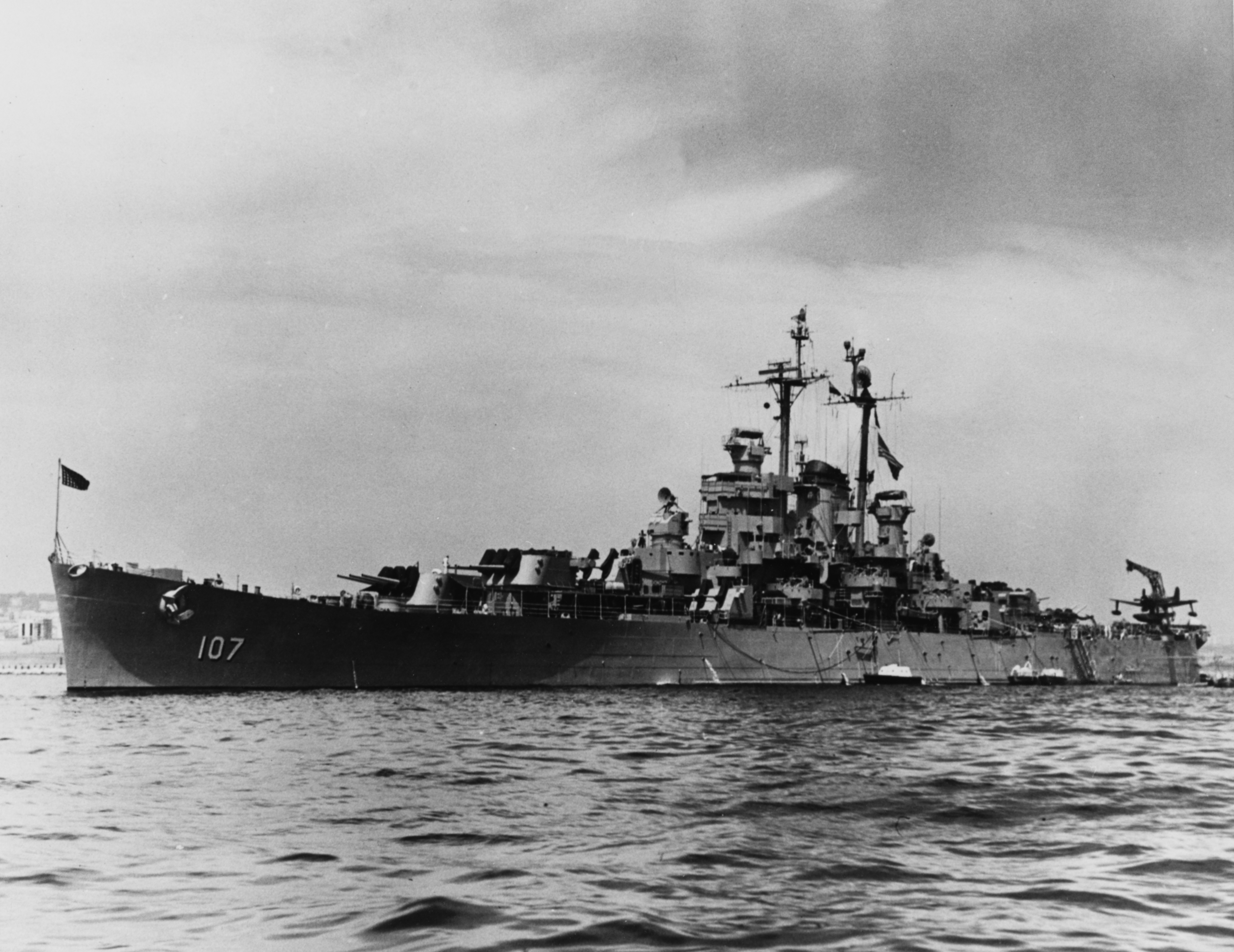
- USS Huntington in August 1948

Class overview
- Name: Fargo-class
- Builders: New York Shipbuilding, NJ
- Operators: United States Navy
- Preceded by: Cleveland class
- Succeeded by: Worcester class
- Built: 1943–1946
- In commission: 1945–1950
- Planned: 13
- Completed: 2
- Canceled: 11
- Retired: 2
- Scrapped: 2

General characteristics
- Type: Light cruiser
- Displacement: 11,744 long tons (11,932 t) (standard); 14,464 long tons (14,696 t) (full)
- Length: 608 ft .25 in (185.3 m)
- Beam: 66 ft 4 in (20.2 m)
- Draft: 22 ft (6.7 m)
- Installed power: 4 × Babcock & Wilcox, 634 psi boilers; 100,000 shp (75,000 kW)
- Propulsion: 4 × General Electric geared steam turbines; 4 × screws
- Speed: 32.5 knots (60.2 km/h; 37.4 mph)
- Range: 10,800 nmi (20,000 km; 12,400 mi) at 15 knots (28 km/h; 17 mph)
- Boats & landing craft carried: 2 × lifeboats
- Complement: 1,100 officers and enlisted
- Sensors & processing systems: SK-2 air-search radar; SR-3 air-search radar; SG-6 surface-search radar; SP fighter-direction radar
- Armament: 4 × triple 6"/47 caliber Mark 16 guns; 6 × dual 5"/38 caliber guns; 4 × quad Bofors 40 mm guns; 6 × dual Bofors 40 mm guns; 20 × Oerlikon 20 mm cannons
- Armor: Belt: 1.5–5 in (38–127 mm); Deck: 2–3 in (51–76 mm); Bulkheads: 5 in (127 mm); Turrets: 3–5 in (76–127 mm); Barbettes: 6 in (152 mm); Conning tower: 2.25–5 in (57–127 mm)
- Aircraft carried: 4 × floatplanes
- Aviation facilities: 2 × stern catapults

The Fargo-class cruisers were a modified version of the Cleveland-class cruiser design; the main difference was a more compact pyramidal superstructure with single trunked funnel, intended to improve the arcs of fire of the anti-aircraft (AA) guns. The same type of modification differentiated the Baltimore and Oregon City classes of heavy cruisers, and to a lesser degree the Atlanta and Juneau classes of light cruisers. Changes were made in order to reduce the instability of the Cleveland-class light cruisers, especially their tendency to roll dangerously. The main battery turrets sat about a foot lower and the wing gunhouses (the 5-inch, twin gun mounts on the sides of the ship) were lowered to the main deck. The medium (40 mm) anti-aircraft mounts were also lowered.

In all, 13 ships of the class were planned but only Fargo and Huntington were ever completed, the rest being cancelled at varying states of completion with the de-escalation and eventual end of World War II.

Fargo, the lead ship of the class, was launched on 25 February 1945, but was not commissioned until 9 December 1945, four months after the war ended. Huntington was commissioned early in 1946. The two ships were decommissioned in 1949–1950, and never reactivated.

== Ships in class ==
Construction data
Ship name	Hull no.	Builder	Laid down	Launched	Commissioned	Decommissioned	Fate
Fargo	CL-106	New York Shipbuilding Corporation, Camden, New Jersey	23 August 1943	25 February 1945	9 December 1945	14 February 1950	Struck 1 March 1970; Sold for scrap, 18 August 1971
Huntington	CL-107	New York Shipbuilding Corporation, Camden, New Jersey	4 October 1943	8 April 1945	23 February 1946	15 June 1949	Struck 1 September 1961; Sold for scrap, on 16 May 1962
Newark	CL-108	New York Shipbuilding Corporation, Camden, New Jersey	17 January 1944	14 December 1945	—N/a	—N/a	Construction canceled 12 August 1945 when 67.8% completed, launched on 14 December 1945, for use in underwater explosion tests, sold on 2 April 1949 for scrapping
New Haven	CL-109	New York Shipbuilding Corporation, Camden, New Jersey	28 February 1944	—N/a	—N/a	—N/a	Construction cancelled 12 August 1945 and scrapped on slip
Buffalo	CL-110	New York Shipbuilding Corporation, Camden, New Jersey	2 April 1944	—N/a	—N/a	—N/a	Construction cancelled 12 August 1945 and scrapped on slip
Wilmington	CL-111	William Cramp & Sons Shipbuilding Company, Philadelphia, Pennsylvania	5 March 1945	—N/a	—N/a	—N/a	Construction cancelled 12 August 1945 and scrapped on slip
Vallejo	CL-112	New York Shipbuilding Corporation, Camden, New Jersey	—N/a	—N/a	—N/a	—N/a	Construction cancelled 5 October 1944
Helena	CL-113	New York Shipbuilding Corporation, Camden, New Jersey	—N/a	—N/a	—N/a	—N/a	Construction cancelled 5 October 1944
Roanoke	CL-114	New York Shipbuilding Corporation, Camden, New Jersey	—N/a	—N/a	—N/a	—N/a	Construction cancelled 5 October 1944
—N/a	CL-115	New York Shipbuilding Corporation, Camden, New Jersey	—N/a	—N/a	—N/a	—N/a	Construction cancelled 5 October 1944
Tallahassee	CL-116	Newport News Shipbuilding and Dry Dock Company, Newport News, Virginia	31 January 1944	—N/a	—N/a	—N/a	Construction cancelled 12 August 1945 and scrapped on slip
Cheyenne	CL-117	Newport News Shipbuilding and Dry Dock Company, Newport News, Virginia	29 May 1944	—N/a	—N/a	—N/a	Construction cancelled 12 August 1945 and scrapped on slip
Chattanooga (ex-Norfolk)	CL-118	Newport News Shipbuilding and Dry Dock Company, Newport News, Virginia	9 October 1944	—N/a	—N/a	—N/a	Construction cancelled 12 August 1945 and scrapped on slip

== See also ==
- List of cruisers of the United States Navy

== Bibliography ==
- Terzibashitsch, Stefan (1988). Cruisers of the US Navy 1922-1962. Annapolis, Maryland: Naval Institute Press. ISBN 0-87021-974-X.
