= USS Mugford (DD-389) =

Bagley-class destroyer

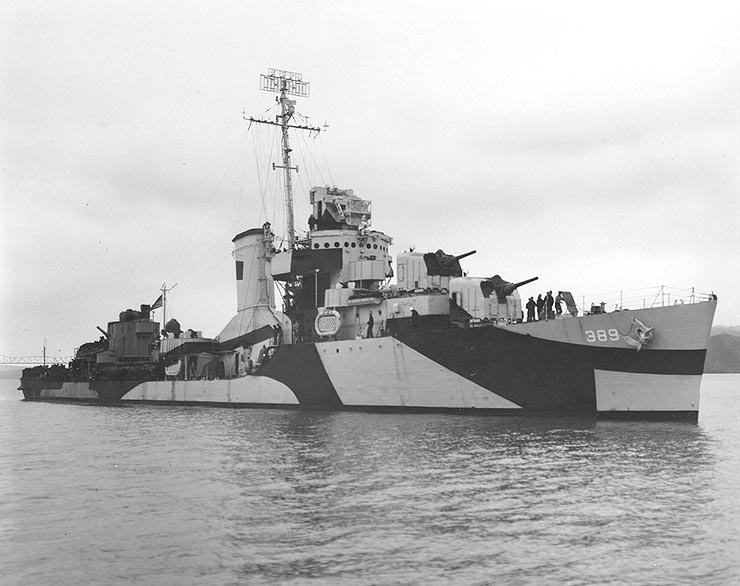
- USS Mugford (DD-389) in April 1944 at Mare Island Naval Shipyard, California, painted in Measure 32 camouflage

History

United States
- Namesake: James Mugford
- Builder: Boston Navy Yard
- Laid down: 28 October 1935
- Launched: 31 October 1936
- Commissioned: 16 August 1937
- Decommissioned: 29 August 1946
- Stricken: 5 April 1948
- Honours and awards: 7 battle stars (World War II)
- Fate: Scuttled on 22 March 1948

General characteristics
- Class & type: Bagley class destroyer
- Displacement: 2,325 tons (full), 1,500 tons (light)
- Length: 341 ft 8 in (104.14 m)
- Beam: 35 ft 6 in (10.82 m)
- Draught: 12 ft 10 in (3.91 m) at full displacement, 10 ft 4 in (3.15 m)) at light displacement
- Propulsion: 49,000 shp, driving 2 propellers
- Speed: 38.5 knots (71.3 km/h)
- Range: 6500 nautical miles (12,000 km) at 12 knots (22.2 km/h)
- Complement: 200
- Armament: 4 × 5 in./38 guns (12 cm), 4 × .50 cal (12.7 mm) guns, 16 × 21 inch (533 mm) torpedo tubes

USS Mugford (DD-389), a Bagley-class destroyer, was the 2nd ship of the United States Navy to be named for James Mugford, who commanded the schooner Franklin in the Continental Navy, serving through 1775.

== Construction ==
The second Mugford was laid down 28 October 1935 by Boston Navy Yard; launched 31 October 1936; sponsored by Miss Madeline Orne; and commissioned 16 August 1937.

== Operational history ==
Joining the Pacific Fleet in late 1937, Mugford conducted local operations along the West Coast and around the Hawaiian Islands, taking time out for periodic overhauls and upkeep. From 5 June 1939 to 30 July 1940 she was the first command of then Lieutenant Commander Arleigh Burke, and under his command was awarded a Battle "E" for gunnery excellence. 7 December 1941 found her at Pearl Harbor as flagship of Destroyer Division Eight of Destroyer Squadron Four. When the attack began, Mugford was on standby status, berthed at B6 in the Navy Yard for repairs, and while raising steam to get underway, downed three planes in 10 minutes with her antiaircraft guns. Within an hour after the attack began, the "little ship" was steaming out of Pearl Harbor firing as she went. Her next major duty was to screen the Wake Island relief force and after completion of this duty served as an escort for convoys traveling between the United States and Australia. She served in this capacity until mid‑1942.

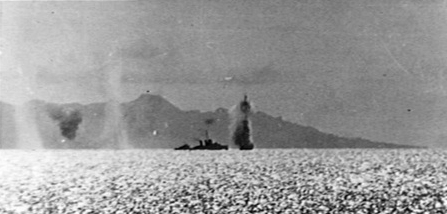
Mugford under air attack at Guadalcanal on 7 August 1942.

On 7 August, Mugford was on patrol off Lunga Point, Guadalcanal, when a large Japanese airstrike came in; three near misses and one bomb hit couldn't prevent Mugford from downing two of her attackers, but she suffered eight killed, 17 wounded, and 10 missing. Next day she shot down another enemy aircraft in a raid in which she suffered no damage, and rescued two enemy aviators from the water. On the 9th, she sped toward the action of the first Battle of Savo Island, arriving in time to pull 400 survivors of Vincennes (CA-44) and Astoria (CA-34) from the water.

After battle damage repairs at Sydney, from 16 September through December, she operated on patrol in the Coral Sea and along Australia's northern coast. Brisbane was her base for continued patrol, as well as escort missions to Milne Bay, New Guinea, which became her base later in the summer as New Guinea operations took on a faster pace. She joined in the assault on Woodlark Island in July, conducted shore bombardment and patrols in that general area in August, and in September escorted LSTs to the invasion of Lae on the 4th, after which she patrolled offshore while under enemy air attack. Later that month she conducted preinvasion bombardment north of Finschafen, off which she served until late in October. On 20 October, she and four companion destroyers were attacked by 60 enemy planes; Mugford suffered no damage.

On 15 May 1943, the Mugford rescued the survivors of the Australian hospital ship AHS Centaur off Point Lookout, Queensland, after Centaur had been sunk by a Japanese submarine the previous day.

On 14 and 15 December, she participated in the largest operation yet in the New Guinea campaign, the landings on Arawe, New Britain. Next was the assault on Buna and Cape Gloucester, where on Christmas Day she came under enemy air attack, taking three near misses in a first attack, and shooting down an attacker in a second assault later the same day. One man was killed, six wounded, and the ship riddled with shrapnel with some small holes below the waterline.

After repairs at Milne Bay, Mugford returned to patrol, bombardment, and escort missions for the New Guinea operation, sailing off Saidor. On 10 January 1944 she sailed for Sydney, then returned to New Guinea and escort and patrol duty in Huon Gulf. After escorting three merchantmen from Tulagi to the Union Islands, Mugford arrived at Pearl Harbor 24 February to escort Maryland (BB-46) to Puget Sound, before continuing on to Mare Island for overhaul, arriving 5 March.

Mugford returned to Pearl Harbor 10 May for training in preparation for the Marianas operation, for which she staged at Majuro. Screening the fast carriers, she observed the first strike the morning of 11 June, then screened battleships bombarding Saipan and Tinian, firing night harassing missions herself and screening night retirements. She rejoined the carrier screen as word came of the approach of an enemy carrier force, and thus played a role in the epic Battle of the Philippine Sea, when Japanese naval aviation was all but annihilated in a decisive victory. She continued patrol and escort missions in the Marianas and Marshalls as preparations were made to invade Guam, during which action Mugford served as radar picket between Guam and Rota. On 28 August, she sortied with TF 38 for surface bombardment and airstrikes on enemy shipping and installations in the Bonins, Yap, and Palau, covering the Palau invasion in September. Early in October, TF 38 struck at Okinawa, and on the return voyage hit at Formosa and Luzon. The enemy mustered as strong an air attack as it could on 12 and 13 October, and Mugford shared in downing many of the attackers while protecting the vulnerable carriers.

With the Leyte invasion now underway, TG 38.4, with Mugford, sped to meet the threat posed by major Japanese fleet movements, and on 24 October, planes from the force hit the Japanese Center Force in the Mindanao Sea, then headed north on receiving reports of a Japanese carrier force off northern Luzon. The next day strikes were flown against the Japanese, opening the Battle off Cape Engaño phase of the American victory in the Battle of Leyte Gulf. Further action came 30 October, when a Japanese airstrike damaged Enterprise (CV-6), Belleau Wood (CVL-24), and Franklin (CV-13). Mugford and other destroyers guarded the damaged ships to safety at Ulithi, repaired their own damage, and returned to patrol duty in Leyte Gulf.

On 5 December, Mugford spotted enemy aircraft attacking amphibious craft passing through her patrol area in Surigao Strait. She sped to protect them, and late in the action was crashed by a “Val” dive bomber. She was badly damaged, and lost eight men killed, 14 wounded. Making temporary repairs, Mugford pulled into San Pedro under her own steam. She was ordered to the United States for permanent repairs at Mare Island 5 January 1945 to 4 March 1945.

Returning to the western Pacific in mid‑March, Mugford served as radar picket and on antisubmarine patrol between Ulithi and Saipan until the close of the war. She served in TG 55.7 repatriating Allied prisoners of war from Japan to Okinawa early in September, then screened carriers providing air support for the occupation of the Nagasaki‑Sasebo area. She continued on occupation duty until returning to San Diego 19 November. Here she was stripped and prepared for participation in the Bikini atomic tests (see Operation Crossroads), during which she decommissioned 29 August 1946. Retained for experiments in decontamination, she was finally sunk off Kwajalein 22 March 1948.

== Honors and awards ==
- Asiatic-Pacific Campaign Medal with seven battle stars
- World War II Victory Medal
- Navy Occupation Medal with ASIA Clasp
