= James Mugford =

Continental Navy officer (1749–1776)

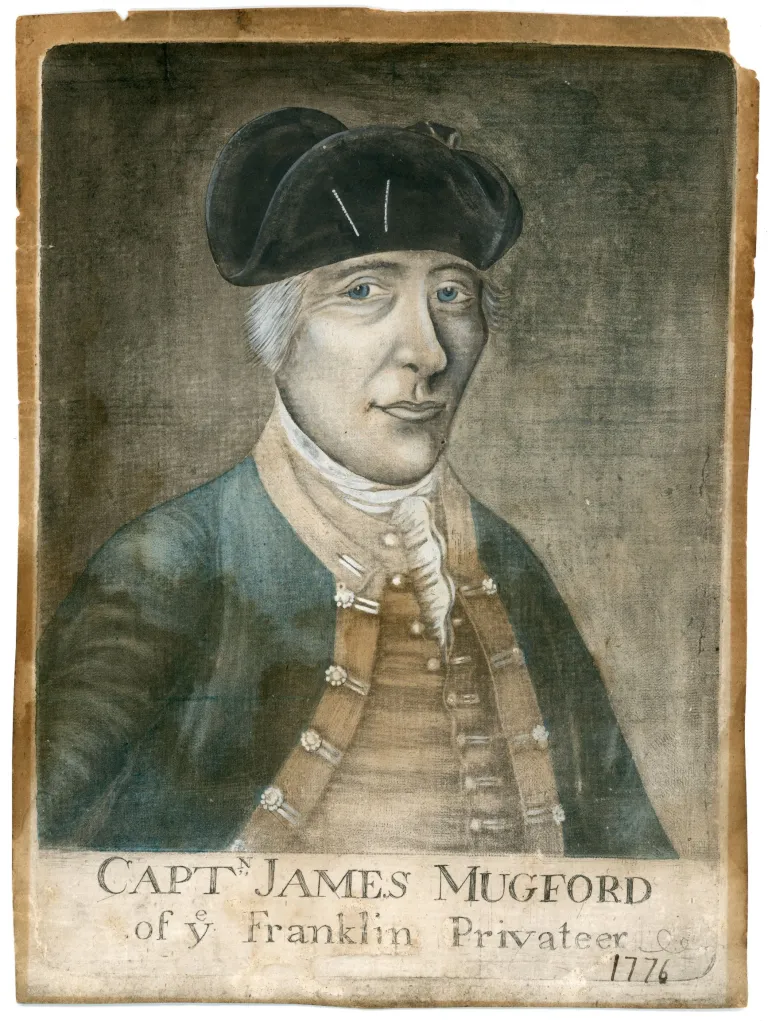
c. 1780 portrait of Mugford attributed to Samuel Blyth

Captain James Mugford (May 19, 1749 – May 19, 1776) was a Continental Navy officer who was killed in action during the American Revolutionary War.

== Life ==
James Mugford was born on May 19, 1749 in the Thirteen Colonies. Following the outbreak of the American Revolutionary War in 1775, Mugford was commissioned into the newly raised Continental Navy at the rank of captain. He was placed in command of the 6-gun schooner USS Franklin, which was part of John Manley's squadron off Boston. Franklin captured the British supply ship Hope in May 1776; Mugford proceeded to take his prize into Boston despite the presence of a British fleet lying in the outer harbor. Once he had delivered Hope into Boston, Mugford used Lady Washington to ferry him back to Franklin on May 19.

Once he had arrived back on his ship, Franklin and Lady Washington were attacked by 13 armed boats from the nearby British fleet. The boarders attempted to confuse the Americans by claiming to by friendly Bostonians; Mugford warned the boats to keep their distance and ordered his crew to open fire when they refused to obey. The British attackers split into two groups, with eight boats attacking Franklin and five attacking Lady Washington. During the fierce fighting, Mugford was fatally wounded by a British musket ball, after which he said to his lieutenant: "I am a dead man, do not give up the vessel; you will be able to beat them. If not, cut the cable and run ashore." The remaining Americans, having sunk two of their boats, beat off the attackers and forced them to withdraw. Mugford, the only American killed in the fighting, was taken ashore and buried in Marblehead, Massachusetts.

Artemas Ward, the most senior American commander in the area around Boston, stated in his report of the engagement:

Captain Mugford was very fiercely attacked by twelve or thirteen boats full of men, but he and his men exerted themselves with remarkable bravery, beat off the enemy, sunk several of their boats, and killed a number of their men; it is supposed they lost sixty or seventy. The intrepid Captain Mugford fell a little before the enemy left his schooner; he was run through with a lance while he was cutting off the hands of the pirates as they attempted to board him, and it was said that with his own hands he cut off five pairs of theirs... The Lady Washington... was attacked by five boats, which were supposed to contain near or quite a hundred men; but after repeated efforts to board her they were beaten off by the intrepidity and exertions of the little company, who gloriously defended the Lady against the brutal ravishers of liberty.

== Namesake ==
Two United States Navy ships, USS Mugford, have been named for him.
