= Henry Francis Evans =

British naval officer

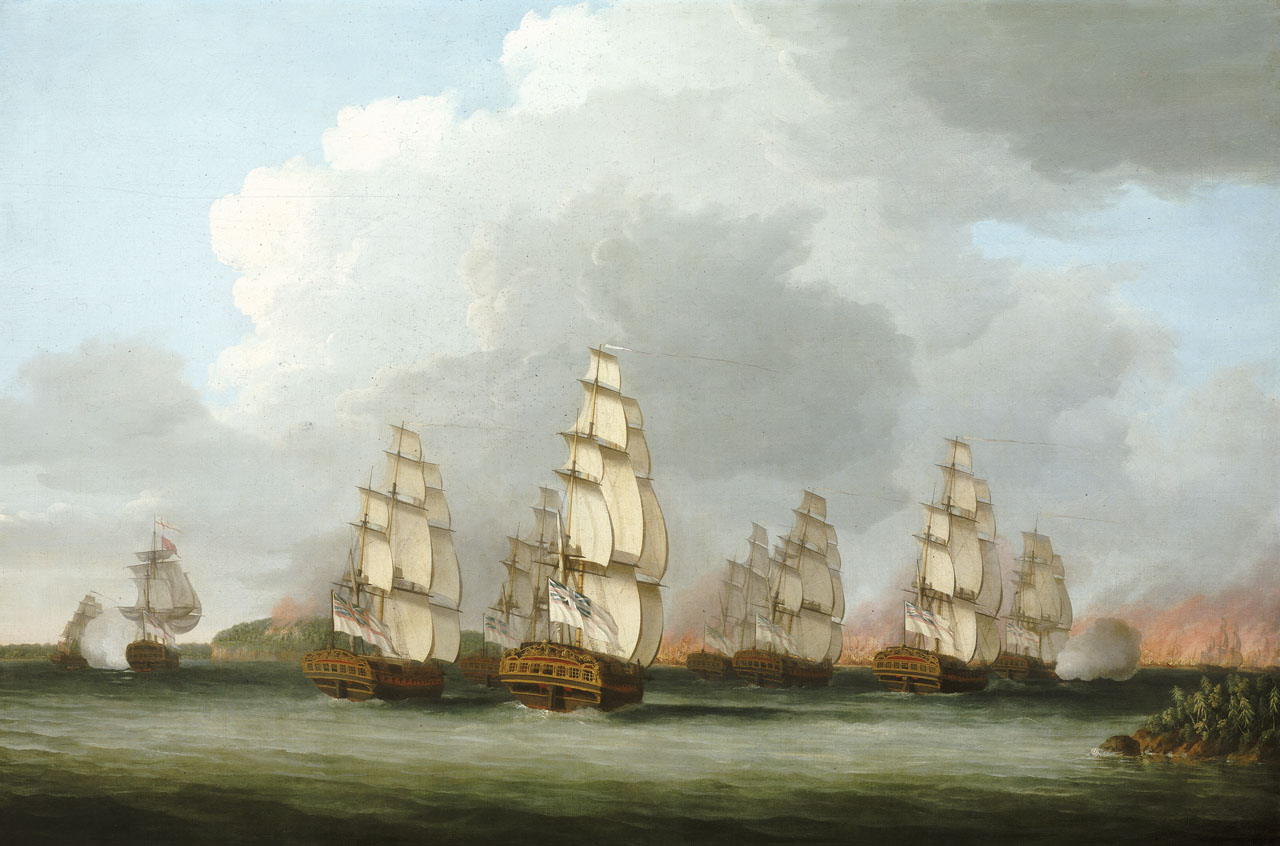
Destruction of the American Fleet at Penobscot Bay by Dominic Serres. Captain Evans in the Raisonnable seen here in the far left background firing into Hunter on the Penobscot Expedition

Captain Henry Francis Evans ( – 21 July 1781) was a British Royal Navy officer who fought with distinction in the American Revolutionary War. He fought in the Penobscot Expedition, the Siege of Charleston and the Battle of Cape Breton, where he was killed in action and later buried in St. Paul's Church (Halifax).

== HMS Raisonnable ==
Captain Henry Francis Evans took command of HMS Raisonnable on 5 December 1778, and in May of the following year, took part in an assault on Hampton Roads, commanding the flagship of Commodore Sir George Collier's squadron. On 1 June Raisonnable was in action on the Hudson River, during which two forts were captured. In August, with Collier embarked, Raisonnable sailed to Penobscot, where British forces were under heavy siege. Immediately after arriving, Collier's squadron of 7 ships engaged a rebel fleet of 41 vessels, of which 2 were captured, and the rest were either sunk or destroyed to prevent capture.

In January 1780, Raisonnable was part of Vice Admiral Mariot Arbuthnot's squadron which took part in the siege of Charleston, South Carolina, although Raisonnable, along with the 5 other third rates in the squadron, was sent back to New York before the siege began. Captain Evans left the ship on 14 May 1780.

== HMS Charlestown ==
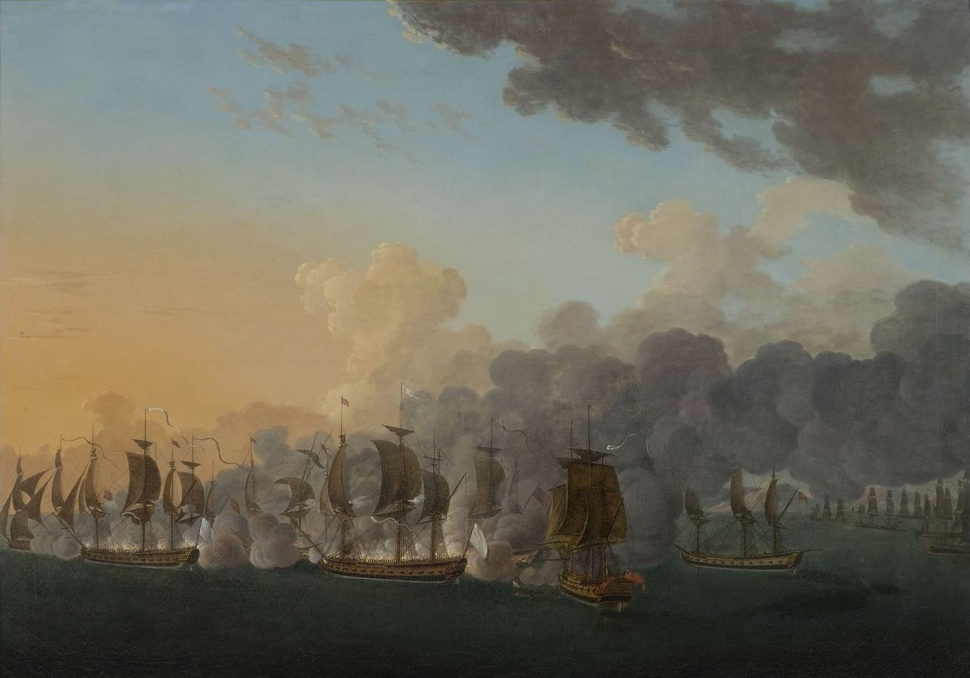
Naval battle off Cape Breton (Combat Naval A La Hauteur De Louisbourg) by Auguste-Louis de Rossel de Cercy on display at the Musée Nationale de la Marine in Rochefort

HMS Charleson, under Captain Henry Francis Evans, and HMS Vulture, brought Atalanta into Halifax. Then Charlestown sent in two American privateers that she had taken, Flying Fish and Yankee Hero.

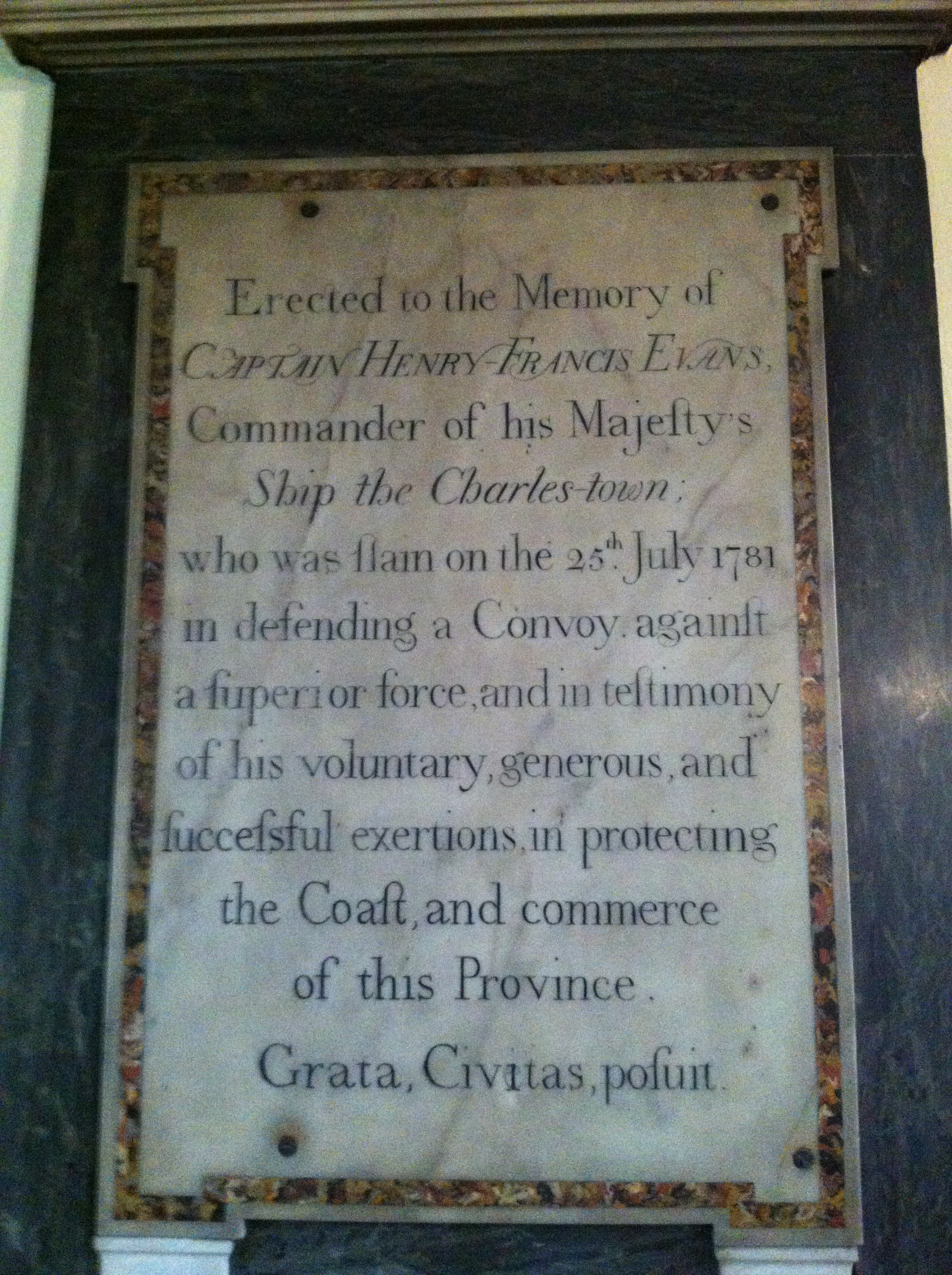
Captain Henry Francis Evans, St. Paul's Church (Halifax)

Next, Charlestown took part in the action of 21 July 1781. She was one of five Royal Navy ships escorting a convoy of 13 colliers and merchant vessels. The escorts also included the two sloops-of-war Allegiance and Vulture, the armed transport Vernon, and Jack, another small armed merchant ship. The convoy was off the harbor of Spanish River, Cape Breton, Nova Scotia (present-day Sydney, Nova Scotia), or Île Royale, when it came under attack from two French frigates Astrée, commanded by La Pérouse, and Hermione, commanded by Latouche Tréville, resulting in the Naval battle of Louisbourg. The French captured Jack. Charlestown struck to the French frigates but they were unable to take possession of her; French accounts state that she escaped in the dark. The French lost six men killed and 34 wounded; the British lost some 17 or so men killed and 48 wounded. Charlestown alone lost 8 men killed, including Evans, and 29 men wounded. The merchant vessels and their cargoes of coal entered Spanish River safely. Charlestown and the sloops sailed back to Halifax.

== See also ==
- Nova Scotia in the American Revolution
