= George baronets =

Extinct baronetcy in the Baronetage of the United Kingdom

The George Baronetcy, of Park Place in the County of Middlesex and of St Stephen's Green in the County of Dublin, was a title in the Baronetage of the United Kingdom. It was created on 18 September 1809 for Captain Sir Rupert George, First Commissioner for Conducting the Transport Service (b Dublin 1749, d Dublin 1823) married Magaret daughter of Thomas Cochrane by his first marriage, and their daughter Charlotte married 28 February 1820 her cousin Richard Verity of Dean House, Huntington (son of Isaiah Verity of Ash Hall Glamorgan). The title became extinct on the death of the second Baronet in 1856. The Georges were a County Laois family, whose estate was at Clophook near Stradbally.

Denis George, younger brother of the first Baronet, was a Baron of the Court of Exchequer (Ireland) from 1794 to 1821; they were the sons of Denis George of Clophook and Saint Stephen's Green, and his wife Sarah Young.

== George baronets, of Park Place and St Stephen's Green (1809) ==
- Sir Rupert George, 1st Baronet (1749–1823), commander in the action of 21 July 1781
- Sir Rupert Dennis George, 2nd Baronet (1796–1856), provincial secretary of Nova Scotia

Baronetage of the United Kingdom
Preceded by Irving baronets	George baronets Park Place and St Stephen's Green; 18 September 1809	Succeeded by Roberts baronets
