= HMS Allegiance =

Sloop of the Royal Navy

HMS Allegiance was the American vessel King George, which the British captured in 1779 and brought into the Royal Navy as a sloop armed with fourteen 6-pounder guns. The French captured her in 1782, and the British recaptured her in 1783, but did not take her back into service.

== Origins ==
King George is an improbable name for an American vessel during the American War of Independence. She was probably a British vessel that Americans had captured, and that the British recaptured before she had been renamed. There are at least two candidate vessels, with one in particular being the British privateer brigantine King George, of 14 guns, Captain Stanton Hazard, that the Connecticut sloop Revenge captured in August 1779. However, currently there is insufficient information to give a definite answer, positive or negative.

== Career ==
The Royal Navy commissioned Allegiance under Commander David Phips (or Phipps), an American Loyalist.

On 24 February 1781, Allegiance entered Frenchman Bay, Maine, and put a landing party ashore at Point Harbour. The landing party captured Captain David Sullivan, brother of Major-General John Sullivan, of the Continental Army, and James Sullivan, later governor of Massachusetts.

The highpoint of Allegiance's career occurred in the action of 21 July 1781. Allegiance was one of three Royal Navy ships and two armed vessels escorting a convoy of 13 unarmed merchant vessels carrying coal. The escorts comprised frigate Charlestown, the two sloops Allegiance and Vulture, the armed transport Vernon, and Jack, another armed ship, but smaller. Vernon was carrying troops from the 70th Regiment of Foot, who were to work in the coal mines.

The convoy was off the harbour of Spanish River, Cape Breton, Nova Scotia (present-day Sydney, Nova Scotia) when it came under attack from two French frigates: Astrée (38), commanded by La Pérouse, and Hermione (34), commanded by Latouche Tréville. The French captured Jack. Charlestown reportedly struck to the French, but they were unable to take possession. The French lost six men killed and 34 wounded; the British lost some 17 or so men killed, including Captain Henry Francis Evans of Charlestown, and 48 wounded. Allegiance was not heavily engaged. The merchant vessels entered Spanish River safely before the action started. Charlestown and the sloops sailed back to Halifax, under the overall command of Phips, in Allegiance.

In separate later engagements the French frigates captured three merchant vessels and recaptured the privateer Thorn.

== Fate ==
Allegiance was anchored in Boston harbour on 6 August 1782 when Admiral the Marquis de Vaudreuil sailed in with ten ships-of-the-line. Allegiance was unable to escape and so Phips surrendered to the French 74-gun Northumberland. The French Navy bought her in November or December.

On 14 October 1782, the sloop Tartar, tender to Allegiance, libeled the sloop Sally in the Halifax Vice admiralty court.

Pegasus recaptured Allegiance on 23 January 1783. The French were using her as a transport and she was carrying 200 troops. The British apparently took her back to Jamaica but did not take her back into service.
