= Irving baronets =

Extinct baronetcy in the Baronetage of the United Kingdom

Escutcheon of the Irving baronets of Woodhouse and Robgill Tower

The Irving Baronetcy, of Woodhouse and Robgill Tower in the County of Dumfries, was a title in the Baronetage of the United Kingdom. It was created on 10 September 1809 for General Paulus Irving, previously Commander-in-Chief of the West Indies. By his wife Lady Elizabeth St Lawrence (died 1799), daughter of Thomas St Lawrence, 1st Earl of Howth, he had two sons, each of whom inherited the title. The title became extinct on the death of the third Baronet in 1866.

== Irving baronets, of Woodhouse and Robgill Tower (1809) ==
- Sir Paulus Aemilius Irving, 1st Baronet (1751–1828)
- Sir Paulus Aemilius Irving, 2nd Baronet (1792–1838)
- Sir Thomas St Lawrence Irving, 3rd Baronet (1795–1859), younger son of the 1st Baronet.

Baronetage of the United Kingdom
Preceded by Seymour baronets	Irving baronets of Woodhouse and Robgill Tower; 10 September 1809	Succeeded by George baronets
