= Denis George =

Irish barrister and judge

Denis George (c.1751 – 1821) was an Irish barrister and judge who held office as Recorder of Dublin, and then as Baron of the Court of Exchequer (Ireland). He enjoyed a high reputation among his contemporaries for integrity and benevolence.

== Personal life ==
He was born in Dublin, third son of Denis George of St. Stephen's Green, whose country estate was at Clophook near Stradbally in County Laois, and his wife Sarah Young. His eldest brother Sir Rupert George became a post-captain, and was the first of the George baronets of Park Place and St. Stephen's Green.

Denis married Dorothea Moore, daughter of Edward Moore, Archdeacon of Emly and Ellen Dobson, of Mooresfort, County Tipperary in 1785, and they had five sons, including Richard (who died young in 1806) and two daughters, Ellen, who married into the prominent O'Grady family of Aghamarta Castle, County Cork, and the younger Dorothea, who married Richard Featherstonhaugh of Rockview, County Westmeath. Dorothea died in 1814 and was buried at St. Nahi's Church, Dundrum, beside her infant son Richard. Denis retired from the Bench in 1821 and died at his home, Coldblow House in Donnybrook, Dublin, later the same year.

== Career ==
Denis graduated with a Bachelor of Arts from Trinity College Dublin in 1773, entered Middle Temple in 1774 and was called to the Irish Bar in 1776. He was a commissioner in bankruptcy, became Recorder of Dublin in 1785 and was appointed a Baron of the Exchequer in 1794.

He was frequently called on to sit on special commissions to deal with political crime, notably after the Rebellion of 1798, the Irish Rebellion of 1803 (which was led by Robert Emmet) and the agrarian unrest caused by a secret society called The Threshers in 1806. His speech of welcome for the new Lord Mayor of Dublin, Henry Hutton, in 1803 shows how profoundly the Emmet Rising had shaken the ruling class, although he concluded optimistically that "the foul rebellion which disgraced our streets" had been defeated by firm Government action.

== Reputation ==
Even the harshest critics of the Irish judiciary at that time had nothing but praise for George: he was described as a man of stainless reputation and of "unrivalled humanity". There is an agreeable description of George and his wife wandering the grounds of Coldblow House each autumn to pick blackberries.
