= Musée national de la Marine (Rochefort) =

Coordinates: 45.9347°N 0.9578°W

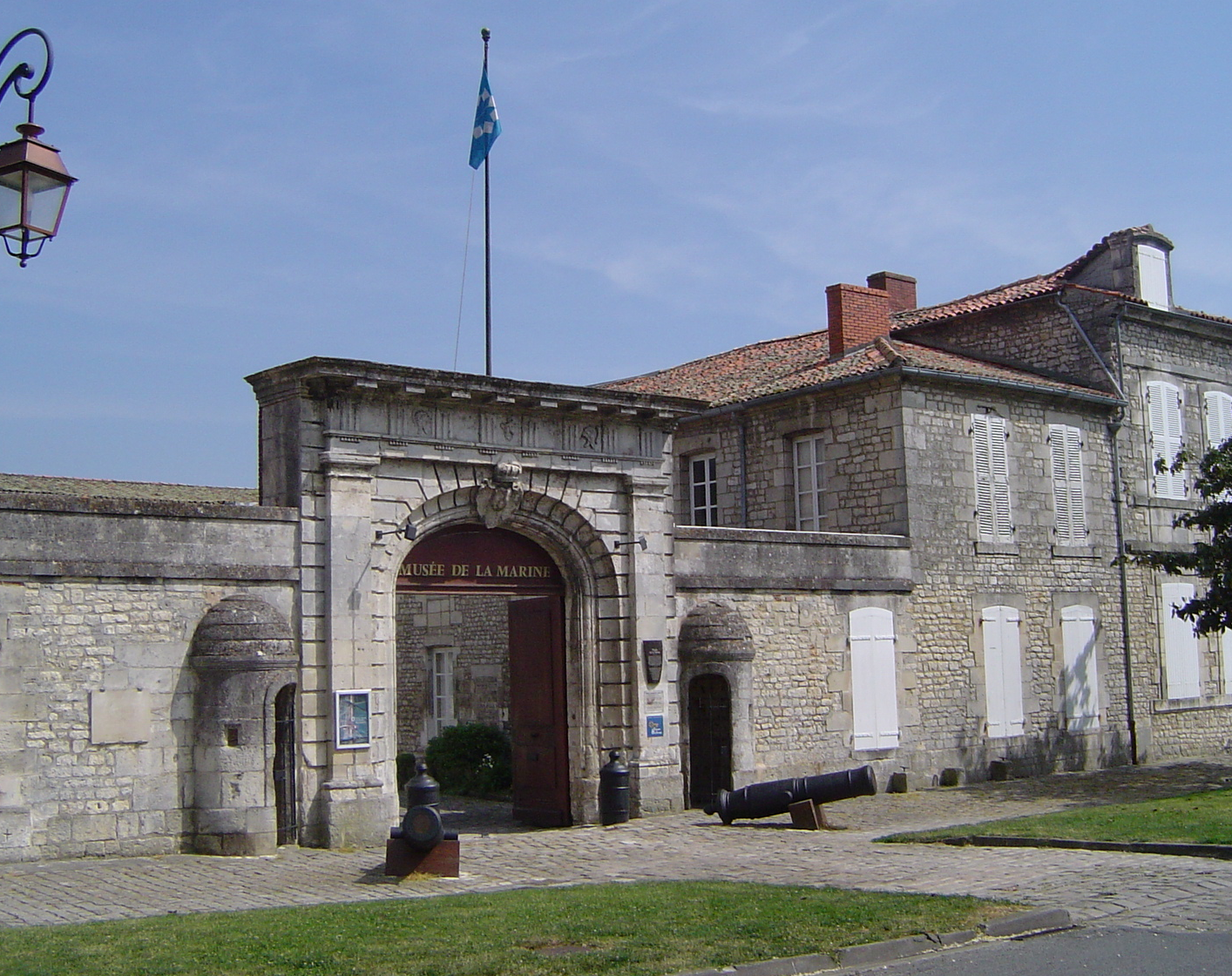
The Musée national de la Marine in Rochefort.

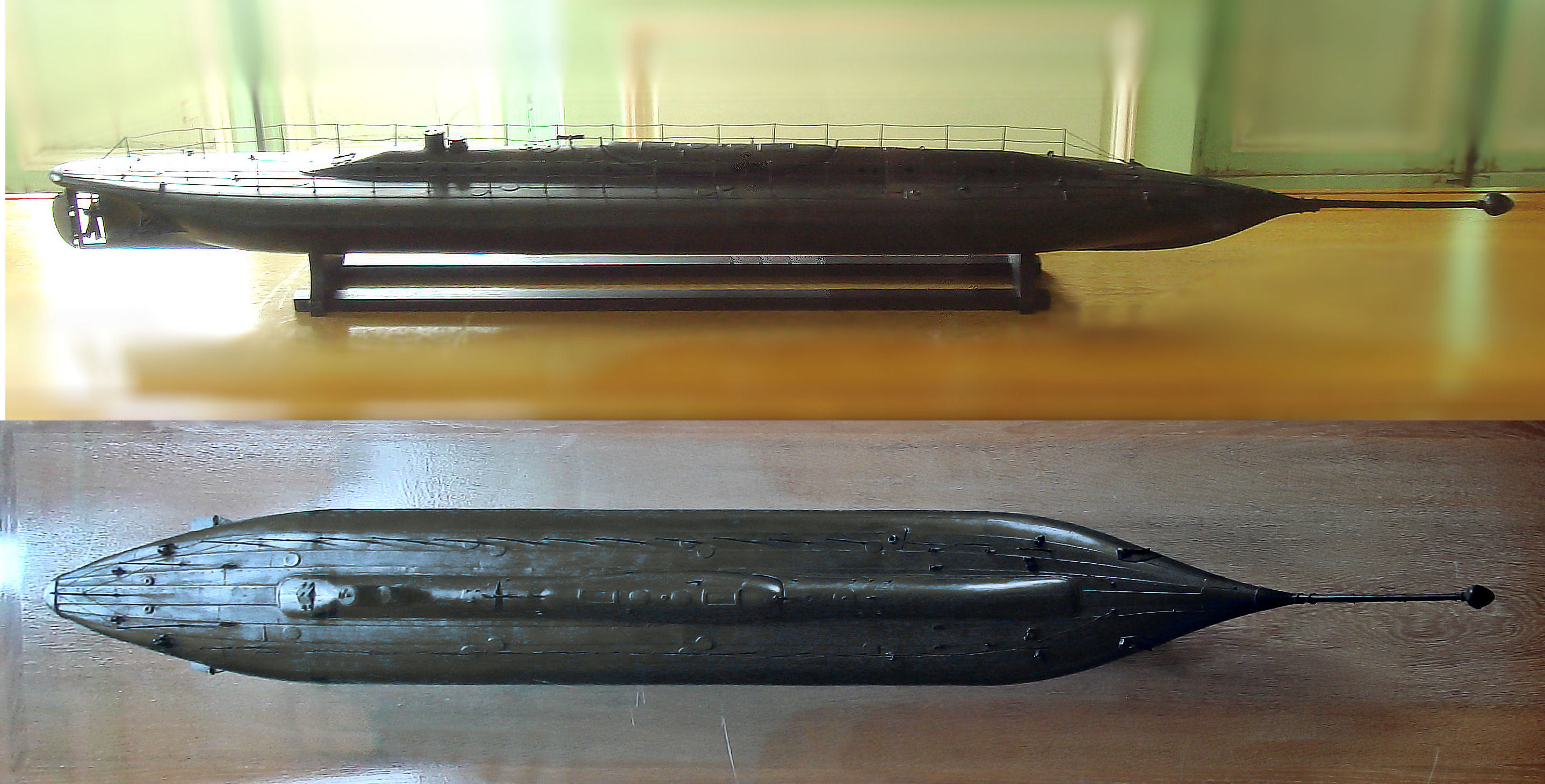
Model of Plongeur, made for the Exposition Universelle (1867).

The Musée national de la Marine in Rochefort is one of the main naval museums of France.

Rochefort Naval museum is part of the Musée national de la Marine, which is organised around its main location in Paris, and it antennas in Rochefort, Toulon, Brest and Port-Louis.

== Gallery ==
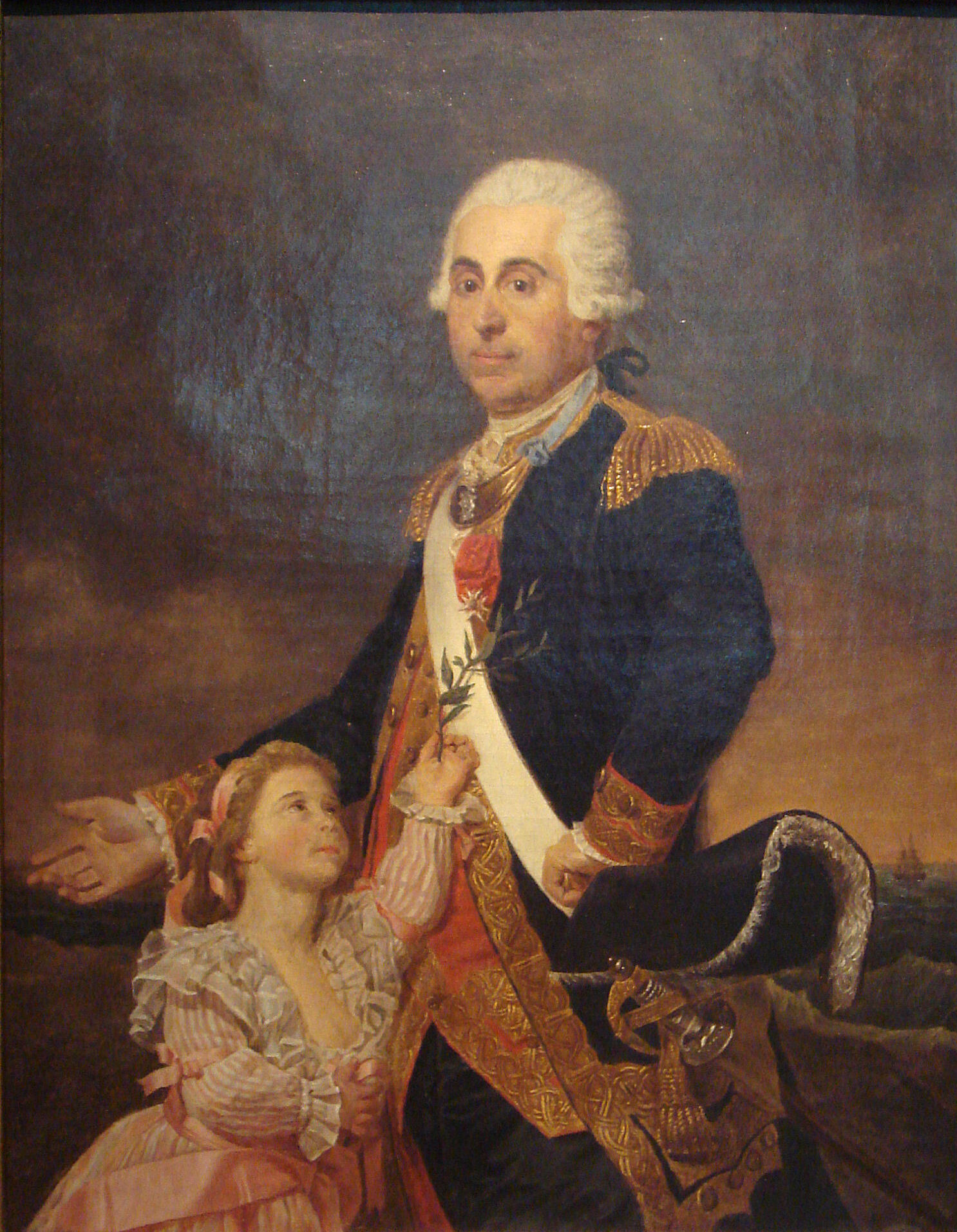
Auguste-Louis de Rossel de Cercy (1736-1804), self-portrait

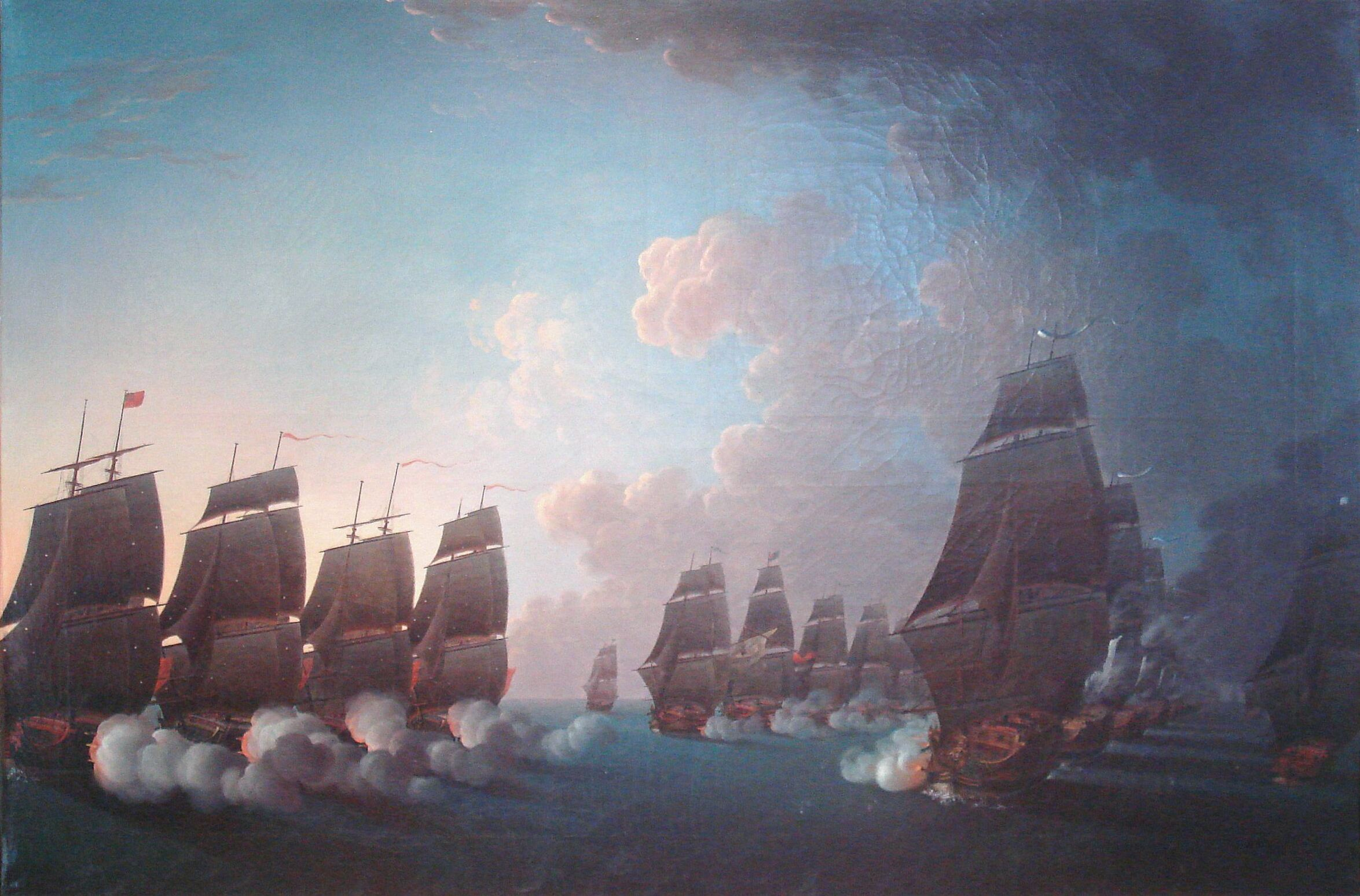
Combat de la Dominique, 17 April 1780.

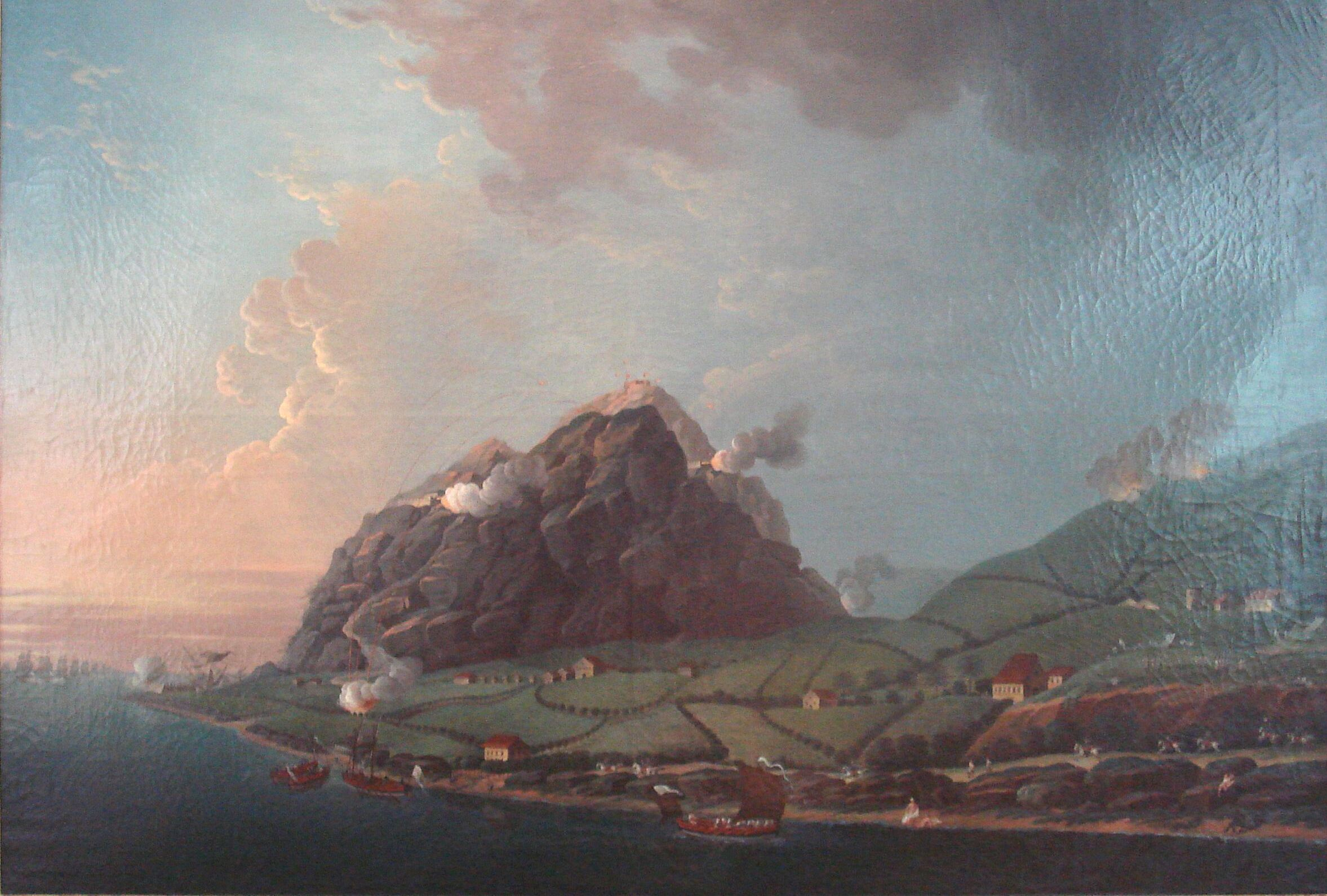
Prise des Iles de Saint-Christophe et de Nevis, 13 January 1782.
