= Rupert George =

British naval officer (b. 1747, d. 1823)

Captain Sir Rupert George Bt
- Born: 16 January 1749; St. Stephen’s Green, Dublin
- Died: 25 January 1823 (aged 74); Willesden House, Middlesex
- Military career
- Allegiance: United Kingdom
- Branch: Royal Navy
- Service years: c.1771–1801
- Rank: Captain
- Commands: HMS Avenger; HMS Vulture; HMS Amphitrite; HMS Charlestown; HMS Thisbe; HMS Hussar; North American Station
- Conflicts: American Revolutionary War; Action of 6 October 1779; Action of 21 July 1781; French Revolutionary War
- Awards: Baronet; Knight bachelor
- Other work: Commissioner of the Transport Board

Captain Sir Rupert George, 1st Baronet (16 January 1749, St. Stephen’s Green, Dublin, Ireland – 25 January 1823, Willesden, London Borough of Brent, Greater London, England) was a British naval officer in the American Revolution, became the Commodore for the Royal Navy's North America Station (1792-1794). He then returned to England and became the first Commissioner of the Transport Service, where he stayed for 22 years.

He was the eldest son of Denis George and Sarah Young. In addition to their house at St. Stephen's Green, the family had a country estate at Clophook near Stradbally, County Laois. Denis George, Recorder of Dublin and later one of the Barons of the Court of Exchequer (Ireland), was his younger brother.

== American Revolution ==
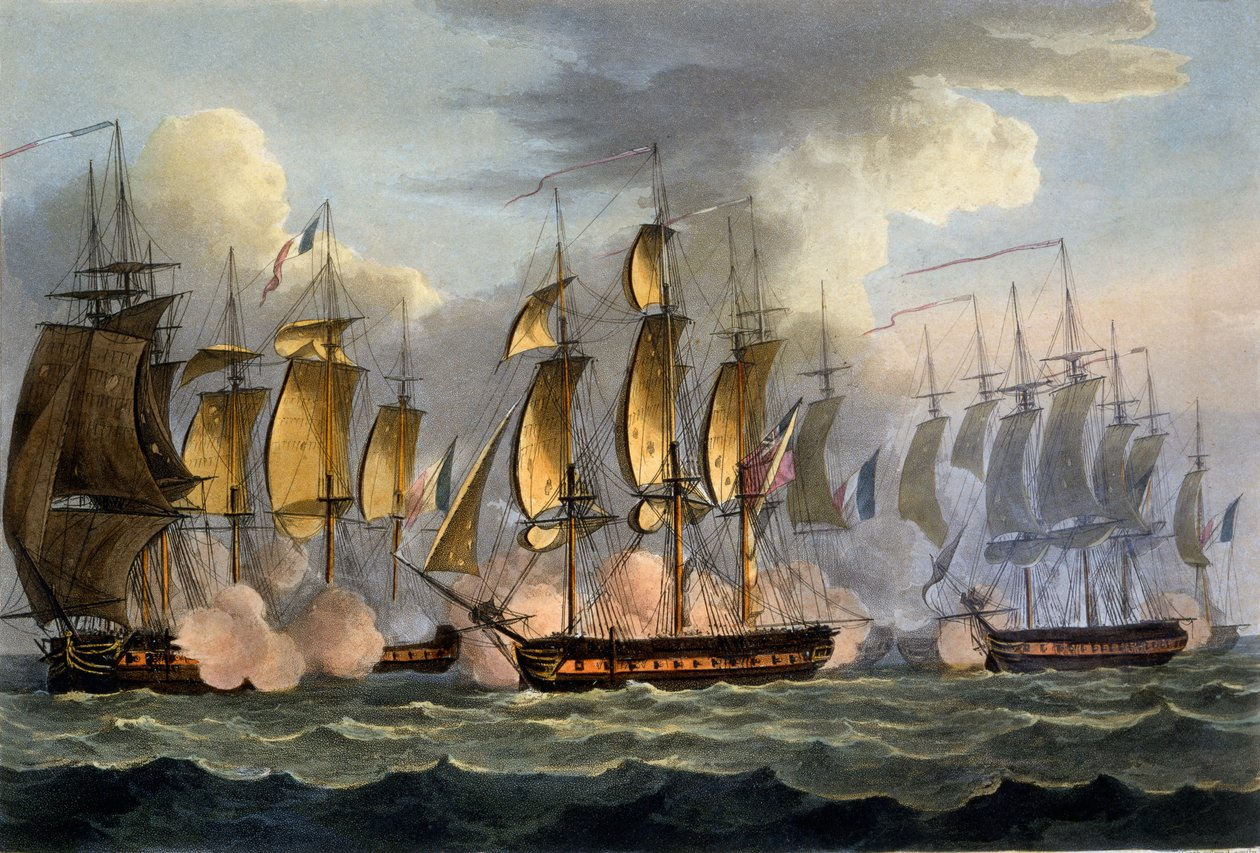
HMS Hussar (far right), Captain George's ship while at the North America Station in Halifax, Nova Scotia (1792-1794)

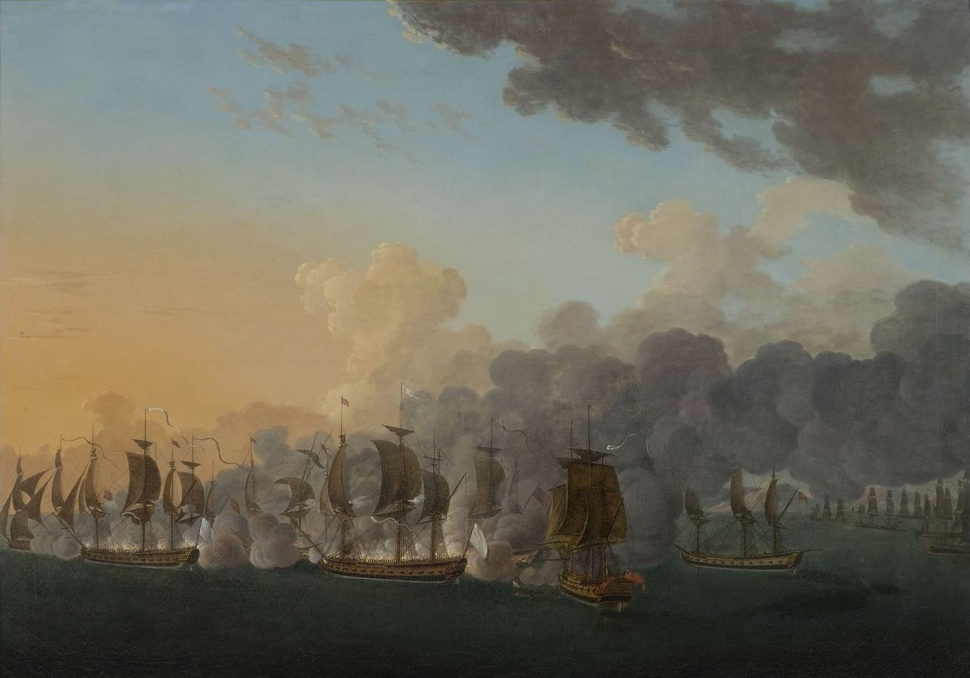
Captain George in the Battle off Cape Breton

George became a Lieutenant serving on the Rose (1770), Enterprise (1775) and Robust (1779).

In the American Revolution, he fought on HMS Quebec with Captain George Farmer in the action of 6 October 1779. The following year he sailed on HMS Griffin and captured the French Privateer 'Le Général Villepatoux'. In February 1781, he commanded HMS Avenger. In 1781, he was the captain of HMS Vulture, where he fought in the action of 21 July 1781.

On 12 August 1781, while commanding HMS Charlestown, George captured the privateer Harlequin. In November he was promoted to post-captain. While in command of Charleston, on 21 February 1782 took over Nararro and Philadelphia. In March he captured the de la Floride-Orientale and de la Georgie. He later joined HMS Thisbe (1790), which he sailed out of Nova Scotia.

== French Revolutionary Wars ==
From 1792 to 1794, during the French Revolutionary Wars, George served as the Commodore of the North America Station, commanding His Majesty's Naval Force on the Coasts of Nova Scotia and New Brunswick. He commanded the only ship of war attached to the North America Station. He sailed the Hussar (1792) out of the Mediterranean for Newfoundland. In March 1792 he captured two privateers, Republicaine and Jou-Jou. On 12 May, he arrived with the new Governor, John Wentworth after a five week crossing from Falmouth. In May 1793, he captured the St. Pierre.

The first press warrant granted in Nova Scotia was in April 1793, when Wentworth granted a warrant to Commander Rupert George of HMS Hussar. George sent press gangs from Hussar into Halifax. In one night they detained 50 to 60 men, including several Liverpool mariners, and brought them aboard Hussar.

He was promoted to Chairman of the Transport Board (1795). He served in the position for 22 years, through seven administrations (until 1817). During this time he was responsible for the "care and custody" of the French prisoners of war held in the Norman Cross Prison. He was knighted in 1803 and created a baronet in 1809.

== Family ==
He was buried in a vault at the centre of the plot in front of the portico of St Mary's Church, Battersea, England. (Also buried in the vault are Nova Scotians John Inglis and George's wife Margaret Cochran, daughter of Thomas Cochran by his first marriage. Bishop Inglis also has a monument in the north gallery of the church.)

His oldest son Samuel Hood George was sent to Nova Scotia (where his mother's family still lived) with the new Governor Sir George Prevost to become the Provincial Secretary (1808-1812), after which he returned to England and died (1813).

His second oldest son Rupert Dennis George then departed for Nova Scotia to take his older brother's position as Provincial Secretary (1813-1827). He also became the second and last Baronet (1813). He also was the Aide-de-camp during Lieutenant Governor Sir Peregrine Maitland's command of the Nova Scotia militia. Joseph Howe was the next Provincial Secretary and complained about George's handling of the position.

== See also ==
- Nova Scotia in the American Revolution

Baronetage of the United Kingdom
New creation	Baronet (of Park Place and St Stephen's Green); 1809–1823	Succeeded by Rupert George
