= Vernon (1779 ship) =

History

Great Britain
- Name: Vernon
- Launched: 1775, Bordeaux
- Acquired: circa 1779
- Fate: Wrecked December 1792

General characteristics
- Tons burthen: 460, 470, or 500 (bm)
- Armament: 8 × 9-pounder + 12 × 6-pounder guns (1783)

Vernon was launched at Bordeaux in 1775, almost certainly under another name. She first appeared in British records in 1779. Between 1781 and 1782, she was an armed transport and in 1781 took part in an action that cost her 13 crew members killed and wounded. After the war she traded widely. In 1787 she carried emigrants to Sierra Leone for the Committee for the Relief of the Black Poor. She was wrecked in December 1792.

== Career ==
Vernon first appeared in Lloyd's Register (LR) in 1779.

Year	Master	Owner	Trade	Source & notes
1779	Francis Hall	Robertson	London transport	LR
1781	F.Hall	Robertson	London–New York	LR
1782	F.Hall	Robertson	Portsmouth transport	LR

Between 1781 and 1782, Vernon served as an hired armed storeship.

On 10 September 1781, Captain Hall, of the transport Vernon was at Cork, from where he wrote a letter with a report of the action of 21 July 1781 in which she had been involved. She had sailed from Halifax in a convoy of 13 colliers and merchant vessels escorted by HMS Charlestown, the two sloops-of-war Allegiance and Vulture, and Jack, like Vernon an armed merchant ship, though much smaller. The convoy was off the harbor of Spanish River, Cape Breton, Nova Scotia (present-day Sydney, Nova Scotia), or Île Royale, when on 21 July two French frigates Astrée, commanded by La Pérouse, and Hermione, commanded by Latouche Tréville, attacked. Vernon exchanged broadsides with the frigates, the broadsides causing casualties on Vernon and much damage. The action continued for three glasses and 20 minutes before the French frigates withdrew. British casualties included Captain Evans an eight people killed and 14 wounded on Charles-town. Vernon suffered six killed and seven wounded. Vulture had had one man killed and three wounded. The merchant vessels and their cargoes of coal had entered Spanish River safely before the action had started. Charlestown and the escorts, including Vernon, sailed back to Halifax.

In the action of 16 March 1782, HMS Success fought, captured, and burned the 34-gun Spanish frigate Santa Catalina off Cape Spartel. Success was escorting the storeship Vernon to Gibraltar. At the time, Vernon was under the command of Mr. John Falconer. She left her escort the day the engagement started and continued on to Gibraltar.

Year	Master	Owner	Trade	Source & notes
1783	F.Hall; J.Elliot	Robertson	Portsmouth transport	LR
1784	J.Ellison; John Shaw	Robertson	London–Jamaica	LR

Vernon, Shaw, master, safely rode out a hurricane on 30 July 1784 at Jamaica.

On 2 January 1785 as Vernon, Shaw, master, was on her way toEngland she encountered a gale that caused minor damage.

Year	Master	Owner	Trade	Source & notes
1786	Gill	John St Barbe	London–Jamaica	LR

In late 1786 in London the Committee for the Relief of the Black Poor chartered Vernon and two other vessels, Atlantic, and Belisarius, to carry emigrants from London to what was to be a new settlement in Sierra Leone.

On 11 January 1787, Atlantic, Muirhead, master, and Belisarius, Sill, master sailed from Gravesend, bound for Sierra Leone. Vernon delayed leaving London to take on some more migrants, but then sailed to join the other two vessels and their escort at Portsmouth.

Bad weather forced them to divert to Plymouth, during which time about 50 passengers died. Another 24 were discharged, and 23 ran away. Eventually, with some more recruitment, 411 passengers sailed to Sierra Leone in April 1787.

Atlantic, Bellisarius, and Vernon, Gill, master, sailed from Portsmouth on 23 February under escort by the sloop-of-war HMS Nautilous.

The four vessels were reported to have been safe at Tenerife on 24 April and had been expected to sail to Sierra Leone that night. Ninety-six passengers died on the voyage from Portsmouth to Sierra Leone.

Year	Master	Owner	Trade	Source & notes
1787	Stevenson	St. Barbe	London–Africa	LR; repairs 1785
1789	Stevenson	St. Barbe	London–New York	LR; repairs 1785 & damages & good repair 1789
1790	Stevenson	St. Barbe	Bristol–London	LR; repairs 1785 & damages & good repair 1789
1791	W.Barryman	St. Barbe	Bristol–London; London–Tobago	LR; repairs 1785, damages & good repair 1789, & thorough repair 1790
1792	W.Barryman	Dick & Co.	London–Dunkirk	LR; damages & good repair 1789, & thorough repair 1790

== Fate ==
In December Vernon, Barriman, master, was driven ashore east of Ostend and it was feared that she would be lost. She was on a voyage from Dunkerque to Tobago. NLL281292

Vernon was last listed in 1793 with data unchanged since 1792.
