= Edward Moore (Archdeacon of Emly) =

Irish Anglican priest (1714–1788)

Edward Moore (1714–1788) was an Irish Anglican priest.

Moore was born at Mooresfort in County Tipperary, son of Edward Moore senior, and was educated at Trinity College, Dublin. He had at least one sister Elizabeth, who married as his second wife John Lysaght, 1st Baron Lisle and had issue. He was Archdeacon of Emly from 1782 until 1788.

He married Ellen Dobson and had at least three daughters: Ellen, who married William Pennefather of Darling Hill, Tipperary, MP for Cashel, Mary, who married William's cousin Thomas Pennefather of Marlow, and Dorothea (died 1814), who married Denis George, Recorder of Dublin, and later one of the Barons of the Court of Exchequer (Ireland).
