= Action of 21 July 1781 =

Naval battle

- Part of the American Revolutionary War
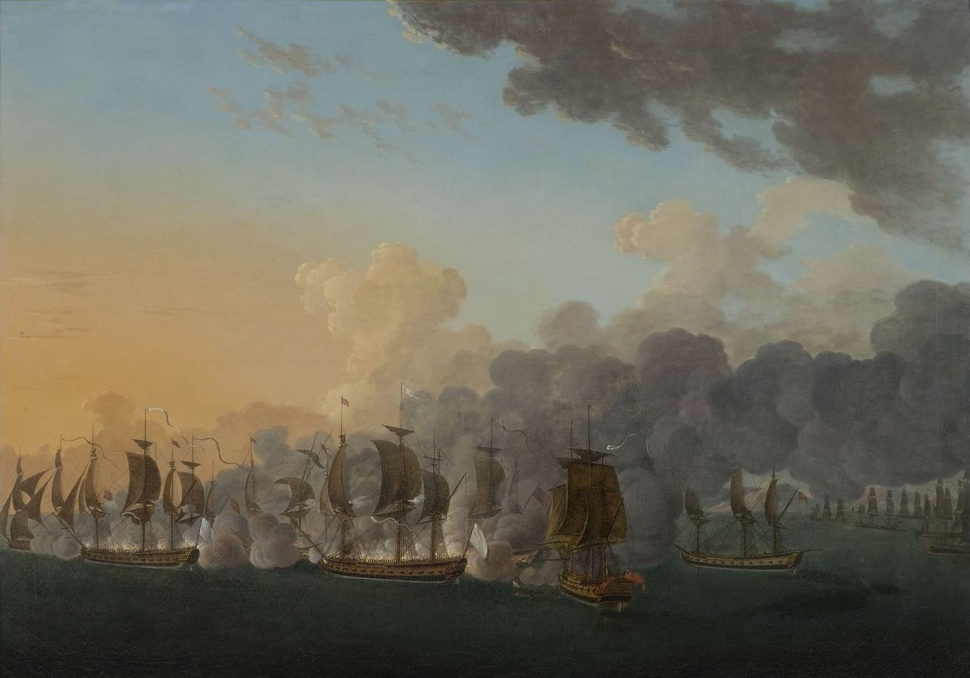
- Naval battle off Louisbourg, 21 July 1781; Auguste-Louis de Rossel de Cercy, 1788
Date	21 July 1781
Location	Off Cape Breton Island, Atlantic Ocean 45.9075°N 59.9739°W
Result	French victory

Belligerents
France	Great Britain

Commanders and leaders
Comte de Lapérouse; Latouche Tréville	Henry Francis Evans †; Rupert George; Richard Tonge (POW)

Strength
2 frigates	1 frigate 2 sloops 1 storeship 1 merchant ship

Casualties and losses
6 killed 34 wounded	17 killed 42 wounded 1 merchant ship captured

The action of 21 July 1781 (French: Combat naval en vue de Louisbourg, or Combat naval à la hauteur de Louisbourg) was a naval skirmish off the harbour of Spanish River, Cape Breton, Nova Scotia (present-day Sydney, Nova Scotia), during the War of American Independence. Two light frigates of the French Navy, captained by Jean-François de Galaup, comte de Lapérouse and Louis-René Levassor de Latouche Tréville, engaged a convoy of 18 British ships and their Royal Navy escorts. The French captured one of the British escorts while the remainder of the British convoy escaped.

== Background ==
Even since France had lost its colonies in Canada in the Seven Years' War, it had been seeking opportunities to tip the balance of power in America in its favour, and had been in contact with American separatists since the 1770s. The start of the American Revolution thus quickly yielding the outbreak of the Anglo-French War in 1778, and with the Franco-American alliance defined by the Treaty of Alliance of 1778, France entered the War of American Independence.

Lafayette had already been supporting the Continental Army since 1777, in a private capacity. When he returned to France, Louis XVI received him and sent back as an emissary to George Washington on Hermione in March 1780. On 11 June 1780, the French reinforced their naval presence with the arrival of the Expédition Particulière, under Admiral Ternay. Hermione stayed around Boston, carrying out reconnaissance for the squadron and engaging in commerce raiding.

In June 1781 Hermione was attached to a frigate division under Lapérouse, recently promoted to Captain after capturing HMS Ariel, with his flag on Astrée. Both ships were light frigates, designed for speed, coppered, and armed with 26 12-pounder long guns, a larger calibre than that carried by most privateers, but under-powered against larger naval ships. The two ships cruised off Pennsylvania, preying on British merchantmen, privateers, and smaller naval ships.

In the morning of 21 July, Astrée and Hermione detected a 20-ship convoy, with two corvettes or frigates detaching to investigate. The convoy, which consisted of 18 merchant vessels, including nine colliers and four supply ships, was bound for Spanish River on Cape Breton Island to pick up coal for delivery to Halifax. The escorts were the frigate Charlestown (Charleston) (28), the sloops Allegiance (24) and Vulture (20), the storeship Vernon (14), and Jack (14), a small armed ship commanded by Richard Peter Tonge.

== Action ==
As Astrée and Hermione approached the convoy, four further escorts joined the two that were sailing to meet them, while the convoy tried to escape to Spanish River. Five of the British warships, Charlestown, Allegiance, Vernon, Vulture and Jack, formed a line of battle. Lapérouse maneuvered to try to prevent the convoy from escaping, and it was not until 1830 that Astrée came in cannon range and opened fire. The French had the advantage in gunnery, as the British had 9-pounder guns, less powerful than the French 12-pounders.

Astrée concentrated her fire on the British flagship Charlestown, which sought support from the two ships preceding her, but Hermione then overtook Astrée and for 30 minutes she also fired broadsides into her. Charlestown stopped, but doing so she fell in Astrée' line of fire again, while Hermione was free to fire on Jack at point-blank range. Jack struck her colours. Soon afterward, the maintop of Charlestown fell; with her captain dead, Charlestown also struck.

By nightfall, the three remaining British warships were trying to escape, chased by Hermione. Astrée took possession of Jack and signaled Hermione to take possession of Charlestown, but by then Charlestown had established a jury rigging and she escaped into the darkness under her first officer, Lieutenant Michael Cashman. Hermione and Astrée gave chase but failed to find her again, and by 2200 they abandoned the pursuit.

Meanwhile, Captain Rupert George of Vulture led the damaged escorts into a safe harbour. While the British escort was severely damaged, the convoy was still able to pick up a load of coal at Spanish River and deliver it to Halifax.

Six French and seventeen British sailors were killed in the action. Hermione had three killed, six gravely wounded (three of whom died in the following days), and 13 lightly wounded; Astrée had three killed and 15 wounded. Hermione had sustained a dozen hits, was holed in three places, and had suffered two fires during the action. Charleston had 8 killed and 29 wounded; Allegiance, 1 killed and 5 wounded; Vulture, 1 killed and 2 wounded; and Vernon, 7 killed and 6 wounded, totaling 17 killed and 42 wounded on the British side.

After effective temporary repairs, Astrée and Hermione returned to Boston, arriving on 17 August.

== Aftermath ==
Learning of their presence, the British scrambled three heavy frigates to intercept Astrée and Hermione, but the division did not meet and the French frigates returned safely to Boston. Tonge and his crew were taken prisoner to Boston. The French sent Jack to Boston with a prize crew, as they had done with four other ships that they had captured in the previous days: the 18-gun corvette Thorn, captured on 12 July; the 12-gun merchantman Friendship, captured on 17; the 8-gun merchantman Phoenix, captured on 18; and the merchantman Lockard Ross, taken on 19 July. The British recaptured Friendship and Lockard Ross while in transit.

Jack was sold at Salem, only to be recaptured the following year in the Naval battle off Halifax. (Captain Tonge later commanded the Little Jack, which after a brief skirmish with two American privateers in Canso, took American prisoners to Quebec.)

Lapérouse and Latouche were at first irritated by Charleston's escape, but expressed regrets when they learnt that Evans had died of his wound. Lapérouse called him "a very brave man". American privateers attacked British mining on Cape Breton throughout the war. In 1788, Auguste-Louis de Rossel de Cercy painted a large depiction of the battle. The painting is now on display at the Musée national de la Marine in Paris.

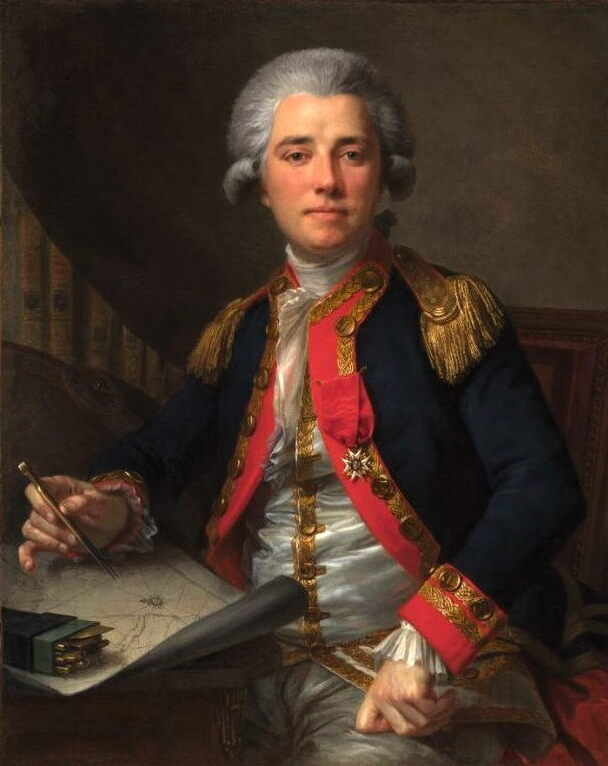
Lapérouse in 1778, then a Lieutenant

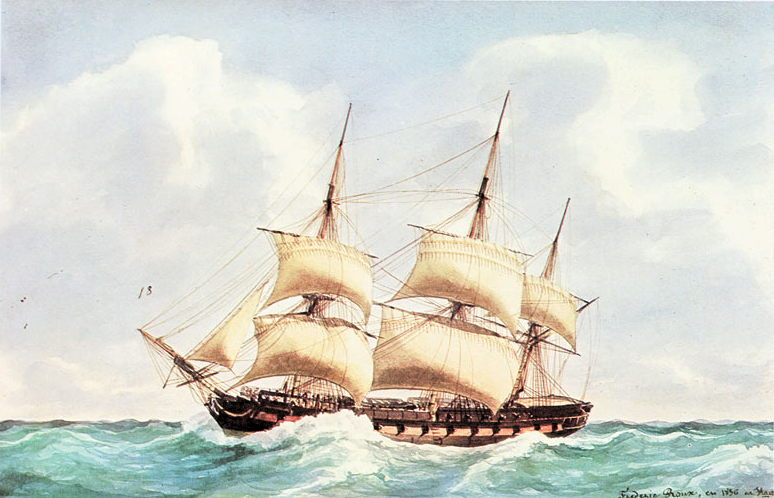
Watercolour portrait of Astrée by François Roux

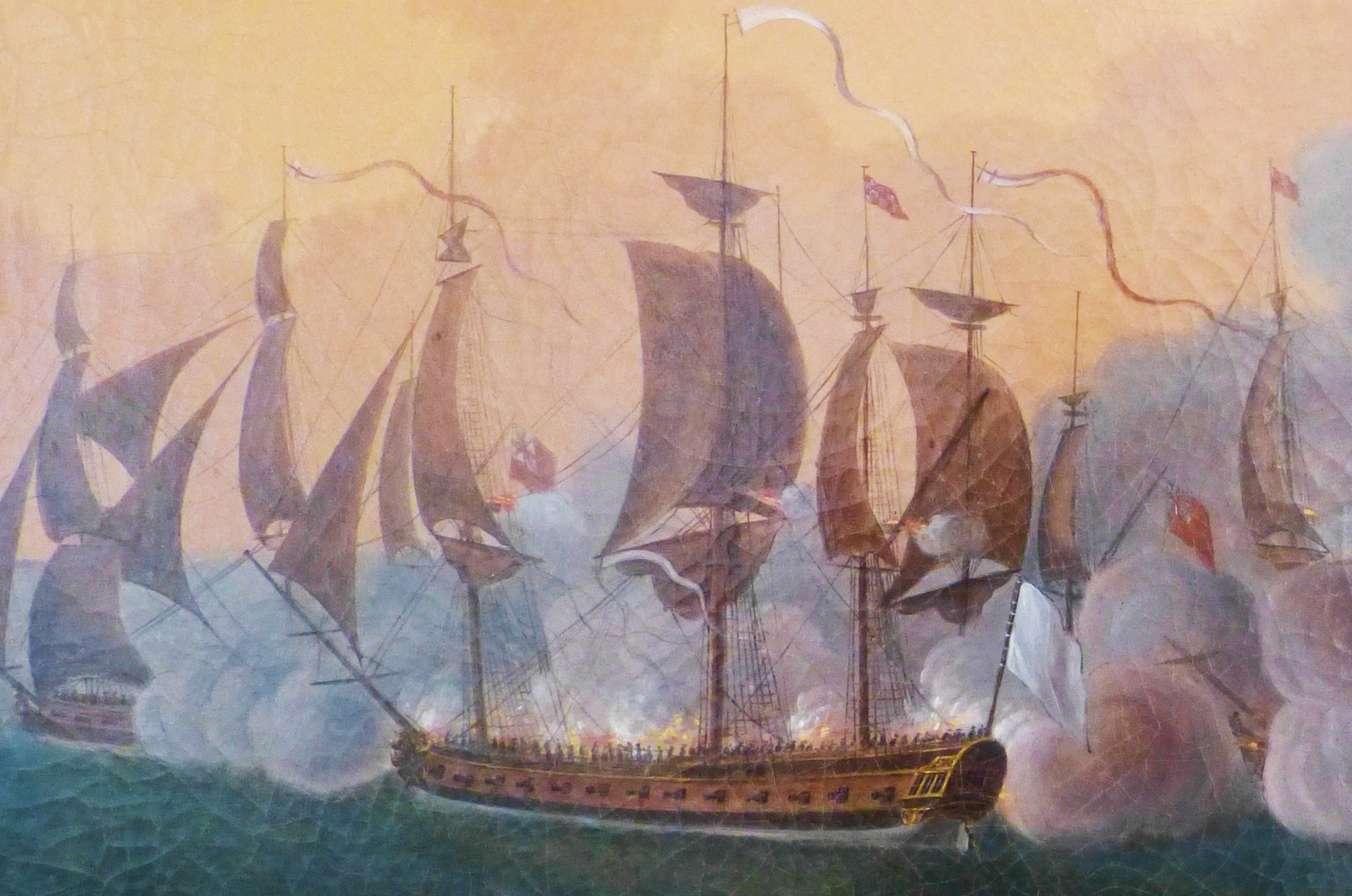
Hermione (detail of Cercy's Naval Battle Off Louisbourg)

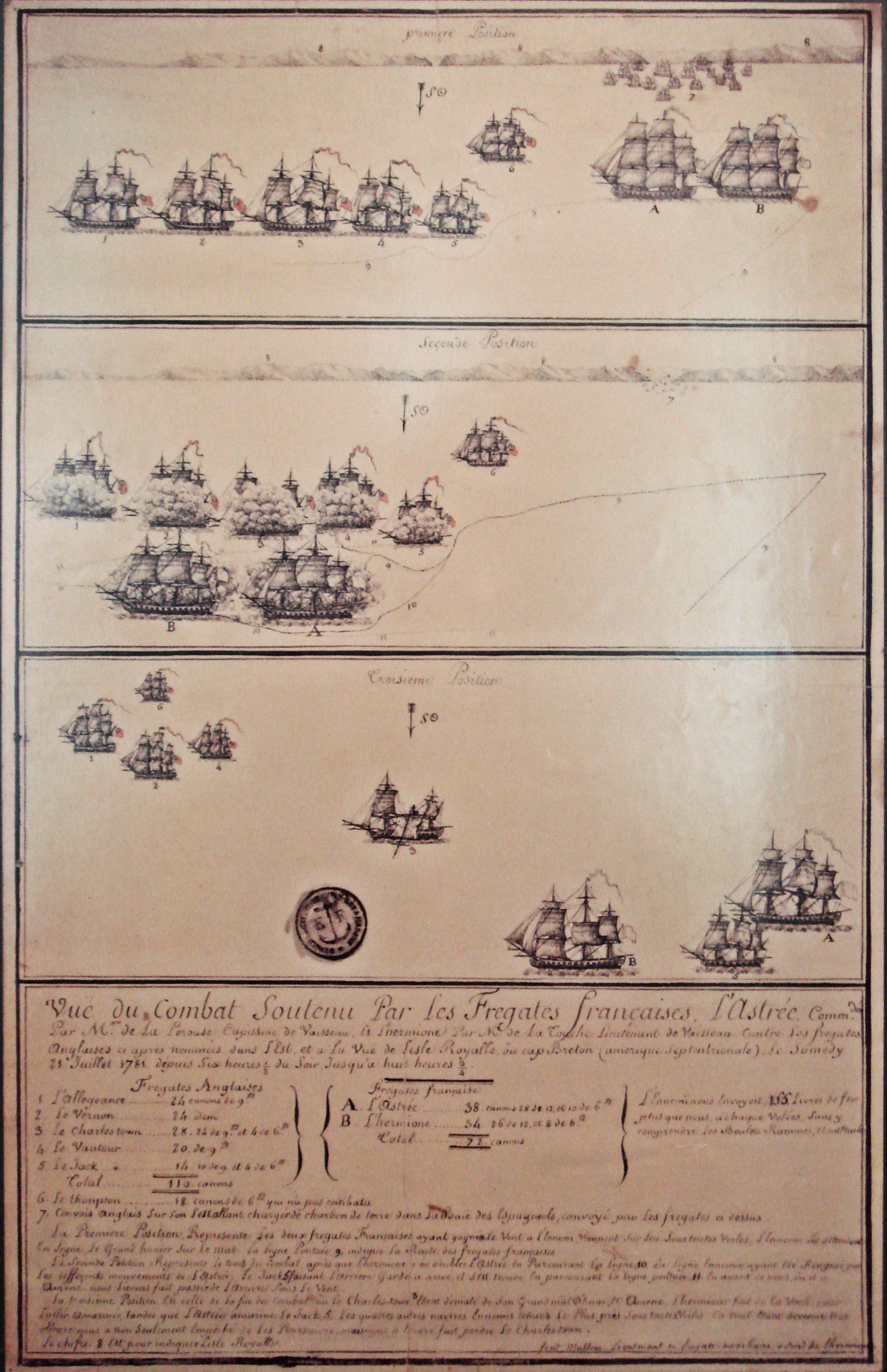
Description of the order of battle by Lieutenant de Frégate auxillaire Mullon, who was aboard the Hermione the day of the battle.

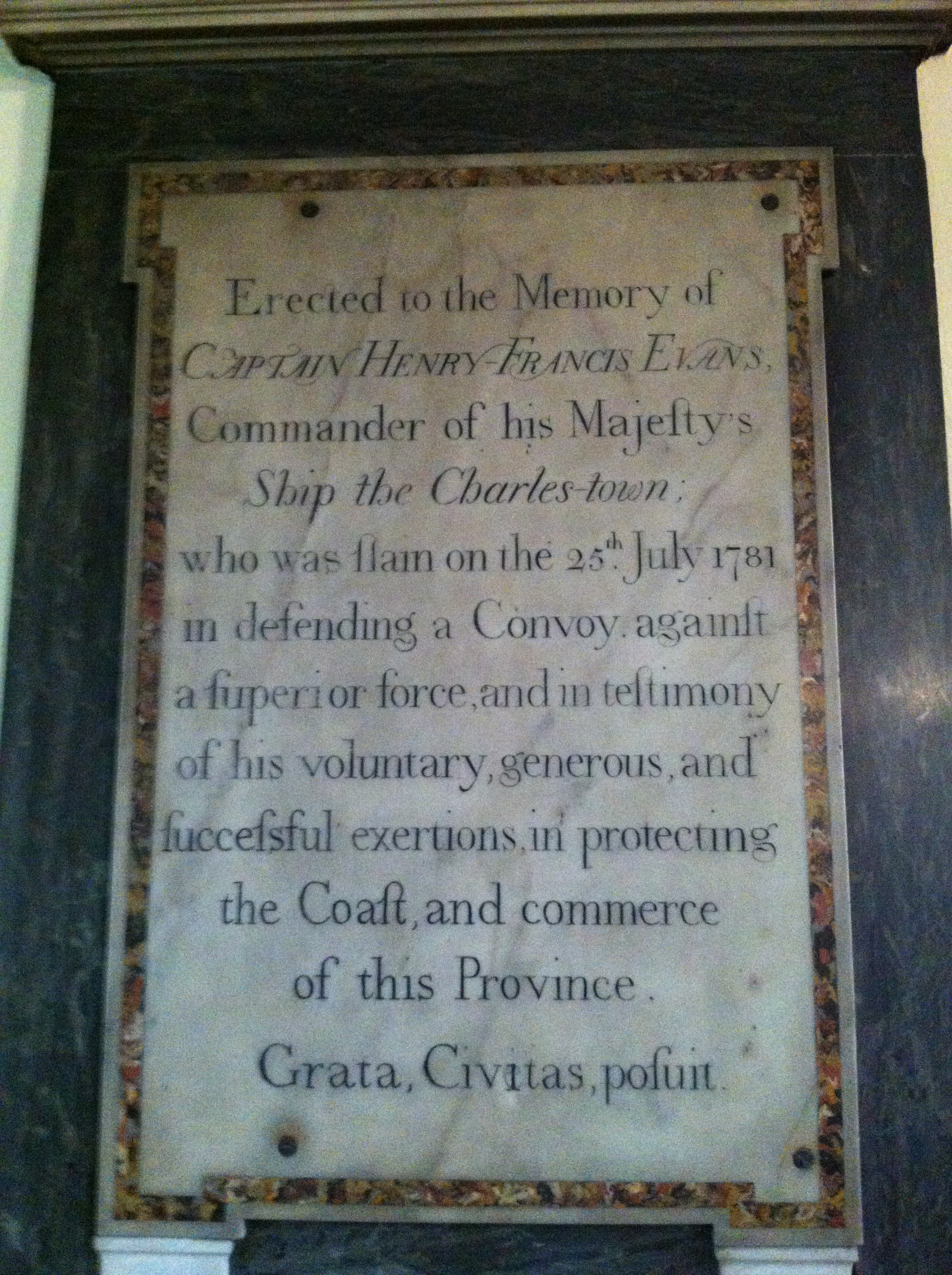
Capt Henry Francis Evans Memorial, St. Paul's Church (Halifax), Nova Scotia

== Order of battle ==
British fleet
Ship	Rate	Guns	Commander	Casualties			Notes
Ship	Rate	Guns	Commander	Killed	Wounded	Total	Notes
HMS Charlestown	Fifth rate	34	Captain Henry Evans	8	29	37	
HMS Allegiance	Sloop	24	Commander David Phips	1	5	6	
HMS Vulture	Sloop	24	Lieutenant Rupert George	1	2	3	
Vernon	Storeship	24		7	6	13	
Jack	Merchantman	14					

French fleet
Ship	Rate	Guns	Commander	Casualties			Notes
Ship	Rate	Guns	Commander	Killed	Wounded	Total	Notes
Astrée	Fifth rate	32	Captain Jean-François de Galaup, comte de Lapérouse	6	15	21	
Hermione	Fifth rate	32	Captain Louis-René Levassor de Latouche Tréville	6	15	21	
