= Auguste-Louis de Rossel de Cercy =

French Navy officer and painter (1736–1804)

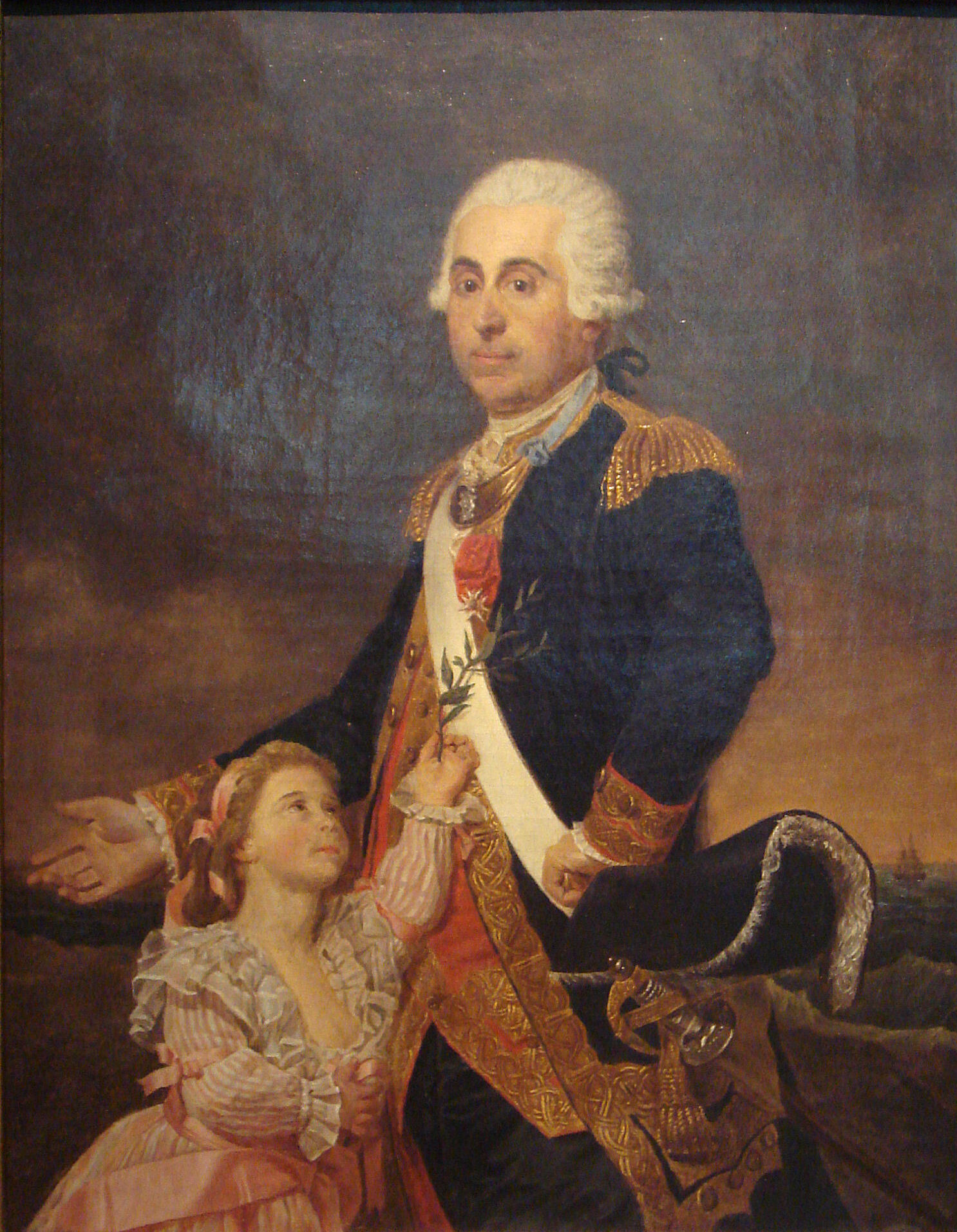
- Self-portrait, 1784
- Born: 22 June 1736; Dompierre-sur-Mer, France
- Died: 27 February 1804 (aged 67) Paris, France
- Allegiance: France
- Branch: French Navy
- Service years: 1751–1779
- Rank: Ship-of-the-line captain

Ship-of-the-line Captain Auguste-Louis de Rossel de Cercy (22 June 1736 – 27 February 1804) was a French Navy officer and painter who specialised in marine art.

== Life ==
Cercy was born in Dompierre-sur-Mer in 1736 from an aristocratic family. He joined the French Navy as a Garde-Marine in 1751 in Rochefort. In 1752, he was appointed to Friponne. In 1754, he transferred on the 50-gun Aigle, and the year after on the 64-gun Inflexible. In 1756, he served first on the frigate Aquilon, and then on the 80-gun Duc de Bourgogne, and the year after on the 64-gun Saint Michel. From 1759, Cercy served on the frigates Aragon, Sardaigne and Oiseau, before transferred to the ship Content. In 1765, Cercy was promoted to ship-of-the-line lieutenant. The year after, he served on Coulisse. In 1770, he was first officer on the 64-gun Bizarre. In 1773, he was made a Knight in the Order of Saint Louis. In 1775, he was appointed to the frigate Zéphir.

In 1779, he retired with the rank of ship-of-the-line captain. He started painting around that time. In 1778, he illustrated the action of 17 June 1778 between Belle Poule and HMS Arethusa, the action of 15 February 1783 between Concorde and HMS Magnificent. The year after, he painted the action of 17 August 1779 between Junon and Gentille against HMS Ardent, and the Battle of Martinique. He also painted the Battle of Martinique of 1780. At the Salon de la Correspondance in 1786, he showed landscapes of Malta and Constantinople. That same year, Louis XVI decided to have depictions of the French naval victories of the War of American Independence made, and he chose Cercy to make them. He died in 1804 in Paris.

== Gallery ==
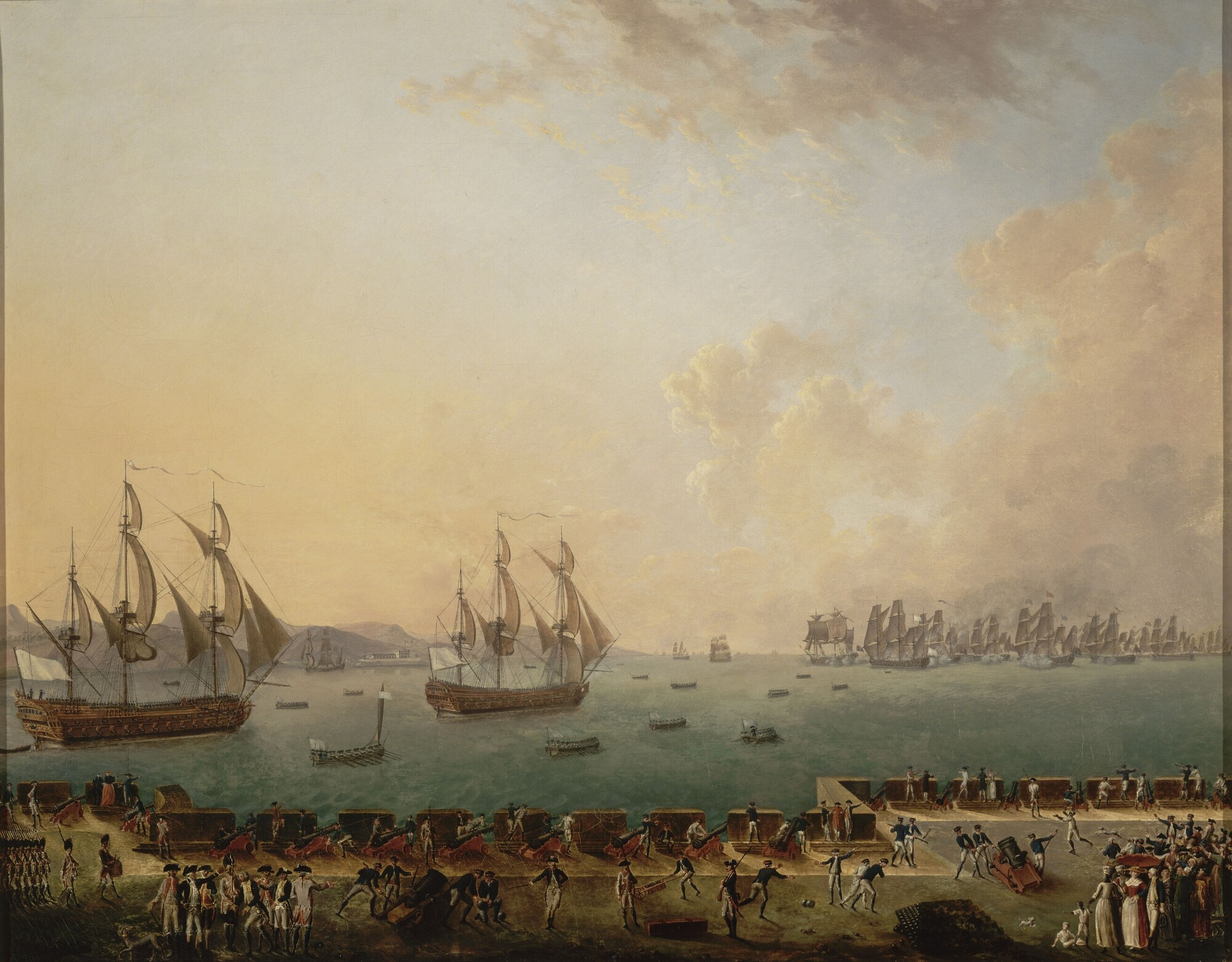
Naval battle in the harbour of Fort Royal in Martinique, 18 December 1779 (Date unknown)

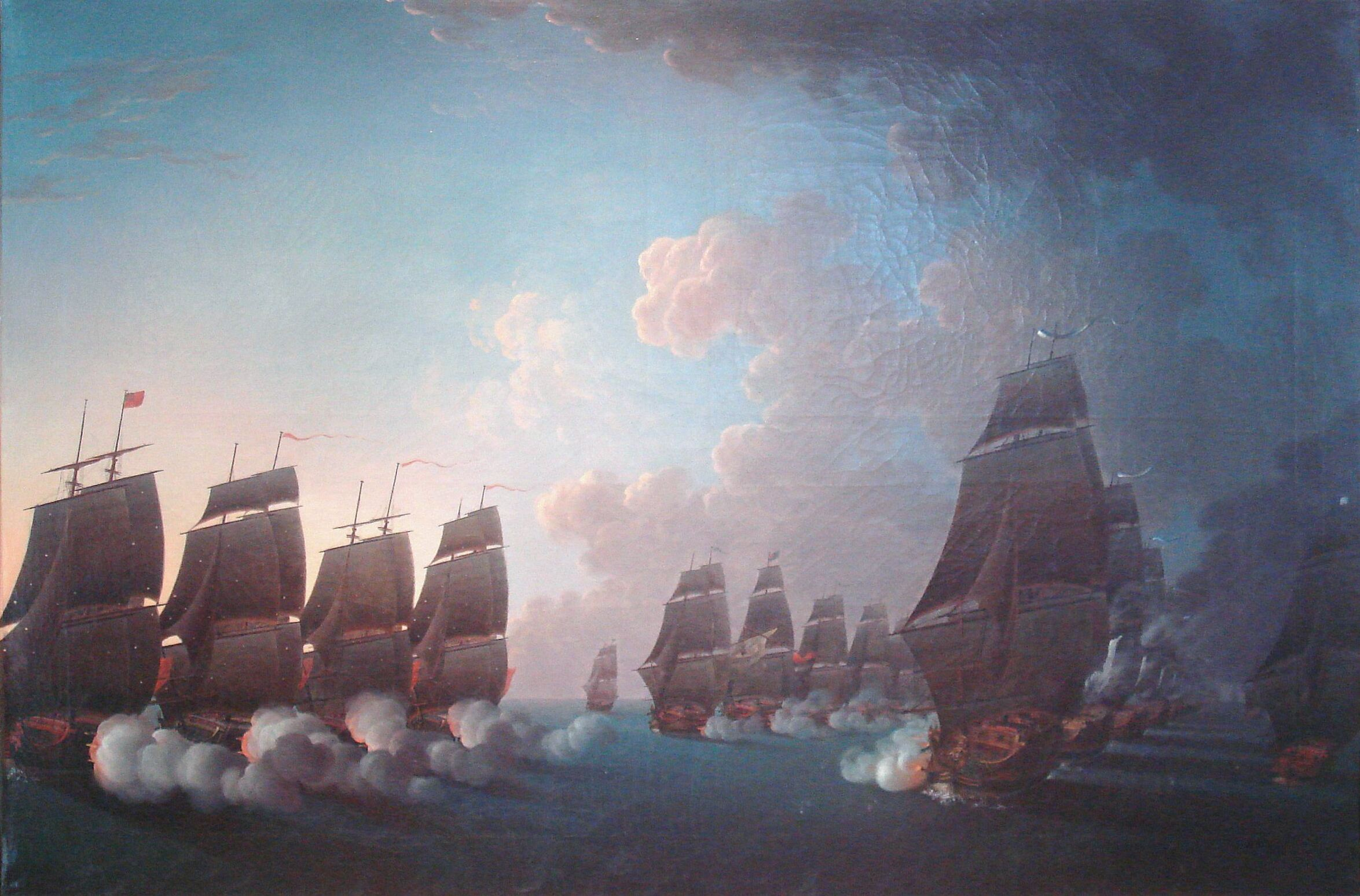
Battle of Dominica, 17 April 1780 (Date unknown)

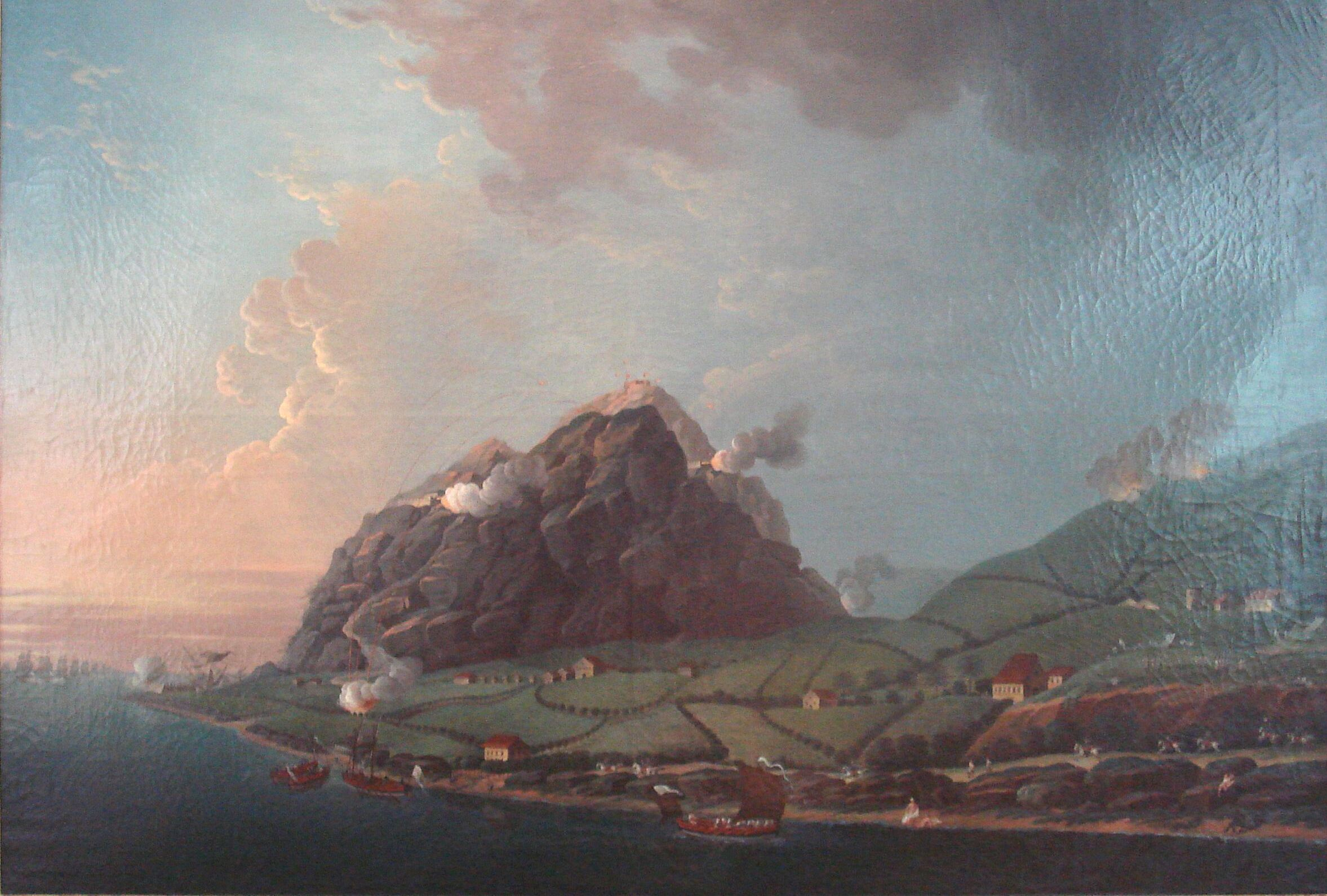
Taking of the islands of Saint Christopher and Nevis, 13 January 1782 (Date unknown)

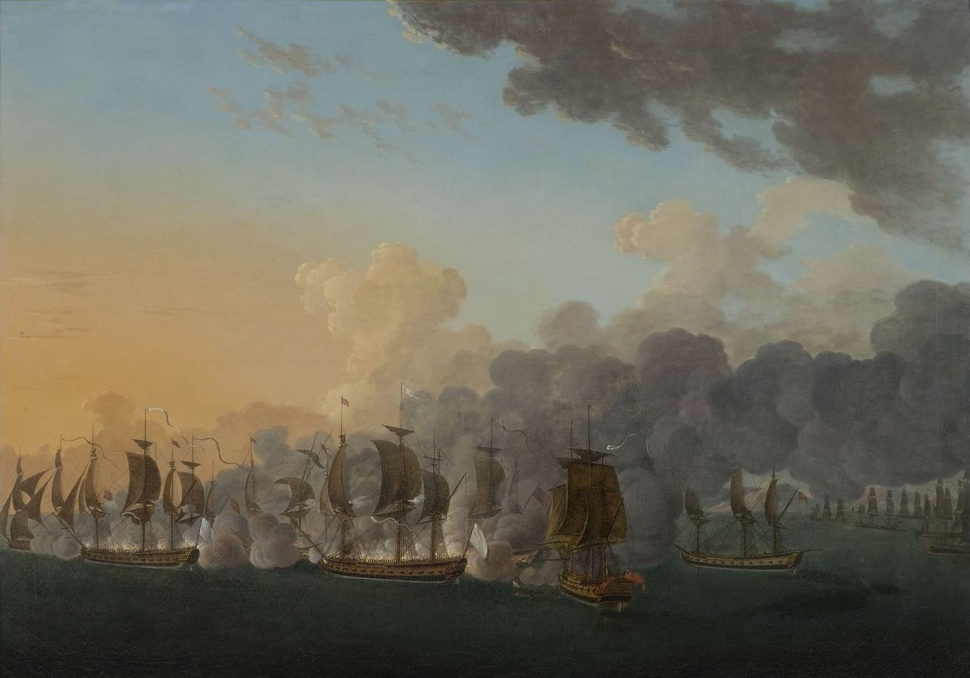
Naval battle off Louisbourg, 21 July 1781 (1788)

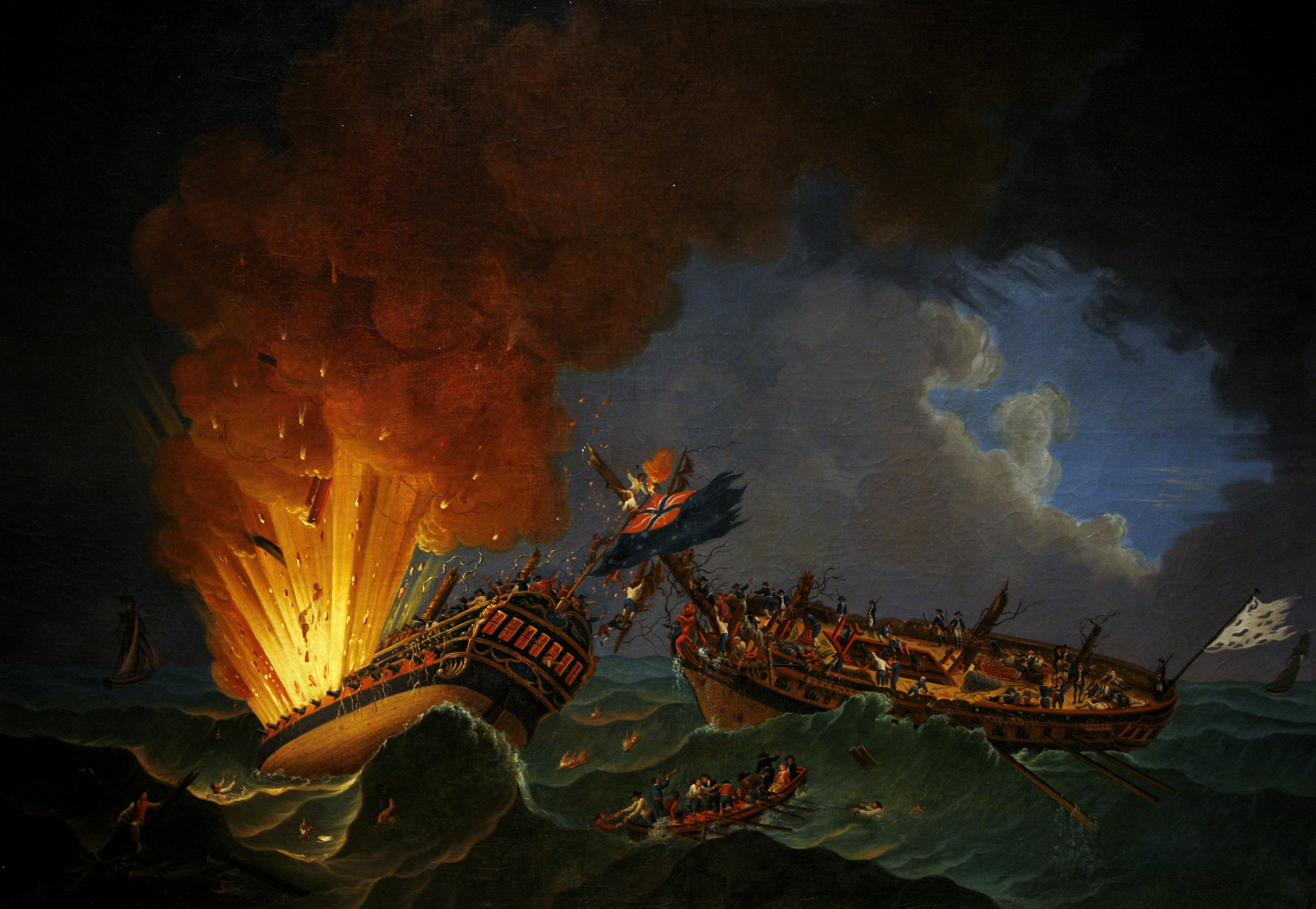
Fight of the Surveillante against the Quebec (1789)

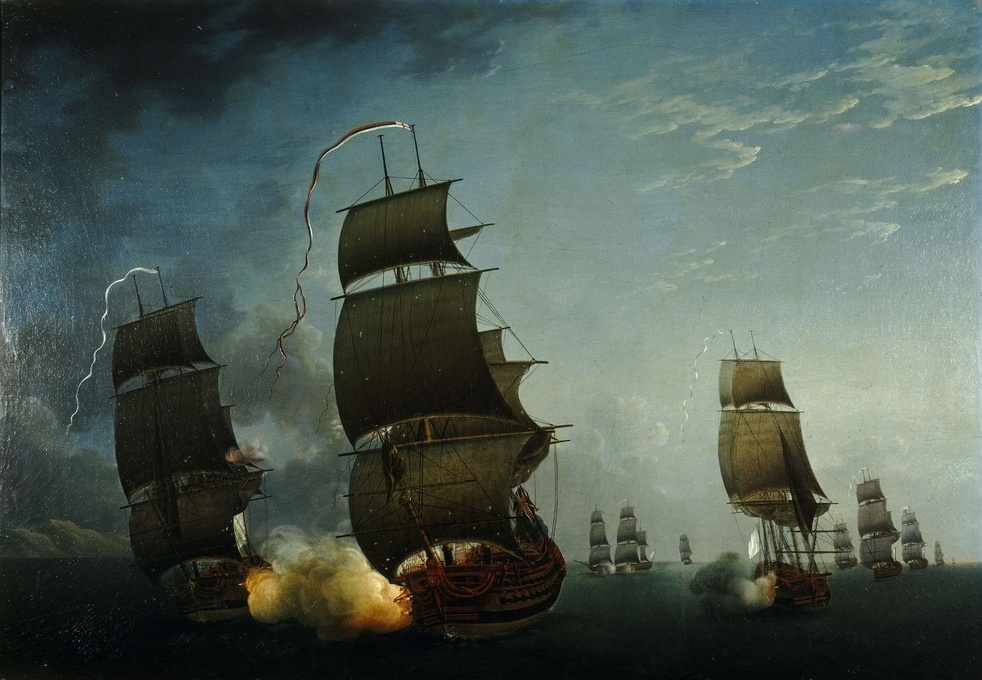
Battle of the French frigates Junon and Gentille against the English ship Ardent and the English frigate Fox, August 17, 1779 (1790)

== Bibliography ==
- Kernéis, Auguste Aimé (1892). Les frégates la Surveillante et la Nymphe. Brest: Société académique de Brest.
- Mourot, Marjolaine (2016). "Les tableaux de combat : la dernière commande royale". In Besselièvre, Jean-Yves (ed.). Le port de la liberté : Brest au temps de l'Indépendance américaine. Paris: Locus solus, Musée national de la Marine.
- Rostaing McMann, Evelyn (2003). Biographical index of artists in Canada. Toronto: University of Toronto Press. ISBN 9780802027900.
- Thiervoz (1957). "Une curieuse figure de marin : le capitaine de vaisseau de Rossel de Cercy". Neptunia (47): 11–15.

External links

- Works by Auguste-Louis de Rossel de Cercy
