= French ship Aigle (1750) =

Ship of the line of the French Navy

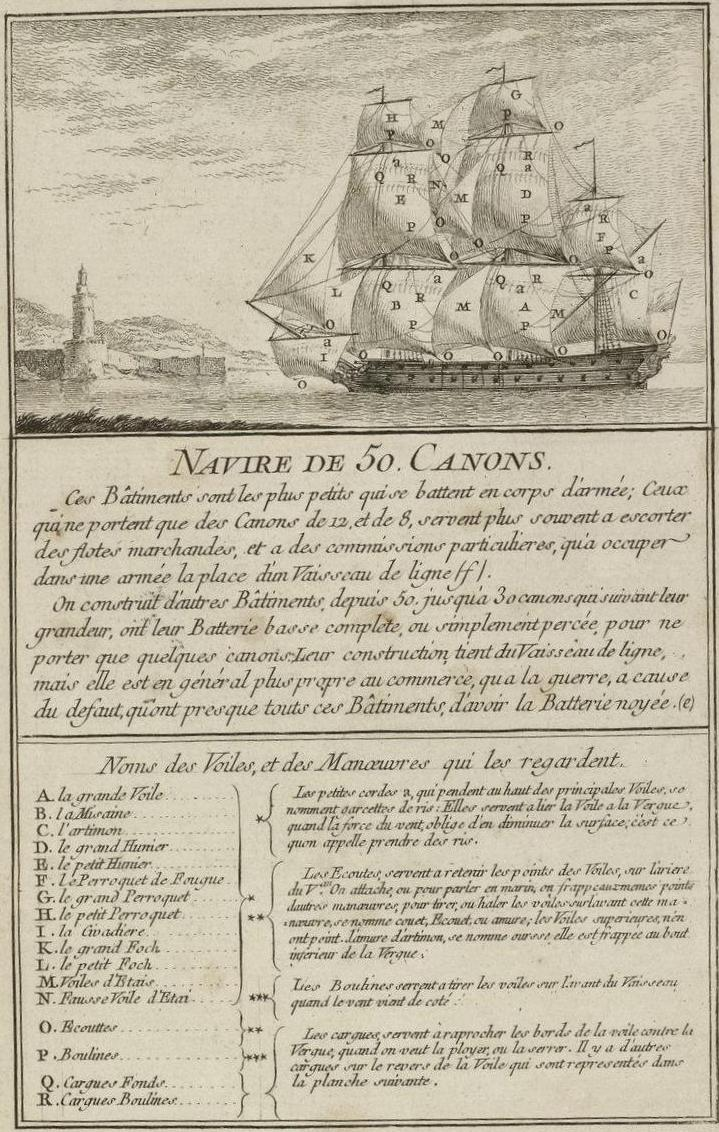
A 50-gun ship of a similar type to the Aigle.

Aigle was a 50-gun ship of the line of the French Navy. Built at Rochefort by P. Morineau between 1748 and 1751, she was launched in 1750.

The ship was wrecked and burnt in the Strait of Belle Isle in 1765.
