= HMS Vulture (1776) =

Sloop of the Royal Navy

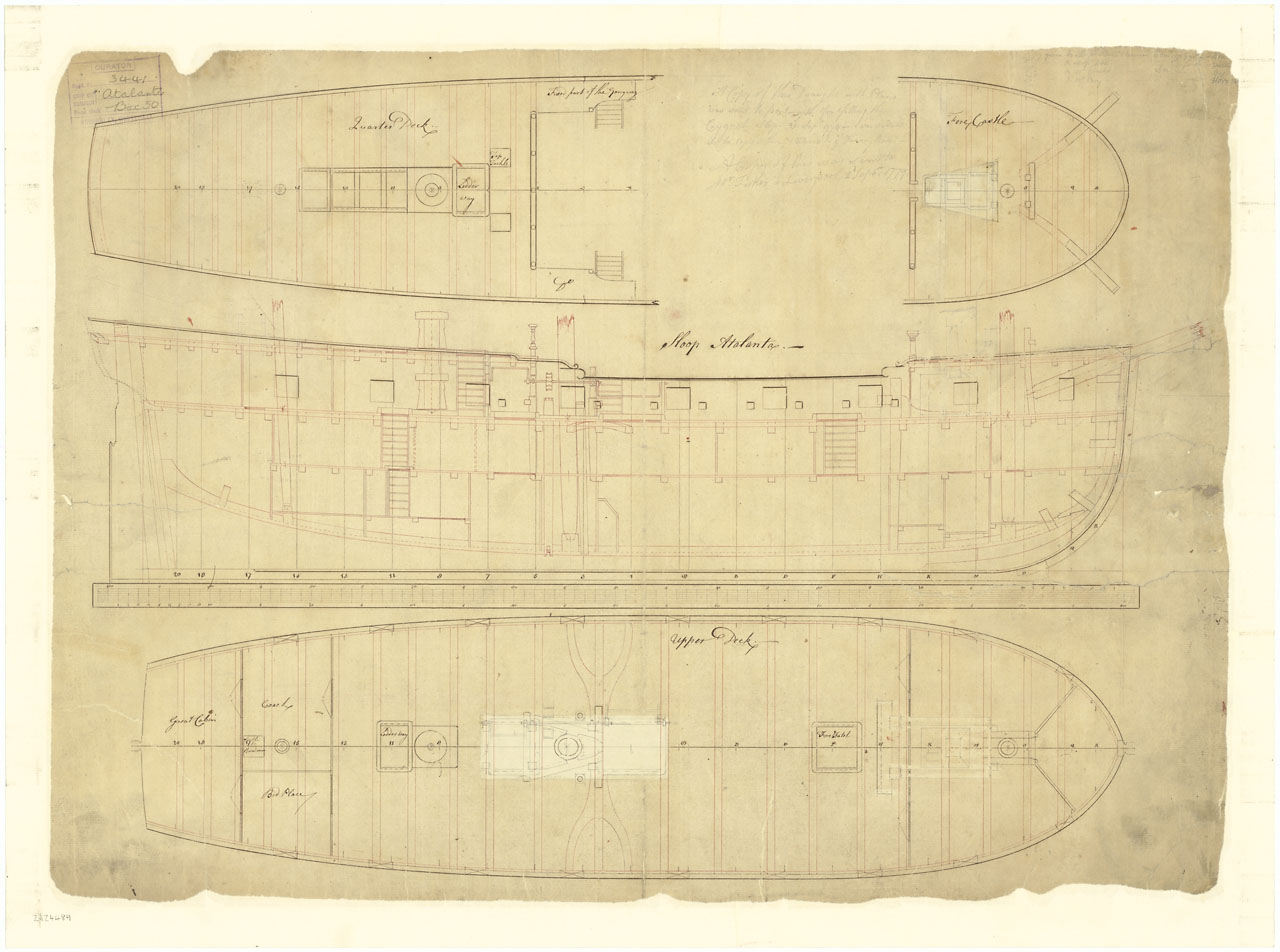
- Plans of the Vulture

History

Great Britain
- Name: HMS Vulture
- Ordered: 30 October 1775
- Builder: John and William Wells, Deptford
- Laid down: November 1775
- Launched: 18 March 1776
- Commissioned: April 1776
- Fate: Sold August 1802

General characteristics
- Class & type: Swan-class ship sloop
- Tons burthen: 30458/94 bm
- Length: 96 ft 9 1/2 in (29.5 m) (gundeck); 79 ft 2 in (24.1 m) (keel)
- Beam: 26 ft 10 3/4 in (8.2 m)
- Depth of hold: 12 ft 11 in (3.9 m)
- Complement: 125
- Armament: 14 × 6-pounder guns; 2 more added ca. 1780

HMS Vulture was a 14 to 16-gun ship sloop of the Swan class, launched for the Royal Navy on 18 March 1776. She served during both the American Revolutionary War and the French Revolutionary War, before the Navy sold her in 1802. Vulture is perhaps best known for being the warship to which Benedict Arnold fled on the Hudson River in 1780 after unsuccessfully trying to surrender the Continental Army fort at West Point, New York to the British.

== Career ==
Vulture was commissioned in April 1776 under Commander James Featios. She then sailed for North America on 9 September.

In May 1777, she captured Hannah in the Bay of Fundy. On 16 October 1777 she captured Polly in the River St. Johns.

On 5 May 1779, Vulture and Hope shared in the proceeds of the capture of General Gates. General Gates was a Massachusetts privateer brig or schooner of eight guns and 40 men, under the command of Captain William Carleton. Hope took General Gates into Halifax where she was condemned and sold.

On 29 May 1779, Vulture was part of Admiral George Collier's small flotilla that sailed up the Hudson River and captured Stony Point, two months later the site of the American victory in the Battle of Stony Point. After dark, Collier sent Vulture and the galley Cornwallis further up the river past Fort Lafayette to prevent the Americans from escaping by water, in which task the British were successful.

Vulture shared with Iris, Galatea, and Delight in the proceeds from the capture on 21 April 1780 of the American privateer General Reed. Vulture's captain at the time was Andrew Sutherland. General Reed was a Philadelphia brig armed with 16 guns, with a crew of 120 men under the command of Samuel Davidson.

The highpoint of Vulture's career occurred in the action of 21 July 1781. Vulture was one of three Royal Navy ships and two armed vessels escorting a convoy of 13 unarmed merchant vessels carrying coal. The escorts comprised frigate Charlestown, the two sloops Vulture and Allegiance, the armed transport Vernon, and Jack, another small armed ship. Vernon was carrying troops from the 70th Regiment of Foot, who were to work in the coal mines.

Two French frigates Astrée (38), commanded by La Pérouse, and Hermione (34), commanded by Latouche Tréville, attacked the convoy. The French severely damaged Charlestown, which lost her mainmast and a number of her officers, including Captain Francis Evans. The French also significantly damaged Jack, which also lost her captain, and subsequently struck her colors. The engagement ended at nightfall. Captain Rupert George of Vulture led the damaged escorts into a safe harbor. Six French sailors were killed. Among the British, Captain Evans and seven sailors were killed, 14 were wounded on Charlestown. Vulture had one man killed and two wounded, and Vernon had six killed and seven wounded.

== Engagement at Teller's Point (1780) ==
Vulture is famously remembered as the warship upon which American traitor Benedict Arnold escaped. But it also brought British spy Major Andre to Haverstraw Bay and later abandoned him there due to an exchange of fire with two American soldiers, John "Jack" Peterson and Moses "George" Sherwood The engagement took place at a spot called Teller's Point, known today as Croton Point, on September 21 and 22. A plaque commemorating Vulture's battle with American rebels was erected in 1967 and reads "Commemorating the defense of Teller's Point by George Sherwood and Jack Peterson who repulsed the landing of British troops from the "Vulture" September 21, 1780, aiding in the capture of Major Andre."

== Other battles ==
Vulture and HMS Otter captured the brig Granada on 28 November 1781.

On 21 April 1782, Narcissus, Vulture, and Savage captured the Virginia privateer brig Grand Turk, of 12 guns and 75 men. Vulture was under the command of Lieutenant John Laugharne.

After her service on the North American Station, Vulture was paid off at Portsmouth in November 1783. At that time she received copper sheathing, but was laid up.

In May 1790, Lieutenant Timothy Bird commissioned Vulture as a storeship. Lieutenant Samuel Short recommissioned her as slop ship in April 1791, but she was not fitted for that role until December 1792. Lieutenant William Crosbe recommissioned her that month. In 1799 Lieutenant Jeffrey Gawen replaced Crosbe.

== Disposal ==
The Principal Officers and Commissioners of His Majesty's Navy offered the "Vulture, 304 Tons, laying at Portsmouth" for sale on 11 August 1802. She sold in August.
