= USS Boston (1777) =

30-gun frigate of the Continental Navy

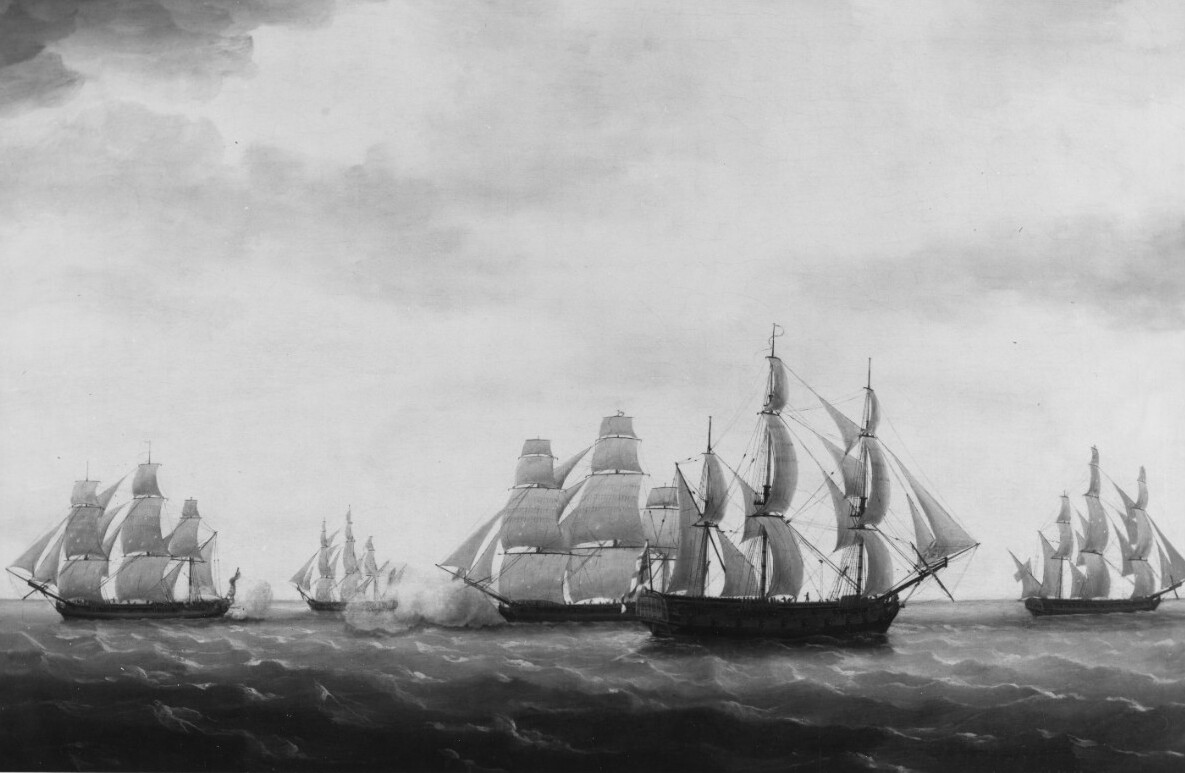
- Boston (first from right) on 8 July 1777

History

United States
- Name: Boston
- Namesake: Boston, Massachusetts
- Builder: Stephen and Ralph Cross, Newburyport, Massachusetts
- Launched: 3 June 1776
- Fate: Captured 12 May 1780

Great Britain
- Name: HMS Charlestown
- Acquired: 12 May 1780 by capture
- Fate: Sold 1783

General characteristics
- Type: Frigate
- Tonnage: 514
- Length: 114 ft 3 in (34.8 m) (overall); 94 ft 3 in (28.7 m) (keel)
- Beam: 32 ft (9.8 m)
- Depth of hold: 10 ft 3 in (3.1 m)
- Propulsion: Sail
- Speed: 8.5 knots (15.7 km/h; 9.8 mph)
- Armament: American service: 5 × 12 pdr (5.4 kg) guns; 19 × 9 pdr (4.1 kg) guns; 2 × 6 pdr (2.7 kg) guns; 4 × 4 pdr (1.8 kg) guns; British service: 28 guns; 6 × 18 pdr (8.2 kg) carronades

USS Boston was a 30-gun frigate of the Continental Navy. She was launched on June 3, 1776 by Stephen and Ralph Cross at Newburyport, Massachusetts and completed the following year. In American service she captured several British vessels. The British captured Boston during the siege of Charleston and took her into service as HMS Charlestown. She was engaged in one major fight with two French frigates, which she survived and which saved the convoy she was protecting. The British sold Charlestown in 1783, immediately after the end of the war.

== American service ==
Boston was commissioned under the command of Captain Hector McNeill. On 21 May 1777, Boston sailed in company with USS Hancock and the Massachusetts privateer American Tartar for a cruise in the North Atlantic. American Tartar parted from the two frigates shortly thereafter.

The two frigates captured three prizes including the 28-gun frigate HMS Fox (7 June). On 7–8 July, Boston, Hancock, and Fox engaged the British vessels HMS Flora, HMS Rainbow, and HMS Victor. The British captured Hancock and Fox, but Boston escaped to the Sheepscot River on the Maine coast. McNeill was court-martialed in June 1779 for his failure to support Hancock and was dismissed from the Navy.

During the period 15 February-31 March 1778, Boston, now under the command of Samuel Tucker, carried John Adams to France, capturing on 11 March the British letter of marque Martha (43°30′N 17°40′W), which the British later recaptured. She then cruised in European waters taking four prizes before returning to Portsmouth, New Hampshire, 15 October. On 5 May 1778 a Midshipman, Peter Cavee, fell overboard and drowned in port at Bordeaux, France. In 1779 she made two cruises (29 July – 6 September and 23 November – 23 December) in the North Atlantic capturing at least nine prizes. Boston then joined the squadron sent to assist in the defense of Charleston, South Carolina. There the British captured her when the town surrendered on 12 May 1780.

== British service ==
The British took Boston into service as HMS Charlestown. In June 1781 Admiral Mariot Arbuthnot sent Charlestown and several other vessels to attempt to block some French reinforcements from entering Boston. On 7 July, the squadron that Arbuthnot sent to Boston recaptured the British sloop-of-war HMS Atalanta, which the American frigate USS Alliance had captured on 27 May. Charlestown, under Captain Henry Francis Evans, and HMS Vulture, brought Atalanta into Halifax. Then Charlestown sent in two American privateers that she had taken, Flying Fish and Yankee Hero.

Next, Charlestown took part in the action of 21 July 1781. She was one of five Royal Navy ships escorting a convoy of 13 colliers and merchant vessels. The escorts also included the two sloops-of-war Allegiance and Vulture, the armed transport Vernon, and Jack, another small armed merchant ship. The convoy was off the harbor of Spanish River, Cape Breton, Nova Scotia (present-day Sydney, Nova Scotia), or Île Royale, when it came under attack from two French frigates Astrée, commanded by La Pérouse, and Hermione, commanded by Latouche Tréville, resulting in the naval battle of Louisbourg. The French captured Jack. Charlestown struck to the French frigates but they were unable to take possession of her; French accounts state that she escaped in the dark. The French lost six men killed and 34 wounded; the British lost some 17 or so men killed and 48 wounded. Charlestown alone lost 8 men killed, including Evans, and 29 men wounded. The merchant vessels and their cargoes of coal entered Spanish River safely. Charlestown and the sloops sailed back to Halifax.

Lieutenant Rupert George of Vulture replaced Evans as captain of Charlestown. He was posted on 29 November 1781 and remained her captain.

== Fate ==
The Royal Navy sold Charlestown in 1783.

== See also ==
- List of sailing frigates of the United States Navy
- List of ships captured in the 18th century
- Bibliography of early American naval history
