= Paul Wentworth (counsellor) =

British Member of Parliament (died 1794)

Paul Wentworth (1728 or 1736–1794) was a lawyer and plantation owner in Surinam, a stockbroker in London, a British intelligence agent to Lord North during the American War of Independence, and a politician who sat in the House of Commons briefly. He was friendly with Arthur Lee, Silas Deane, Philip Skene and Benedict Arnold.

== Early life ==
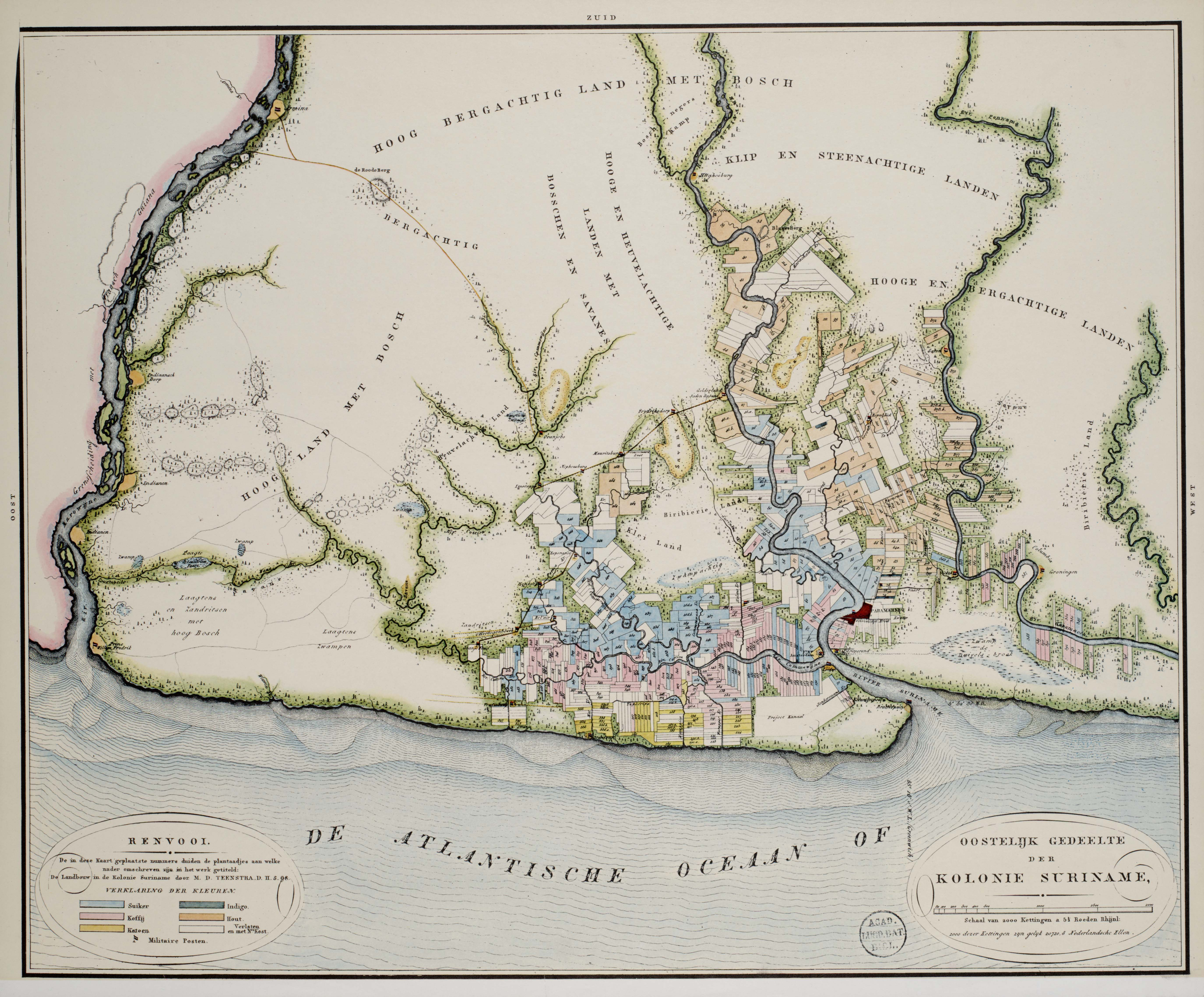
Map eastern part of the colony Surinam (1835) with "Klein Hoop" near the redoubt Leyden

Wentworth may have been born in Barbados or in New Hampshire. He moved to Portsmouth, New Hampshire in the 1750s, and won the patronage of the governor Benning Wentworth. He studied law (LL. D.) and in 1756 he married a rich widow in Surinam, where he worked at court of justice. In 1764 he hired the chemist Edward Bancroft to survey and improve his Surinam plantation. After he inherited a sugar and coffee plantation he left for London. He established himself as a stockbroker or speculator. In 1767 he resided at Spring Gardens and send a collection of butterflies from the Dutch colony of Surinam and a pastel by Francis Cotes to 2nd Marquess of Rockingham. In 1770 he resided in Amsterdam and tried to sell his late wife's property. His friend John Wentworth, the loyalist governor of New Hampshire appointed him in 1770 as a member of the New Hampshire council and also as the province's agent to the Parliament of Great Britain despite the two offices needing to be on opposite sides of the Atlantic.

== Counselling activities ==
Before open war between France and Britain, Pierre Beaumarchais was at the center of an arms traffic to support American Insurgents.

Wentworth lived at Poland Street and he invited Arthur Lee (diplomat) who lived there for five years. Wentworth gave Lee access to the highest reaches of the British government. In the weekend he visited Brandenburgh House in Hammersmith, owned by Thomas Wyndham. In 1771 George Colebrooke and James Cockburn, directors of the EIC, recruited Wentworth to borrow £66,000 from Hope & Co.

Wentworth decided that the British crown offered better opportunities than the Americans. He started supplying information to the British secret service in 1772 or 1774. Sir William Eden, head of the British secret service, granted Wentworth a pension of 500 pounds a year for his services. He corresponded with Henry Hope in 1775. Wentworth was to spy on the American delegation to the French court when Silas Deane was sent to Paris in 1776. (See France in the American Revolutionary War) Deane and Benjamin Franklin were both old friends of Wentworth and he could easily make the necessary contacts. Wentworth arranged for Bancroft to meet Secret Service chief William Eden and Lords Suffolk and Weymouth, where Bancroft agreed to become a spy for Britain. Bancroft joined the American mission in Paris in December 1776. In 1777 Pierre Beaumarchais wrote to Vergennes that Wentworth spoke French "like you and better than I do: he is one of the cleverest men in England". He gave details about the brig Andrew Doria, when he resided in Amsterdam. In 1778 Wentworth was in discussions with Franklin on peace terms but the effect of this was to help drive the French into alliance with the Americans.

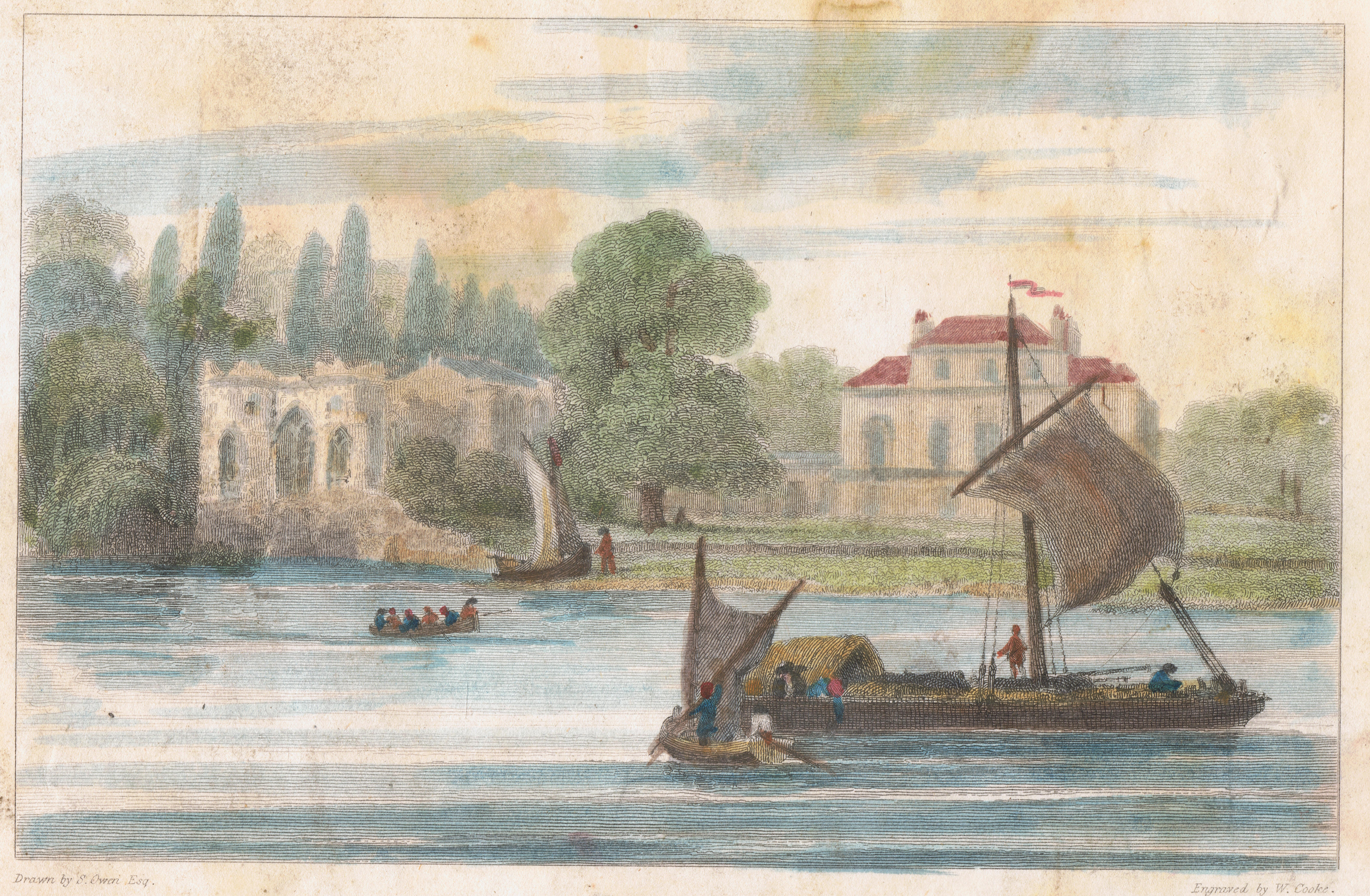
The Brandenburg House, a splendid mansion in Dutch style, made out of bricks, overlooking the Thames; drawn by S. Owen, engraved by W. Cooke (1809).

Wentworth was a friend of Lord Suffolk, promised a baronetcy, a place at the Treasury, and a seat in Parliament if he performed well. He built up and controlled a spy network and provided military intelligence to the British government on the basis of the reports he gathered. The British government knew that Lee and Beaumarchais were plotting to smuggle French aid to the Americans even before Versailles or Philadelphia knew. Lord North considered him "the most important and truest informer" although King George III had little confidence in his reports and disliked his speculative activities.

== Political career ==
Wentworth returned as Member of Parliament for Saltash with administration support, at a by-election on 12 July 1780. However the dissolution of Parliament was announced before he could take his seat. At the 1780 general election in September he stood at Penryn, also in Cornwall, as Government candidate, but came last in the poll. Joachim Rendorp secretly involved him as mediator in the Fourth Anglo-Dutch War. In 1783 he was visited by John Wheelock when Dartmouth College was on the verge of financial collapse and promised an atlas and a large pair of globes.

== Later life and legacy ==
Wentworth still owned Klein Hoop, a sugar plantation (500 acres and 130 slaves) on the north bank of the Cottica River in Surinam. In 1784 John Wentworth sent 19 slaves from Nova Scotia. According to his secret will he went there with Nathaniel Paul Wentworth (1770-) and his mistress after October 1790. He promised the poet Sarah Wentworth Apthorp Morton in Braintree and her daughter money. He died on 26 January 1794. His medium-sized plantations Klein Hoop, L'Assistance (Commewijne River) and a brickyard Appecappe were passed on to three relatives.

== See also ==
- Jean-Charles-Pierre Lenoir

Parliament of Great Britain
Preceded by Grey Cooper; Henry Strachey	Member of Parliament for Saltash; 1780–1780; With: Grey Cooper	Succeeded by Grey Cooper; Charles Jenkinson
