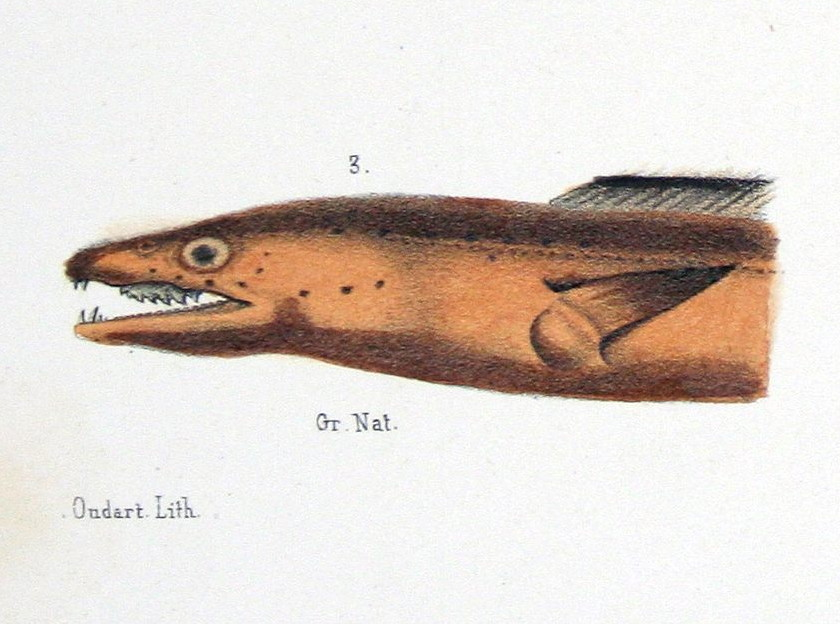

Conservation status
- Least Concern (IUCN 3.1)

Scientific classification
- Kingdom: Animalia
- Phylum: Chordata
- Class: Actinopterygii
- Order: Anguilliformes
- Family: Muraenesocidae
- Genus: Cynoponticus
- Species: C. savanna

Binomial name
- Cynoponticus savanna (Bancroft, 1831)

Synonyms
- Conger savanna Bancroft, 1831; Muraenesox savanna (Bancroft, 1831)

= Cynoponticus savanna =

Species of fish

Cynoponticus savanna,, the Guayana pike-conger, pike-headed eel or sapphire eel, is an eel in the family Muraenesocidae (pike congers). It was described by Edward Nathaniel Bancroft in 1831, originally under the genus Conger. It is a marine, tropical eel which is known from the western Atlantic Ocean, including Central America, the Caribbean and Brazil. It dwells at a maximum depth of 100 metres (330 ft), and inhabits muddy substrates in bays and estuaries. Males can reach a maximum total length of 150 centimetres (59 in), but more commonly reach a TL of 50 centimetres (20 in).

The Guayana pike-conger's diet consists of zoobenthos. It is of minor commercial use to fisheries, and is marketed fresh.
