= Cynoponticus ferox =

Conservation status
- Least Concern (IUCN 3.1)

Scientific classification
- Kingdom: Animalia
- Phylum: Chordata
- Class: Actinopterygii
- Division: Teleostei
- Order: Anguilliformes
- Family: Muraenesocidae
- Genus: Cynoponticus
- Species: C. ferox

Binomial name
- Cynoponticus ferox Costa, 1846

Synonyms
- Muraenesox ferox (Costa, 1846); Phyllogramma regani Pellegrin, 1934

Species of fish

Cynoponticus ferox, the Guinean pike conger, is an eel in the family Muraenesocidae (pike congers). It was described by Oronzio Gabriele Costa in 1846. It is a marine, subtropical eel which is known from the eastern Atlantic Ocean, including Gibraltar, the western Mediterranean, and Angola. It dwells at a depth range of 10 to 100 metres (33 to 328 ft); larger individuals are usually found from 75 to 100 metres (246 to 328 ft). It inhabits sand and mud substrates on the continental shelf. Males can reach a maximum total length of 200 centimetres (79 in), but more commonly reach a TL of 150 centimetres (59 in).

The Guinean pike conger's diet consists of finfish, mollusks, and shrimp such as Penaeus notialis. It is of commercial use to fisheries.
