= Samuel Owen =

Samuel Owen may refer to:

- Samuel Owen (engineer) (1774–1854), British-Swedish engineer
- Samuel Owen (artist) (1769–1857), English marine painter
- Satō (佐藤 Satou, born Samuel T. Owen), fictional Japanese terrorist
