= The Rivers of England =

Series of paintings by J.M.W. Turner

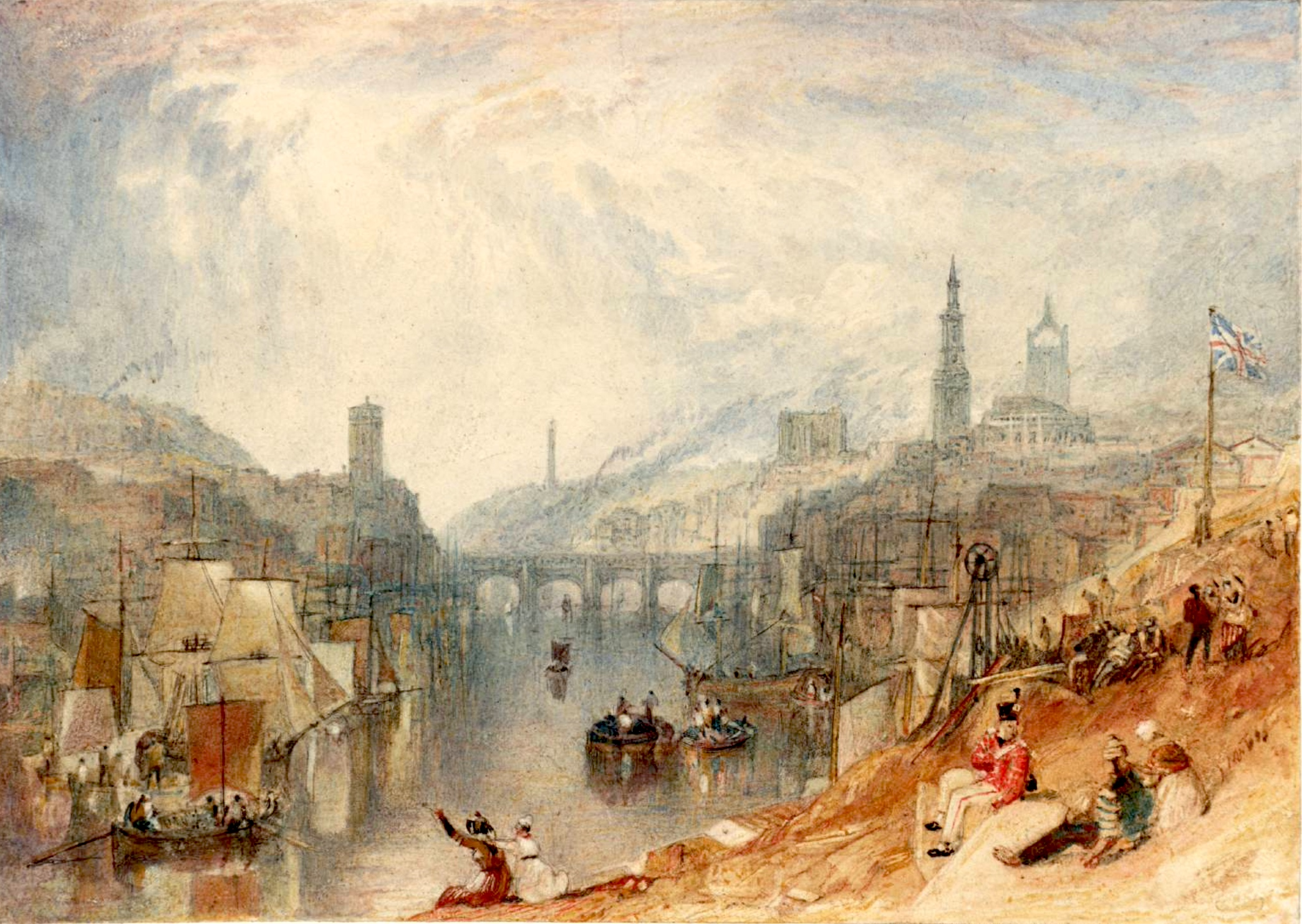
Newcastle-on-Tyne, 1823

The Rivers of England is a series of watercolour paintings by the British artist J.M.W. Turner produced between 1822 and 1824. The seventeen works were commissioned by the engraver William Bernard Cooke who published a series of mezzotints based on them.

Of the twenty one mezzotints Cooke eventually published, sixteen were based on Turner, one from William Collins (Eton on the Thames) and four on the watercolours by Thomas Girtin a friend of Turner who had died two decades earlier.

The original Turner watercolours are now in the collection of the Tate Britain in Pimlico, having been part of the Turner Bequest of 1851.

== Gallery ==
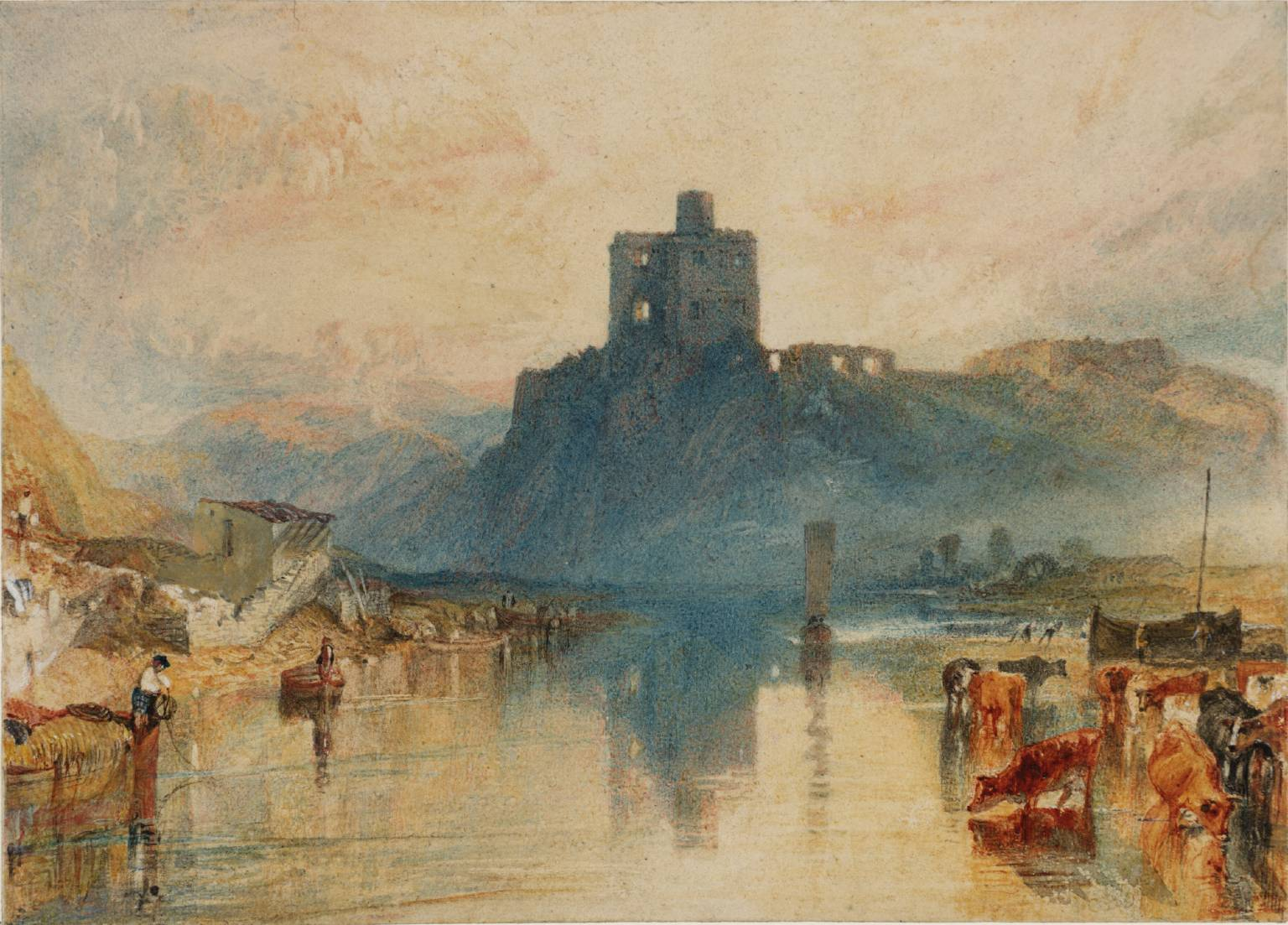
Norham Castle, on the River Tweed

Stangate Creek, on the River Medway

Totnes, on the River Dart

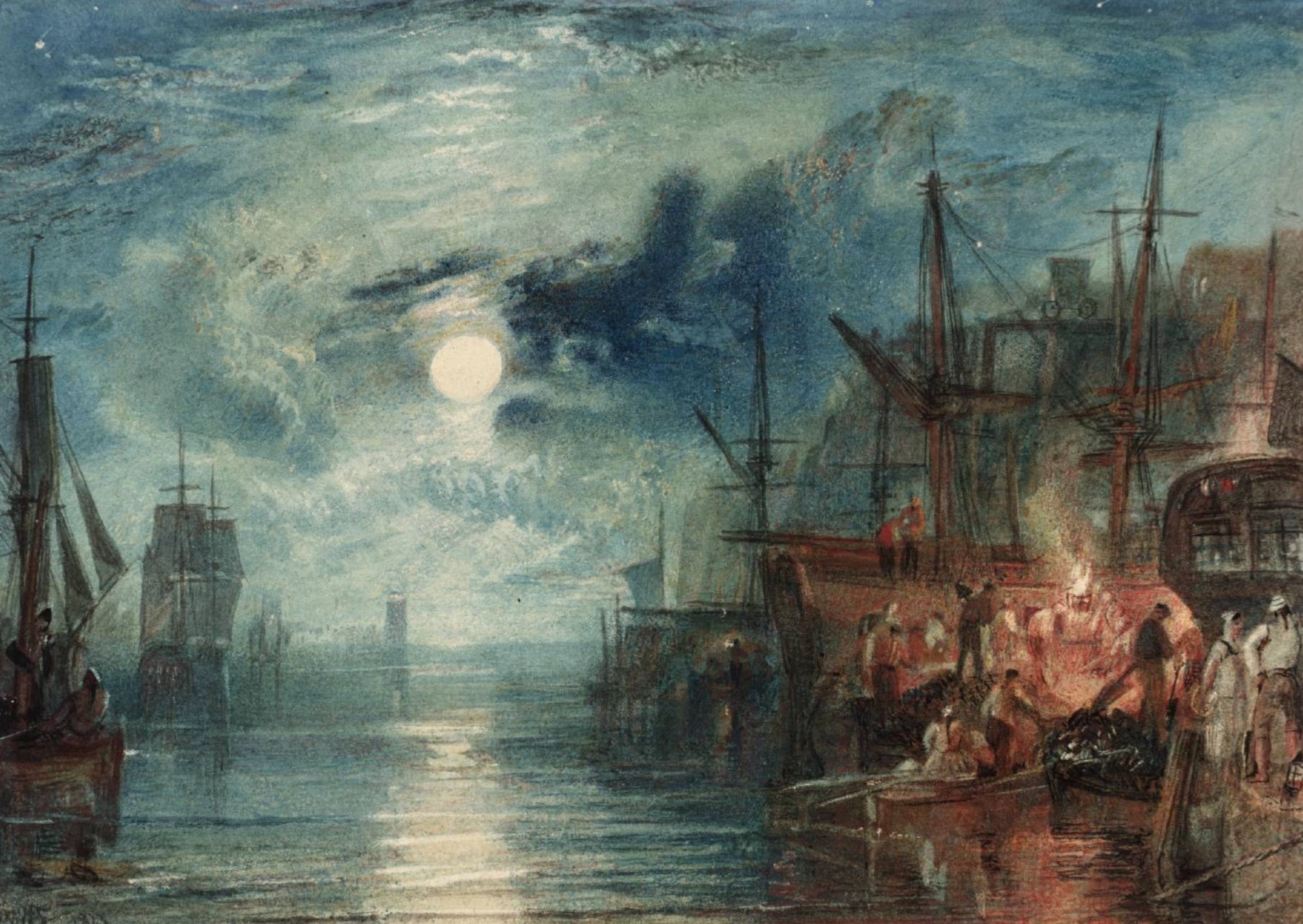
Shields, on the River Tyne

Rochester, on the River Medway

The Mouth of the River Humber

== See also ==
- List of paintings by J. M. W. Turner

== Bibliography ==
- Bailey, Anthony. J.M.W. Turner: Standing in the Sun. Tate Enterprises, 2013.
- Shanes, Eric. Turner's England. Trafalgar Square Publishing, 2011.
