= The Battle of Navarino =

Painting by George Philip Reinagle

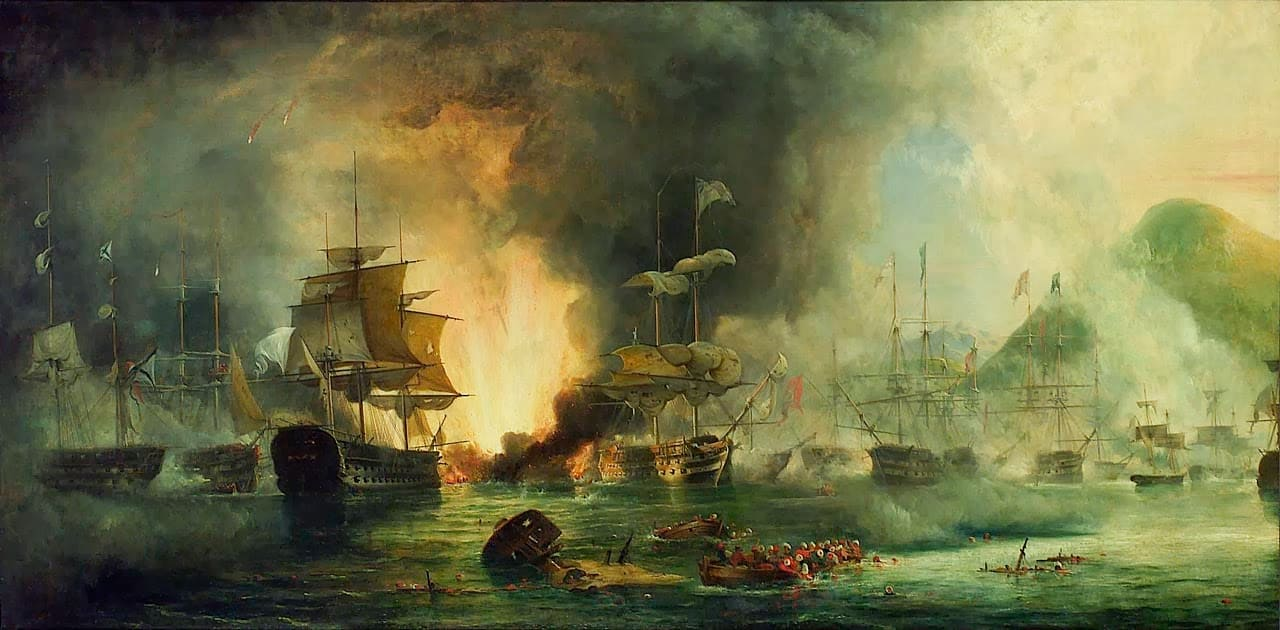
- Artist: George Philip Reinagle
- Year: 1828
- Medium: Oil on canvas
- Dimensions: 121.9 cm × 243.8 cm (48.0 in × 96.0 in)
- Location: National Maritime Museum, London

The Battle of Navarino is an 1828 oil painting by the British artist George Philip Reinagle. A seascape, it depicts the naval Battle of Navarino fought on 20 October 1827 at during the Greek War of Independence. The battle took place off the coast of the Peloponnese when a combined force of British, French and Russian ships under the Royal Navy Admiral Edward Codrington defeated the fleet of the Ottoman Empire.

The event was celebrated in Britain and Coddington became a public hero. Reinagle was the youngest son of the artist Ramsay Richard Reinagle, and became known for his seascapes. He witnessed the battle from the deck of HMS Mosquito and on his return to England published lithographs based on the campaign as well as several paintings.

The work was displayed at the Royal Academy Exhibition of 1829 at Somerset House. Today it is in the collection of the National Maritime Museum in Greenwich.

== See also ==
- Portrait of Edward Codrington, an 1828 portrait by Thomas Lawrence

== Bibliography ==
- Mazower, Mark. The Greek Revolution: 1821 and the Making of Modern Europe. Penguin Books, 2021.
- Tracy, Nicholas. Britannia's Palette: The Arts of Naval Victory. McGill-Queen's Press, 2007.
- Woodhouse, Christopher Montague. The Battle of Navarino. Hoddler and Stoughton, 1975.
