= Portrait of John Constable =

Painting by Ramsay Richard Reinagle

- Artist: Ramsay Richard Reinagle
- Year: 1799
- Type: Oil on canvas, portrait painting
- Dimensions: 76.2 cm × 63.8 cm (30.0 in × 25.1 in)
- Location: National Portrait Gallery; London

Portrait of John Constable' is a 1799 portrait painting by the English artist Ramsay Richard Reinagle. It depicts his friend and fellow painter John Constable at the age of around twenty three.

The two men were both students at the Royal Academy at the time. They each painted each other's portraits, both pictures focusing on the romantic air they were cultivating. Reinagle was the son of the painter Philip Reinagle while Constable's family owned Flatford Mill. Producing views of "Constable Country'" in his native Suffolk, Constable would go on to become one of Britain's most celebrated landscape painters. Today the painting is in the collection of the National Portrait Gallery in London, having been given by the Art Fund in 1917.

== Bibliography ==
- Gayford, Martin & Lyles, Anne. Constable Portraits: The Painter and His Circle. National Portrait Gallery, 2009.
- Hamilton, James. Constable: A Portrait. Hachette UK, 2022.
- Reynolds, Graham. Constable's England. Metropolitan Museum of Art, 1983.
