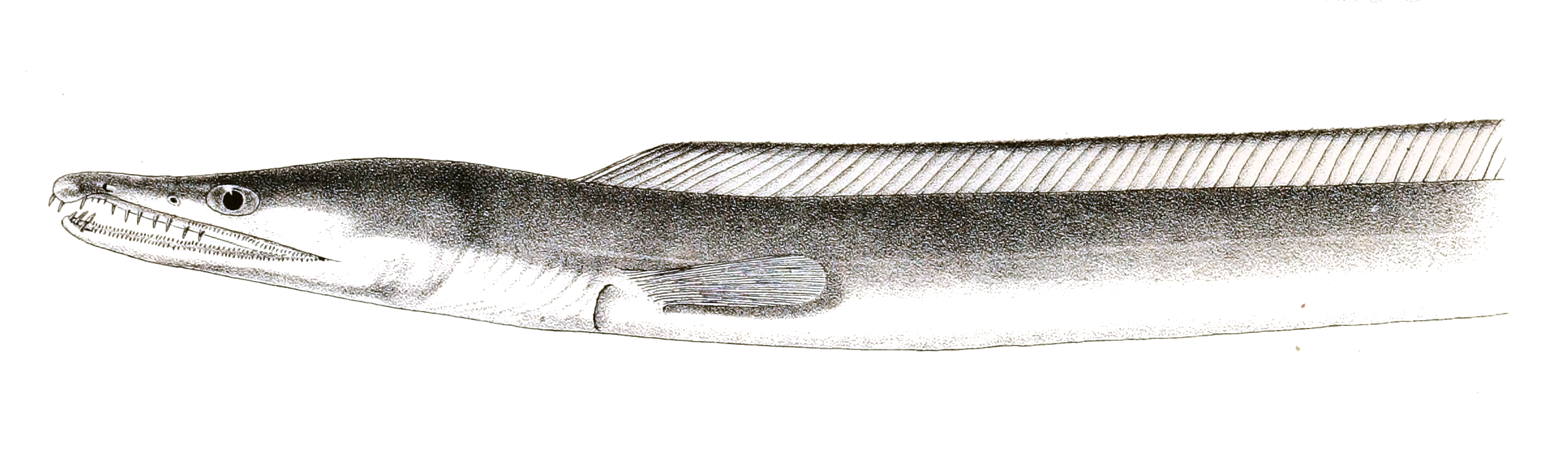

Conservation status
- Least Concern (IUCN 3.1)

Scientific classification
- Kingdom: Animalia
- Phylum: Chordata
- Class: Actinopterygii
- Order: Anguilliformes
- Family: Muraenesocidae
- Genus: Congresox
- Species: C. talabon

Binomial name
- Congresox talabon (Cuvier, 1829)

Synonyms
- Conger talabon Cuvier, 1829; Muraenesox talabon (Cuvier, 1829); Muraenesox exodentata McClelland, 1844; Muraenesox exodon McClelland, 1843; Muraenesox serradentata McClelland, 1843

= Yellow pike conger =

Species of fish

The yellow pike conger (Congresox talabon) is a species of marine ray-finned fish belonging to the family Muraenesocidae, the pike congers. This fish is found in the Indian Ocean and the western Pacific Ocean.

== Taxonomy ==
The yellow pike conger was first formally described as Conger talabon in 1829 by the French naturalist, zoologist and paleontologist Georges Cuvier with its type locality given as Vizagapatnam in India. In 1890 Theodore Gill proposed the monospecific genus Congresox and designated C. talabon as its type species. The genus Cogresox is classified within the family Muraenesocidae in the suborder Congroidei of the order Anguilliformes, the eels.

== Etymology ==
The yellow pike conger is in the genus Congresox, a name which combines Conger, i.e. the conger eel, with esox, a name based on a Gaulish word for a large fish of the River Rhine, probably the Atlantic salmon, but now used for the pikes. The specific name, talabon, is derived from tala bon, a Telugu word for an eel, this name was reported by Patrick Russell in his Descriptions and figures of two hundred fishes; collected at Vizagapatam on the coast of Coromandel published in 1803. Cuvier misspelt the name as talabou, but the correct spelling is in prevailing use.

== Description ==
The yellow pike conger is an eel with a large mouth with the upper jaw extending beyond the eye. The pectoral fin has a length that is around a third of the length of the head. There are 41 or 42 lateral line pores in front of the anus, there are also between 70 and 75 rays of the dorsal fin in front of the anus. The dorsal fin has its origins in from of the gill openings. This species has a maximum published total length of 80 cm (31 in), although 50 cm (20 in).

== Distribution and habitat ==
The yellow pike conger is found in the Indian Ocean the Arabian Sea east into the Western Pacific Ocean as far as the South China Sea and it occurs at depths between 0 and 100 m (0 and 328 ft) in river mouths and estuaries, as well as coastal waters, over soft muddy or sandy substrates.

== Biology ==
The yellow pike conger is a demersal carnivore feeding on fishes and crustaceans at night.

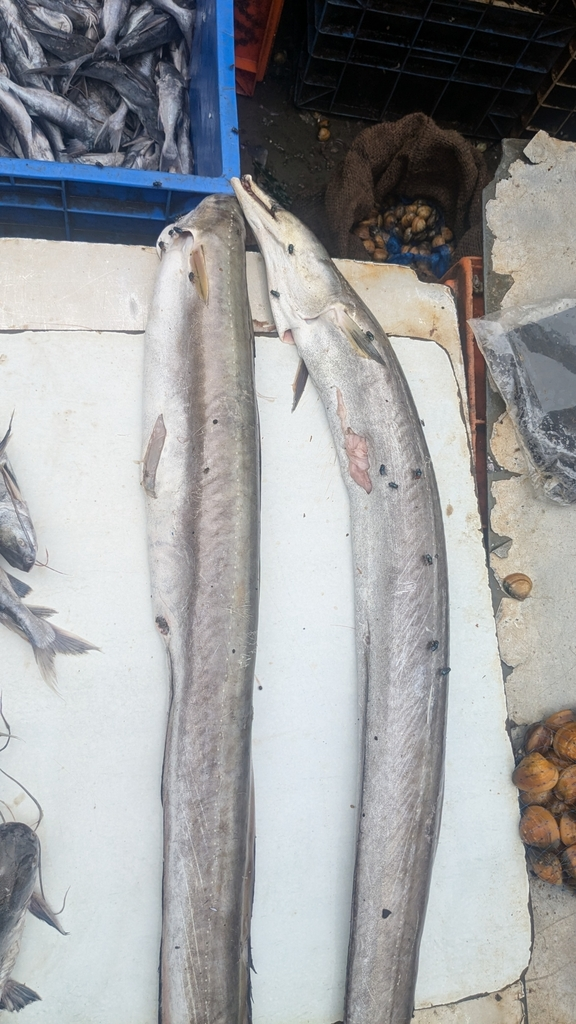
Mumbai

== Fisheries ==
The yellow pike conger is targeted by artisanal and subsistence fisheries, fished for at night by trawling, longlining and drift netting and is largely sold fresh in fish markets, especially in Indonesia. It is also caught for the ornamental fish trade in India.
