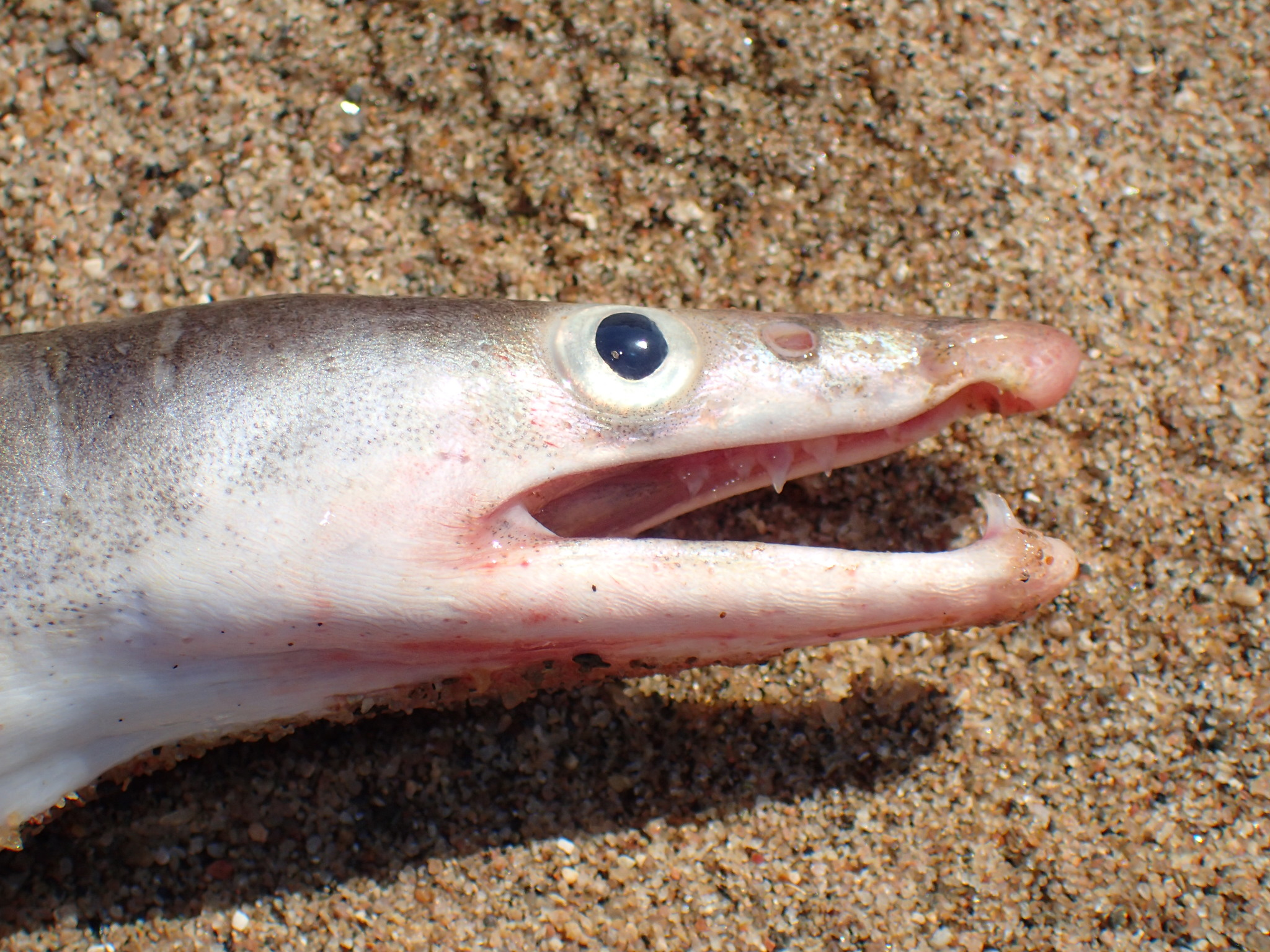
- Detail of head

Conservation status
- Least Concern (IUCN 3.1)

Scientific classification
- Kingdom: Animalia
- Phylum: Chordata
- Class: Actinopterygii
- Order: Anguilliformes
- Family: Muraenesocidae
- Genus: Muraenesox
- Species: M. bagio

Binomial name
- Muraenesox bagio (F. Hamilton, 1822)

Synonyms
- Muraena bagio

= Common pike conger =

Species of fish

Conger Eel
Nutritional value per 100 g (3.5 oz)
- Energy: 288 kcal (1,200 kJ)
- Carbohydrates: 0 g
- Fat: 5.3 g
- Polyunsaturated omega−3: ~0.5 g
- Protein: 22.3 g
- ^{†}Percentages estimated using US recommendations for adults. Source: https://slism.com/calorie/110231/

The common pike conger or pike eel (Muraenesox bagio) is a species of eel found throughout most of the Indo-Pacific. In Australia, it is known in the southwest, in Western Australia, around the tropical north of the country, and south to the coast of New South Wales. The common pike conger grows up to 2 m (6 ft 7 in) in length and 7.1 kg (16 lb) in weight. A nocturnal predator, the common pike conger lives in estuaries and near the shore to a depth of 100 m (330 ft). A strong and muscular fish, the common pike conger is a delicacy in South East Asia and features in various dishes.

== Breeding ==
In Australia, the females lay the eggs off the coasts; the eggs take 9–10 weeks to hatch. A female can lay up to four million eggs in a single year.

== Nutrition ==
Pike conger is a nutrient-dense seafood, rich in protein, omega-3 fatty acids, and vitamins A, D, and B12. It supports cardiovascular health, neural development, and bone strength. Its low mercury content makes it a safer choice for frequent consumption compared to predatory fish.
