= Conehead =

Conehead or cone head may refer to:

== Animals ==
- Conocephalinae, a subfamily of insects, especially:
  - Conocephalus, a genus of insects
  - Neoconocephalus, a genus of insects
  - Ruspolia, a genus of insects
- Protura, an order of soil-dwelling arthropods
- Conehead mantis, Empusa pennata
- Conehead eel, Cynoponticus coniceps
- The head shape of a human infant

== Film and TV ==
- Coneheads, a Saturday Night Live sketch comedy series
- Coneheads (film), a 1993 film based on the SNL sketch

== Music ==
- "Conehead", a song from the 1981 Frank Zappa album You Are What You Is
