= Man-of-war =

Historic Royal Naval term for a warship

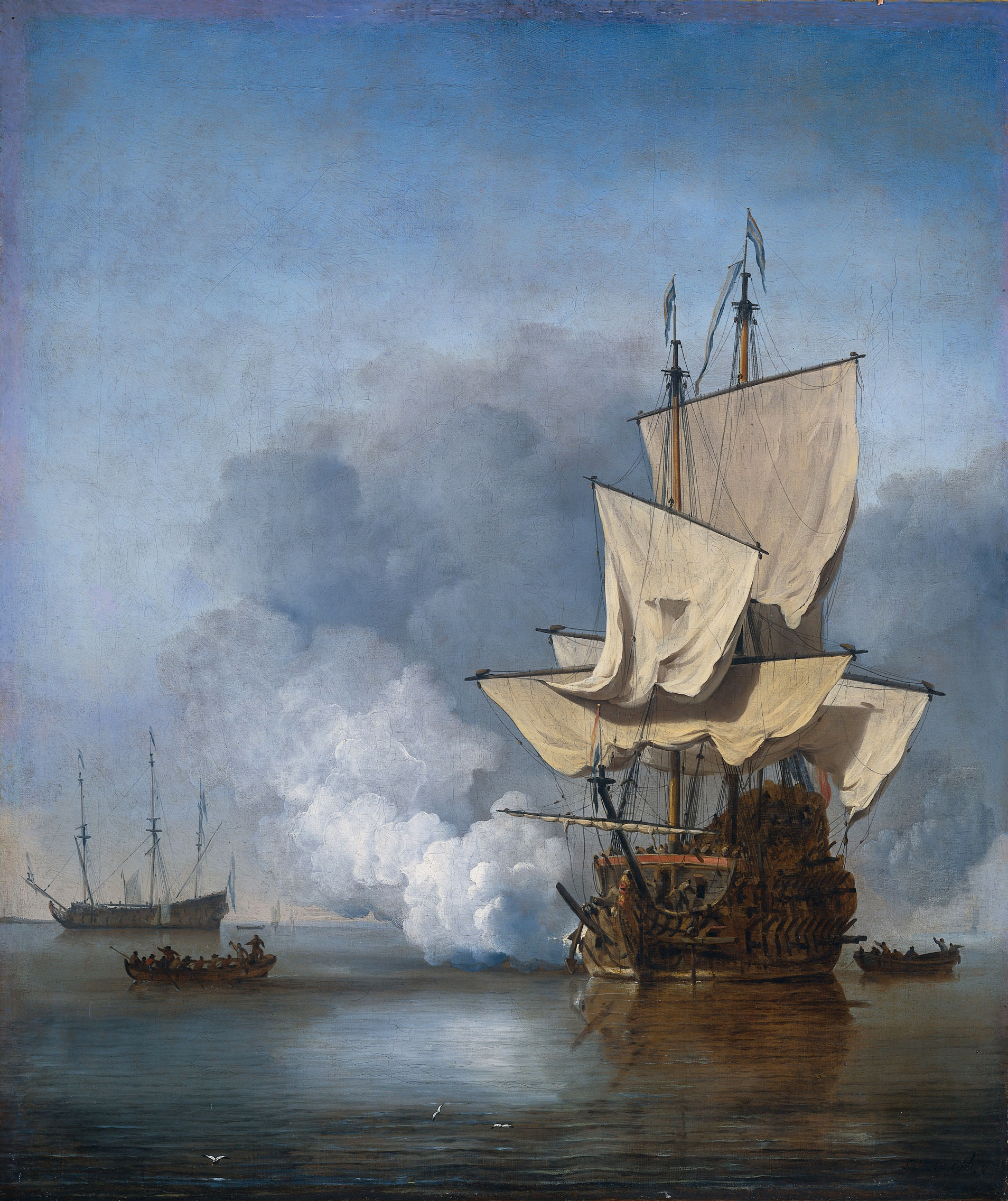
A Dutch man-of-war firing a salute. The Cannon Shot, painting by Willem van de Velde the Younger.

In Royal Navy jargon, a man-of-war (also man-o'-war, or simply man) was a powerful warship or frigate which was frequently used in Europe from the 16th to the 19th century. Although the term never acquired a specific meaning, it was usually reserved for a sailing ship armed with cannons. The rating system of the Royal Navy classified men-of-war into six "rates", a "first-rate" having the greatest armament, and a "sixth-rate" the least.

== Description ==
The man-of-war was developed in Portugal in the early 15th century from earlier roundships with the addition of a second mast to form the carrack. The 16th century saw the carrack evolve into the galleon and then the ship of the line. The evolution of the term has been given thus:

man-of-war. "A phrase applied to a line of battle ship, contrary to the usual rule in the English language by which all ships are feminine. It probably arose in the following manner: 'Men of war' were heavily armed soldiers. A ship full of them would be called a 'man-of-war ship.' In process of time the word 'ship' was discarded as unnecessary and there remained the phrase 'a man-of-war.'" – Talbot.

— Henry Frederic Reddall, Fact, Fancy, and Fable, 1892, p. 340

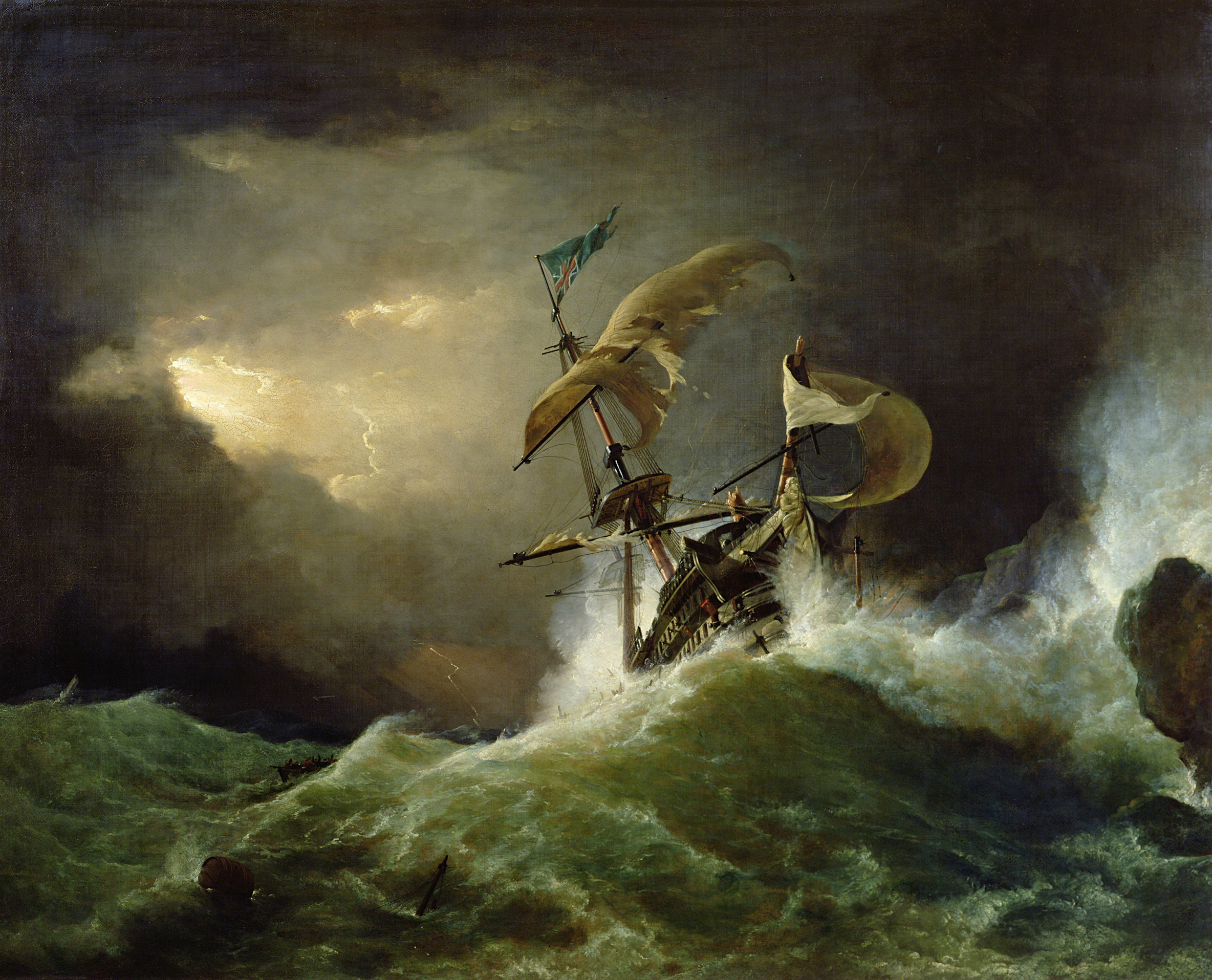
Man-of-war driving on a reef of rocks, and foundering in a gale, painting by George Philip Reinagle

The man-of-war design developed by Sir John Hawkins was a type of galleon which had three masts, each with three to four sails. The ship could be up to 60 metres long and could have up to 124 guns: four at the bow, eight at the stern, and 56 in each broadside. All these cannons required three gun decks to hold them, one more than any earlier ship. It had a maximum sailing speed of eight or nine knots.
