= Robert Souper Howard =

Robert Souper
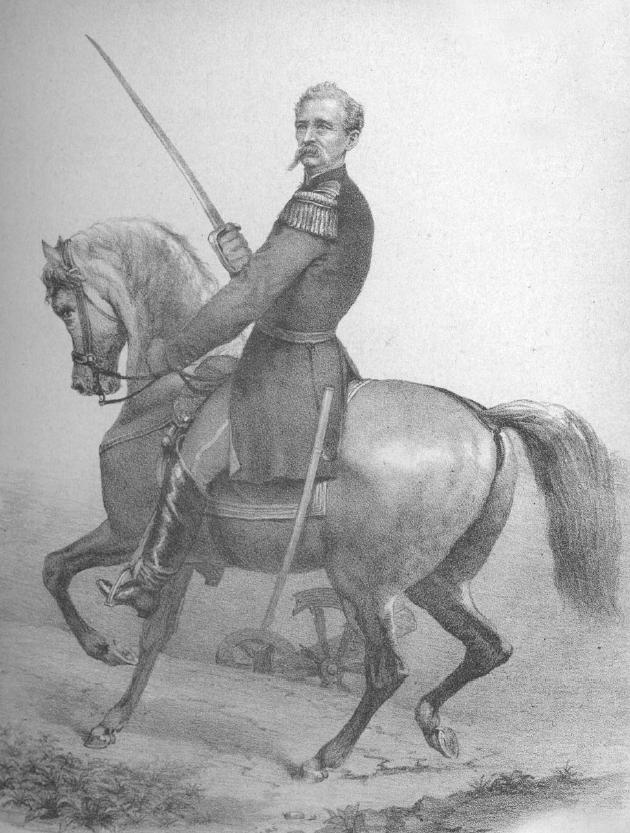
- Born: September 9, 1818; Harwich, England
- Died: January 13, 1881 (aged 62); Tacna, Peru

Colonel Robert Souper Howard (September 9, 1818 – January 13, 1881) was a Chilean soldier, although born in England, who served in the Chilean Army during most of the War of the Pacific.

== Early life ==
He was born in Harwich, England, the son of William Henry Souper, an army officer on half pay; Philip Dottin Souper was an elder brother. Souper had married Amelia Ann Reinagle (born 1777), daughter of Philip Reinagle the painter, in 1797.

The family later moved across the English Channel, for financial reasons, establishing themselves in Saint-Omer, and then Ghent.

== Role in the War of the Pacific ==
Souper moved to Chile in 1843, to work on a hacienda. Subsequently, he purchased a place of his own, in Talca Province.

During the War of the Pacific, Souper joined the Chilean Army a few days before the official declaration of war, on April 3, 1879, as a captain. He was then selected by Minister Rafael Sotomayor, and was present in the Naval Battle of Angamos.

He became a member of the Army General Staff, and participated in the Battle of Pisagua (November 2, 1879) and the Battle of Dolores (November 19, 1879); helping capture the Peruvian province of Tarapacá, which was effectively separated from the rest of the country.

During the Chilean offensive against Tarapacá, he served under General Manuel Baquedano as his Aide de Camp. Under his command, he fought on the Battle of Los Ángeles, the Battle of Alto de la Alianza and the assault of Arica.

He was killed during the aftermath of the Battle of San Juan and Chorrillos in 1881.
