= George Cooke (engraver) =

English line engraver

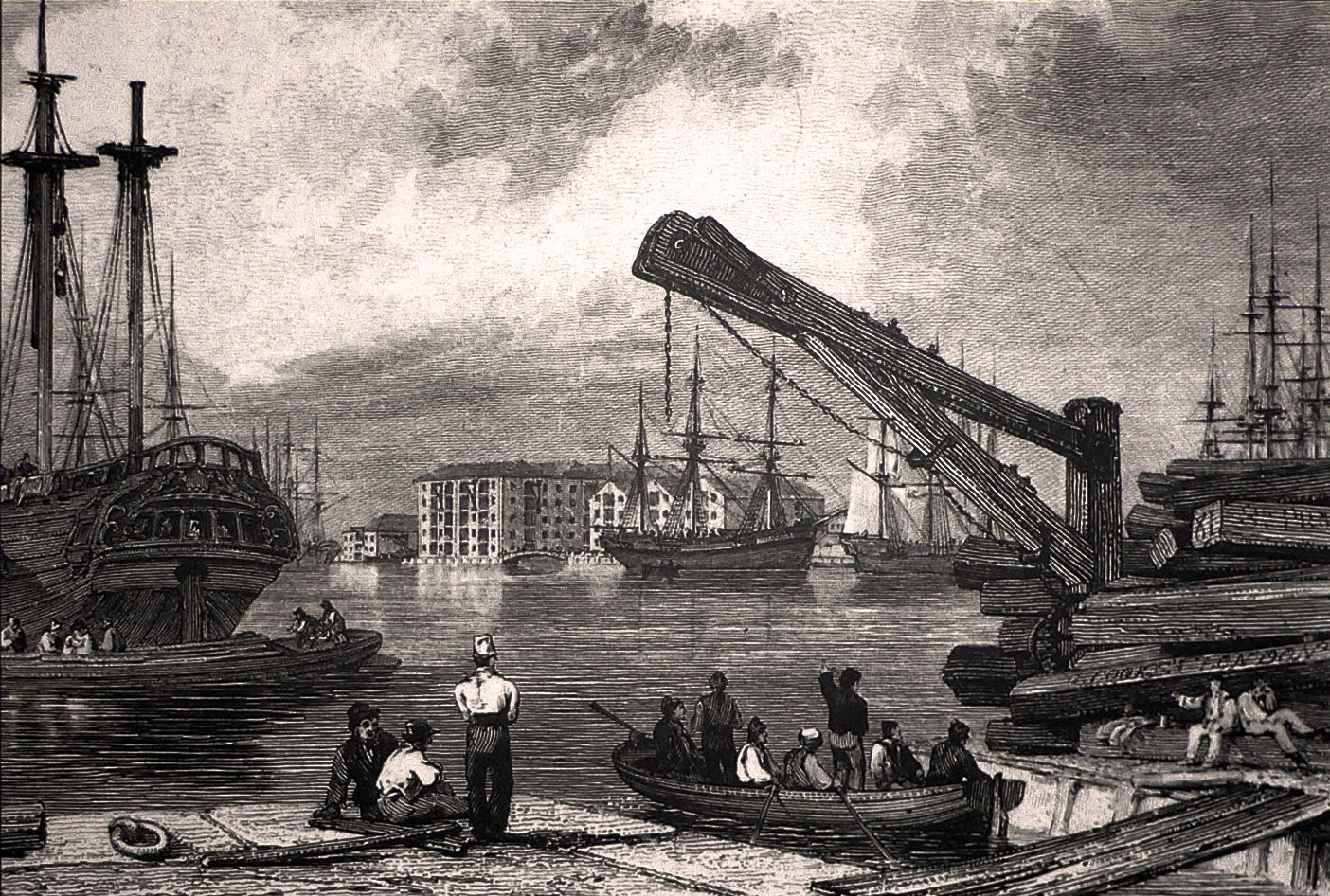
Commercial Docks, Rotherhithe, London (engraved after unknown artist, 1827)

George Cooke (22 January 1781 – 27 February 1834), was an English line engraver.

== Life and work ==
Cooke was born in London in 1781. His father was a native of Frankfurt, Germany, who in early life settled in England and became a wholesale confectioner. At the age of 14, George Cooke was apprenticed to James Basire (1730-1802). Around the end of his apprenticeship he engraved many plates for Brewer's The Beauties of England and Wales, some in conjunction with his elder brother, William Bernard Cooke.

Afterwards, he produced engravings for Pinkerton's 16-volume Collection of Voyages and Travels, during which his brother William made plans for the first edition of The Thames, to which George Cooke contributed two plates. This work was followed by Picturesque Views on the Southern Coast of England, from drawings made principally by Turner. It was commenced in 1814 and completed in 1826, and George Cooke engraved 15 plates, nearly one-third of the total, and some vignettes. Next appeared an improved edition of The Thames, for which he engraved the 'Launch of the Nelson' and the 'Fair on the Thames,' after Luke Clennell, and the 'Opening of Waterloo Bridge,' after Philip Reinagle.

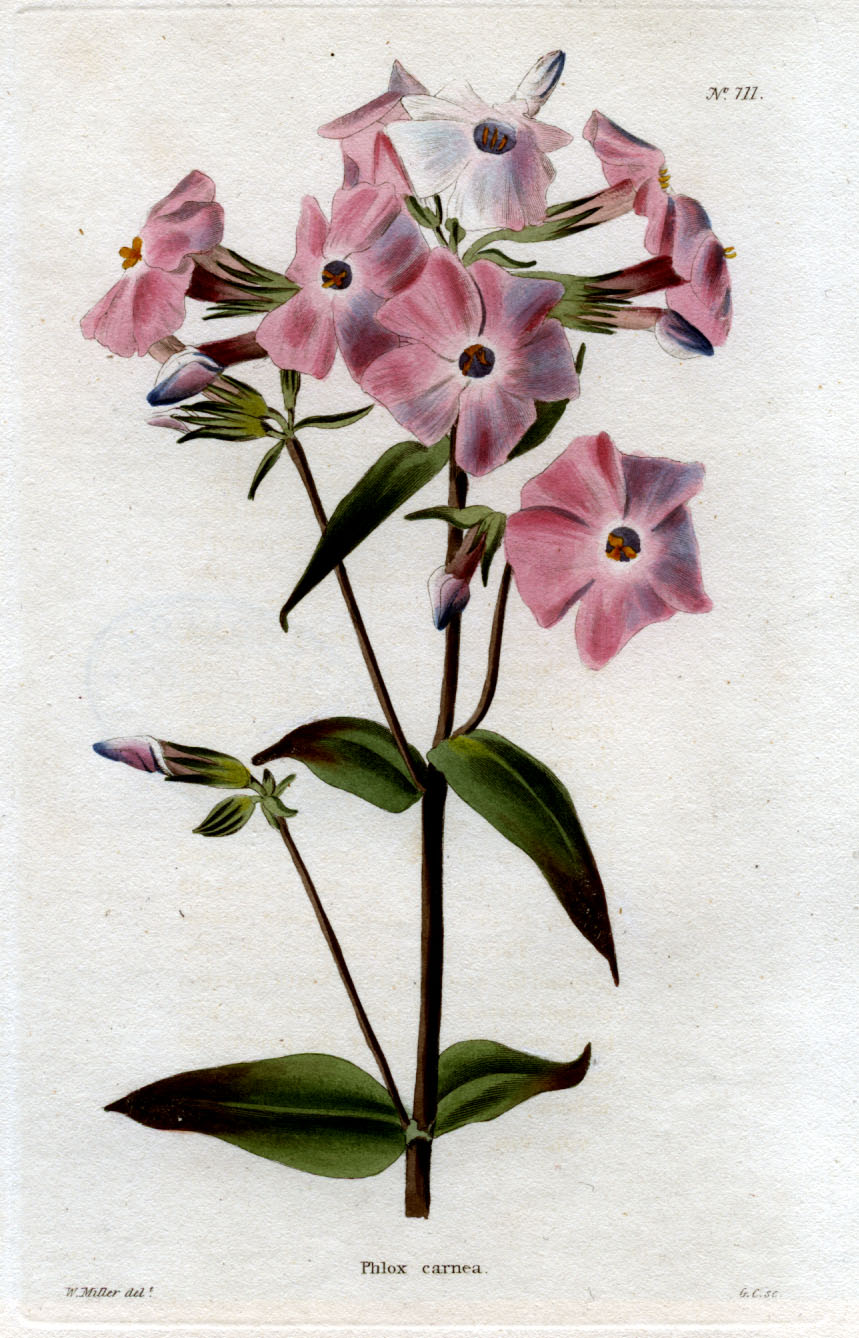
"Phlox carnea", engraving after William Miller (from "The Botanical Cabinet", 1818)

Between 1817 and 1833 he produced, in connection with Loddiges of Hackney, London a number of plates for the Botanical Cabinet,' and about the same time he engraved some of the plates, after Turner, for Hakewill's Picturesque Tour of Italy, 1820, and Sir Walter Scott's Provincial Antiquities and Picturesque Scenery of Scotland, 1826, in which latter work should be especially noted "Edinburgh from the Calton Hill". To these were added plates for Thomas Allason's Antiquities of Pola, 1819, John Spencer-Stanhope's Olympia, (published by Rodwell and Martin, 1824), and D'Oyly and Mant's Bible, as well as some of those for John Hughes' Views in the South of France, chiefly on the Rhone, after Peter De Wint.

Besides these Cooke engraved a few plates for the publications of the Dilettanti Society, and for the Ancient Marbles in the British Museum, and the Ancient Terracottas in the same collection, and single plates after Turner of a "View of Gledhow" for Whitaker's Loidis and Elmete, and "Wentworth House" for Thomas Dunham Whitaker's History of Richmondshire. In 1815, he produced some lithographs for Henry Holland's Travels in the Ionian Isles, .... He also engraved the "Iron Bridge at Sunderland", from an outline by Edward Blore; for Surtees's History of Durham; and the "Monument of Sir Francis Bacon" in St Michael's Church, St Albans, for Robert Clutterbuck's History of Hertfordshire.

In 1825, Cooke finished his fine engraving of "Rotterdam", from Augustus Wall Callcott's picture belonging to the Earl of Essex, and shortly afterwards issued a prospectus announcing a series of plates from Callcott's works, of which two, "Antwerp" and "Dover", were begun and considerably advanced when vexation at the loss of the proceeds of his 'Rotterdam,'caused by the failure of his agent, led to their abandonment.

He then began, in 1826, the Views in London and its Vicinity, engraved from drawings by Callcott, Stanfield, Roberts, Prout, Stark, Harding, Cotman, and Havell, ending with the 12th issue just before his death.

In 1833, Cooke produced Views of the Old and New London Bridges, executed conjointly with his son, Edward William Cooke, who also made the drawings. He also produced plates for Frederick Nash's Views in Paris, Colonel Batty's Views of European Cities, Baron Taylor's Spain published by Robert Jennings, Rhodes's Peak Scenery and Yorkshire Scenery, several for Stark's Scenery of the Rivers of Norfolk, and one of "Southampton", after Copley Fielding, for the Gallery of the Society of Painters in Water Colours.

Cooke was one of the original members of the "Society of Associated Engravers", who joined together for the purpose of engraving the pictures in the National Gallery, and two of his plates were in preparation at the time of his death. He likewise attempted engraving in mezzotint, and in that style executed a plate of 'Arundel Castle,' after Turner; but it was not a success, and was never published.

Cooke died of 'brain fever' on 27 February 1834 at Barnes, where he was buried.
