= Common eel =

Common eel is a common name for several fishes and may refer to:

- Anguilla anguilla, native to the Atlantic Ocean and rivers in Europe
- Anguilla rostrata, native to the Atlantic Ocean and rivers in the Americas
- Congresox talabonoides, native to the Indian and western Pacific Oceans
