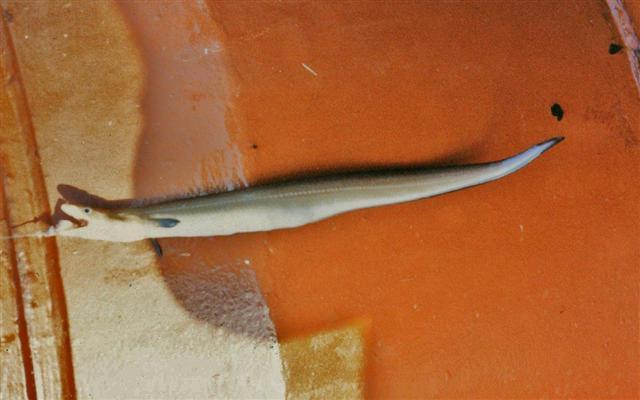

Conservation status
- Data Deficient (IUCN 3.1)

Scientific classification
- Kingdom: Animalia
- Phylum: Chordata
- Class: Actinopterygii
- Order: Anguilliformes
- Family: Muraenesocidae
- Genus: Cynoponticus
- Species: C. coniceps

Binomial name
- Cynoponticus coniceps (Jordan & Gilbert, 1882)

Synonyms
- Muraenesox coniceps Jordan & Gilbert, 1882

= Cynoponticus coniceps =

Species of fish

Cynoponticus coniceps, the red pike conger or conehead eel, is an eel in the family Muraenesocidae (pike congers). It was described by David Starr Jordan and Charles Henry Gilbert in 1882, originally under the genus Muraenesox. It is a marine, tropical eel which is known from the eastern central and southeastern Pacific Ocean, including Mexico, Ecuador, Colombia, Costa Rica, Guatemala, El Salvador, Honduras, Panama, Peru, and Nicaragua. It dwells at a depth range of 10 to 100 metres (33 to 328 ft), and inhabits sediments of sand and mud. Males can reach a maximum total length of 202 centimetres (80 in); the maximum recorded weight is 11.0 kilograms (24.3 lb).

The red pike conger's diet consists of finfish and invertebrates. It is of commercial interest to fisheries, and is considered to have high quality flesh. It is also captured as a by-catch by shrimp trawlers.

The IUCN redlist currently lists Cynoponticus coniceps as Data Deficient, due to a lack of information on how the species is affected by fishing activities.
