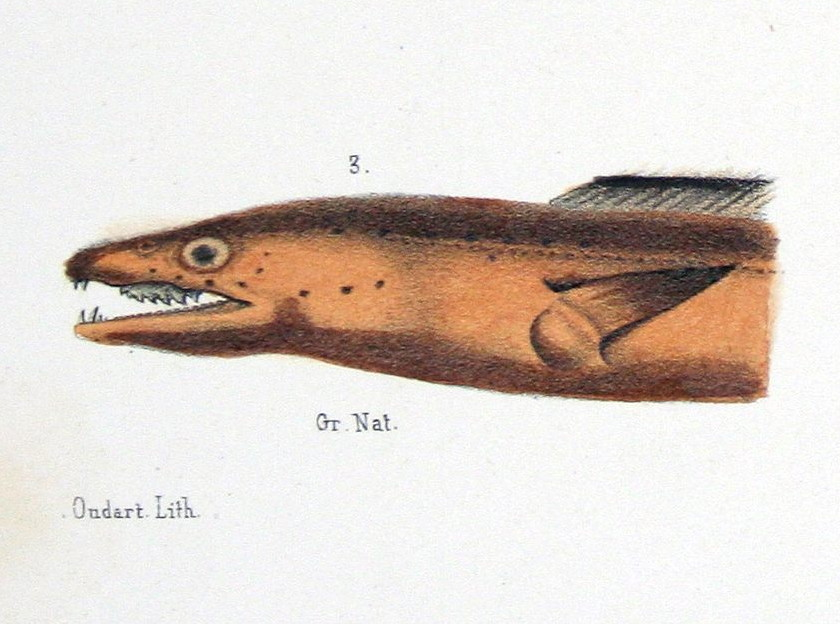
- Cynoponticus savanna

Scientific classification
- Kingdom: Animalia
- Phylum: Chordata
- Class: Actinopterygii
- Order: Anguilliformes
- Family: Muraenesocidae
- Genus: Cynoponticus; O. G. Costa, 1845

Type species
- Cynoponticus ferox Costa, 1846

Species
- 3 described species, see text

= Cynoponticus =

Genus of fishes

Cynoponticus is a genus of marine ray-fiined fishes belonging to the family Muraenesocidae, the pike congers. The fishes in this genus are found in the Eastern and Western Atlantic Oceans and the Eastern Pacific Ocean, with a single parapatric species in each region.

== Taxonomy ==
Cynoponticus was first proposed as a genus in 1845 by the Italian zoologist Oronzio Gabriele Costa, although the formal description of what was then its only species, C. ferox, was not published until 1846. The pages of Costa's publication were sold separately, in sets which were not organised systematically or chronologically, hence the different publication dates. The type locality of C. ferox was given as Ischia, an island in the Gulf of Naples. This genus is classified within the family Muraenesocidae, part of the suborder Congroidei in the order Anguilliformes, the eels.

== Etymology ==
Cyanoponticus combins cynos, the latinised form of kynos, a Greek word for dog" with ponticus, meaning "of the sea", and so means "sea dog". This name is an allusion to the freocious appearance of C. ferox which Costa described as having a "large mouth armed … with feral teeth".

== Species ==
Cynoponticus has the following three species classified within it:

- Cynoponticus coniceps (D. S. Jordan & C. H. Gilbert, 1882) (Red pike conger)
- Cynoponticus ferox O. G. Costa, 1846 (Guinean pike conger)
- Cynoponticus savanna (Bancroft, 1831) (Guayana pike conger)

== Characteristics ==
Cynoponticus pike congers have heavy bodies with large conical heads, the tail is equivalent to 60% of the total length. The eyes are covered in skin, the anterior nostril is tube-shaped while the posterior nostril is an elliptical hole. The mouth is long with robust jaws which have multiple rows of well developed teeth, with another three rows of vomerine teeth, the middle rwo being very well developed and triangular. The larger teeth at the front of the lower jaw fit into a groove on the underside of the snout. The crescent-shaped gill openings are large, low set and almost meet ventrally. The large pectoral fins are centred on the upper margin of the gill openings.The long dorsal and anal fins merge with the caudal fin, the dorsal fin has its origin either above or just in front of the gill openinds. The obvious lateral line runs along the whole length of the body, with many systems of open pores, although there are no pores on the head. The largest published total length for this genus is 202 cm (80 in) for a red pike conger (C. coniceps).

== Distribution and habitat ==
Cynoponticus pike congers are tropical and subtropical species with one species,C. coniceps, in the Eastern Pacific Ocean, another, C. savanna, in the Western Atlantic and the third, C. ferox, in the Eastern Atlantic. They are found over soft substrates at depths down to 100 m (330 ft).
