= Edward Bancroft =

American physician (1745–1821)

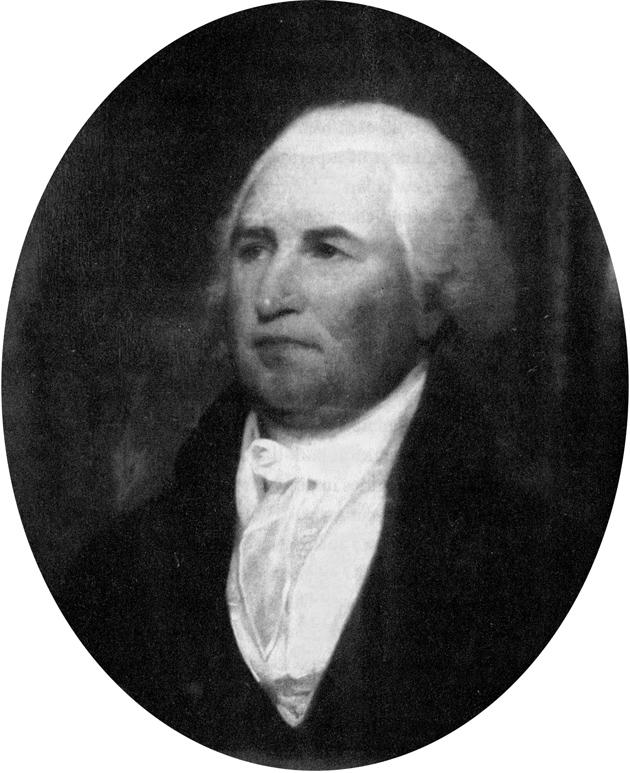
- Born: Edward Bartholomew Bancroft; January 20, 1745; Westfield, Massachusetts, British America
- Died: September 7, 1821 (aged 76); Margate, Kent, United Kingdom
- Occupations: Scientist, writer, doctor, and spy (double agent) during the American Revolutionary War
- Spouse: Penelope Fellows (m. 1771; died 1784)
- Children: 7, including Edward Nathaniel Bancroft

Edward Bartholomew Bancroft (January 20, 1745 [O.S. January 9, 1744] – September 7, 1821) was an American physician and chemist who became a double agent, spying for both the United States and Great Britain while serving as secretary to the American commission in Paris during the American Revolutionary War.

== Early life ==
Bancroft was born on January 20, 1745, in Westfield, Massachusetts. His father died of an epileptic seizure when Bancroft was two years old, and his mother remarried five years later to David Bull of Connecticut.

There Bancroft studied under Silas Deane, a schoolmaster who later became an important politician and diplomat with whom he would work in Paris. At the age of sixteen, Bancroft was apprenticed to a physician in Killingworth, Connecticut, but after a few years ran away. (Bancroft returned and repaid his debt to his former master in 1766.)

== South America and London ==
On July 14, 1763, after fleeing his apprenticeship, Bancroft left New England for the sugar-producing slave colonies of Dutch Guiana, where he became a plantation doctor. He soon expanded his practice to multiple plantations and wrote a study of the local environment. Based on observations of experiments already being performed on live eels by Dutch colonists in and around Surinam and Essequibo, Bancroft concluded that American eels and torpedo fish discharged electricity to stun their prey, rather than by an imperceptibly swift mechanical action, as had previously been argued. Although he left South America in 1766, he published An Essay on the Natural History of Guiana, in South America in London 1769, where with the encouragement of Benjamin Franklin, he embarked on a career as a man of letters. Bancroft later wrote extensively about the chemistry of dyes, based in part on his work in Dutch Guiana, contrasting non-European dyeing techniques unfavorably with the learned "philosophical chemistry" of natural philosophers like himself.

In London, Bancroft's Natural History of Guiana (1769) attracted the attention of Paul Wentworth, New Hampshire's colonial agent in London, who hired Bancroft to survey Wentworth's plantation in Surinam and make recommendations for more efficient operation. Bancroft spent two months there before returning to London. While in Surinam, Bancroft wrote a three-volume, semi-autobiographical novel, The History of Charles Wentworth, Esq. The epistolary novel, which follows the life of a plantation owner (with the same surname as his friend and employer), imitates Voltaire's Candide and reflects Bancroft's deistic beliefs, ridiculing passages in the Bible and criticizing Christianity for its "detestable spirit of intolerance and persecution."

In 1771 Edward married the twenty-two year old Penelope Fellows, daughter of a prominent Catholic family. A son, Edward, was born in 1772; they eventually had six more children. Bancroft was elected a fellow of the Royal Society in 1773 as "a gentleman versed in natural history and Chymistry, and author of the natural history of Guiana". In the summer of 1773, Bancroft joined the Medical Society of London, though he did not receive his M.D. from the University of Aberdeen until 1774.

== Spying for the Americans in London ==
When the Committee of Secret Correspondence sent Silas Deane (Bancroft's former teacher) to France in 1776, Franklin instructed Deane to contact Bancroft, believing he would be a source of useful information. Deane arrived in France on June 7, 1776; the next day he wrote to Bancroft in London, asking him to come to Paris. In the letter, Deane said they would discuss procuring goods for trading with the Indians, and he enclosed thirty pounds (a generous amount) for travel expenses. Deane did not mention political issues in case the letter was intercepted. Bancroft met with Deane on July 8 and learned that Deane's purpose in France was to win French aid for the Americans against Britain. While Bancroft declined the invitation to attend negotiations, he did serve as Deane's assistant and interpreter. Deane's negotiations resulted in France sending some supplies to the Americans.

Deane told Bancroft that American leaders hoped to embroil Britain in a war against other foes (specifically, an alliance of France and Prussia), which they hoped would distract Britain. Though Deane and other Americans thought France would form an alliance, the ploy came to nothing. Nevertheless, it greatly troubled Bancroft. On July 26, 1776, Bancroft returned to London, assuring Deane that he would spy for the colonies. In London, Bancroft sent copies of recent newspapers and pamphlets on current affairs and long letters to Deane to keep the Americans informed about the thinking of the British government and people. Bancroft arranged to have his dispatches smuggled into France in French diplomatic pouches to avoid having them opened by the London post office. In December 1776, the arsonist John the Painter set a fire near the Portsmouth dock and then visited Bancroft. Bancroft refused to give him any assistance.

== Spying for the British ==
Though Bancroft had worked for Franklin and Deane, he was unenthusiastic about American independence, and the possibility of a French war against Britain alarmed him. Despite his promise to Deane, he had reservations about doing anything that might promote a rift between Britain and the American colonies.

In London he met Paul Wentworth, recently recruited by the British Secret Service. Wentworth arranged for Bancroft to meet Secret Service chief William Eden and Lords Suffolk and Weymouth, where Bancroft agreed to become a spy for Britain. A couple of days later, on August 14, 1776, Bancroft composed a nine-page report detailing what Deane had been able to accomplish since arriving in France. In early February 1777, Bancroft visited John the Painter while he was in prison in London.

Soon after this, Franklin arrived to take over the negotiations with France. Bancroft was ordered to associate himself with Franklin. Fortuitously, Franklin appointed Bancroft as secretary to the American Commission in Paris. On March 26, 1777, Bancroft departed London for Paris, where his wife and children joined him two months later. For his spying, the British promised Bancroft a pension of £200. (This amount was later increased to £500 and then £1,000.)

Bancroft assisted Franklin and Deane by copying letters and other documents, by translating diplomatic correspondence into French or English, and by arranging for repairs, hiring crews, and buying supplies for American ships in French ports. Thus Bancroft had access to much sensitive information that he was able to pass along to the British.

Bancroft reported under the cover of weekly letters to "Mr. Richards", signed "Edward Edwards", about "gallantry" (exploits with women). But between the lines of the cover text, Bancroft wrote his reports in a special ink. Every Tuesday after 9:30 PM, he put the letter in a bottle, tied a string around it, and left it in a hole in a certain box tree in Paris. A British official retrieved the message and replaced it with new orders. Bancroft would return later that night to recover the bottle. Through this method, George III may have seen the French-American Treaty of Alliance just two days after it was signed. Bancroft was "successful but ineffective"; that is, though he gathered a good deal of information, the British were unable to prevent a Franco-American alliance.

In December 1777, John Paul Jones arrived in France, expecting to be given command of the ship Indien being built in Amsterdam. Because of intelligence provided by Bancroft, the British successfully pressured the Dutch to cancel the sale of the ship. Nevertheless, with smaller vessels, Jones successfully raided coastal towns in England and Ireland and captured two British warships despite regular intelligence provided the British by Bancroft. Unaware that Bancroft was a British spy, Jones and Bancroft became close friends, and Jones even used him as an intermediary with Franklin. (Note: In May 1778, Jones wrote to Bancroft asking for funds to feed his crew and the British prisoners they had taken; Franklin provided the money.) In the summer of 1777, Arthur Lee charged that Bancroft had met with members of king's privy council; and in April 1778, a sea captain named Musco Livingston told Lee that in London he had seen a letter written by Bancroft that provided details about the French treaty before it had been signed. When Lee accused Bancroft of being a traitor, Jones came to his defense; and in early 1779, Jones convinced Livingston to retract his accusation. (Livingston's accusations had been true, but the rumor that Bancroft had met with the privy council was not.)

=== Franklin's possible knowledge of Bancroft's intrigue ===
On January 19, 1777, Franklin wrote to Juliana Ritchie, a woman living in a Benedictine convent in Cambrai, that even if he suspected his valet to be a spy, "as he probably is, I think I should not discharge him for that, if in other Respects I lik'd him." Although some historians believe the letter indicates Franklin's suspicion of Bancroft, others have noted that after the war, Franklin remained on good terms with Bancroft while he shunned other Loyalists, including his own son, William. The vast majority of historians reject the thesis that Franklin was in any way disloyal to the United States.

== Death of Silas Deane ==
After the death of former American diplomat Silas Deane in 1789 aboard a ship about to sail to America, Bancroft suggested in a private conversation that Deane had committed suicide. The following year an anonymous pamphlet, Theodosius, attacked the scientist and clergyman Joseph Priestley by claiming that while dying, Deane had uttered blasphemous and atheistic statements that he had supposedly derived from Priestley. Priestley, who had never met Deane, pleaded with Bancroft to set the record straight. Bancroft responded by publishing in several newspapers an account provided by the ship's captain, which stated that Deane had become suddenly ill and had been unable to say anything comprehensible during the four hours before his death.

In 1959, historian Julian Boyd suggested that Bancroft might have poisoned Deane, then spread rumors that Deane had committed suicide in an attempt to cover up the murder. In the years since Boyd's articles appeared, his thesis has been largely dismissed as "ungrounded conjectures"; nevertheless, the theory has been widely publicized in a popular American textbook: James West Davidson and Mark Hamilton Lytle, After the Fact: The Art of Historical Detection (Boston: McGraw Hill, 1982 [sixth edition, 2010]).

== Life after the Revolutionary War ==
Following the Revolutionary War, Bancroft obtained patents to import black oak into Britain and France to be turned into a yellow dye called quercitron; and he convinced John Paul Jones to invest a large sum in the business. In 1789 Jones accused Bancroft of fraud and withholding money owed him. Gouverneur Morris tried to mediate the dispute, and Bancroft did make small payments to Jones; but when Jones died in July 1792, Bancroft apparently still owed him £1,800.

In 1794, Bancroft published Experimental Researches Concerning the Philosophy of Permanent Colors, a book he updated in 1814. He was also elected a Foreign Honorary Member of the American Academy of Arts and Sciences in 1797. Bancroft's wife, Penelope, died on May 10, 1784, at home in London while Bancroft was on a trip to Philadelphia. Bancroft himself died on September 7, 1821, at Addington Place in Margate. Bancroft's activity as a double agent was not revealed until 1891, when British diplomatic papers were released to the public.

== See also ==
- Intelligence in the American Revolutionary War
- Intelligence operations in the American Revolutionary War
