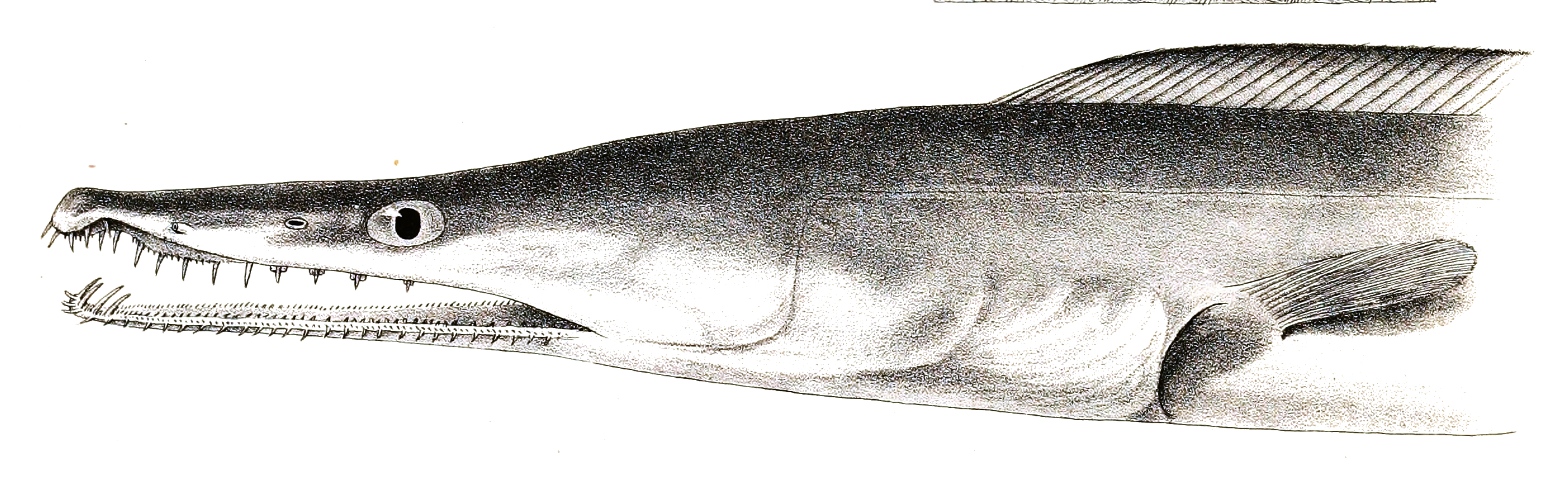

Scientific classification
- Kingdom: Animalia
- Phylum: Chordata
- Class: Actinopterygii
- Order: Anguilliformes
- Family: Muraenesocidae
- Genus: Congresox
- Species: C. talabonoides

Binomial name
- Congresox talabonoides (Bleeker, 1853)

Synonyms
- Conger talabonoides Bleeker, 1853; Muraenesox talabonoides (Bleeker, 1853); Congresox talabanoides (Bleeker, 1853); Congresox telabonoides (Bleeker, 1853)

= Congresox talabonoides =

Species of fish

Congresox talabonoides, the Indian pike conger, common eel, conger-pike eel, daggertooth pike-conger or Indian putyekanipa, is an eel in the family Muraenesocidae (pike congers). It was described by Pieter Bleeker in 1853. It is a marine, tropical eel which is known from the Indo-Western Pacific, including Somalia, India, Sri Lanka, Indonesia, the Philippines, Hong Kong and Taiwan. It dwells at a depth range of 800 to 875 metres (2,625 to 2,871 ft), and inhabits soft sediments in coastal waters and estuaries. Males can reach a maximum total length of 250 centimetres (98 in), but more commonly reach a TL of 180 centimetres (71 in).

Congresox talabonoides is amphidromous; spawning is reported in India to occur in April–May and September–October. Its diet consists of bony fish, shrimp, and other benthic crustaceans. It is a commercial fish in markets, and is mostly sold fresh.
