= Philip Dottin Souper =

British colonial administrator (1801–1861)

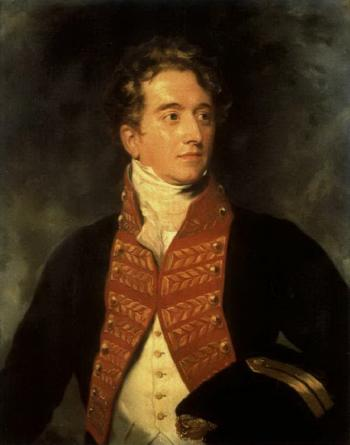
- Philip Dottin Souper, portrait by Ramsay Richard Reinagle
- Born: 3 April 1824; Middlesex, England
- Died: 13 November 1861 (aged 60); Southampton, England

Philip Dottin Souper (3 October 1801 – 13 November 1861) was an English colonial administrator and railway company secretary.

== Early life ==
Souper was born in Middlesex, England. He was baptised in 1802 in London and presented to the church in 1803 in Saint Helier, Jersey, the son of William Henry Souper and Amelia Ann; his mother was the daughter of Philip Reinagle. His father was a British Army officer, in the 1st Regiment of Foot. He exchanged in 1797 into a regiment raised to serve in the West Indies. It was led by William Myers, had incorporated the St Vincent Rangers, and was known as "Myers' Regiment of Foot". He was paymaster of the Chasseurs Britanniques at the time the family was in Jersey.

In 1813, Souper's father was transferred to become a paymaster at Lymington, Dorset.

In a noted case, he was convicted of murder in Lymington in 1814, after a duel in which he killed another officer. The judge, Sir Henry Dampier, recommended mercy. It was then reported that Henry William and Amelia Ann Souper had a family of six sons and a daughter. In 1817, Souper became a lieutenant in the York Chasseurs, which he had joined as an ensign in May 1815. This formation took part in the Invasion of Guadeloupe.

He was placed on half pay in 1817, and became paymaster of the recruiting district at Harwich, for foreign troops.

== Trinidad ==
Philip Dottin Souper became Colonial Secretary of Trinidad under Ralph Woodford, Governor from 1813. Woodford used very young officials for administrative work, and kept them on a short leash. It was noted that an attempt to bribe Souper was rejected. An 1834, report on the drive to reduce sinecures shows Souper taking on the dual roles of Secretary and Clerk of the council. There were in fact three defined official roles, Secretary, Clerk and Register (or court intendant, often called escribando, a term inherited from the Spanish colonial time in Trinidad). In 1810, James Chapman, who held officially the three posts, had been listed as a sinecure holder using deputies for the functions.

Therefore, Souper, who held each of these posts at some times, was for most of his career doing so as a deputy. He was absent from his post as Governor's Secretary in 1824 for reasons of bad health. The "acting escribando" in July of that year was George F. Souper. George Frederick Souper of Trinidad became a barrister of the Inner Temple, being called to the bar in 1833.

An anonymous pamphlet by "A Free Mulatto" of 1824 accused Souper of acting in a bigoted way towards a man of colour who had served in the militia, around 1820. It records alleged slurs (including the denial of the title Mr. on a passport, and on the competence of the previous Secretary Peter Gellineau). The author was Jean-Baptiste Philip, of French-speaking "free coloured" background and a doctor, and the pamphlet An Address to the Right Hon. Earl Bathurst, published in London, dealt with grievances specific to the "coloured population of Trinidad", understood free. In particular it dismissed an argument against setting a precedent for the recognition of people of colour, in relation to a "Dr. Philip" requesting a position from Woodward as military surgeon. He stated that Gellineau was moved to make room for Souper, but held posts including that of escribando. He argued that the precedent had thereby already been set. A related complaint about the council, in which Souper as Clerk was named, was that of George Pilkington, civil engineer on Trinidad and future abolitionist campaigner, from 1830. In autobiographical work he alleged that the council had acted wrongly against him on a financial matter, after he had promoted a person of colour to officer rank in the militia cavalry.

In 1829, Souper acted as executor for his uncle, Philip Reinagle (the younger), who was on Trinidad. He took part in the 1830 public meeting hosted by Robert Neilson that appointed Joseph Marryat to represent West Indian planter interests.

Under the Slavery Abolition Act 1833, Souper received compensation, for one enslaved person in Trinidad. In 1836, he was still acting as Clerk to the Council of Trinidad, but was seeking a post in New South Wales.

== Company Secretary ==
In July 1836, Souper was corresponding from John Street, The Adelphi in London, as Secretary to the South Western Railway Company. In 1837 the company reportedly reached an informal agreement with the London, Falmouth and Exeter Railway Company, a rival in the south-west of England, not to obstruct parliamentary bills. It followed a deputation from the London, Falmouth and Exeter meeting Souper.

In 1839, Souper was serving as Secretary to the Eastern Coast of Central America Commercial and Agricultural Company. He had been brought in from South Western Railway Company, resigning his post there, at the same time as Peter Harriss Abbott who had been on the board of the South Western Railway Company, and Peter Pollock QC who had been the company's counsel, both of whom went onto the board. He was replaced as Company Secretary, however, in 1840, by James A. Winsor.

Souper was Secretary to the Irish North Midland Railway in 1845. This was a proposed railway, which went out of business in August 1847, repaying investors 12 shillings in the pound. According to Alumni Cantabrigienses, Souper also worked as a surgeon.

== Last years ==
In 1848, Souper was appointed Registrar of the Court of First Instance on Mauritius. He was Registrar of the Supreme Court there, from 1852. In 1857 he was appointed collector of internal revenue on Mauritius. This position gave a seat on the Mauritius Council, ex officio, as well as position as vendue master.

Souper died at age 60, on 13 November 1861, in Queen's Terrace, Southampton, four days after disembarking from the SS Euxine; or the following day, at 3, Upper Phillimore-place, Kensington, London.

== Family ==
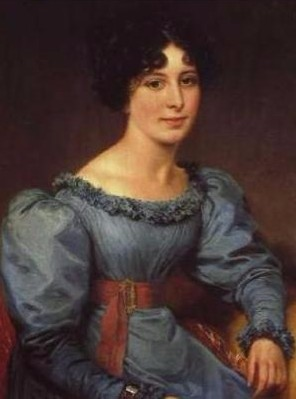
Oriana Jane Souper

During his time in Trinidad, Souper married Oriana Jane Reinagle (1804–1890), daughter of Ramsay Richard Reinagle, in 1827. This was a marriage of first cousins.

Philip and Oriana had a large family:

- Woodford Crowe (1834–17 Jan 1848)
- Charles Edward (1842–1909), army officer, born in Bedford, who married in 1871 Annie, eldest daughter of Richard Bolton McCausland
- Francis Abraham (1844–1929), clergyman, 4th son, who in 1873, married Francis (Fanny) Emmeline (1849–1888), 3rd daughter of James Beaumont, of Lee, Kent. One of their daughters, Oriana Fanny Souper, married Edward Adrian Wilson. Another daughter, Constance Mary Souper (1879–1931) married into the Bragge family – Captain OC Bragge (1876–1958)
- Sarah Johnston married Francis Frederick Rowcroft
- Julia Ann, second daughter, died 1863
- Oriana Rachel, third daughter, married in 1860 George Cleland Rowcroft, army officer, and was mother of George Francis Rowcroft DSO
- Jessie Georgiana (also Jesse, Jessey), fourth daughter, married Gerald de Courcy O'Grady
- Jane Hassall, married Rev. John Paget Parker

Frances Lloyd, one of twin daughters, died on 28 November 1839 at Eastcott, near Harrow, at the age of two. One daughter was born at Bedford in 1846.
