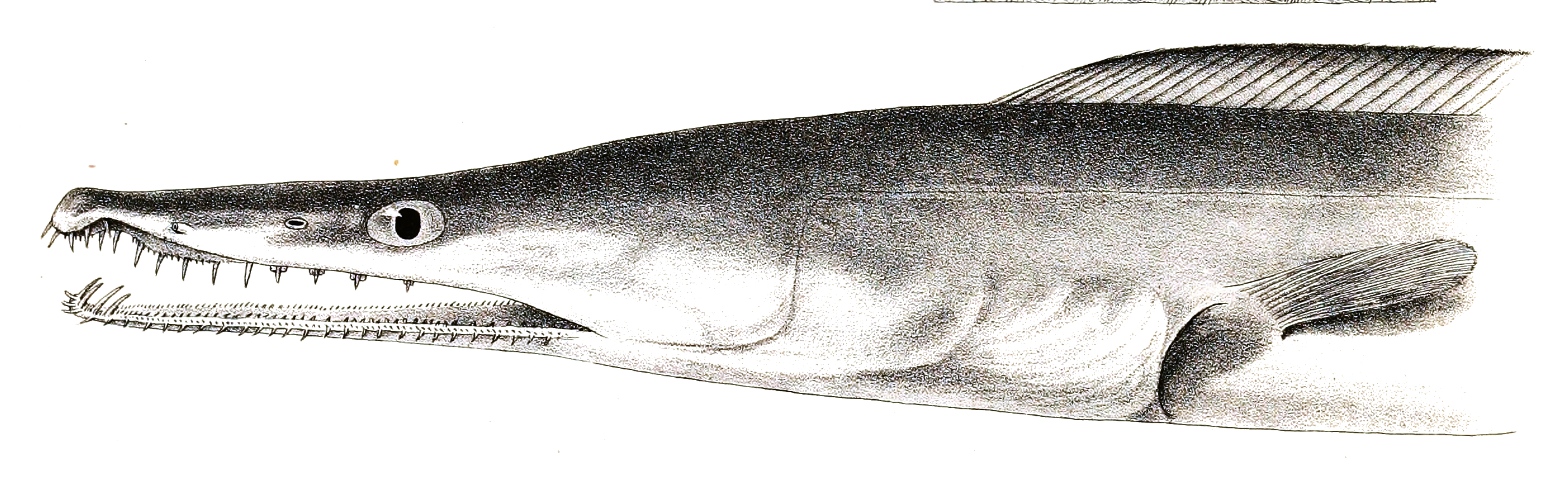
- Congresox talabonoides

Scientific classification
- Kingdom: Animalia
- Phylum: Chordata
- Class: Actinopterygii
- Order: Anguilliformes
- Family: Muraenesocidae
- Genus: Congresox; T. N. Gill, 1890

Type species
- Conger talabon Cuvier, 1829

Species
- See text

= Congresox =

Genus of fishes

Congresox is a genus of marine ray-finned fishes belonging to the family Muraenesocidae, the pike congers. The fishes in this genus are found in the Indian and Pacific Oceans.

== Species ==
Congresox contains the following two species:

- Congresox talabon (Cuvier, 1829) (yellow pike conger)
- Congresox talabonoides (Bleeker, 1853) (Indian pike conger)
