= Sauromuraenesox =

Conservation status
- Least Concern (IUCN 3.1)

Scientific classification
- Kingdom: Animalia
- Phylum: Chordata
- Class: Actinopterygii
- Order: Anguilliformes
- Family: Muraenesocidae
- Genus: Sauromuraenesox; Alcock, 1889
- Species: S. vorax

Binomial name
- Sauromuraenesox vorax Alcock, 1889

Genus of fish

Sauromuraenesox is a monospecific genus of marine ray-finned fish belonging to the family Muraenesocidae, the pike congers. The only species in the genus is Sauromuraenesox vorax which was described in 1889 by the British physician, naturalist and carcinologist Alfred William Alcock with its type locality given as the Bay of Bengal. This species is found in the northern Indian Ocean where it has been recorded off Oman, the Arabian and Andaman coasts of India, including Sri Lanka, east to Myanmar. This benthopelagic species is found over the continental shelf and upper slope over soft substrates at depths between 274 and 469 m (899 and 1,539 ft).
