= Oxyconger =

Conservation status
- Least Concern (IUCN 3.1)

Scientific classification
- Kingdom: Animalia
- Phylum: Chordata
- Class: Actinopterygii
- Order: Anguilliformes
- Family: Muraenesocidae
- Genus: Oxyconger; Bleeker, 1864
- Species: O. leptognathus

Binomial name
- Oxyconger leptognathus (Bleeker, 1858)

Species of fish

Oxyconger leptognathus, the shorttail pike conger, is an eel in the family Muraenesocidae. It is the only member of the genus Oxyconger. It is found in the western Pacific Ocean from Japan to Australia.
