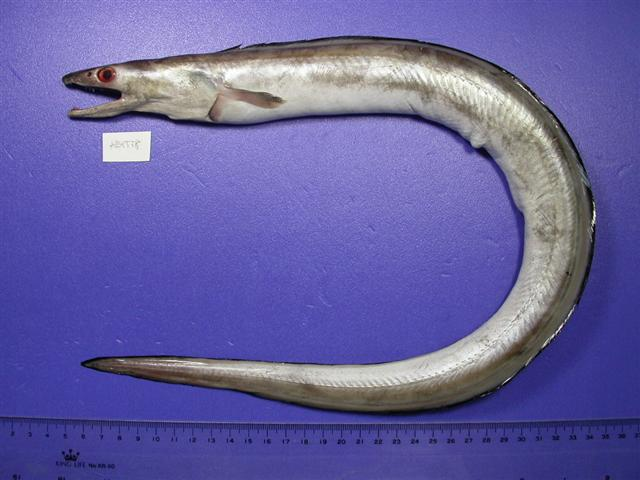
- Muraenesox cinereus

Scientific classification
- Domain: Eukaryota
- Kingdom: Animalia
- Phylum: Chordata
- Class: Actinopterygii
- Order: Anguilliformes
- Family: Muraenesocidae
- Genus: Muraenesox; McClelland, 1844

Type species
- Muraenesox tricuspidata McClelland, 1843

Species
- See text

= Muraenesox =

Genus of fishes

Muraenesox is a small genus of eels found throughout the Indo-Pacific. It currently has three described species as most species have been moved to other genera. Members are found in the Indo-West Pacific.

== Species ==
Muraenesox contains the following species:

- Muraenesox bagio (F. Hamilton, 1822) (Common Pike Conger)
- Muraenesox cinereus (Forsskål, 1775) (Daggertooth Pike Conger)
