= Jean-Baptiste Philip =

Trinidad-born doctor (1796 – 1829)

- Born: 1796; Trinidad
- Died: 1829 (aged 32–33)
- Education: University of Edinburgh
- Known for: Free Mulatto; one of the first black students at the University of Edinburgh; one of the first black doctors in the Caribbean
- Notable work: Free Mulatto
- Parent(s): John Baptiste Louis and Marie Fortin Philip

Jean-Baptiste Philip (1796–1829), sometimes spelled "Phillipe," was a Trinidad-born medical doctor and the leader of an activist group formed in Trinidad in 1823, which fought against the racist attitudes of colonial authorities through letters and petitions. He was a complex figure as he fought against racist attitudes of colonial authorities in Trinidad while also belonging to a Black slave-owning family. His famous work Free Mulatto pointed out the racist treatment of free Black people in Trinidad, but did not request the abolition of slavery.

== Early life ==
Philip was born in Trinidad in 1796. His family were members of the wealthy Black elite and owned sugar plantations in Naparima. Between 1806 and 1810, Philip left Trinidad to study literature in England, becoming the first Trinidadian to formally study literature abroad. After completing this degree, he went on to be one of the first Black students to study medicine at the University of Edinburgh in Scotland between 1812 and 1815. He graduated in 1815, and his thesis explored 'Hysterical Moods'.

After graduation he spent some time travelling in Europe, where he met and fell in love with a woman of European descent. However, following the advice of a friend, he did not marry her, and returned to Trinidad alone.

== Work in the Caribbean ==
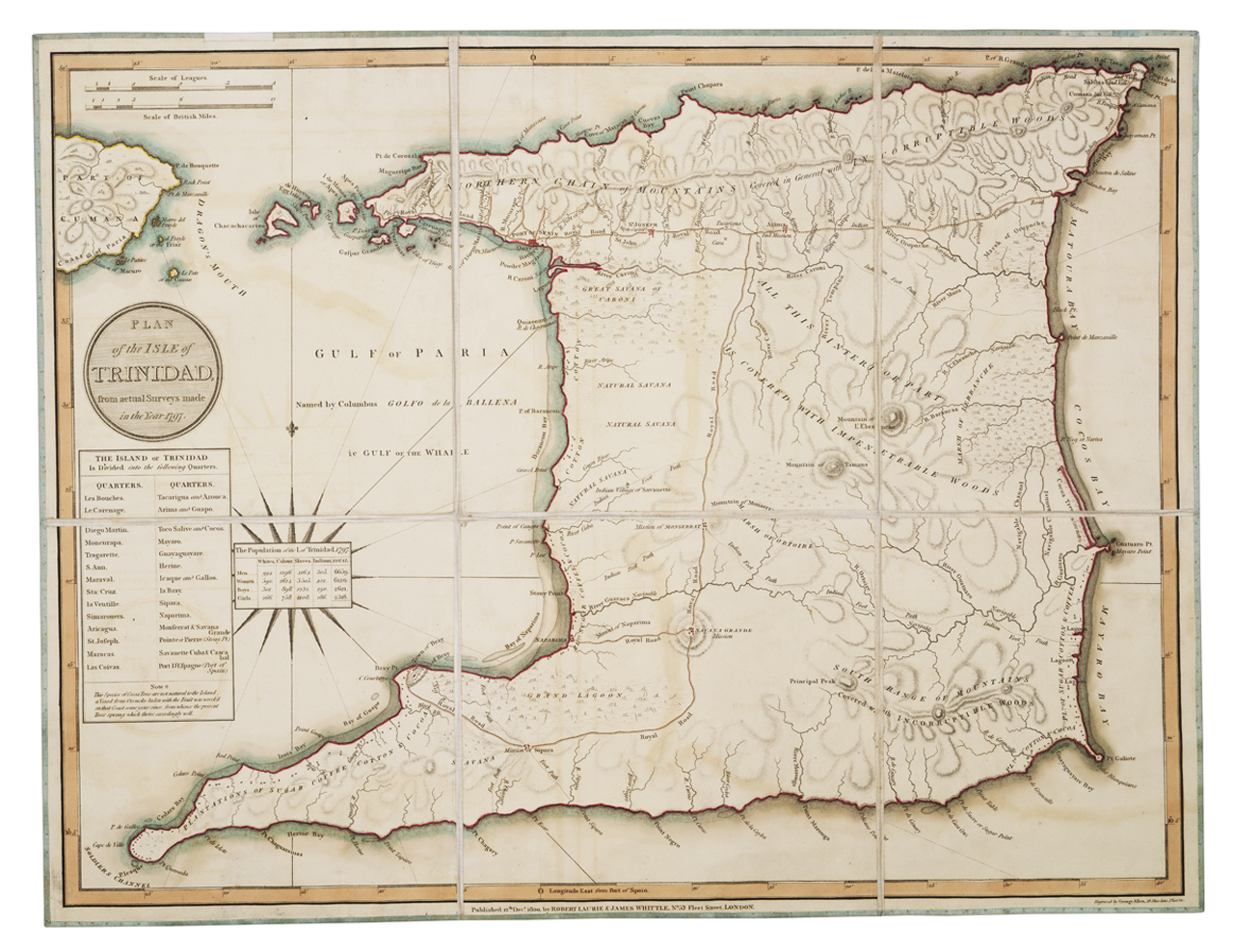
Plan of the Isle of Trinidad from surveys made in 1797

Around 1815, Philip returned to Trinidad to practice medicine as one of the first Black doctors to work in the Caribbean. Many doctors at this time were invested both politically and economically in the Trans-Atlantic Slave trade, and therefore many slaves did not receive proper medical treatment. Moreover, many doctors owned enslaved people. One doctor, William Wright, wrote that the abolition of the slave trade would be "fatal to our commerce".

Despite this, Philip sought to challenge the racial discrimination he faced in the medical profession in the Caribbean and critiqued the many inequalities between the Black and the White population. Between 1816 and 1825, Philip became the leader of the Civil Rights movement in Naparima, South Trinidad. He travelled to England between 1822 and 1823 to petition the rights of free Black people in the Caribbean. This petition was later printed and became his most famous work, Free Mulatto.

Once his father, Jean Baptiste Louis, died, Philip renounced his family's slave-run estates. As per a letter from 'Dominican' written in 1842, Philip voluntarily gave up his land and enslaved people in 1823. He bought the Aurore estate in Laventille in 1827, along with nine enslaved people. Soon after the purchase, the enslaved people were removed from the estate.

== Free Mulatto ==
Philip wrote A Free Mulatto: An Address to the Right Hon. Earl Bathurst in 1823. The text was a call on the British governor of Trinidad, Bathurst to grant the "coloured population" of the island the same "civil and political privileges as their white fellow subjects." The use of the term "coloured" in the text refers to the free Black population, but excludes slaves. Philip states that the text aims to highlight the prejudices free Blacks in Trinidad face in order to inspire Bathurst to act.

Philip writes that after the Spanish capitulated Trinidad to the British in 1797, the condition and treatment of the free Black population was undermined by a misinterpretation of Spanish colonial policies and the introduction of additional repressive laws. Philip presents the introduction of these repressive laws as a response to agitation by whites for superiority over the Black population and references disturbances on other Caribbean islands as creating fear.

Philip traces the beginning of these repressive laws to the modification of Trinidad's laws to reflect the "code noir" of Martinique, under Colonel Picton. Philip argues that these new policies destroyed the government sanctioned liberty free Blacks in Trinidad had previously held. Later British governors made additional restrictive proclamations, which Philip describes as reducing the condition of free Blacks on the island to the same as those on other West Indian settlements. These laws included night curfews, requiring permission for dances, and having to provide proof of manumission.

As well as official laws and decrees, Philip provides evidence of racist segregationist practises such as the prevention of marriage between Black and White Trinidadians, prejudices against Black doctors and separation in churches. He also compares the unequal severity of punishment experienced by white and free Black criminals in Trinidad to argue that "criminality is lost in the glare of whiteness." On slavery, Philip celebrates the shift towards amelioration policies, but does not go so far as to ask for immediate abolition. He invokes the Haitian Revolution as evidence that ‘no privileges’ should be given to some which are inconsistent with the happiness and prosperity of the whole. However, he closes by asking for an end to the "sufferings of the coloured population." This distinction between free and non-free Blacks, reinforced differences within Trinidad's Black population.

Philip campaigned for complete racial equality in Trinidad, contributing to a larger movement of petitions between 1823 and 1824 calling for new laws that equalised free men of colour and white people.
