= Ramsay Richard Reinagle =

English painter (1775–1862)

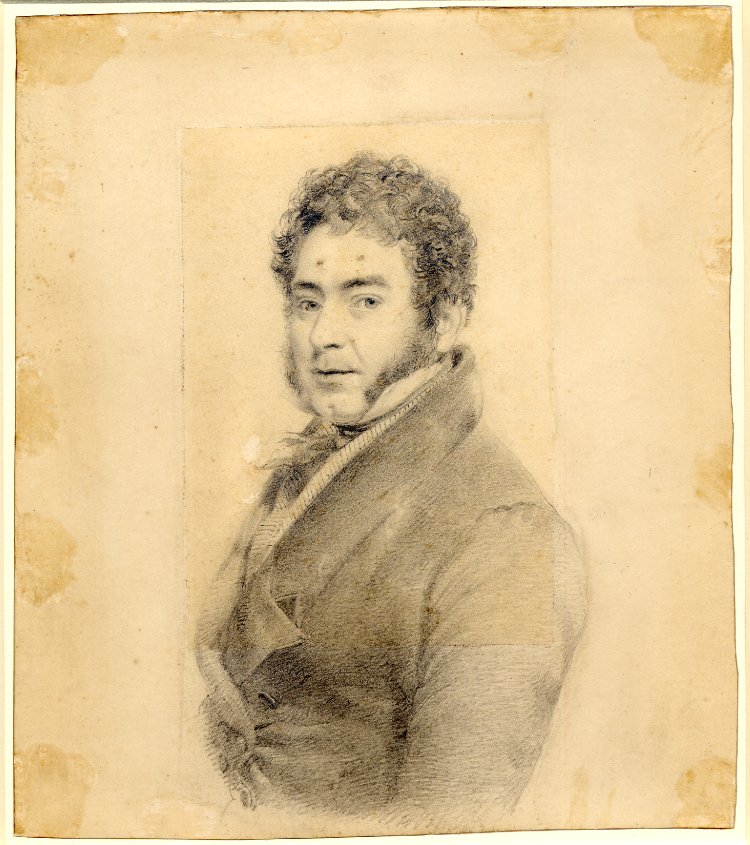
Self-portrait in graphite by Ramsay Richard Reinagle

Ramsay Richard Reinagle RA (19 March 1775 – 17 November 1862) was an English portrait, landscape, and animal painter, and son of Philip Reinagle.

== Biography ==
Portrait of John Constable, a 1799 painting of his friend John Constable.

Ramsay Richard Reinagle was a pupil of his father Philip Reinagle, whose style he followed, and he exhibited at the Royal Academy as early as 1788. He afterwards went to Italy, and was studying in Rome in 1796. Subsequently, he visited Holland in order to study from the Dutch masters. After his return home he painted for a time at Robert Barker's panorama in Leicester Square, and then entered into partnership with Thomas Edward Barker, Robert's eldest son, who was not himself an artist, in order to erect a rival building in the Strand. They produced panoramas of Rome, the Bay of Naples, Florence, Gibraltar, Bay of Gibraltar, and Paris, but in 1816 disposed of their exhibition to Henry Aston Barker and John Burford.

In 1805 Reinagle was elected an associate of the Society of Painters in Watercolours, and in 1806 a member. He became its treasurer in 1807, and was president from 1808 to 1812 Between 1806 and 1812 he sent to its exhibitions sixty-seven drawings, mostly Italian landscapes and scenery of the English lakes. During the same period he exhibited portraits and landscapes in oil at the Royal Academy, of which he became an associate in 1814, and an academician in 1823. He was a clever copyist of the old masters, and is said to have been much employed by a picture-dealer in restoring and "improving" their works.

In 1848 he sent to the Royal Academy exhibition as his own work a small picture of Shipping a Breeze and Rainy Weather off Hurst Castle painted by a young artist named J. W. Yarnold, which he had purchased at a broker's shop, and to which he had made some slight alterations. Attention was called to the deception, and a full inquiry made by the academy resulted in his being called upon to resign his diploma as a royal academician. In 1850 he unsuccessfully endeavoured to exculpate himself in two letters published in the Literary Gazette.

He continued to exhibit at the academy until 1857, but in his later years sank into poverty, and was assisted by a pension from the funds of the academy. He died at Chelsea on 17 November 1862.

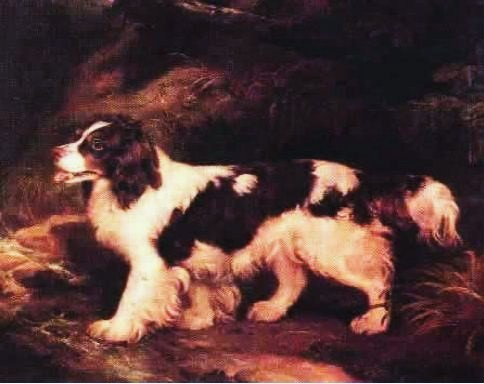
"Water Spaniel" (1815)

== Works ==
Three plates, Richmond, Sion House, and The Opening of Waterloo Bridge in William Bernard Cooke's The Thames were engraved after him by Robert Wallis, and many of the illustrations in Peacock's Polite Repository from 1818 to 1830, were engraved by John Pye from his designs. There is also a view of Haddon Hall, engraved by Robert Wallis, in the Bijou for 1828, and one of Bothwell Castle, engraved by Edward Finden, in John Tillotson's Album of Scottish Scenery, 1860. Reinagle wrote the scientific and explanatory notices to Turner's Views in Sussex published in 1819, and the life of Allan Ramsay in Allan Cunningham's Lives of the British Painters.

Reinagle's paintings are included in the collections of several British institutions including Sheffield, Rotherham, Doncaster and Derby Art Gallery and in the Government Art Collection.

== Family ==
Reinagle married Oriana Bullfinch in 1801. They had three sons, of whom George Philip Reinagle the painter, who was the youngest. There was one daughter, Oriana Jane, who married Philip Dottin Souper.
