= George Philip Reinagle =

English painter (1802–1835)

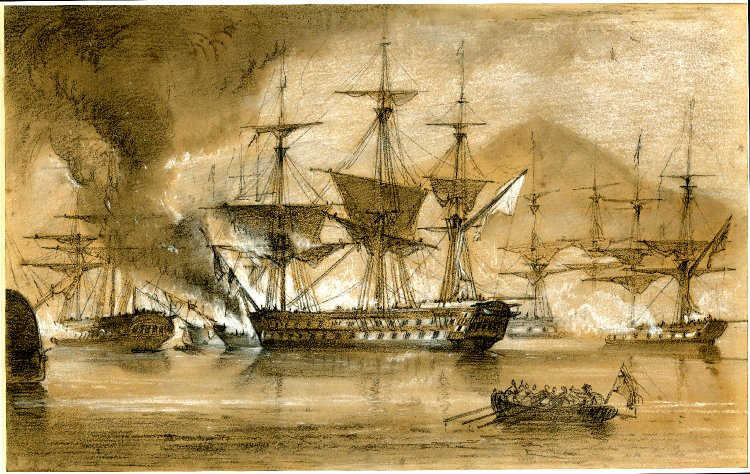
The Scipion on entering the harbour ran aboard the brûlot, chalk drawing, one of 12 sketches by Reinagle of the Battle of Navarino

George Philip Reinagle (1802 – 6 December 1835) was an English marine painter and engraver.

== Life ==
George Philip Reinagle was born in 1802 and was the youngest son of painter Ramsay Richard Reinagle (1775 –1862). He began painting alongside his father, though would mostly develop his skills by studying the works of Dutchmen Ludolf Backhuysen and Willem van de Velde. Reinagle would paint with oil as well as watercolours. He was also a draughtsman. In 1822, he presented his work for the first time at the Royal Academy, showing a nobleman's portrait, but soon turned to seascapes. He would then exhibit Ship in a Storm firing a Signal of Distress and a Calm in 1824, and A Dutch Fleet of the Seventeenth Century coming to Anchor in a Breeze the following year. He also showcased his works at the Society of British Artists.

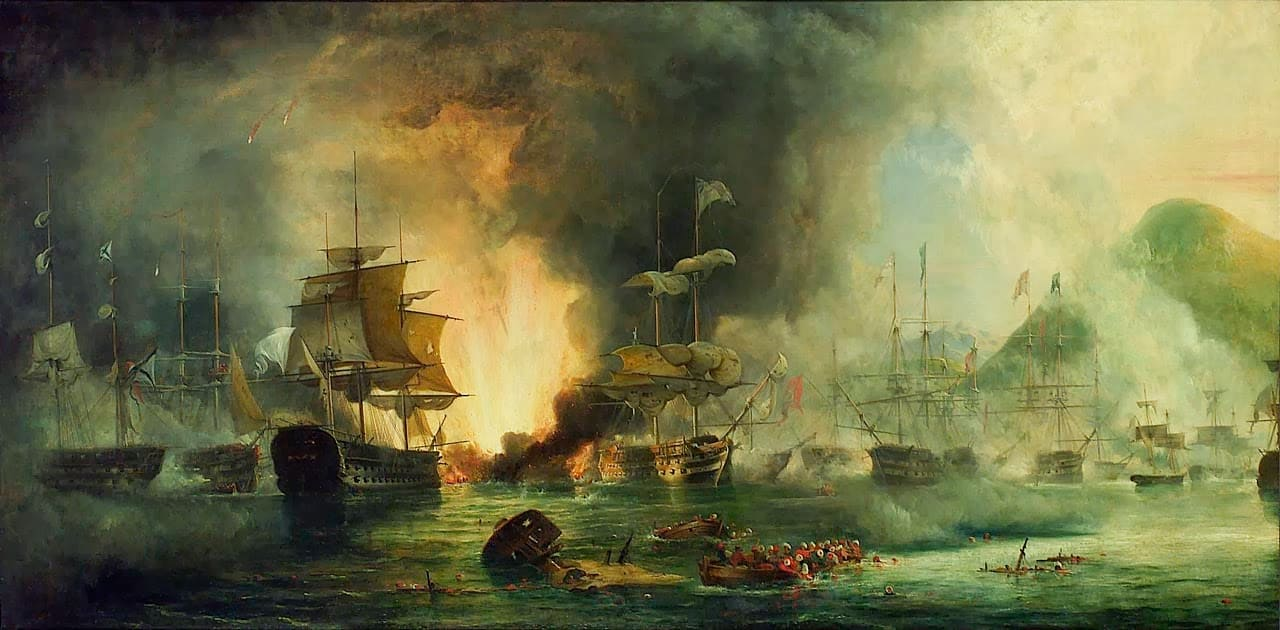
The Battle of Navarino, 1828

He went to Greece during the Greek War of Independence and in 1827 witnessed the naval battle of Navarino which he subsequently depicted the following years through a number of paintings such as Illustrations of the Battle of Navarin and Illustrations of the Occurrences at the Entrance of the Bay of Patras between the English Squadron and Turkish Fleets 1827. In 1833 he was in Portugal accompanying the British fleet. In 1834, Reinagle produced Admiral Napier's Glorious Triumph over the Miguelite Squadron after travelling with Admiral Charles Napier's fleet.

Reinagle died on 6 December 1835 in Camden Town, London at the age of 33.

His works can be found in museums and institutions in the United Kingdom and Greece, including British Museum, Royal Academy of Arts, National Maritime Museum, Athens War Museum and Hellenic Maritime Museum.
