= Philip Reinagle =

English painter (1749–1833)

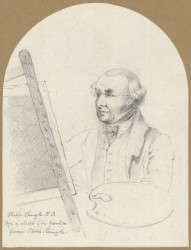

Philip Reinagle RA (1749 – 27 November 1833) was an English painter of animals, landscapes, and botanical scenes. The son of a Hungarian musician living in Edinburgh, Reinagle came to London in 1763 and after serving an apprenticeship, later became a member of the Royal Academy.

== Biography ==
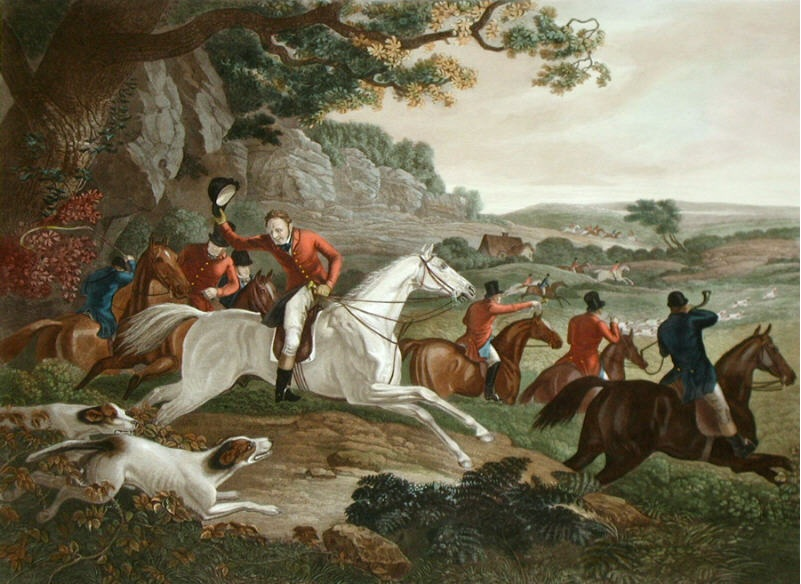
Col. Thornton Breaking Cover by Philip Reinagle

Philip Reinagle entered the schools of the Royal Academy in 1769, and later became a pupil of Allan Ramsay, whom he assisted on his numerous portraits of George III and Queen Charlotte.

He first exhibited at the Royal Academy in 1773. The works he showed were almost all portraits until 1785, when the monotonous work of producing replicas of royal portraits appears to have given him a distaste for portraiture, and led him to abandon it for animal painting. He became very successful in his treatment of sporting dogs, especially spaniels, of birds, and of dead game. In 1787, however, he showed a View taken from Brackendale Hill, Norfolk, at the academy and from then on exhibited works mostly landscapes. He was elected an associate of the Royal Academy in 1787, but did not become an academician until 1812, when he presented as his diploma picture An Eagle and a Vulture disputing with a Hyaena. He also exhibited frequently at the British Institution.

Reinagle was also an accomplished copyist of the Dutch masters, and his reproductions of cattle-pieces and landscapes by Paulus Potter, Ruisdael, Hobbema, Berchem, Wouwerman, Adriaen van de Velde, Karel Dujardin, and others have often been passed off as originals. He also made some of the drawings for Robert John Thornton's New Illustration of the Sexual System of Linnaeus (1799–1807), and for his Philosophy of Botany (1809–10); but his best drawings for book illustration were those of dogs for William Taplin's Sportsman's Cabinet (1803) which were engraved by John Scott.

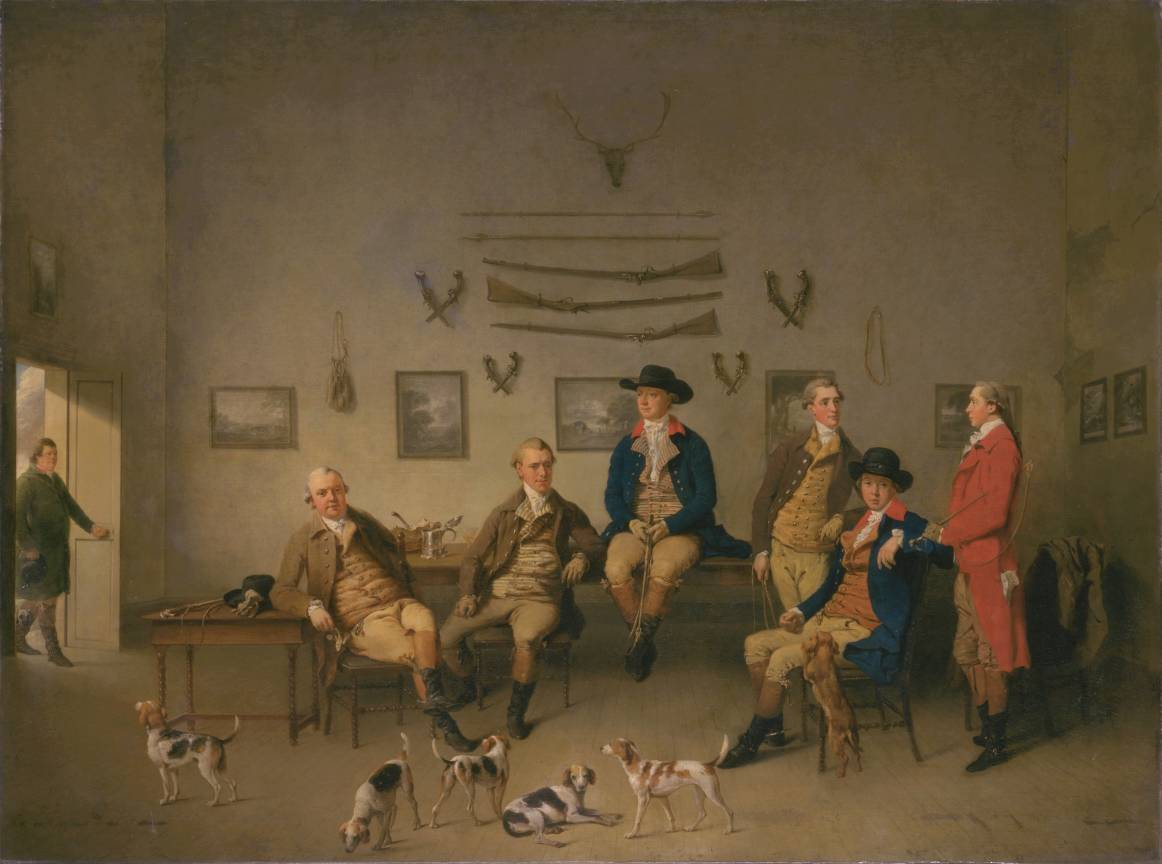
Members of the Carrow Abbey Hunt, Philip Reinagle, 1780. Tate Britain

Reinagle died at 5 York Place, Chelsea, London, on 27 November 1833, aged 84. A drawing by him, 'Fox-hunting the Death', is in the collection of the Victoria and Albert Museum.

== Family ==
In 1771 Reinagle married Jane Austin; they had nine daughters (Amelia Ann, Mary Ann, Jane, Charlotte Jenetta, Rachel Christiana, Frances Arabella, Caroline, Harriet, and Oriana Georgina), and two sons.

Of the sons, Ramsay Richard Reinagle was also an artist, and followed his father's style. The other son, Philip, went to Trinidad where he held posts including Surveyor of Port of Spain. He was responsible for the design and construction of Holy Trinity Cathedral and the Cathedral Basilica of the Immaculate Conception there.

Of the daughters:

- Amelia Ann married William Henry Souper; Philip Dottin Souper was their son, as was Robert Souper Howard.
- Mary Ann married Thomas Hayward Budd
- Charlotte Jenetta married John White, in 1808
- Frances Arabella married to John Levett-Yeats, grandson of the English merchant and planter Francis Levett

== Art copying business ==
Reinagle was known for his copying as were his daughters Charlotte Reinagle and Frances Arabella Reinagle. They had both exhibited their work at the Royal Academy and British Institution but in 1807 they decided to make money copying the work of great masters. Each year valuable paintings were lent to the British Institution and although the two of them were not allowed to recreate a complete painting they were allowed to paint details from the larger paintings. They worked rapidly as the objective was to make money. They claimed to have three day cycle where each painting was made on the first day, sold on the second and on the third they spent the profits. Their siblings Oriana Georgina, Harriet and Philip Reinagle the younger also exhibited works.
