= William Bernard Cooke =

English line engraver (1778–1855)

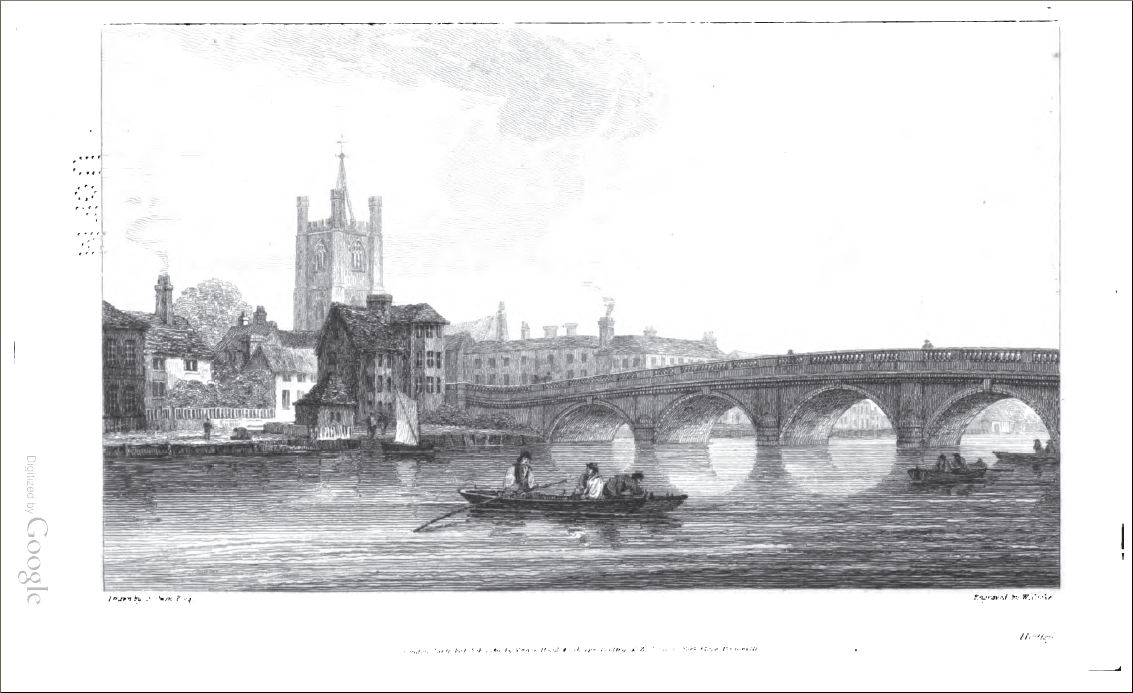
Henley bridge 1811

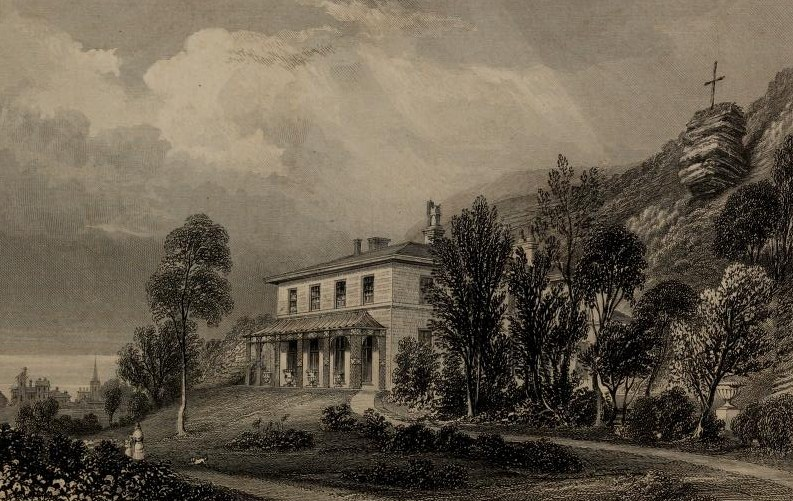
Pulpit Rock Bonchurch, 1849

William Bernard Cooke (1778 – 2 August 1855), was an English line engraver.

== Life and work ==
Cooke was born in London in 1778. He was the elder brother of George Cooke (1781–1834), and became a pupil of William Angus (1752–1821), the engraver of the "Seats of the Nobility and Gentry in Great Britain and Wales". After the termination of his apprenticeship he obtained employment upon the plates for Brewer's "Beauties of England and Wales", and then undertook the publication of "The Thames" which was completed in 1811, and for which he engraved almost all the plates after Samuel Owen.

His most important work was the "Picturesque Views on the Southern Coast of England", chiefly from drawings by J. M. W. Turner, which he produced between 1814 and 1826, conjointly with his brother, George Cooke, and for which he executed no less than twenty-two plates, besides many vignettes. He also engraved after Turner "The Source of the Tamar" and "Plymouth", and in 1819 five plates of "Views in Sussex" which were published with explanatory notices by R. R. Reinagle. Besides these he engraved "Storm clearing off", after Copley Fielding, for the Gallery of the Society of Painters in Watercolours,' 1833, as well as plates for Ebenezer Rhodes's "Peak Scenery", 1818, Peter De Wint's "Views in the South of France, chiefly on the Rhone", 1825, Cockburn's "Pompeii", 1827, Stanfield's "Coast Scenery" 1836, Noel Humphreys's "Rome and its surrounding Scenery" 1840, and other works. He likewise published "A new Picture of the Isle of Wight" 1812, and "Twenty-four select Views in Italy" 1833.

He was an engraver of considerable ability, and excelled especially in marine views, but the works which he published did not meet with much success. He died at Camberwell of heart disease, on 2 August 1855, aged 77.
