= Samuel Owen (artist) =

English painter

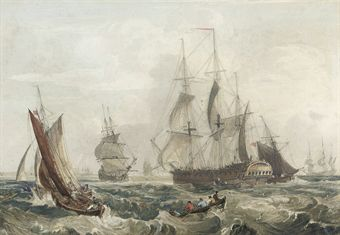
Warships in a stiff onshore breeze (pencil and watercolour)

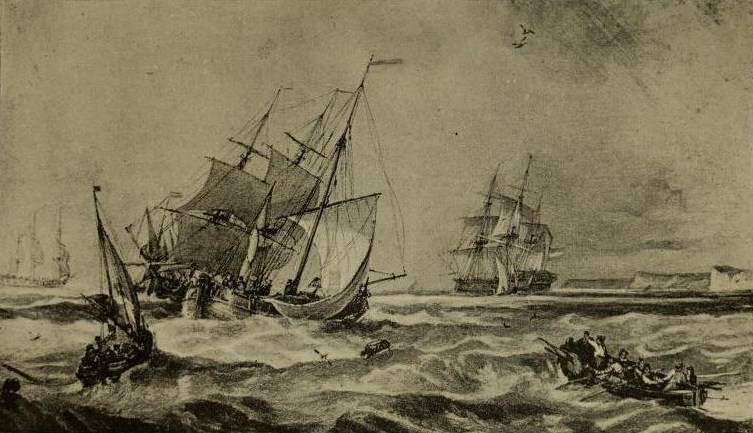
Dutch vessels (b/w illustration of the original)

Samuel Owen (1769? – 8 December 1857) was an English marine painter and illustrator.

== Life and works ==
Owen was born about 1769. Nothing is recorded of him before 1791, when he exhibited "A Sea View" at the Royal Academy. This was followed in 1797, after the victory of Cape St. Vincent, by "A View of the British and Spanish Fleets", and, in 1799, by three drawings of the engagement between HMS Director (under Captain Bligh) and Vryheid (Admiral De Winter) in the Battle of Camperdown on 11 October 1797. These, with three other drawings exhibited in 1802 and 1807, complete the number of his exhibits at the Royal Academy.

In 1808 he joined the "Associated Artists in Water-Colours", and sent eleven drawings of shipping and marine subjects to the first exhibition of that short-lived body. He also exhibited twelve works in 1809, and six in 1810, but after that date resigned his membership. His works were carefully drawn and freshly coloured, with great attention to the details of shipping. "Among them are the series of 84 drawings which were engraved by William Bernard Cooke for his work 'The Thames'", published in 1811, and eleven others made for the "Picturesque Tour of the River Thames", published by William Westall, R.A., and himself in 1838.

Owen died at Sunbury in Surrey, on 8 December 1857, in his 89th year, but had long before ceased to practise his art.

Other pictures (in the South Kensington Museum c. 1885) of his include : 'Shipping in a Calm,' 'Indiaman lying-to for a Pilot,' 'Luggers on the Shore,' and seven other river and sea pictures. A small half-length portrait of Owen in watercolours, signed 'Montague, 1805,' was in the possession of Dr. Edward H. <surname missing> of Lewisham High Road.
