= Edward Nathaniel Bancroft =

Edward Nathaniel Bancroft, M.D. (1772–1842) was an English physician, botanist, and zoologist, known for his writings on yellow fever.

== Life ==
Bancroft was the son of Edward Bancroft. He was born in London and received his schooling under Charles Burney and Samuel Parr. He entered St. John's College, Cambridge, and graduated bachelor of medicine in 1794.

In 1795 he was appointed a physician to the armed forces. He served in the Windward Islands, in Portugal, in the Mediterranean, and with Abercromby's expedition to Egypt in 1801. On his return to England he proceeded to the degree of M.D. in 1804, and began to practise as a physician in London, retaining half-pay rank in the army.

He joined the College of Physicians in 1805, became a fellow in 1806, was appointed to give the Gulstonian lectures the same year, and was made a censor in 1808, at the comparatively early ago of thirty-six; he was a pamphleteer against the pretensions of army surgeons. In 1808 he was appointed a physician to St George's Hospital.

In 1811 he gave up practice in London, owing to ill-health, and resumed his full-pay rank as physician to the forces, proceeding to Jamaica. He remained there for the rest of his life (thirty-one years), his ultimate rank being that of deputy inspector-general of army hospitals. He died at Kingston on 18 September 1842, in his seventy-first year; a mural tablet to his memory was placed in the cathedral church of Kingston 'by the physicians and surgeons of Jamaica'.

Like many naval physicians of his time, Dr Bancroft was a naturalist. The genus name Manta was first published in his paper On the fish known in Jamaica as the sea-devil, 1829.

== Works ==
Bancroft's earliest writings were two polemical pamphlets—"A Letter to the Commissioners of Military Enquiry, containing Animadversions on the Fifth Report", London, 1808, and "Exposure of Misrepresentations by Dr. McGrigor and Dr. Jackson to the Commissioners of Military Enquiry", London, 1808—on proposed changes in the army medical department in which he contended for the then existing artificial distinctions between physician to the forces and regimental surgeon, and for the precedence of the former. His opponents in the controversy were two army medical officers, James McGrigor and Robert Jackson. McGrigor charged Bancroft with want of accuracy, want of candour, and partiality. Jackson accused him of being "presumptuous in his professional rank, which he conceives to be superior to actual knowledge."

Bancroft's best title to be remembered in medicine is his "Essay on the Disease called Yellow Fever, with Observations concerning Febrile Contagion, Typhus Fever, Dysentery, and the Plague, partly delivered as the Gulstonian Lectures before the College of Phvsicians in the years 1806 and 1807", London, 1811, with a "Sequel" to the same, London, 1817. "Never," says Charles Murchison (Continued Fevers of Great Britain, 1st ed. 1862, p. 111), "has any work effected a greater revolution in professional opinion in this country." The spontaneous, autochthonous, or de novo origin of the contagia of pestilential diseases was then the generally accepted one, though the doctrine of the reproduction of a pathogen existing ab æterno had been stated, among others, by Alard Mauritius Eggerdes, a Prussian physician, for bubonic plague in 1720. Bancroft's skill in dialectic made the ab æterno doctrine popular. He argued, "There is no chance, nor even possibility, of thus generating anything so wonderful and so immutable as contagion, which, resembling animals and vegetables in the faculty of propagating itself, must, like them, have been the original work of our common Creator. ... As well might we revive the for-ever exploded doctrine of equivocal generation" (Essay, p. 109). Bancroft explained away facts vouched for by observers such as John Pringle, Donald Monro, and Gilbert Blane. Yellow fever, he also argued, should be identified as a malarial fever. Murchison stated that "the doctrine of Bancroft was generally adopted, without investigation of the facts upon which it was founded."
