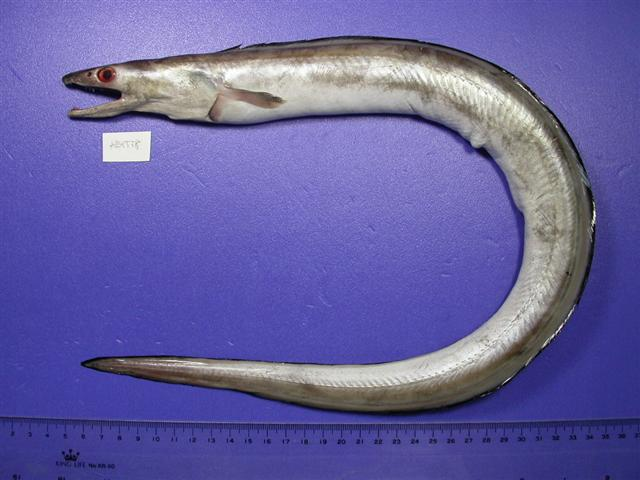
- Muraenesox cinereus

Scientific classification
- Kingdom: Animalia
- Phylum: Chordata
- Class: Actinopterygii
- Order: Anguilliformes
- Suborder: Congroidei
- Family: Muraenesocidae; Bleeker, 1864

Genera
- see text

= Muraenesocidae =

Family of fishes

The Muraenesocidae, or pike congers, are a small family of marine eels found worldwide in tropical and subtropical seas. Some species are known to enter brackish water.

Pike congers have cylindrical bodies, scaleless skin, narrow heads with large eyes, and strong teeth. Their dorsal fins start above the well-developed pectoral fins. These rather aggressive fish range from 60 to 250 cm (2.0 to 8.2 ft) in length.

== Genera ==
About 15 known species are recognized in 6 genera:

- Congresox Gill, 1890
- Cynoponticus Costa, 1845
- Muraenesox McClelland, 1843
- Oxyconger Bleeker, 1864
- Sauromuraenesox Alcock, 1889
