= France in the American Revolutionary War =

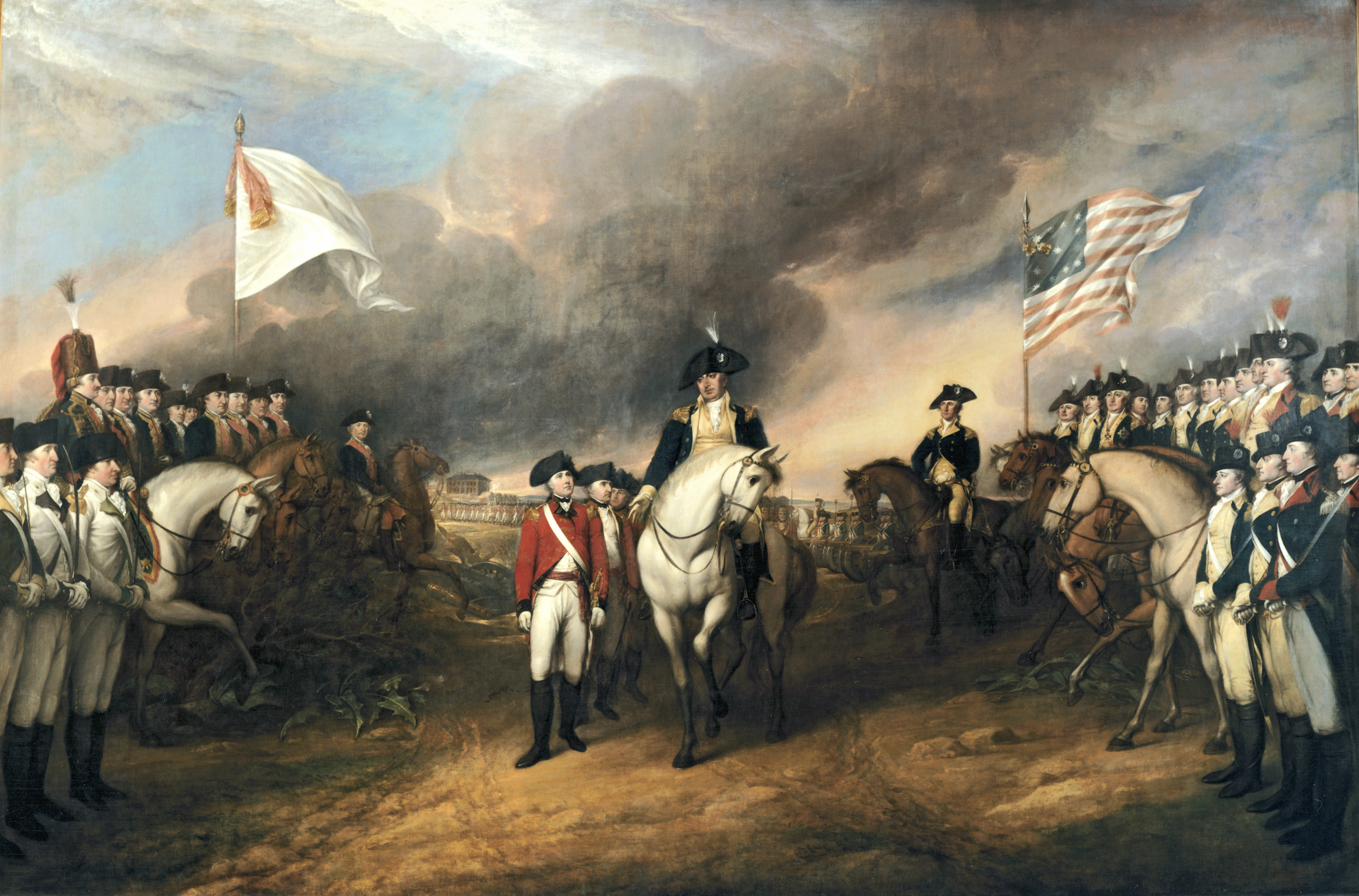
Surrender of Lord Cornwallis, a painting by American artist John Trumbull depicting Cornwallis and his army (center) surrendering to French (left) and American (right) troops, at the conclusion of the Siege of Yorktown in 1781.

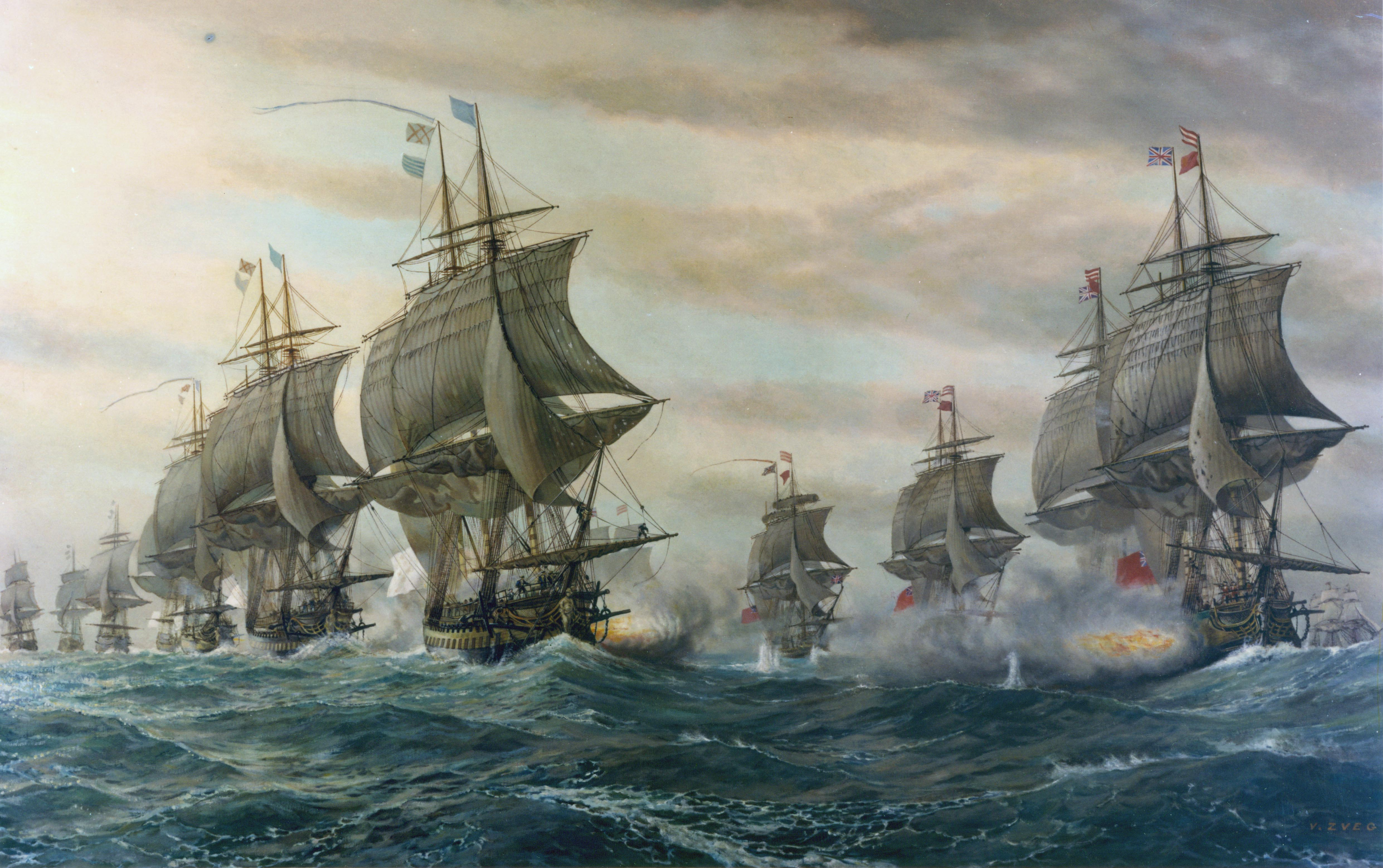
French (left) and British ships (right) at the Battle of the Chesapeake off Yorktown in 1781; the outnumbered British fleet was forced to withdraw as a result of the engagement, leaving Cornwallis no choice but to capitulate.

French involvement in the American Revolutionary War of 1775–1783 began in 1776 when the Kingdom of France secretly shipped supplies to the Continental Army of the Thirteen Colonies upon its establishment in June 1775. France was a rival of the Kingdom of Great Britain, from which the Thirteen Colonies were attempting to separate. Having lost its own North American colony to Britain in the Seven Years' War, France sought to weaken Britain by helping the American insurgents.

A Treaty of Alliance between the French and the Continental Army followed in 1778, which led to French money, matériel and troops being sent to the United States. An ignition of a global war with Britain started shortly thereafter. Subsequently, Spain and the Dutch Republic also began to send assistance, which, along with other political developments in Europe, left the British with no allies during the conflict (excluding the Hessian mercenaries). Spain openly declared war in 1779, joining the war as an ally of France as no formal treaty was brokered with the Americans; and war between the British and Dutch followed soon after.

France's direct help was a major and decisive contribution towards the United States' eventual victory and independence in the war. However, as a cost of participation in the war, France accumulated over 1 billion livres in debt, which significantly strained the nation's finances. The French government's failure to control spending (in combination with other factors) led to unrest in the nation, which eventually culminated in a revolution six years after the conflict between the US and Great Britain concluded. Relations between France and the United States thereafter deteriorated, leading to the Quasi-War in 1798.

== American origins of the conflict ==
After its defeat in the Seven Years' War in 1763, France lost all of its holdings in North America, but kept its sugar islands in the Caribbean. The Parliament of Great Britain sought to recoup revenue for the empty treasury from the Thirteen Colonies by directly levying a series of taxes, usurping what colonial assemblies saw as their traditional right. Some colonists saw Parliament as undermining their rights as free-born Englishmen now being treated as second-class subjects with no voice in Parliament, encapsulated in the political slogan "No taxation without representation". As part of that conflict over the right to tax, some colonists organized in 1774 the direct action of dumping taxed tea into Boston Harbor. The British government responded harshly by passing the Intolerable Acts, which included the closing of Boston Harbor and the revocation of Massachusetts's colonial charter. Other colonies saw these actions as a threat to their own rights and began to consider making common cause with the Massachusetts colony. This conflict exacerbated tensions further. The ideological conflict escalated into armed conflict in April 1775, at which point the delegates from almost all the colonies came together in the First Continental Congress to consider concerted action against British policy. France, which had been rebuilding its Navy and other forces after the previous disastrous defeat, began to see this American colonial unrest as a perfect opportunity to avenge her defeat in the previous war and severely undermine her nemesis.

== French involvement ==
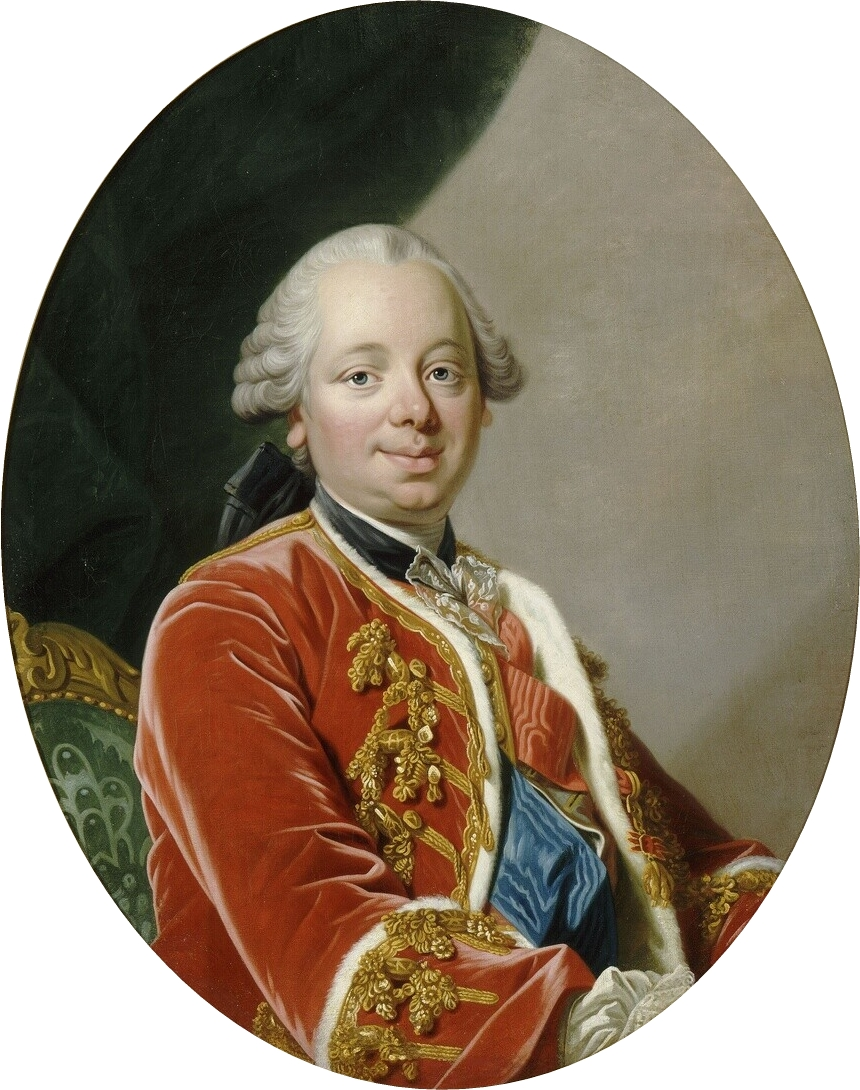
Choiseul actively reorganized the French army and navy for a future war of revenge against Britain.

France bitterly resented its loss in the Seven Years' War and sought revenge. It also wanted to strategically weaken Britain. Following the Declaration of Independence, the American Revolution was well received by both the general population and the aristocracy in France. The Revolution was perceived as the incarnation of the Enlightenment Spirit against the "English tyranny." Benjamin Franklin traveled to France in December 1776 in order to rally the nation's support, and he was welcomed with great enthusiasm. At first, French support was covert. French agents sent the Patriots military aid (predominantly gunpowder) through a company called Rodrigue Hortalez et Compagnie, beginning in the spring of 1776. Estimates place the percentage of French-supplied arms to the Americans in the Saratoga campaign at up to 90%. By 1777, over five million livres of aid had been sent to the American rebels.

Motivated by the prospect of glory in battle or animated by the sincere ideals of liberty and republicanism, volunteers such as Pierre Charles L'Enfant joined the American army. The most famous was the Marquis de Lafayette, a charming young aristocrat who defied Louis XVI's order and enlisted in 1777 at age 20. He became an aide to George Washington and a combat general. More importantly, he solidified a favorable American view of France. Kramer argues that Lafayette provided a legitimacy for the war and confidence that there was serious European support for independence. Lafayette's personal style was highly attractive; the young man learned quickly, adapted to the Patriot style, avoided politics, and became a fast friend of General Washington. Fifty years later, after a major career in French politics, he returned as a beloved hero of the war.

=== Debate over covert aid or declaring open war ===
Before open war between France and Britain, Pierre Beaumarchais was at the center of an arms traffic to support American Insurgents.

Up against the British power, the young nation lacked arms and allies, and so it turned towards France. France was not directly interested in the conflict, but saw it as an opportunity to contest British power by supporting a new British opponent. Through negotiations conducted first by Silas Deane and then by Benjamin Franklin, France began covert support of the patriots' cause.

Secretly approached by Louis XVI and France's foreign minister, the Charles Gravier, comte de Vergennes, Pierre Beaumarchais was authorized to sell gunpowder and ammunition to the Americans for close to a million livres under the veil of the French company Rodrigue Hortalez et Compagnie. The aid given by France, much of which passed through the neutral Dutch West Indies port of Sint Eustatius, contributed to George Washington's survival against the British onslaught in 1776 and 1777. The aid was also a major factor in the defeat of General John Burgoyne's expedition in the Champlain corridor that ended in a British disaster at Saratoga. French ports accommodated American ships, including privateers and Continental Navy warships, that acted against British merchant ships. France also provided at least one warship, Bonhomme Richard, financed by French businessman Jacques-Donatien Le Ray and put under the command of John Paul Jones. France provided significant economic aid, either as donations or loans, and also offered technical assistance, granting some of its military strategists "vacations" so they could assist American troops.

Silas Deane, appointed by the Americans and helped by French animosity towards Britain, obtained unofficial aid, starting in early 1776. However, the goal was the total involvement of France in the war. A new delegation composed of Franklin, Deane, and Arthur Lee, was appointed to lobby for the involvement of European nations. The British paid Edward Bancroft and Paul Wentworth to spy on them. Franklin, age 70 and already well known in French intellectual circles for his scientific discoveries, served as the chief diplomat with the title of "minister" (the term "ambassador" was not used). He dressed in rough frontier clothes rather than formal court dress, and met with many leading diplomats, aristocrats, intellectuals, scientists and financiers. Franklin's image and writings caught the French imagination – there were many images of him sold on the market – and he became the image of the archetypal new American and a hero for aspirations for a new order inside France. When the international climate at the end of 1777 had become tenser, Habsburg Austria requested the support of France in the War of the Bavarian Succession against the Prussians in line with the Franco-Austrian Alliance. France refused, causing the relationship with Austria to turn sour. Under these conditions, asking Austria to assist France in a war against the British was impossible. Attempts to rally Spain also failed: Spain did not immediately recognize potential gains, and the American revolutionary spirit was seen as threatening the legitimacy of the Spanish Crown in its own vast American colonies that stretched the hemisphere.

Public opinion in France was in favor of open war, but King Louis and his advisors were reluctant due to the possible risks and heavy expenses involved. The King's economic and military advisors, in particular, remained reluctant. The French Navy was being rapidly rebuilt, but there were doubts as to how ready it was for serious conflict. Financiers Anne Robert Jacques Turgot and Jacques Necker warned war would be very expensive for France's wobbly system of taxation and finance.

The Americans argued that an alliance of the United States, France, and Spain would assure a rapid defeat of the British, but Vergennes, waiting until his navy was ready, hesitated. On July 23, 1777, Vergennes decided that it was time to decide either total assistance, with war, or abandonment of the new nation. The choice, ratified by the King, was war.

=== Entry into the war ===
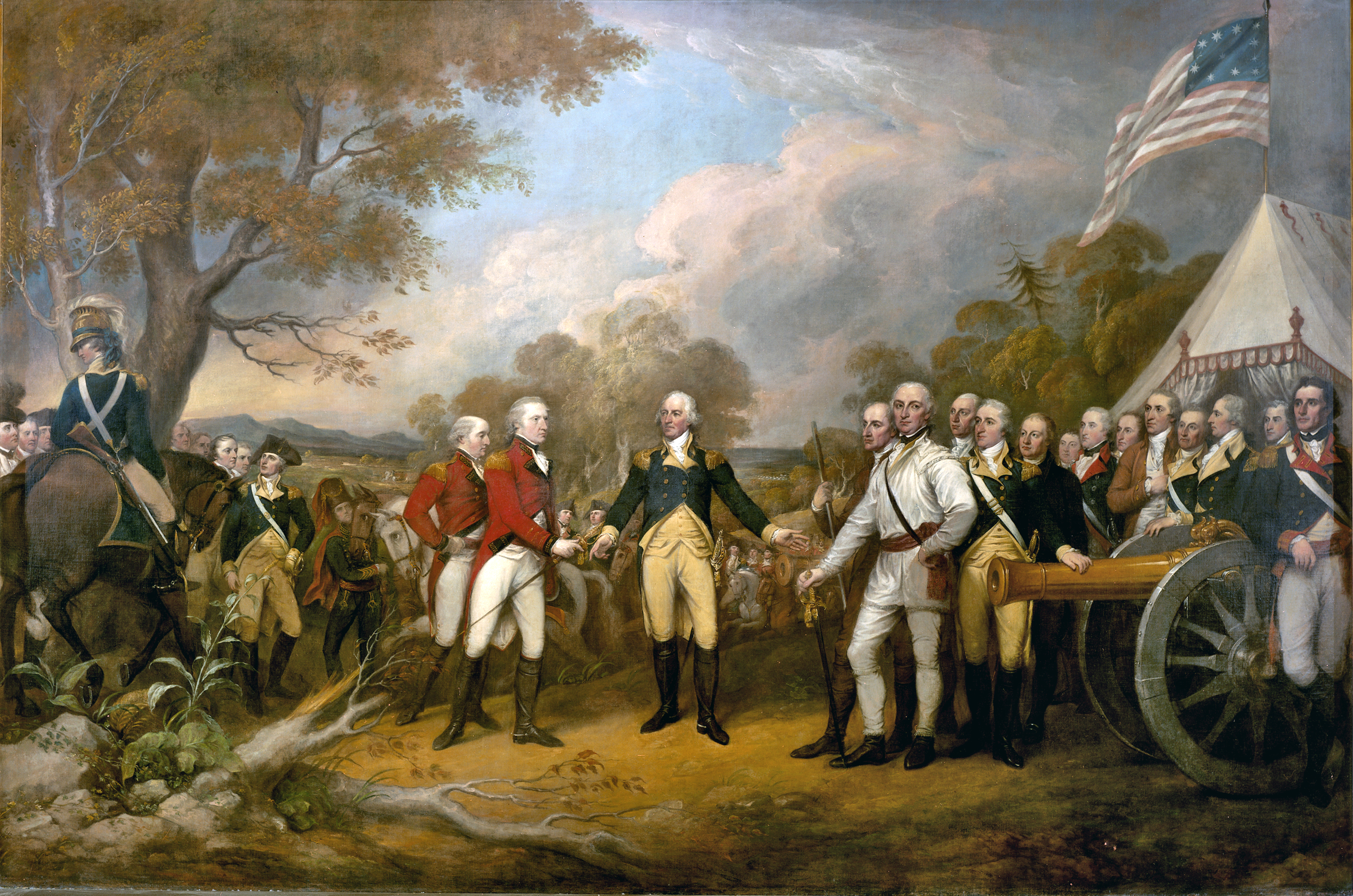
Surrender of General Burgoyne at the Battle of Saratoga, by John Trumbull, 1822

The British had taken Philadelphia in 1777, but American victory at the Battle of Saratoga brought back hope to the Patriots and enthusiasm in France. The army of Burgoyne surrendered to American forces after Saratoga and France realized that the United States could be victorious. The King directed Vergennes to negotiate an alliance with the Americans.

France formally recognized the United States on February 6, 1778, with the signing of the Treaty of Alliance. Hostilities soon followed after Britain declared war on France on March 17, 1778. The British naval force, then the largest fleet afloat, and French fleet confronted each other from the beginning. The British avoided intercepting a French fleet that left Toulon under Charles Henri Hector, Count of Estaing in April for North America, fearing the French fleet at Brest might then be used to launch an invasion of Britain. France had kept the Brest fleet to protect commercial shipping in European waters, and it sailed out only after a British fleet was confirmed to have left in pursuit of d'Estaing, thus weakening the British Channel Fleet. In spite of this reduction, the British fleet still outnumbered the French fleet at Brest, and Admiral d'Orvilliers was instructed to avoid combat when he sailed in July. D'Orvilliers met the fleet of Admiral Augustus Keppel in the indecisive Battle of Ushant on July 27, after which both fleets returned to port for repairs.

France did consider the landing of 40,000 men in the nearby British Isles but abandoned the idea because of logistical issues. On the continent, France was protected through its alliance with Austria which, even if it did not take part in the American Revolutionary War, affirmed its diplomatic support of France.

Other nations in Europe at first refused to openly join the war but both Spain and the Dutch Republic gave unofficial support to the American cause. Vergennes was able to convince the Spanish to formally enter the war in 1779 and, in 1780, Britain declared war on the Dutch Republic over claims of Dutch violations of neutrality.

=== North American operations ===
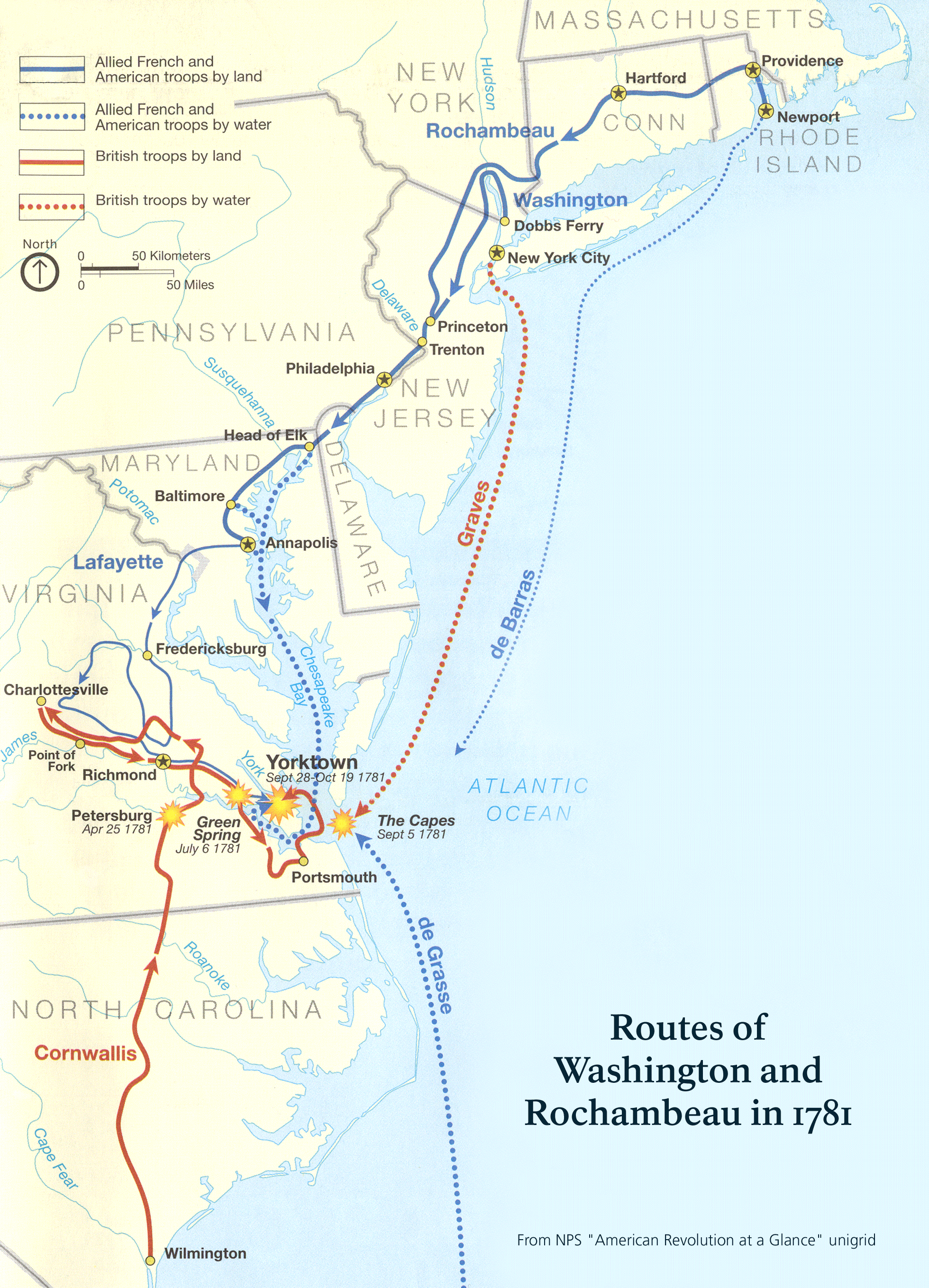
Franco-American routes during the Yorktown campaign.

French participation in North America was initially maritime in nature and marked by some indecision on the part of its military leaders. In 1778, American and French planners organized an attempt to capture Newport, Rhode Island, then under British occupation. The attempt failed, in part because Admiral d'Estaing did not land French troops prior to sailing out of Narragansett Bay to meet the British fleet. He then sailed to Boston after his fleet was damaged in a storm. In 1779, d'Estaing again led his fleet to North America for joint operations, this time against British-held Savannah, Georgia. About 3,000 French joined with 2,000 Americans in the Siege of Savannah, in which a naval bombardment was unsuccessful. An attempted assault of the entrenched British position was repulsed with heavy losses.

Support became more notable when, in 1780, 6,000 soldiers led by Jean-Baptiste Donatien de Vimeur, comte de Rochambeau landed at Newport, itself abandoned in 1779 by the British, and then established a naval base there. These forces were largely inactive since the fleet was closely watched by the British fleet from its bases in New York and eastern Long Island. By early 1781, with the war dragging on, French military planners were finally convinced that more significant operations would be required in North America to bring a decisive end to the war. That year's West Indies fleet was commanded by François Joseph Paul de Grasse, and specific arrangements were made to coordinate operations with him. De Grasse asked to be supplied with North American pilots and to be informed of possible operations in North America to which he might contribute. Rochambeau and Washington met in Wethersfield, Connecticut in May 1781 to discuss their options. Washington wanted to drive the British from both New York City and Virginia (the latter led first by Benedict Arnold, then by Brigadier William Phillips and eventually by Charles Cornwallis). Virginia was also seen as a potent threat that could be fought with naval assistance. These two options were dispatched to the Caribbean along with the requested pilots. Rochambeau, in a separate letter, urged de Grasse to come to the Chesapeake Bay for operations in Virginia. Following the Wethersfield conference, Rochambeau moved his army to White Plains, New York and placed his command under Washington.

De Grasse received these letters in July at roughly the same time Cornwallis was preparing to occupy Yorktown, Virginia. De Grasse concurred with Rochambeau and subsequently sent a dispatch indicating that he would reach the Chesapeake at the end of August but that agreements with the Spanish meant he could only stay until mid-October. The arrival of his dispatches prompted the Franco-American army to begin a march for Virginia. De Grasse reached the Chesapeake as planned and his troops were sent to assist Lafayette's army in the blockade of Cornwallis's army. A British fleet sent to confront de Grasse's control of the Chesapeake was defeated by the French on September 5 at the Battle of the Chesapeake and the Newport fleet delivered the French siege train to complete the allied military arrival. The Siege of Yorktown and following surrender by Cornwallis on October 19 were decisive in ending major hostilities in North America.

=== Other battles ===
The Battle of the Saints, 12 April 1782

Other important battles between the French and the British were spaced out around the world, from the West Indies to India. France's navy at first dominated in the West Indies, capturing Dominica, Grenada, Saint Vincent, Tobago but losing St. Lucia at the beginning of the war. After the siege of Yorktown the French returned to the West Indies and were successful in taking St. Kitts (despite a naval defeat), Montserrat as well as Demerara and Essequibo in South America by February 1782. A planned Franco-Spanish invasion of Jamaica was aborted after the decisive Battle of the Saintes in 1782. This put French forces on the defensive in the Caribbean although the French captured the Turks and Caicos Islands at the end of the war.

In European waters, France and Spain joined forces with the entry of Spain into the war in 1779. An attempted invasion of Britain was a failure due to a variety of factors. Two attempted French invasions of Jersey in 1779 and 1781 ended in defeat. French and Spanish forces captured Minorca in February 1782 but the Great Siege of Gibraltar the largest operation of the war from 1779 to 1783, was unsuccessful in either storming the place, or preventing repeated British relief of its garrison.

In India, British troops gained control of French outposts in 1778 and 1779, sparking the Kingdom of Mysore, a longtime French ally, to begin the Second Anglo-Mysore War. Allied with the French, the Mysoreans for a time threatened British positions on the east coast. A French fleet commanded by the Bailli de Suffren fought a series of largely inconclusive battles with a British fleet under Sir Edward Hughes, and the only major military land action, the 1783 Siege of Cuddalore, was cut short by news that a preliminary peace had been signed. The French failed to attain their goal of regaining territories in India that were lost in the Seven Years' War. The British fought on with Mysore until that conflict ended as status quo ante bellum in 1784.

=== Peace negotiations ===
Because of decisive battles on American soil, the French were in a strong position during the peace negotiations in Paris at the beginning of 1782. Rodney's victory at the Battle of the Saintes back in April however changed all that – news of the French defeat arrived nearly six weeks later in France and was met with dismay. The defeat was costly militarily and financially. The Royal Navy now had the strategic initiative, and as a result British demands at the peace talks greatly strengthened. France was also approaching the limits of its ability to borrow money and now sought a quick end to the war. The defeat also signalled a collapse in the Franco-American alliance – as a result Benjamin Franklin never informed France of the secret negotiations that took place directly between Britain and the United States.

The British position was strengthened even more in September with the failure of the Franco-Spanish assault on Gibraltar and the garrison's relief by the Royal Navy the following month. A preliminary peace treaty between Great Britain and America was signed on 30 November; Britain acknowledged that the United States owned all the land south of the Great Lakes and east of the Mississippi River, except for Florida (which was returned to Spain). The French accepted the preliminary with protests but no action. Since France was not included in the American-British peace discussions, the influence of France and Spain in future negotiations was limited.

== Aftermath ==
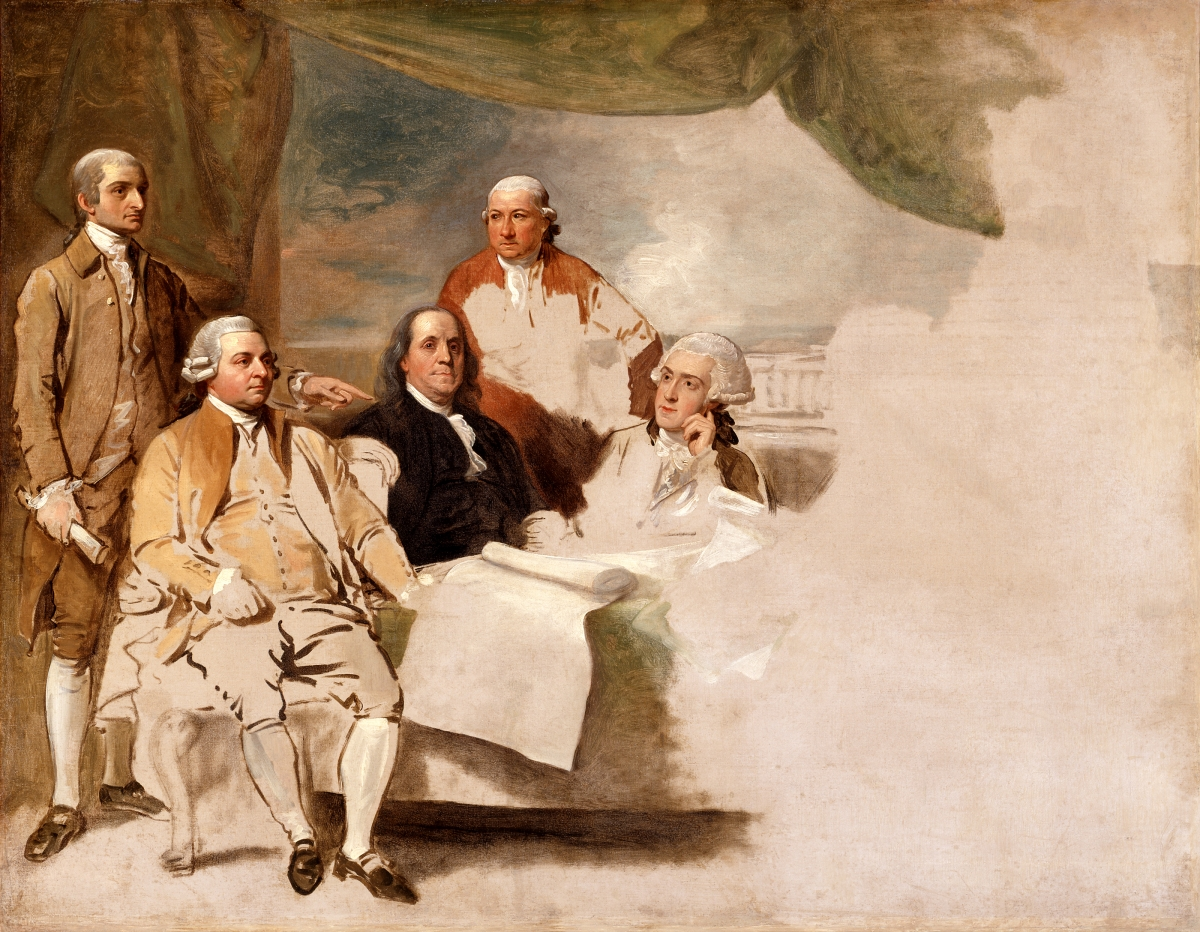
Treaty of Paris, by Benjamin West (1783), shows the American delegation to the 1783 Treaty of Paris. The British delegation refused to pose for the painting.

With the Americans split from their allies the war formally ended in September 1783 with the signing of the Treaty of Paris. Losses from the 1763 Treaty of Paris and the Treaty of Utrecht (1713) were not regained. All territories that were captured by the powers were returned except for Tobago and a part of the Senegal River area which were acquired by France who also gained some concessions in the Newfoundland fisheries. Spain managed better having regained Florida and Minorca, but Gibraltar remained in the hands of the British.

Because the French involvement in the war was distant and naval in nature, over a billion livres tournois were spent by the French government to support the war effort, raising its overall debt to about 3.315 billion. The finances of the French state were in disastrous shape and were made worse by Jacques Necker, who, rather than increase taxes, used loans to pay off debts. State secretary of Finances Charles Alexandre de Calonne attempted to fix the deficit problem by asking for the taxation of the property of nobles and clergy but was dismissed and exiled for his ideas. The French instability further weakened the reforms that were essential in the re-establishment of stable French finances. Trade also severely declined during the war, but was revived by 1783.

The war was especially important for the prestige and pride of France, who was reinstated in the role of European arbiter. However, Great Britain, not France, became the leading trading partner of the United States. The French took pride in their cultural influence on the young country through the Enlightenment, as attested by Franklin and Thomas Jefferson, and as embodied in the Declaration of Independence in 1776 and the United States Constitution in 1787. In turn, the Revolution influenced France. Liberal elites were satisfied by the victory but there were also some major consequences. European conservative Royalists and nobility had become nervous, and began to take measures in order to secure their positions. On May 22, 1781, the Decree of Ségur closed the military post offices of the upper rank to the common persons, reserving those ranks exclusively for the nobility.

=== Financial aspects ===
In all the French spent 1.3 billion livres to support the Americans directly in addition to the money it spent fighting Britain on land and sea outside the U.S.

France's status as a great modern power was re-affirmed by the war, but it was detrimental to the country's finances. Even though France's European territories were not affected, victory in a war against Great Britain with battles like the decisive siege of Yorktown in 1781 had a large financial cost which severely degraded fragile finances and increased the national debt. France gained little except that it supposedly weakened its main strategic enemy and gained a new, fast-growing ally that could become a welcome trading partner. However, the trade never materialized, Britain's economy grew spectacularly as a result of the Industrial Revolution and in 1793 the United States proclaimed its neutrality in the war between Great Britain and the French Republic.

Some historians argue that France primarily sought revenge against Great Britain for the loss of territory in North America and India from the previous conflict. But Jonathan R. Dull states that France intervened because of dispassionate calculation, not because of Anglophobia or a desire to avenge the loss of Canada.

== See also ==
- Charles Armand Tuffin, marquis de la Rouërie
- Armand Louis de Gontaut
- Pedro Pablo Abarca de Bolea, 10th Count of Aranda
- Benjamin Franklin Bache
- Edward Bancroft
- William Carmichael
- Jacques-Donatien Le Ray de Chaumont
- Anne Emmanuel de Croÿ
- Jacques Barbeu-Dubourg
- Edward Edwards, British spy
- Franco-American alliance
- William Franklin
- William Temple Franklin
- Conrad Alexandre Gérard de Rayneval
- Rodolphe-Ferdinand Grand, banker, along with his brother Georges, to America
- Anne-Catherine de Ligniville, Madame Helvétius
- Ralph Izard
- John Jay
- John Paul Jones
- Anne-César de La Luzerne
- Louis-Léon de Brancas, comte de Lauraguais
- Henry Laurens
- John Laurens
- Antoine Lavoisier
- Jean-Charles-Pierre Lenoir
- Jean-Baptiste Le Roy
- Louis-Guillaume Le Veillard
- List of French units in the American Revolutionary War
- Jean-Frédéric Phélypeaux, comte de Maurepas
- André Morellet
- Antoine de Sartine
- David Murray, 2nd Earl of Mansfield, The Viscount Stormont
- Paul Wentworth
- Lambert Wickes
- Influence of the American Revolution on the French Revolution
- Spain and the American Revolutionary War
