= Franco-American alliance =

Alliance between the Kingdom of France and the United States

Left image: Royal Standard of the Kingdom of France.
Right image: Flag of the United States from 1777 to 1795.

The Franco-American alliance was the 1778 military pact between the Kingdom of France and the United States during the American War of Independence. Formalized in the 1778 Treaty of Alliance, it was a military pact in which the French provided many supplies for the Americans in their conflict with France's rival Great Britain. The Dutch Republic and Spain later joined as allies of France, while Britain had no major European allies during the conflict. The French alliance began to materialize after the American forces captured a British army at Saratoga in October 1777, demonstrating the viability of the American cause.

Although France had played a significant role in the Americans' achievement of independence, the U.S. backed away from the alliance after 1793, when Revolutionary France declared war on Great Britain. The U.S. declared itself neutral. Relations between France and the United States worsened when the U.S. became closer to Britain, signing the Jay Treaty of 1795, leading to an undeclared Quasi-War. The alliance was entirely defunct by 1794 and formally ended in 1800.

== Background ==
France had been left deeply humiliated by the Britain's victory in the Seven Years' War. From 1763 onwards, France and its ally, Spain, began to rebuild their navies, prepare for a future war, and construct an alliance to fight a war of revenge against Britain. As the troubles in Britain's American colonies intensified during the 1760s and eventually led to open rebellion against the British in 1775, France began to anticipate the American rebels joining such an alliance.

In September 1775, the Continental Congress described foreign assistance as "undoubtedly attainable" and began to seek supplies and assistance from European powers hostile to Britain. The French leadership sought the "humiliation of England" and began giving covert aid to the rebels. The United States Declaration of Independence was advocated by some as necessary to secure European support against Britain. Silas Deane, an American envoy in Paris, proposed a major anti-British alliance and French invasions of Hanover and Portugal, both of which were allies of Britain.

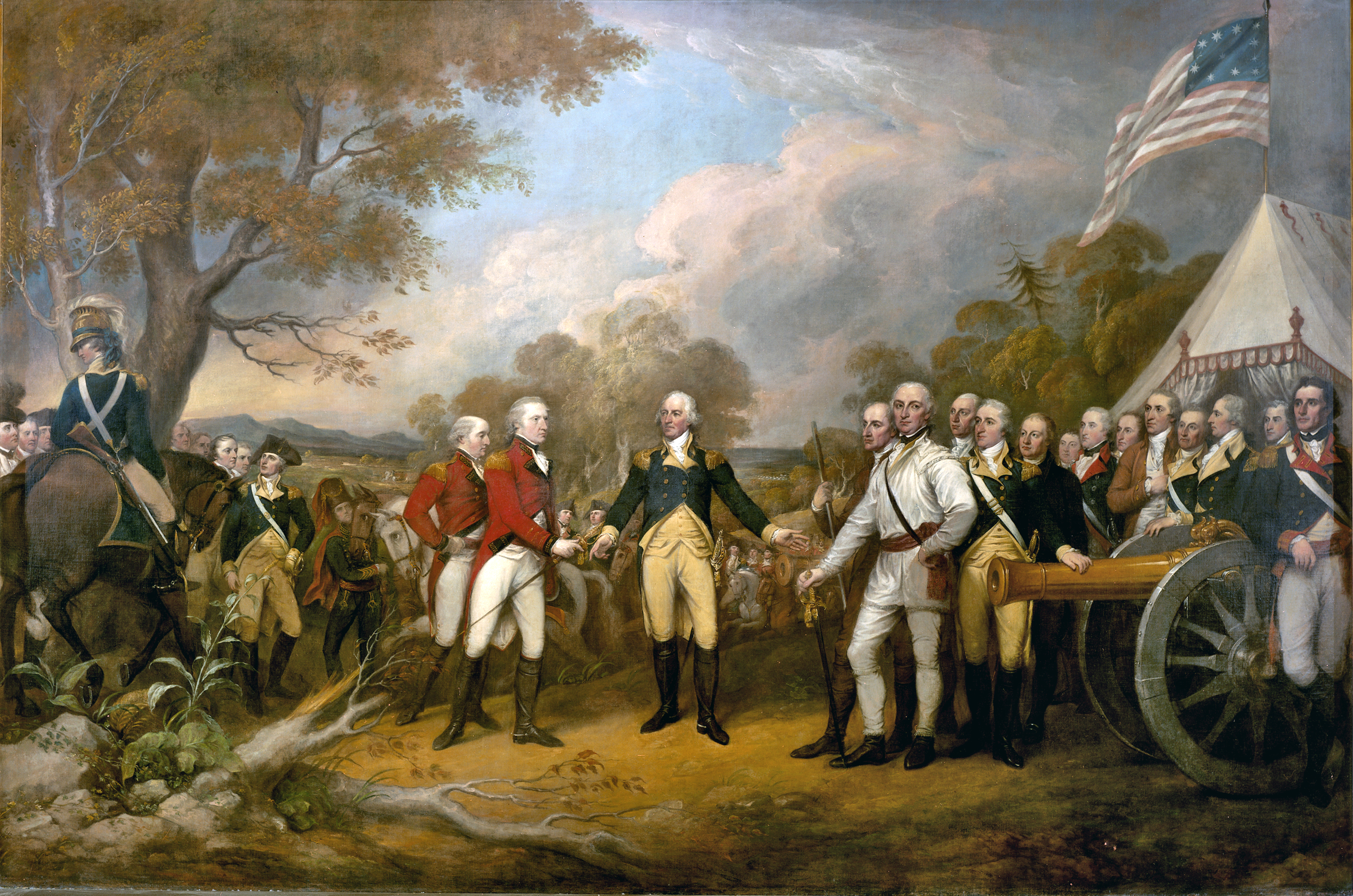
Surrender of General Burgoyne by John Trumbull (1821) shows General Daniel Morgan in front of a French de Vallière 4-pounder

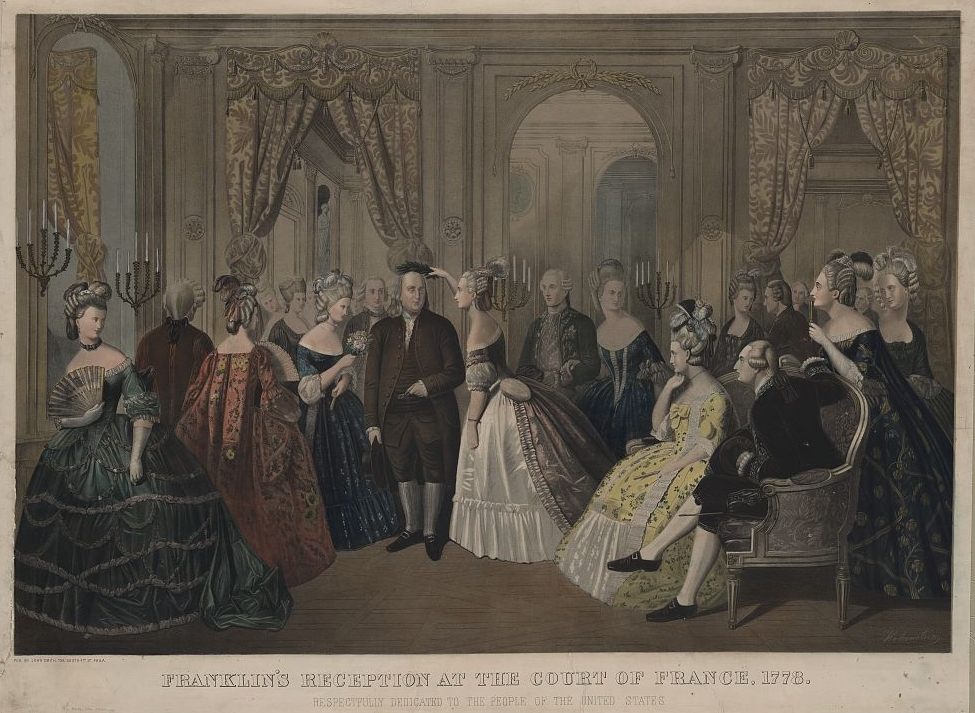
Benjamin Franklin's reception at the Court of France in 1778

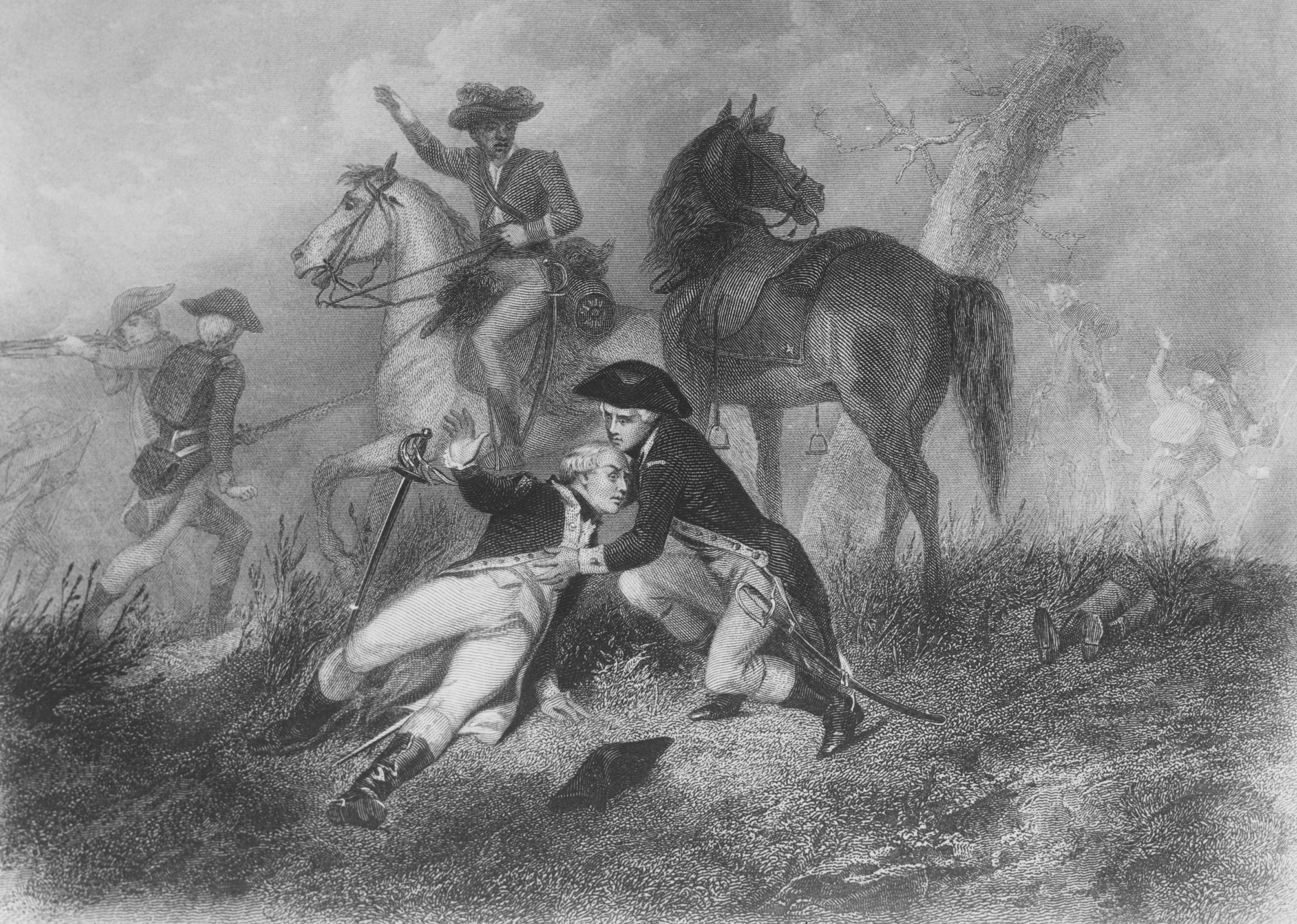
Lafayette wounded at the Battle of Brandywine in September 1777

The alliance was promoted in the United States by Thomas Jefferson, a Francophile. Based on the Model Treaty of 1776, Jefferson encouraged the role of France as an economic and military partner to the United States to weaken British influence. In 1776, Latouche Tréville transferred ammunition from France to the United States. Numerous French supplies as well as guns of the de Valliere type were used in the American War of Independence, especially the smaller 4-pounder field guns. The guns were shipped from France, and the field carriages provided for in the United States. The guns played an important role in such battles as the Battle of Saratoga, and the Siege of Yorktown. George Washington wrote about the supplies and guns in a letter to General Heath on 2 May 1777:

I was this morning favored with yours containing the pleasing accounts of the late arrivals at Portsmouth and Boston. That of the French ships of war, with artillery and other military stores, is most valuable. It is my intent to have all the arms that were not immediately wanted by the Eastern States, to be removed to Springfield, as a much safer place than Portsmouth... I shall also write Congress and press the immediate removal of the artillery, and other military stores from Portsmouth. I would also have you forward the twenty-five chests of arms lately arrived from Martinico to Springfield.

— George Washington letter to General Heath, 2 May 1777.

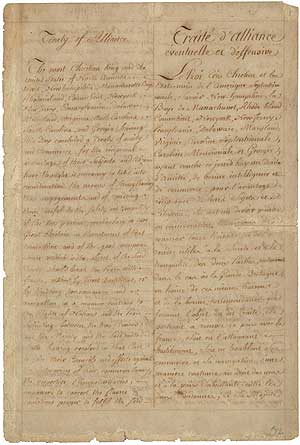
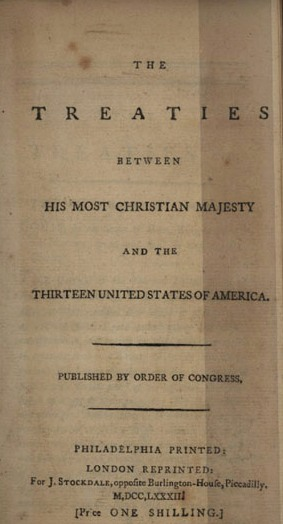
Left image: Original Franco-American treaty, signed 6 February 1778 Right image: Text of the 1778 Franco-American treaty, in a 1782 publication.

On 13 June 1777, Gilbert du Motier, Marquis de Lafayette, reached America and joined Washington in the Continental Army as a major general. He participated to the Battle of Brandywine, where he was wounded, and he later served at the Battle of Rhode Island. Lafayette would later return to France during the war to advocate more support for the American cause.

== Treaty of Alliance ==
The alliance was formally negotiated by Benjamin Franklin, but it progressed slowly until after news of the American victory at the Battle of Saratoga arrived in France. On February 6, 1778, two treaties were signed. The first, the Franco-American Treaty of Amity and Commerce, recognized the independence of the United States and established commercial relations between them; the second treaty, the 1778 Treaty of Alliance was a military alliance and signed immediately thereafter as insurance in case fighting with Britain erupted as a result of signing the commercial treaty. The alliance the gave open support from the French Army, Navy, and Treasury and stated that the United States had to guarantee "from the present time and forever, against all other powers (...) the present Possessions of the Crown of France in America," in exchange for a promise not to increase French possessions anywhere in America.

== Operations ==
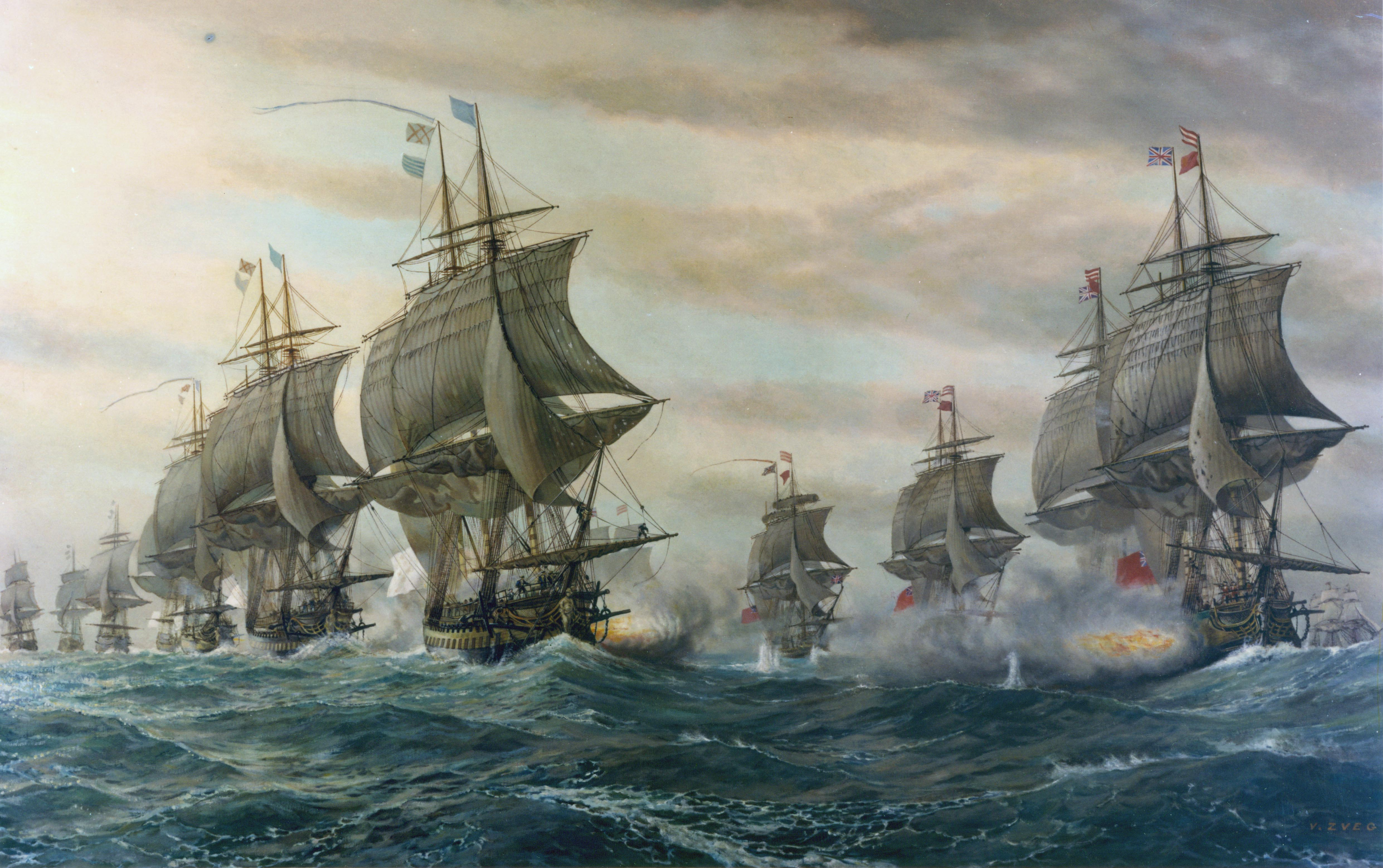
French Navy ships of the line in the Battle of the Chesapeake, 1781.

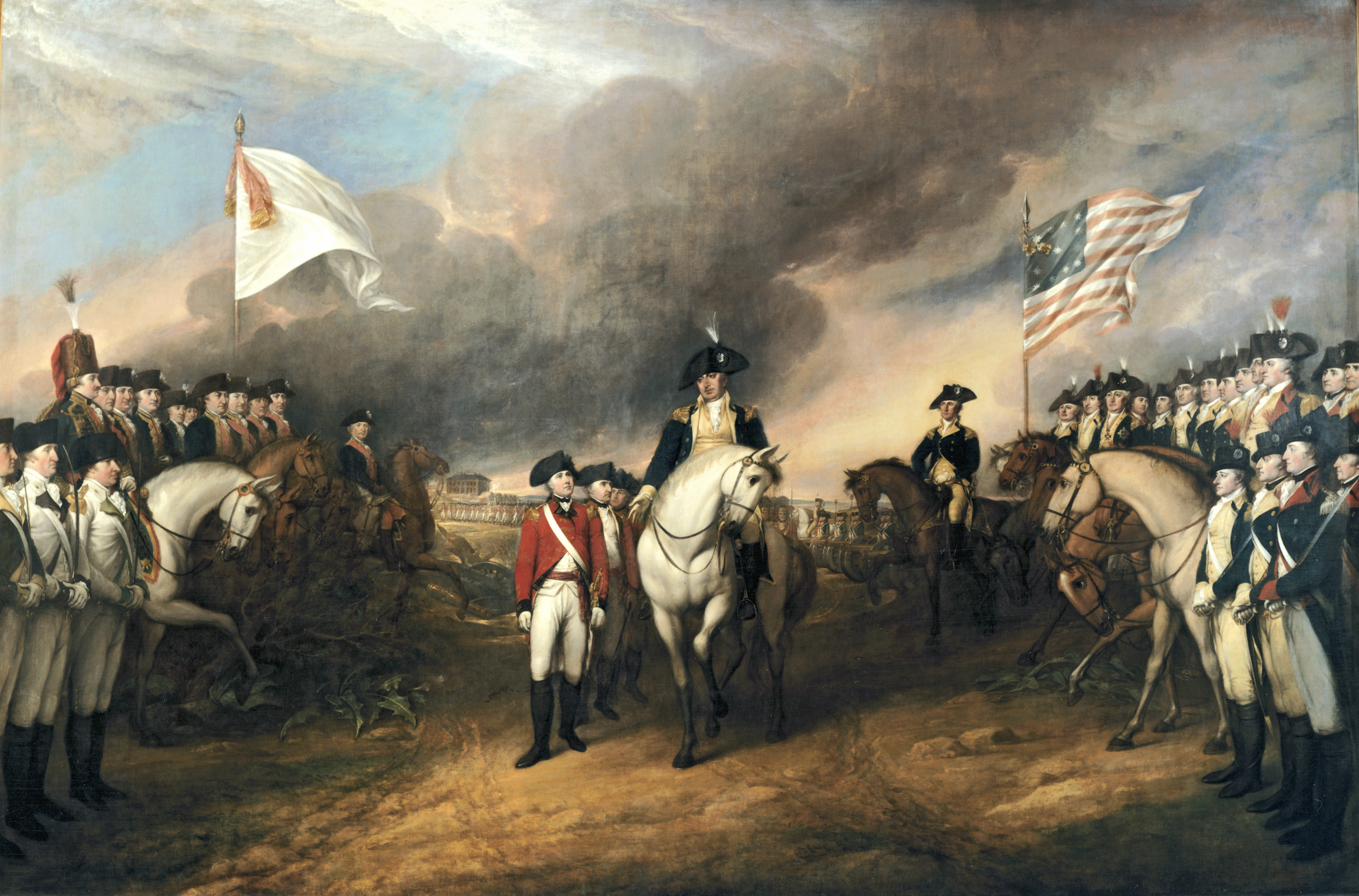
Surrender of Lord Cornwallis to French troops (left) and American troops (right), at the Battle of Yorktown in 1781.

=== European front ===
Naval conflict started in European waters with the First Battle of Ushant in July 1778, and continued with the ultimately unrealized Franco-Spanish invasion of Britain by the Armada of 1779.

=== 1st American Campaign ===
In the summer of 1778, French Admiral Charles Henri Hector, Count of Estaing arrived with a fleet and infantry reinforcements for the war with a fleet of twelve ships of the line and fourteen frigates. After declining to attack Richard Howe's inferior naval force outside New York, the French fleet sailed to Rhode Island where they were to take part in an attack on Newport.

On 6 July 1779, he successfully fought the Battle of Grenada against Admiral John Byron, but was defeated at the September 1779 siege of Savannah before returning to France. Actions continued in April 1780 with Guichen against Admiral Rodney in the Battle of Martinique.

=== 2nd American Campaign ===
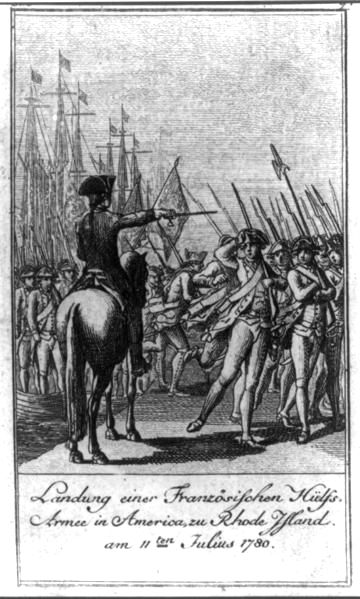
Landing of a French auxiliary army in Newport, Rhode Island on July 11, 1780, under the command of Comte de Rochambeau.

In 1780, Rochambeau arrived with a fleet and 6,000 French troops to join the Continental Army, under George Washington, in the "Expédition Particulière", landing in Newport, Rhode Island, on 10 July. Among de Rochambeau's officers was Major General François-Jean de Beauvoir, Marquis de Chastellux, known simply as François-Jean de Chastellux who had very good English. He served as an important liaison between General Washington and de Rochambeau, becoming a close, lifelong friend of both Lafayette (whose wife Adrienne de Noailles was his cousin), and Washington, and published books of letters and travels. Other notable French officers were Major General Charles du Houx, Marquis of Vioménil and Lieutenant Colonel Jean-Baptiste Antoine de Verger who made water colour sketches of the campaign.

In the Ohio valley, French Americans would also combine with Native American troops, as in the Battle of Kekionga in 1780 under Augustin de La Balme.

In July 1781, skirmish known as “The Action at Tarrytown” took place on the Hudson River. That night, a French unit from the Soissonnais Regiment, reinforced by American troops of the 2nd Continental Light Dragoons, successfully repelled British ships attacking American supply sloops anchored at Tarrytown, New York. It was the first combined combat operation of the Franco-American alliance in the Revolutionary War.

The French Navy played a decisive role in supporting the American side, as American forces could hardly confront the powerful Royal Navy. The French under de Grasse repulsed a British fleet at the Battle of the Chesapeake in 1781, thus ensuring that the Franco-American ground forces would win the ongoing siege of Yorktown, the last major land battle of the Revolutionary War, against Lord Cornwallis. Cornwallis' army surrendered to American and French forces at Yorktown in 1781. In the famous painting of the Surrender of Lord Cornwallis by John Trumbull, the 14 French officers portrayed are, left to right:

1. Count Deux-Ponts, Colonel of French Infantry
2. Duke de Laval Montmorency, Colonel of French Infantry
3. Count Custine, Colonel of French Infantry
4. Duke de Lauzun, Colonel of French Cavalry
5. General Choizy
6. Viscount Vioménil Field Marshall of France
7. Colonel de Rouvroy, Le Marquis de St. Simon Montbléru
8. Count Fersen, Aide-de-camp of Count Rochambeau
9. Duke Charles Damas, Aide-de-camp of Count Rochambeau
10. Major General the Marquis de Chastellux
11. Charles Gabriel de Vioménil
12. Count de Barras, Admiral
13. Count de Grasse, Admiral
14. Count Rochambeau, General in Chief of the French forces.

France continued to fight against the British in the 1782 Antilles War.

== Campaign in India ==
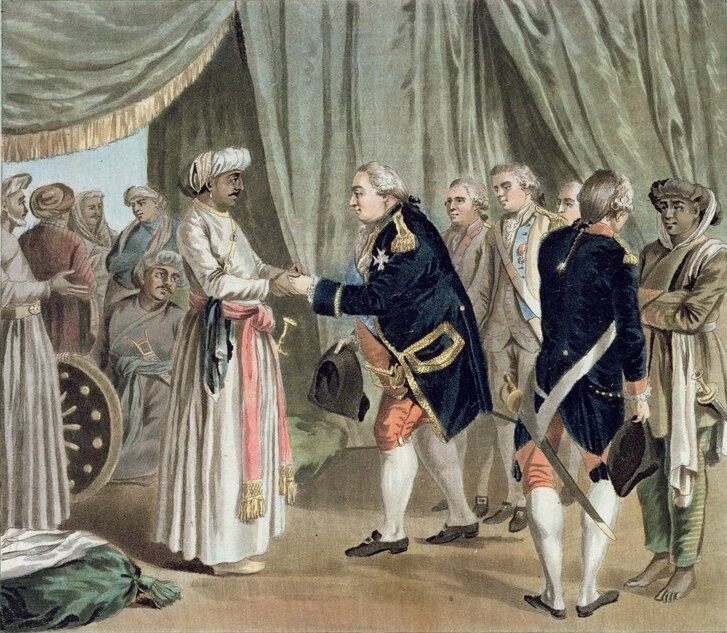
Suffren with Indian ally Hyder Ali in 1782.

France also carried out a campaign against British possessions in India during the Revolutionary War. In 1782, Louis XVI formed an alliance with Peshwa Madhavrao II. A French fleet under Pierre André de Suffren was sent to India with the purpose of attacking British targets there. Between February 1782 and June 1783, Suffren's fleet fought five fleet actions with a British fleet under Admiral Sir Edward Hughes off the coasts of India and Ceylon. Suffren also participated in land operations alongside the army of the Kingdom of Mysore. These battles included the Battle of Sadras on February 17, 1782, the Battle of Providien on April 12 near Trincomalee, the Battle of Negapatam on July 6 off Cuddalore, the capture of Trincomalee on 1 September, the capture of Cuddalore in late 1782 and finally the Battle of Trincomalee took place near that port on September 3. Though Suffren had not gained any significant victories when the war ended in 1783, he had captured several richly-laden British East Indiamen and returned to France a wealthy man.

== Aftermath ==
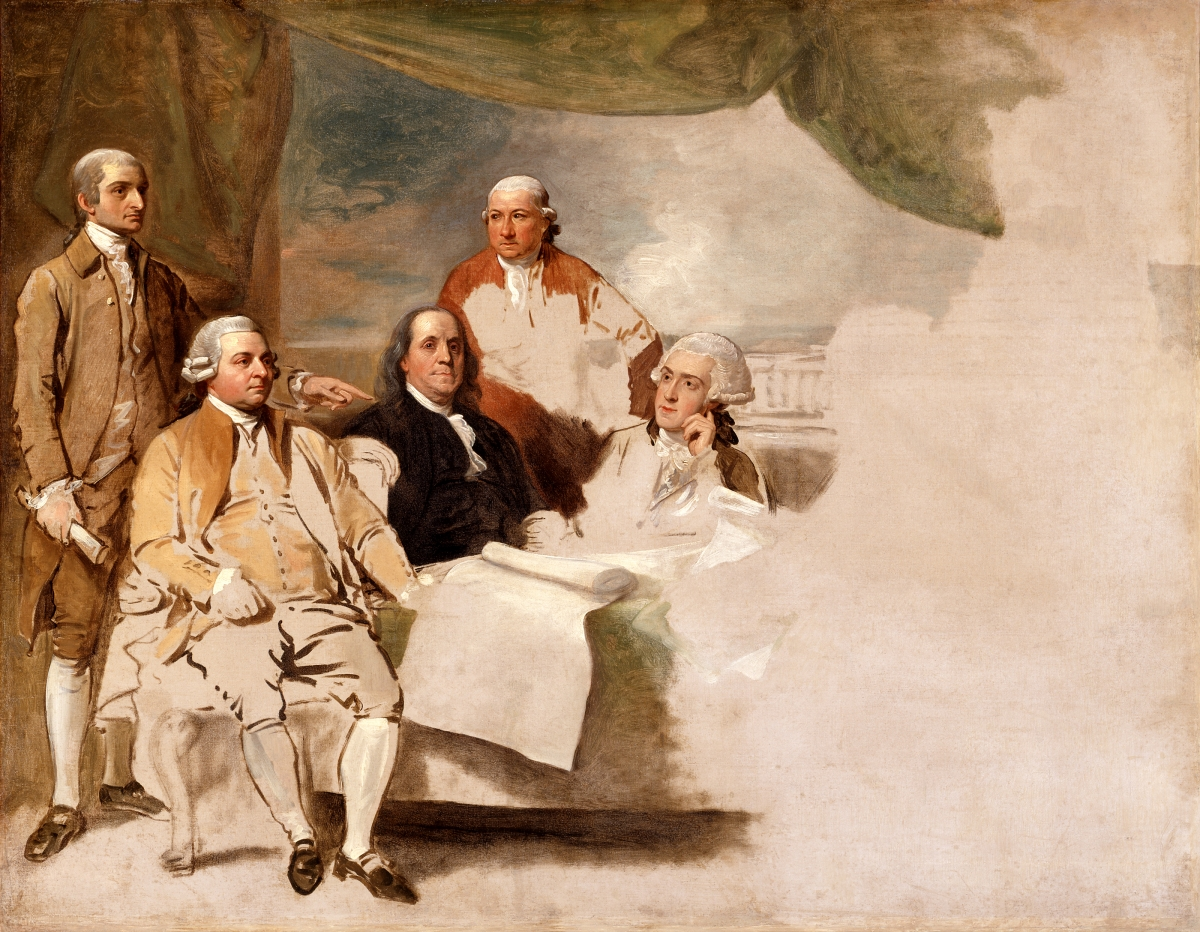
Treaty of Paris, by Benjamin West (1783), portrays the American delegation at the 1783 Treaty of Paris. The British delegation refused to pose, and the painting was never completed.

Finally, the Treaty of Paris was signed on 3 September 1783, establishing British recognition of American independence and ending the hostilities. The 1778 Treaty of Alliance, promising the defense of French territory in the American continent, failed to be observed by the United States as soon as 1793, when France entered in conflict with Great Britain in the Caribbean. All the U.S. could do was to maintain neutrality, but this neutrality was so negative as to forbid the French the right to equip and arm privateers in American ports, or the right to dispose of French prizes in the United States. These reluctances in effect marked the end of the alliance.

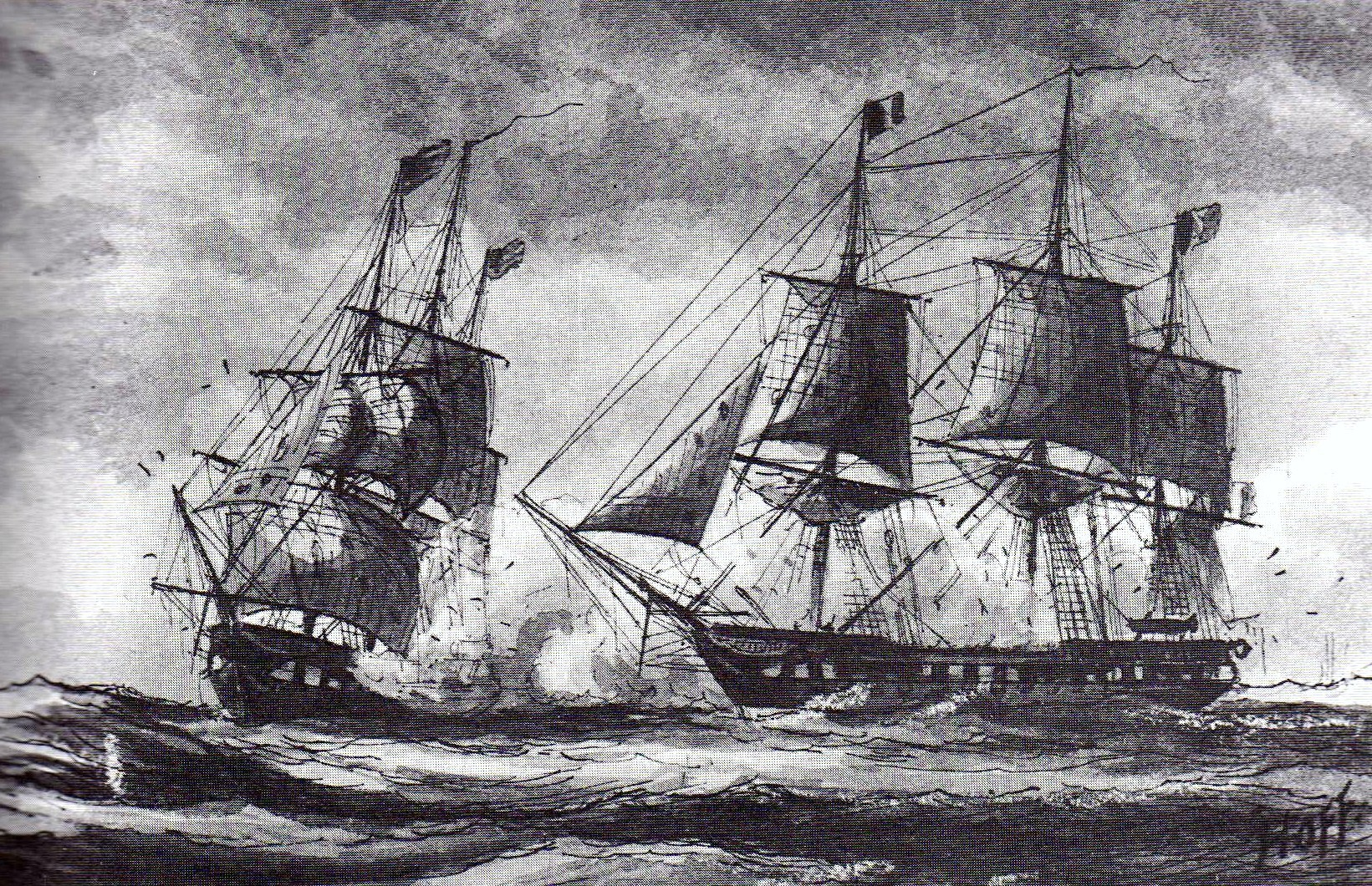
Naval encounter during the Quasi-War between USS Constellation and French ship L'Insurgente on 9 February 1799.

As the United States entered into a treaty of commerce with Great Britain in 1794, France started to attack American shipping, seizing 316 ships in 1796. In 1796, the disillusioned Minister Pierre Adet explained: "Jefferson (...) is American, and as such, he cannot sincerely be our friend. An American is the born enemy of all the European peoples", and in 1798, the XYZ Affair considerably worsened Franco-American relations.

The events led to the Quasi-War (1798–1800) between France and the United States, with actual naval encounters taking place between the two powers, with the encounter between USS Constellation and French ship L'Insurgente on 9 February 1799 off Nevis Island, and USS Constellation and La Vengeance in February 1800 off Guadeloupe. An agreement followed, in which the United States agreed to pay 20 million dollars in compensation, and France agreed to give up its claims to the 1778 Treaty.

Anglo-American relations began to deteriorate during the early 1800s as a result of a variety of issues, including British interference with American trade. The British government passed the Orders in Council in 1807, which forbade neutral nations from trading with France and its allies and resulted in American ships destined for French ports being seized or impounded. American authorities repeatedly used economic coercion against Britain in an unsuccessful attempt to force the Orders in Council to be rescinded. The dispute was a major contributing factor to American resentment towards Britain that led to the outbreak of the War of 1812.

== Historical perspectives ==
Many historians originally agreed that the American victory at Saratoga was the deciding factor in the formation of the alliance. However, in recent decades, historians have begun to rethink the victory's contribution to the formation of the alliance and to see it as an inevitable result of individual governmental interests.

In the wake of the Seven Years' War, the American Revolution in the Thirteen Colonies. Britain's victory against France and its allies in the war led to a French desire for revenge against Britain. The French saw the American Revolutionary War as an exact way to fulfil this desire. In the early years of the Revolutionary War, the French supplied American war effort but did not come out as an official ally on the side of the Americans. American envoys to France, namely Silas Deane, feared so much that the French would never join the war that they thought of telling the French that unless they sufficiently supported the war effort, the Americans would begin peace talks with Britain.

Charles Gravier, comte de Vergennes, appeared ready to offer official treaty negotiations if the Americans promised to remain independent. Because they had consistently maintained that independence was non-negotiable, Vergennes's demand proved that their strategy to threaten reunion with Britain influenced France's thinking. It also demonstrates that the victory at Saratoga played little role in the calculations of American, French, and British diplomats. Indeed, two more months of diplomacy would pass before the signing of the Franco-American treaty.

== French commanders in the alliance ==
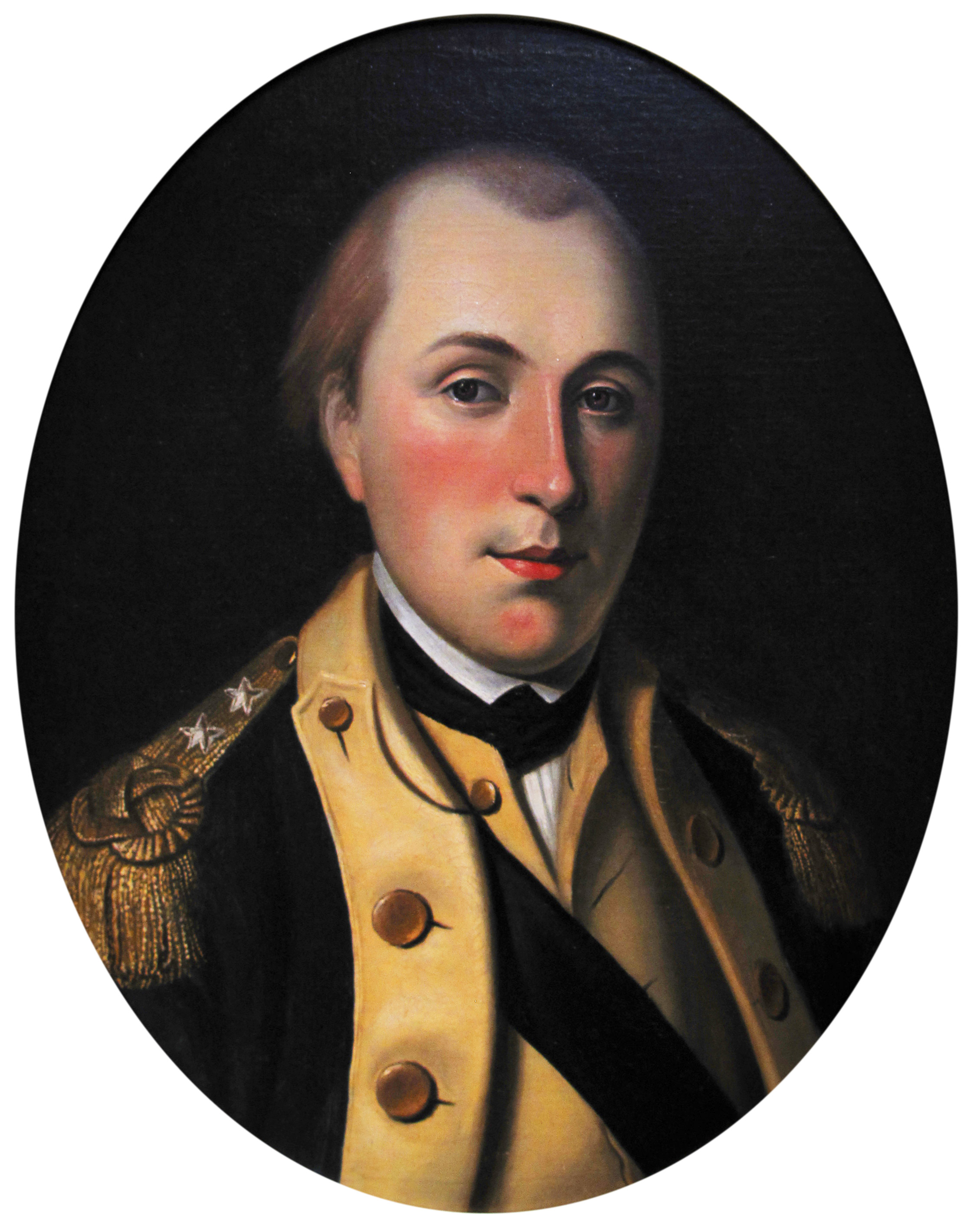
Lafayette

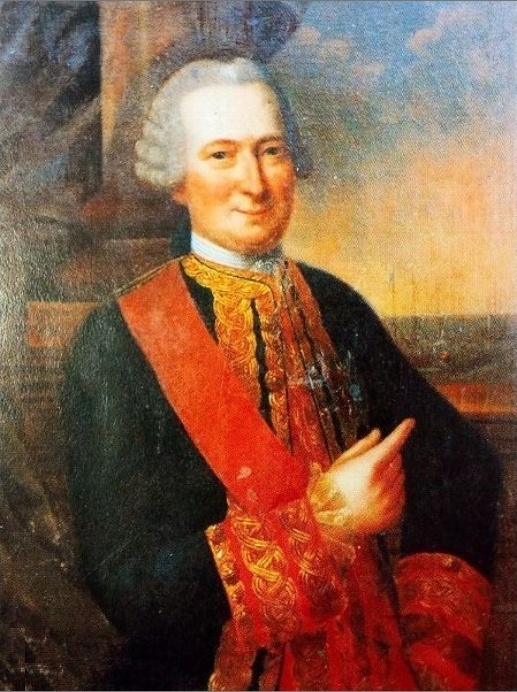
Orvilliers

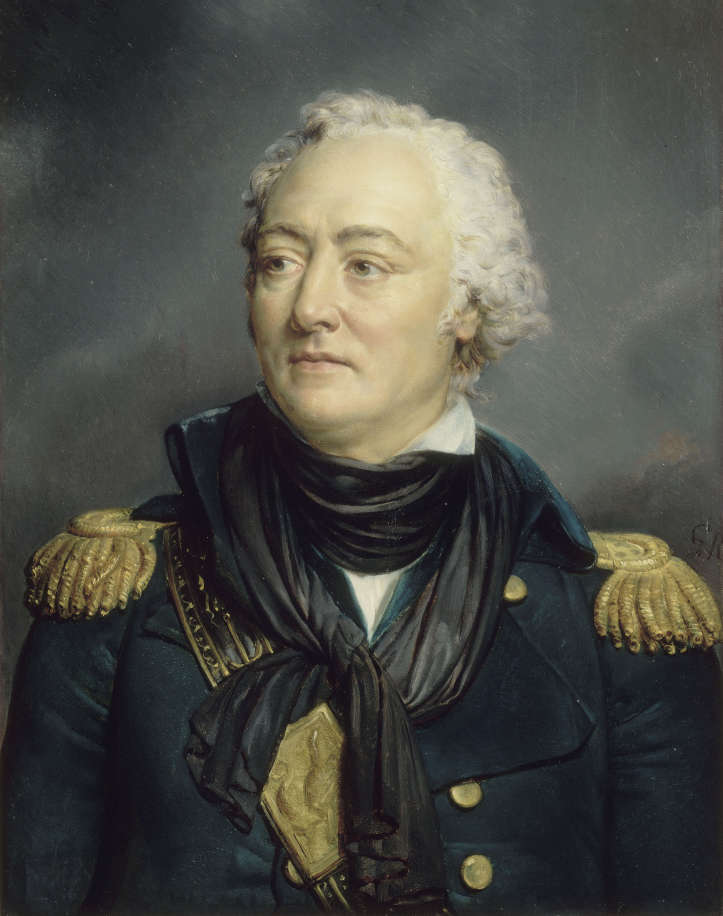
Tréville

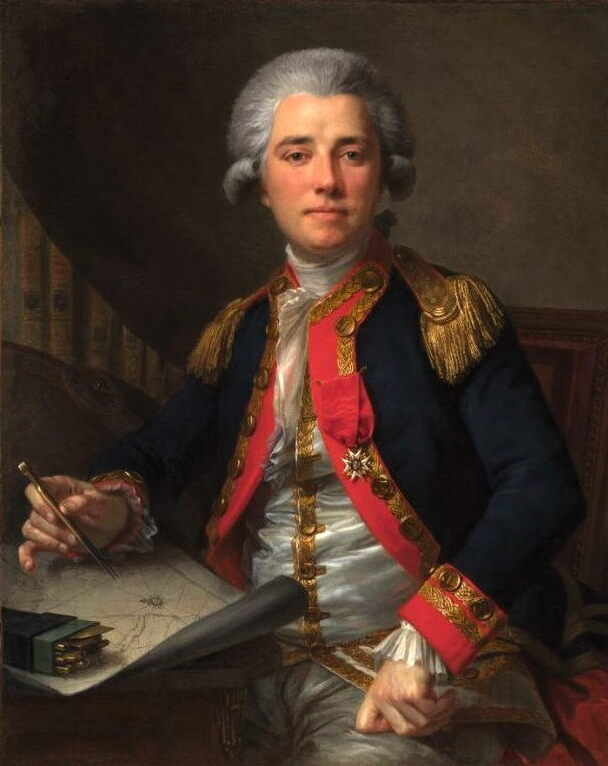
Lapérouse

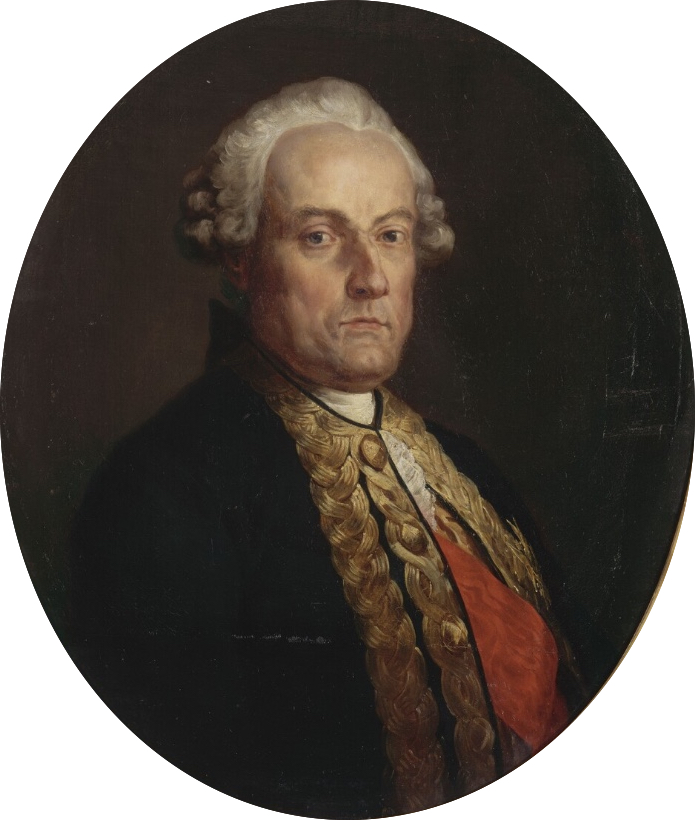
Motte

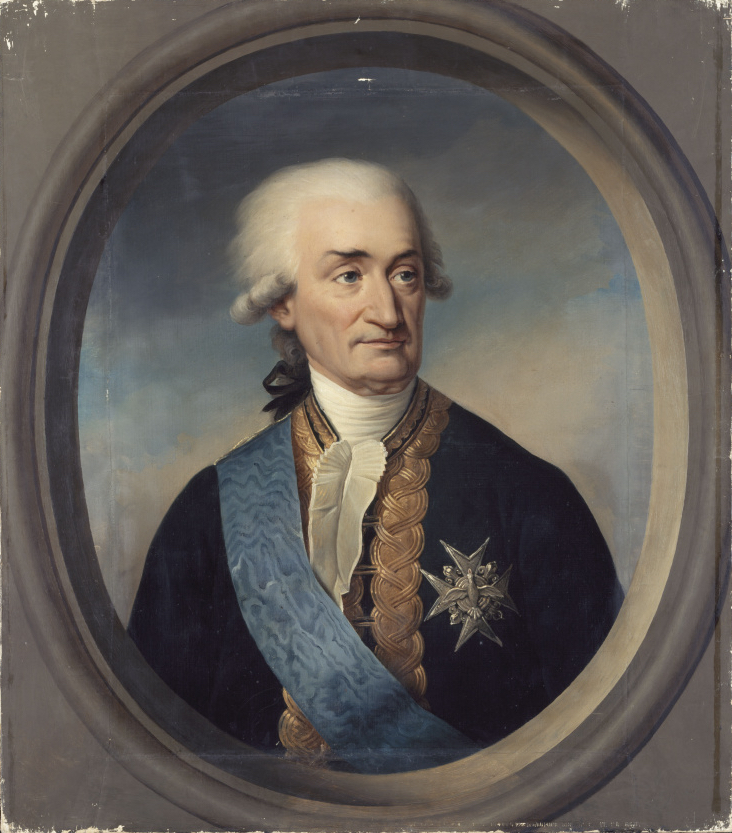
Guichen

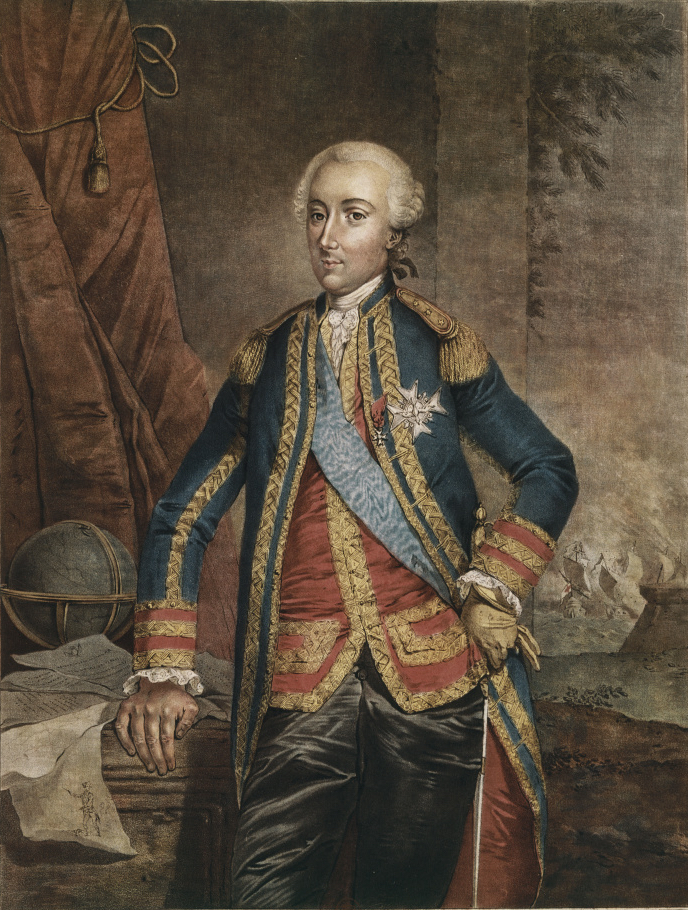
Estaing

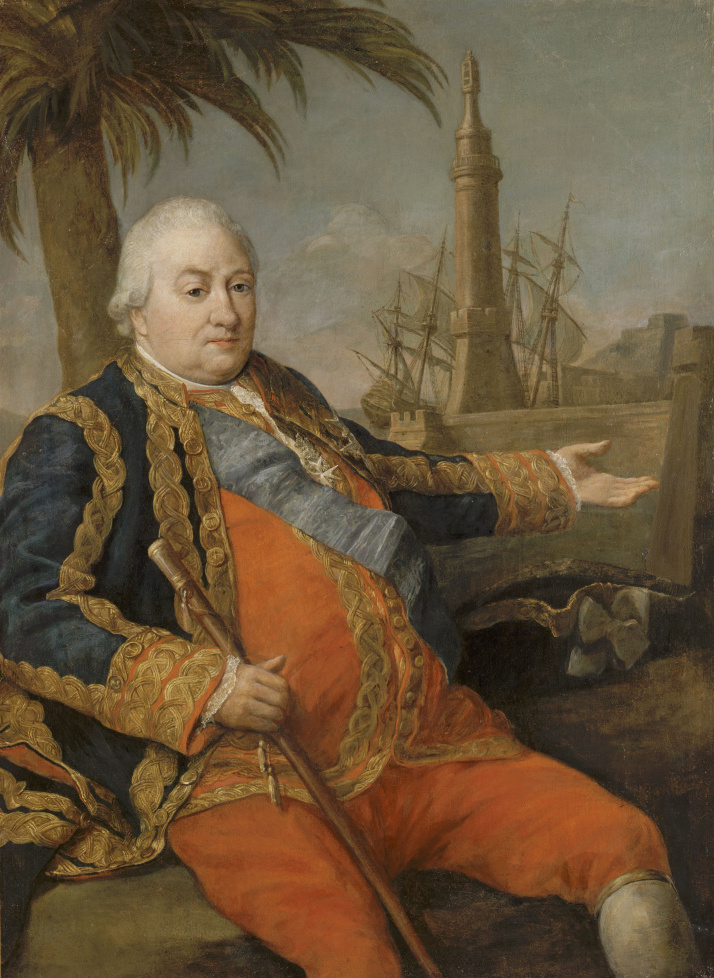
Suffren

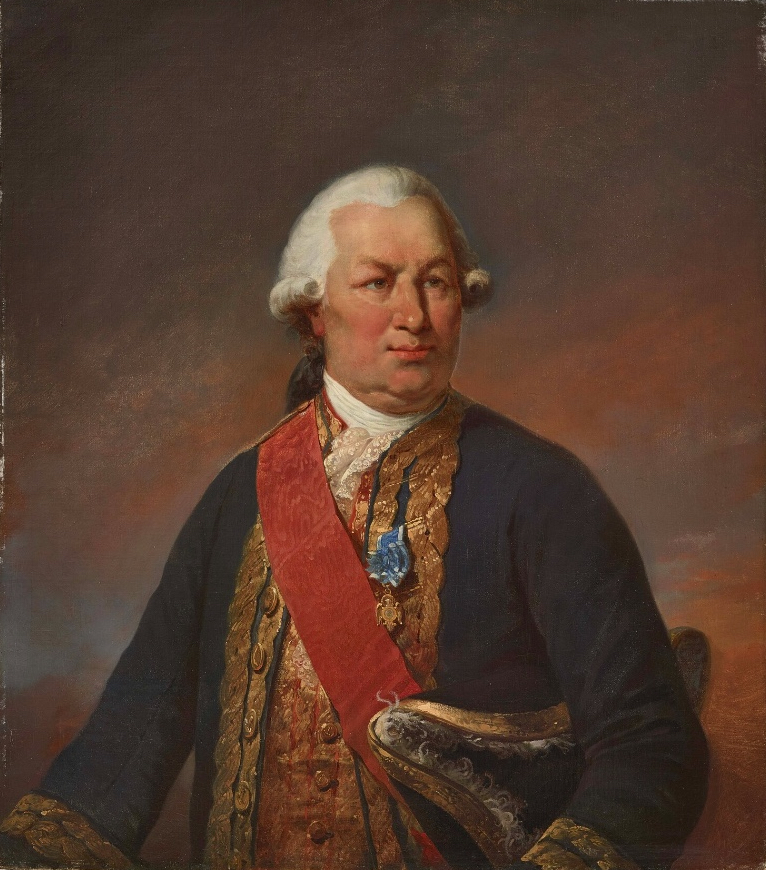
Grasse

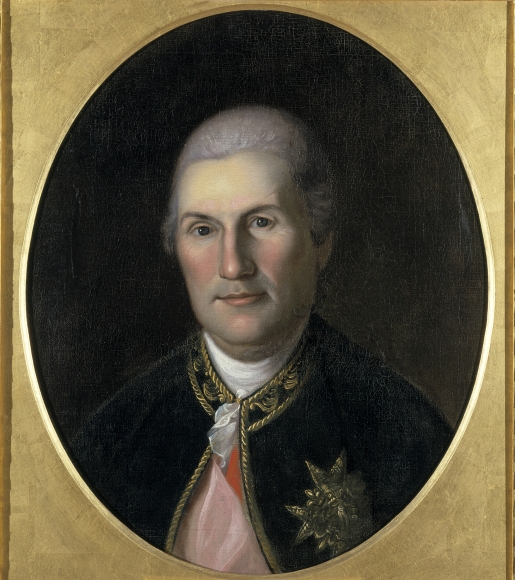
Rochambeau

== See also ==
- Odell House
- Foreign alliances of France
- France in the American Revolutionary War
- France in the Seven Years War
- Franco-Indian alliance
- French weapons in the American Civil War
- List of French units in the American Revolutionary War
- France–United States relations

== Bibliography ==
- Bemis, Samuel Flagg. The Diplomacy of the American Revolution (1935) online edition
- Brands, H. W. The First American: The Life and Times of Benjamin Franklin (2002) excerpt and text search
- Brecher, Frank W. Securing American Independence: John Jay and the French Alliance. Praeger Publishers, 2003. pp. xiv, 327 online
- Chartrand, René, and Back, Francis. The French Army in the American War of Independence Osprey; 1991.
- Corwin, Edward S. French Policy and the American Alliance of 1778 Archon Books; 1962.
- Dull, Jonathan R. (1975) The French Navy and American Independence: A Study of Arms and Diplomacy, 1774–1787. Princeton: Princeton University Press. ISBN 0691069204.
- Dull, Jonathan R. (1985) A Diplomatic History of the American Revolution. New Haven: Yale University Press. ISBN 0300034199.
- Kaplan, Lawrence S. "The Diplomacy of the American Revolution: the Perspective from France." Reviews in American History 1976 4(3): 385–390. ISSN 0048-7511 Fulltext in Jstor; review of Dull (1975)
- Ferling, John. "John Adams: Diplomat," William and Mary Quarterly 51 (1994): 227–52.
- Hutson, James H. John Adams and the Diplomacy of the American Revolution (1980).
- Hoffman, Ronald, and Peter J. Albert, eds. Diplomacy and Revolution: The Franco-American Alliance of 1778 (1981)
- Hoffman, Ronald, and Peter J. Albert, eds. Peace and the Peacemakers:The Treaty of Paris of 1783 (1986).
- Hudson, Ruth Strong. The Minister from France: Conrad-Alexandre Gérard, 1729–1790. Lutz, 1994. 279 pp.
- Kaplan, Lawrence S., ed. The American Revolution and "A Candid World (1977)
- Kaplan, Lawrence S. (1987). Entangling Alliances with None: American Foreign Policy in the Age of Jefferson. Kent State University Press. p. 24. ISBN 9780873383479.
- Ketchum, Richard M. Saratoga: Turning Point of America's Revolutionary War. New York: Holt Paperbacks, 1999.
- Kennett, Lee. The French Forces in America, 1780–1783. Greenwood, 1977. 188 pp.
- Lint, Gregg L. "John Adams on the Drafting of the Treaty Plan of 1776," Diplomatic History 2 (1978): 313–20.
- Perkins, James Breck. France in the American Revolution (1911) full text online
- Pritchard, James. "French Strategy and the American Revolution: a Reappraisal." Naval War College Review 1994 47(4): 83–108. ISSN 0028-1484
- Schiff, Stacy. A Great Improvisation: Franklin, France, and the Birth of America (2005)
- Simms, Brendan. Three Victories and a Defeat: The Rise and Fall of the First British Empire. Penguin Books, 2008.
- Stinchcombe, William E. The American Revolution and the French Alliance (1969)
- Tudda, Chris. "A Messiah that Will Never Come." Diplomatic History, issue 5 (November, 2008): pp. 779–810.
- Unger, Harlow Giles. Lafayette (2002) online
