= List of French units in the American Revolutionary War =

This is a list of French units in the American Revolutionary War. Other battalions and regiment served on marine/naval service, but can be viewed on their own articles.

== American Service ==
Those units which served on the American Continent (not naval) included:

- 1^{ére} Légion (Volontaires Étrangers de la Marine) — also saw service in the Caribbean
- 2^{éme} Légion (Lauzun's Legion) — Cavalry and Infantry
- Infantry Regiments
  - Armagnac
  - Bourbonnais
  - Soissonnais
  - Royal-Deux-Ponts
  - Saintonge
  - Agénois
  - Gâtinais
  - Touraine
  - Hainault (2nd Battalion)
  - Foix (2nd Battalion)
  - Dillon's
  - Walsh
  - Guadeloupe — also saw service in French Antilles
- Artillery Regiments
  - Auxonne (2nd Battalion)
  - Metz (2nd Battalion)
  - Grenoble (one company)

== Caribbean Service ==
Those units which fought in the Caribbean included:

- Armagnac Regiment
- Volontaires Libres (served in Guadeloupe and Martinique)
- 1^{ére} Légion, Volontaires Étrangers de la Marine (also saw service in the States)
- Cannoniers-Bombardiers (served in Saint-Domingue, Martinique, and Guadeloupe)
French Army battles in the Caribbean (1778–1782)
French victory British victory
(Demerara is outside this map, to the southeast)

=== Garrisons of ===
==== Guadeloupe ====
- Guadeloupe Regiment located in Guadeloupe (also saw service in French Antilles and the States)
- Corps de Travailleurs

==== Saint-Domingue ====
- Cape Regiment
- Port-au-Prince Regiment
- Grenadiers Volontaires
- Chasseurs Royaux
- Chasseurs-Volontaires

==== Martinique ====
- Martinique Regiment
- Volontaires de Bouillé
- Cadets de Saint-Pierre
- Cadets du Gros-Morne

=== Actions in the Caribbean ===
Year	Location	Battle	French units involved
1778	Dominica	Invasion of Dominica	Auxerrois (Au), Martinique (M), Viennois (V)
1778	St Lucia	Capture of St. Lucia	Armagnac (Ar), M, Royal-Artillerie (R-A)
1779	St Vincent	Capture of St. Vincent	Champagne (C), M, V
1779	Grenada	Capture of Grenada	Au, Cambrésis, C, Dillon (D), Foix, Hainault, M, R-A, 1^{ére} Légion de la Volontaires Étrangers de la Marine (1)
1780	St Vincent	Capture of St. Vincent	Au, V
1781	St Lucia, Tobago	Invasion of Tobago	Ar, Au, Brie (B), D, Royal-Comtois (R-C), V, Walsh (W)
1781	St Eustatius	Capture of Sint Eustatius	Au, D, R-C, W
1782	St Kitts	Siege of Brimstone Hill	Ar, Au, Agénois, B, R-A, R-C, D, Touraine, V, 1
1782	Demerara	Capture of Demerara and Essequibo	Ar, 1
1782	Montserrat	Capture of Montserrat	Au

== Bibliography ==
- MFA (1903). Les Combattants Français de la Guerre Américaine 1778–1783 (PDF) (in French). Paris, France: Ministry of Foreign Affairs.
- Smith, Digby; Kiley, Kevin F.; Black, Jeremy (2008). An Illustrated Encyclopedia of Uniforms of the American War of Independence. London, United Kingdom: Lorenz Books. ISBN 978-0-7548-1761-1.

=== Louis Susane ===
- Susane, Louis (1850a). Corréard, Joseph (ed.). Histoire de l'ancienne infanterie française (in French). Vol. II. Paris, France: Librairie militaire, maritime et polytechnique.
- Susane, Louis (1850b). Corréard, Joseph (ed.). Histoire de l'ancienne infanterie française (in French). Vol. III. Paris, France: Librairie militaire, maritime et polytechnique.
- Susane, Louis (1851a). Corréard, Joseph (ed.). Histoire de l'ancienne infanterie française (in French). Vol. IV. Paris, France: Librairie militaire, maritime et polytechnique.
- Susane, Louis (1851b). Corréard, Joseph (ed.). Histoire de l'ancienne infanterie française (in French). Vol. V. Paris, France: Librairie militaire, maritime et polytechnique.
- Susane, Louis (1852). Corréard, Joseph (ed.). Histoire de l'ancienne infanterie française (in French). Vol. VI. Paris, France: Librairie militaire, maritime et polytechnique.
- Susane, Louis (1853a). Corréard, Joseph (ed.). Histoire de l'ancienne infanterie française (in French). Vol. VII. Paris, France: Librairie militaire, maritime et polytechnique.
- Susane, Louis (1853b). Corréard, Joseph (ed.). Histoire de l'ancienne infanterie française (in French). Vol. VIII. Paris, France: Librairie militaire, maritime et polytechnique.
