= Cahiers de doléances =

1789 grievance lists of the French Revolution

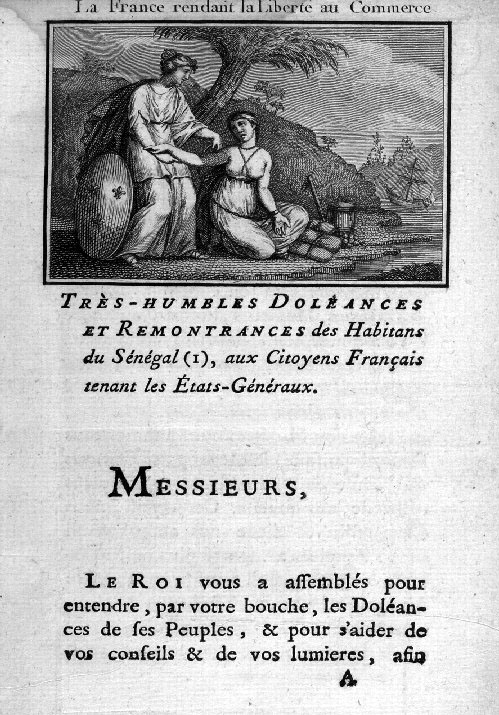
Cahier de doléances of Saint-Louis, Senegal (1789)

The Cahiers de doléances (French pronunciation: [kaje də dɔleɑ̃s]; or simply Cahiers as they were often known) were the lists of grievances drawn up by each of the three Estates in France, between January and April 1789, the year in which the French Revolution began. Their compilation was ordered by Louis XVI, who had convened the Estates General of 1789 to manage the revolutionary situation, to give each of the Estates – the First Estate (the clergy), the Second Estate (the nobility) and the Third Estate, which consisted of everyone else, including the urban working class, the rural peasantry, and middle class and professional people, who were the only ones in the group likely to have their voices heard – the chance to express their hopes and grievances directly to the King. They were explicitly discussed at a special meeting of the Estates-General held on 5 May 1789. Many of these lists have survived and provide considerable information about the state of the country on the eve of the revolution. The documents recorded criticisms of government waste, indirect taxes, church taxes and corruption, and the hunting rights of the aristocracy.

While the cahiers conveyed the grievances of common people, they were not meant to directly challenge the Ancien Régime. They were instead suggestions of reforms. Still, the writing of the cahiers forced the people of France to think about the problems that France faced, and how they wanted them fixed. The political discussions that raged throughout France were a direct challenge to the current system, as they gave the people a voice, and subsequently the cahiers were used to guide the elected representatives in what to discuss at the Estates General. In essence, they added greatly to a revolutionary air of expectation of the Estates General.

== Cahiers of the First Estate ==
The Cahiers of the First Estate reflected the interests of the parish clergy. They called for an end to bishops holding more than one diocese, and demanded that commoners be eligible to the episcopate. In return they were prepared to give up the financial privileges of the Church. They were not, however, prepared to give up the dominant position that the Church held over the other two Estates. They did not intend to allow Protestants to practise religion, and under the revocation of the Edict of Nantes by King Louis XIV, wanted to keep Roman Catholicism the only official religion in France. In the upper clergy, their cahiers focused on the retainment of their power, while the lower clergy had an opinion more closely connected to commoners.

== Cahiers of the Second Estate ==
Among the three Estates, the Second Estate's cahiers were possibly the most surprising. Many of them proved to be quite liberal in their opinions, 89% voting that they were willing to give up their financial privileges. Although they had, until then, opposed the idea of commoners entering their ranks (as shown by the Segur Ordinance), they finally accepted the fact that merit, as much as hereditary status, should qualify men to hold certain offices (including Military, Administrative and Venal Offices). They also attacked the government for being out of date and the injustice of the Ancien Régime.

== Cahiers of the Third Estate ==
Many of the cahiers of the Third Estate were composed using models sent from Paris, and it is probable that cahiers from poorer villages were constrained in expressing their grievances. The cahiers were also highly variable in tone depending on where they came from, meaning that while they are often summarized as raising more sweeping and general complaints about French society at the time, many of the grievances shared were highly specific, such as Parish of St. Germain d'Airan asking "That dovecotes be destroyed...and that it be ordered that those remaining shall be closed in such a way that pigeons may not leave during the times of planting and harvest."

The cahiers of the Third Estate spoke out mainly against the financial privileges held by the two other Estates. They were both exempt from most taxes such as the church tithe and the taille (the main direct tax). They also wanted to have a fair voting system in the Estates-General. At the moment, they would be outvoted by the other two orders, who would combine their votes on any issue that suited them. They had double representation (600, rather than 300 members representing them), but each estate had a single vote, and thus having double the representative would only be effective if they were voting by head, and not by order.

== Usage during 2018 yellow vests movement ==
In December 2018 and January 2019, Emmanuel Macron, President of the French Fifth Republic, asked for a compilation of Cahiers de doléances from across the country, which was completed in mid-January. Macron responded to the large number of petitions by calling for self-organized town halls, which took place over the period of January to March.
