= Jacques-Donatien Le Ray de Chaumont =

French businessman

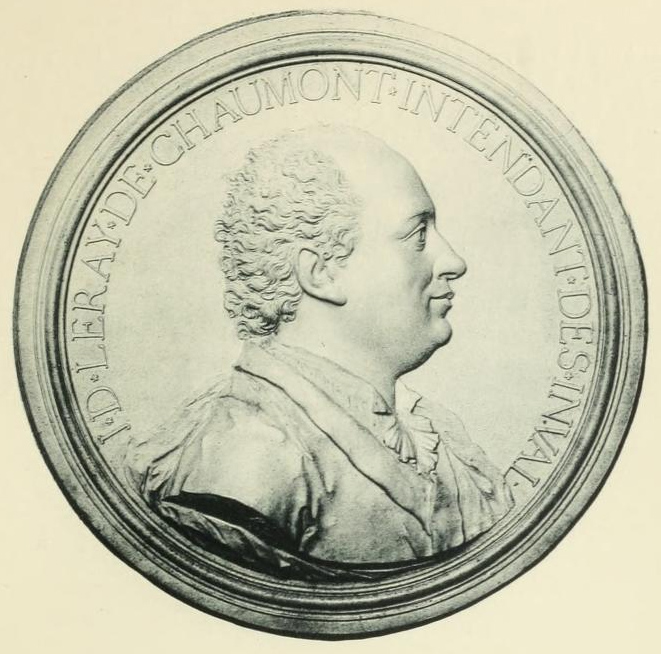
Jacques-Donatien Le Ray de Chaumont by Jean-Baptiste Nini (1771), Château de Chaumont

Jacques-Donatien Le Ray de Chaumont (1 September 1726 – 22 February 1803) was a French "Father of the American Revolution", but later an opponent of the French Revolution. His son of the same name, known also in America as James Le Ray, eventually became a United States citizen and settled in Le Ray, New York, United States.

== American Revolution ==
Le Ray de Chaumont served King Louis XVI at the Court at Versailles as the Governor of Les Invalides in Paris and the Grand Master of Waters and Lands of Blois. Following the Declaration of Independence from Great Britain, by the American colonies on 4 July 1776, emissaries were dispatched to France by the new United States revolutionary government to seek assistance from the French king. Although anxious to see Great Britain weakened, Louis XVI had to walk a political tightrope. He understood that support for the rebellion in America was a contradiction of France's global colonization policies and could spark a revolt in any number of France's own colonies. As such, the American delegation could not be officially recognized at the French Court.

Sympathetic to the American cause for independence, Le Ray de Chaumont used his powerful position to act as intermediary between the King and the American representatives. But, Le Ray did much more than broker talks and exert influence. In addition to swaying the King and the powerful administrators of the French government, Le Ray provided a fully staffed mansion for Benjamin Franklin and his family in the wealthy commune of Passy, then outside of Paris.

In December 1776, Franklin was sent to Paris with the primary goal of obtaining French aid for the United States. He quickly developed a close relationship with Le Ray and his family and lived at Le Ray's estate in Passy for several years. Franklin however did not visit Le Ray's luxurious Chateau de Chaumont (at Chaumont-sur-Loire) in the Loire Valley but his grandson Temple did. As a result of their friendship, Jacques-Donatien Le Ray de Chaumont helped obtain French support for the American cause with both money and French armed forces.

Along with Benjamin Franklin, Le Ray de Chaumont worked with John Adams, Silas Deane, the Marquis de Lafayette, and the Comte de Vergennes to help with the American Revolution. Le Ray was asked by the American government to take charge of the equipment and management of the combined French and American naval fleet. Working closely with Admiral Charles-Hector Estaing, the Commander of the French Fleet, Le Ray's support for the American cause involved having his shipyards refit a merchant vessel into a warship that he then gifted to America under the name USS Bonhomme Richard for use by Captain John Paul Jones.

When the war ended with the treaty of 1783 signed in Paris, Le Ray de Chaumont had a portrait medallion made of Benjamin Franklin by Jean-Baptiste Nini. Today, it is Franklin's most recognized profile. And, when Franklin was recalled to America in 1785, Le Ray honored him with a commissioned portrait painted by Joseph Siffred Duplessis that now hangs in the National Portrait Gallery of the Smithsonian Institution in Washington, D.C.

Jacques-Donatien Le Ray de Chaumont's son, named Jacques Le Ray (1760–1840), went to America in 1785. There, he acquired a property in Otsego County, New York where he built the first sawmill. Known in America as James, the English translation for Jacques, Le Ray Jr. also made large land purchases in the State and on 17 July 1789 he married Grace Coxe from New Jersey and became an American citizen. He signed the marriage bond as Le Ray de Chaumont, but in the body of the instrument his name is entered as James Donatien Le Ray de Chaumontt. The towns of Le Ray, New York, Chaumont, New York and the borough of Le Raysville, Pennsylvania are named after him.

== Aftermath ==
In the end, the political ideals that Le Ray de Chaumont cherished came back to haunt him. The huge financial support he had elicited from King Louis XVI for the American Revolutionary War led to massive debts that would bankrupt the government of France.

When a drought caused a deep famine in 1788, there was no money available from the French Treasury, as had been done in the past, to subsidize the cost of flour for bread to prevent mass starvation. As a result of France's generosity and Le Ray de Chaumont's love of America, he inadvertently helped pave the way for the French Revolution, in 1789, that dramatically impacted on his own finances, resulting in the new French Revolutionary government seizing his assets including his beloved Chateau at Chaumont-sur-Loire.

== See also ==
- Roderigue Hortalez and Company
