= Capture of Montserrat =

1782 French naval expedition against the British during the American Revolutionary War

Coordinates: 16°45′N 62°12′W

- Part of the American Revolutionary War and the Anglo-French War (1778–1783)
Date	22 February 1782
Location	Montserrat, West Indies
Result	French victory

Belligerents
France	Great Britain

Commanders and leaders
Comte de Barras; Charles François Joseph, Comte de Flechin	Gov. Michael White

Strength
4 ships 500 men	Unknown

Casualties and losses
Unknown, minimum	Unknown casualties 68 artillery guns taken

The Capture of Montserrat was accomplished by a French naval expedition that seized the island of Montserrat from the British on 22 February 1782 during the American Revolutionary War.

== Background ==
Following the Franco-American success in the October 1781 Siege of Yorktown, French Admiral François Joseph Paul de Grasse returned to the West Indies to continue campaigning against British-held islands there. In concert with the French governor of the West Indies, the Marquis de Bouillé, he sought to capture Barbados, a key British possession. However, two separate attempts failed to reach the island, which is to the windward of most of the Caribbean islands and can require a lengthy journey against the prevailing easterly trade winds to reach. The leaders then turned to other targets, beginning with St. Kitts, which was besieged on 11 January 1782. St. Kitts fell on 13 February, at which time de Grasse detached a squadron to take Montserrat.

== Capture ==
The Comte de Barras, commander of the squadron, dispatched the Count of Flechin, along with 500 men from the Régiment Auxerrois, to capture the island from the British. At the time of its surrender, British artillery on Montserrat consisted of 62 pieces of cannon of different bores and six howitzers.

Montserrat was occupied by the French until it was returned pursuant to the terms of the 1783 Treaty of Versailles.
