= Jacques-Melchior Saint-Laurent, Comte de Barras =

French Navy officer

- Born: 18 April 1720
- Died: 1792 (aged 71–72)
- Branch: French Navy
- Rank: vice admiral
- Conflicts: War of American Independence

Jacques-Melchior Saint-Laurent, Comte de Barras (French pronunciation: [ʒak mɛlʃjɔʁ sɛ̃ lɔʁɑ̃ də baʁɑ]; 18 April 1720 – 1792) was a French Navy officer of the eighteenth century. He notably served in Yorktown Campaign of the War of American Independence.

== Biography ==
From 25 November 1761 to 11 April 1762, with the rank of Lieutenant, he captained the frigate Oiseau for a mission in the Eastern Mediterranean.

In early 1781 Barras' French squadron was based at Newport, Rhode Island. His orders from France were to mount an expedition against Newfoundland. Barras was persuaded by the Comte de Rochambeau to instead go southwards and rendezvous with Admiral De Grasse, who had brought his French fleet from the West Indies. The series of events led to the surrender of a British Army at Yorktown.

The following year Barras served under De Grasse in the West Indies. Barras led a French expedition to capture Montserrat in February 1782. Later Barras participated in the Battle of the Saintes in the Caribbean Sea where Admiral Rodney's ships broke the French line. The British victory led to the failure of a Franco-Spanish invasion plan against Jamaica.
