= Siege of Brimstone Hill =

1782 siege on Saint Kitts in the American Revolutionary War

Coordinates: 17°09′N 62°35′W

- Part of the American Revolutionary War and the Anglo-French War (1778–1783)
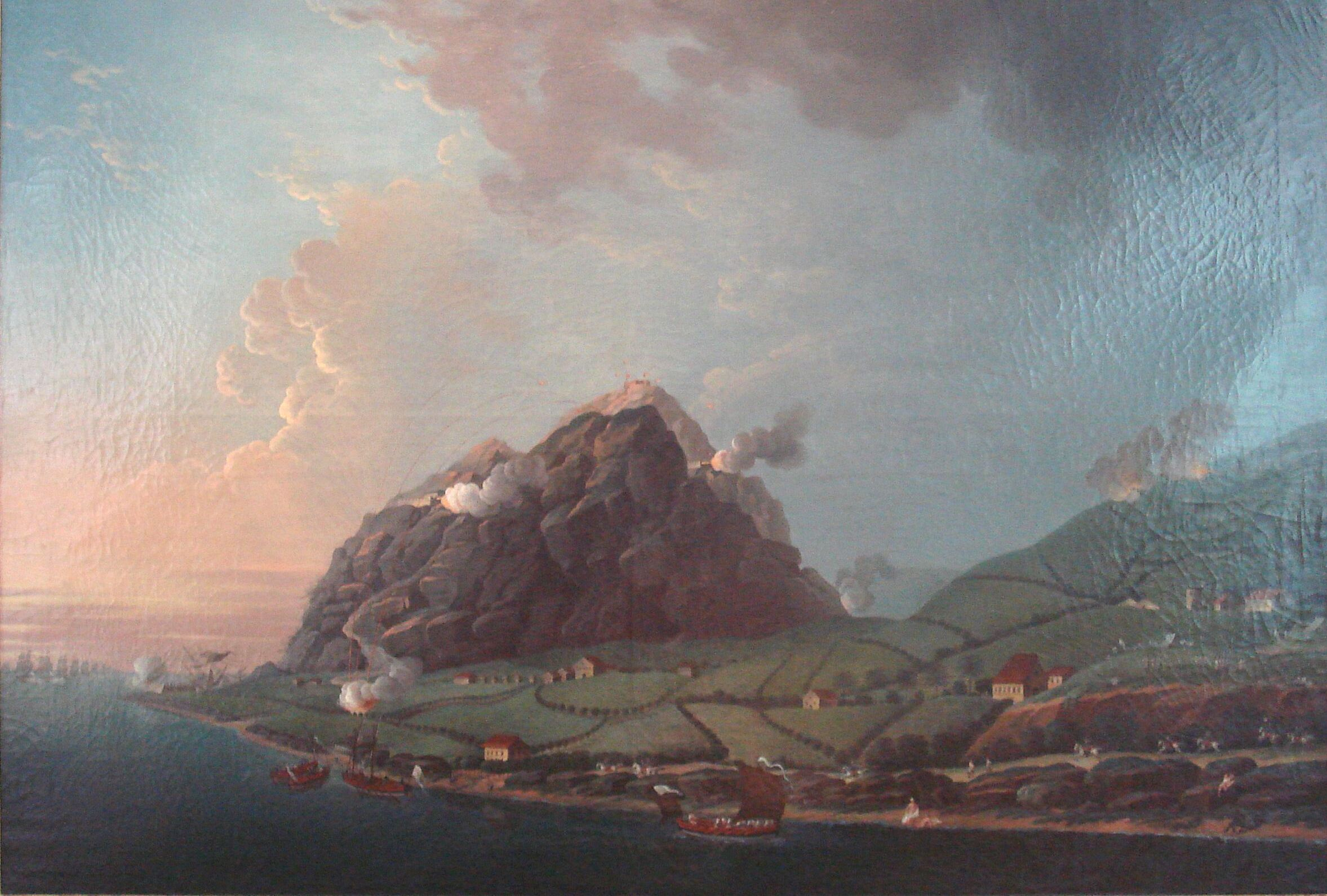
- Painting of the invasion
Date	19 January – 12 February 1782 (3 weeks and 3 days)
Location	Saint Kitts and Nevis, British West Indies
Result	French victory
Territorial changes	Saint Kitts and Nevis occupied by France until 1783

Belligerents
France	Great Britain

Commanders and leaders
Comte de Grasse; Marquis de Bouillé	Thomas Shirley (surrendered); Thomas Fraser (surrendered); Sir Samuel Hood; Robert Prescott

Strength
7,000 men	3,000 men

Casualties and losses
Unknown	107 killed 207 wounded hundreds sick

The French invasion of Saint Kitts also known as the siege of Brimstone Hill, from 19 January–13 February 1782, was a part of the American Revolutionary War. After landing on Saint Kitts, French troops under the Marquis de Bouillé stormed and besieged the fortress of Brimstone Hill. The Comte de Grasse, who delivered de Bouillé's troops and supported the siege, was outmanoeuvred and deprived of his anchorage by Admiral Samuel Hood. Even though Hood's force was inferior by one-third, de Grasse was beaten off when he attempted to dislodge Hood. Hood's attempts to relieve the ongoing siege were unsuccessful, and the garrison capitulated after one month. About a year later, the Treaty of Paris restored Saint Kitts and adjacent Nevis to British rule.

== Forces ==
=== British Forces ===
British forces included:

- 1st Battalion, 1st (Royal) Regiment of Foot
- 15th Regiment of Foot
- 28th Regiment of Foot
- 55th Regiment of Foot
- 69th Regiment of Foot

=== French Forces ===
French forces included:

- Régiment d'Armagnac (2 Battalions, minus two detachments: first aboard the ships, and 2nd in Saint-Domingue)
- Landing Party Régiment d'Agenois
- Landing Party from Régiment d'Auxerrois
- Detachment from Régiment de Touraine
- Detachment from Régiment de Viennois
- Detachment from Régiment de Brie
- Régiment de Royal Comtois
- Detachment from Régiment de Dillon
- 1ére Legion (Volontaires Étrangers de la Marine)
- Detachment of Marine Artillery

== French capture ==
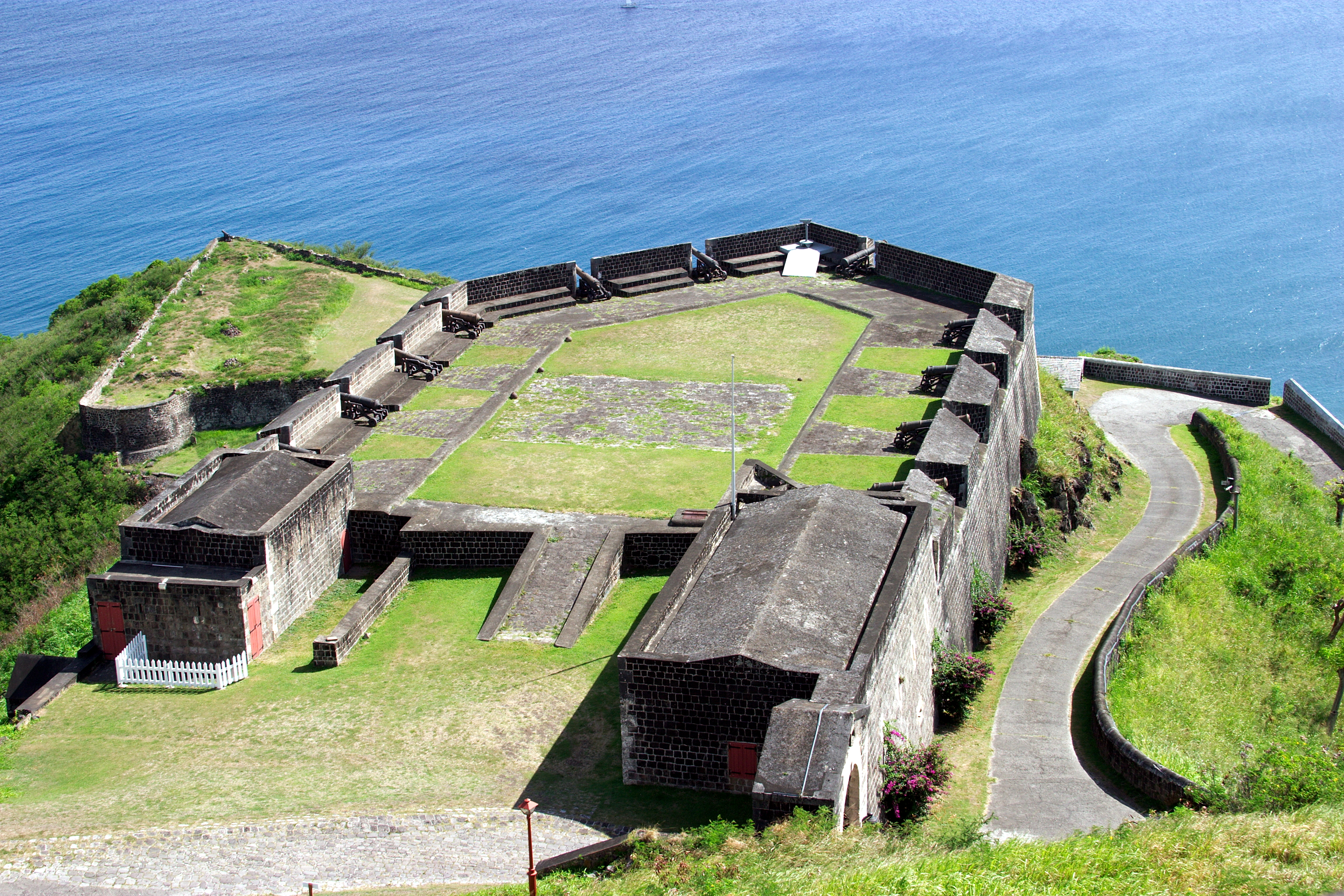
Brimstone Hill

De Grasse set sail from Martinique, reaching Saint Kitts by 11 January. The British had already retired into their stronghold under Brigadier General Fraser, so the French landing forces disembarked without opposition and began to besiege them on 19 January. In concert with the Governor of the French West Indies, de Bouillé, an attack by de Grasse upon Barbados was previously planned, but adverse winds forced them to return to Martinique, and then onwards to Saint Kitts.

On 24 January, 22 British warships under Admiral Hood were sighted near Nevis intending to reinforce Saint Kitts. De Grasse went out to intercept then, but by dawn the next day Hood had veered towards Montserrat, and contrary east-southeast winds impeded the French from reaching the British before they had circled north around Nevis and dropped anchor off Basseterre. De Grasse attacked the anchored British fleet on both the morning and afternoon of 26 January, but was beaten off, disembarkation proceeding apace. During these naval engagements, the French suffered 107 killed and 207 wounded, compared to 72 dead and 244 injured for the British. On 28 January, the 1,200-man British vanguard advanced against the town of Basseterre under General Prescott, while its French occupiers fought a delaying action under Colonel de Fléchin with 274 men of the regiments of Agénois and Touraine until the de Bouillé could hasten reinforcements across the island.

Prescott's drive was eventually repelled, but otherwise French efforts continued to be hampered by the loss of their field artillery in a wreck while approaching Saint Kitts and the capture of an ammunition ship by one of Hood's frigates. The governor sent artillery and ammunition to Fraser, which were intercepted by the inhabitants, and by them deliberately made over to the French. Defending the fort at Brimstone Hill were the 1st Battalion of the 1st Foot (approximately 700), flank companies of the 15th Foot (approximately 120), Royal Artillery detachment, and many militia. By 12 February, Fraser's little garrison, having lost over 150 killed and wounded, besides many men out of action through sickness, was exhausted. Additionally, there were breaches in the walls, and many of the militia petitioned to surrender. Fraser had no alternative but to negotiate a surrender that included marching out with the honors of war. The next day, de Grasse ventured to Nevis to meet an arriving convoy of French victuallers (food supply ships), while Hood availed himself of the opportunity to escape in the opposite direction on the morning of 14 February.
