= Roderigue Hortalez and Company =

International enterprise supporting American Revolution

Pierre-Augustin de Beaumarchais, who organized the enterprise

Roderigue Hortalez and Company was an enterprise that funneled covert French and Spanish military and financial aid to the United States prior to the formal Franco-American alliance against Britain. With the backing of the French Minister of Foreign Affairs Charles Gravier, comte de Vergennes, the enterprise was organized by Pierre-Augustin de Beaumarchais. Through the company, weapons and other war material were sent to American forces.

== Background ==
The Seven Years' War had gone badly for France, which had lost all of New France and had been militarily humiliated by the British. Spain, which had been an ally of France late in the war, had lost the strategically important territory of Florida. Britain, meanwhile, had expanded its colonial territories across large areas of North America. In 1773, a jealous nobleman got into a scuffle with Pierre-Augustin de Beaumarchais, which resulted in the playwright spending ten weeks in jail and losing his citizenship rights. To get out of legal trouble, Beaumarchais pledged his services to the king in order to get his civil rights restored. In 1774, Charles Gravier, comte de Vergennes, was appointed as the Minister of Foreign Affairs by King Louis XVI. Vergennes was strongly anti-British and at one point declared, "England is the natural enemy of France." His chance to strike at Britain came through Beaumarchais.

== Proposal ==
Beaumarchais, working as a secret agent, had traveled to London in pursuit of Chevalière d'Éon, an agent of Louis who had threatened the king with blackmail. During that period, Beaumarchais fell in with the dissolute crowd that surrounded John Wilkes, the Mayor of London. There, he received a letter from the Continental Congress that was delivered by Arthur Lee. The letter had Congress suggest to the French government that it should encourage the rebellion in the Thirteen Colonies by sending secret military aid disguised as a loan. Beaumarchais believed that Britain's economy would be significantly crippled without the Thirteen Colonies.

== Opposition ==
The only major opposition to the plan came from French Finance Minister Baron Turgot, who insisted that American independence would occur whether or not France financed the rebellion. He predicted that the funding would add to the already-heavy burden of the general French military and naval buildup and lead to the bankruptcy of France. Turgot eventually resigned in protest.

== Operation in action ==
Louis XVI and Vergennes agreed to help the Patriots. Both were unwilling to show their support openly, at least until after the rebellion had successfully begun. Before the Declaration of Independence had even been signed, weapons and other necessities were already flowing via the ostensibly neutral Dutch island of St. Eustatius. Muskets, cannons, cannonballs, gunpowder, bombs, mortars, tents, and enough clothing for 30,000 men were sent. The assistance kept American hopes alive during the spring of 1776.

== Failure to pay by rebels ==
Hortalez & Co. conducted business with the Americans from France through the Connecticut merchant Silas Deane, who shared a covert trade agency with Thomas Morris, the half-brother of Robert Morris. Because the business did not include him, Lee made it a point that Deane would never be paid his commission on the goods that Beaumarchais had provided by ensuring that the Frenchman was never paid.

By convincing the committee not to pay its debt to avoid creating a trail that could reveal the Americans' dealing with the French to the British, Lee forced Deane, who eventually died trying to prove that he was owed his rightful compensation, into disgrace and poverty for years and also destroyed Beaumarchais financially.

In a letted from August 16, 1777 from Lee to the "secrete committee of congress", he wrote of Beaumarchais:

This gentleman is not a merchant, but is known as a political agent, employed by the French Court. Remittances, therefore, to him, so far from covering the business, would create suspicions, or rather satisfy the British Court these suspicions are just. At the same time, his circumstances and situation forbid one to hope, that your property, being once in his hands, could ever be recovered; and, as an attempt to force him to account, would hazard a discover of the whole transaction, this government would, of course, discountenance or forbid it".

== Sources ==
- Bass, Streeter. "Beaumarchais and the American Revolution." Studies in Intelligence 14 (1970): 1-1. CIA report
- Meng, John J. "A Footnote to Secret Aid in the American Revolution." American Historical Review (1938) 43#4 pp: 791-795. in JSTOR
- Morton, Brian N. "'Roderigue Hortalez' to the Secret Committee: An Unpublished French Policy Statement of 1777." French Review (1977): 875-890. in JSTOR
- Morton, Brian N. et Donald C. Spinelli, Beaumarchais Correspondances, tomes III et IV, Éditions A.-G. Nizet, Paris.
- de Langlais Tugdual, L'armateur préféré de Beaumarchais Jean Peltier Dudoyer, de Nantes à l'Isle de France, Éd. Coiffard, 2015, 340 p. (ISBN 9782919339280).
- Stillé, Charles J. "Beaumarchais and" The Lost Million"." The Pennsylvania Magazine of History and Biography (1887) 11#1 pp: 1-36. in JSTOR
- York, Neil L. "Clandestine Aid and the American Revolutionary War Effort: A Re-Examination." Military Affairs: The Journal of Military History, Including Theory and Technology (1979): 26-30. in JSTOR
