= Soissonnais Regiment =

Regiment in the French Armed Forces

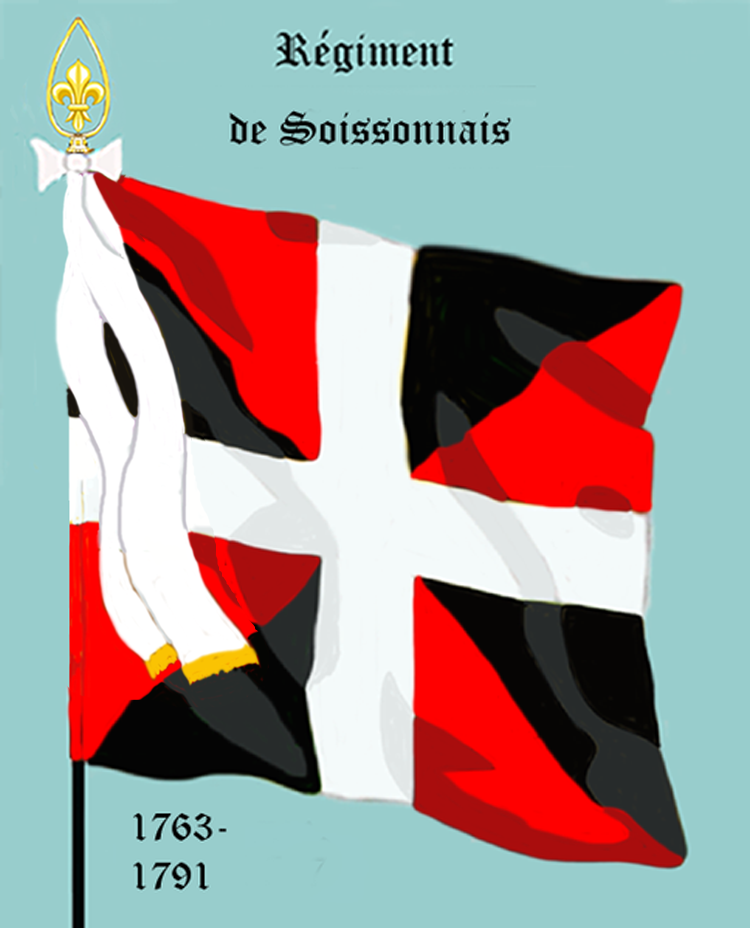
Le pavillon du régiment de 1763 à 1791.

The Régiment de Soissonnais has a long history in the French armed forces. They fought at the Battle of Fontenoy 1745 and the Battle of Yorktown (1781) during the American Revolution.
