= Ségur Ordinance =

French law

The Ségur Ordinance of 1781 was a French law that required French officer candidates to produce proof of having at least four generations of nobility. It is named after Philippe Henri de Ségur, the French minister of war at the time, although he advised against it. Officially called RÉGLEMENT portant que nul ne pourra être proposé à des sous - lieutenances s'il n'a fait preuve de quatre générations de noblesse (i.e. Regulation concerning that no one shall be proposed for a sub-lieutenancy if he has not provided proof of four generations of nobility), the ordinance was approved by Louis XVI on May 22, 1781.

The edict required all officer candidates in the French (i.e. non-foreign) infantry, cavalry and dragoons to prove four degrees of nobility in their patrilineal line. Alternatively, one had to be the son of an officer who held the Cross of Saint-Louis.

From then on it became nearly impossible for wealthy commoners or rich Nobles of the Robe to begin military service in one of the said branches of service directly as an officer (e.g., by purchasing an officer's certificate). Now, they had to rise through the ranks to gain a lieutenancy, like all low-born commoners (roturiers). That hard, uncertain slog took regularly one or two decades. For example, a commoner starting a military career between 14 and 18 years of age usually could not attain the rank of Second Lieutenant until his late-twenties to mid-thirties. Further promotions to a field or general rank became correspondingly difficult or even impossible.

In 1784, the provisions were extended to the hussars, mounted chasseurs, and the so-called foreign regiments (Régiments étrangers) of infantry, which had in fact long been predominantly French. The artillery and engineers remained excluded.

== Background ==
Preceding the French Revolution, French society had long been split into three "Estates". The First Estate contained members of the clergy, the Second Estate the French nobility, and the Third Estate the rest of the population. The Second Estate was divided into two subsets: the nobility of the sword and the nobility of the robe.

The sword, or court, nobility consisted of traditional French nobles who had hereditary connections to chivalric nobility of the Middle Ages. During the 18th century, their income was fairly static, consisting of profits from agrarian holdings and benefits from military commissions. These traditional nobles dominated the French court and considered advancement in the French Army as the highest form of aristocratic achievement. By contrast, the robe, or civic, nobility were French financiers, merchants, and real estate moguls who achieved political power through monetary advancement. Their status was newly gained relative to that of the sword nobility, often owing their position to personal success and/or intermediate family connections. They did not have the ornate genealogy of the court nobility.

The chivalric ideology of the established sword nobles naturally clashed with the presence of newer civic nobles who often lent their status to the payouts of high interest loans made to the French government. As civic nobility established generational lines, young civic nobles purchased their way to high ranks in the French Army, angering sword nobility who wished to maintain the exclusivity of officership.

== Public perception ==
The law was met with public outcry from members of the Third Estate. Many saw the ordinance as a way for the Second Estate to shut out the Bourgeois from army prestige, even though the original intent behind the law was only to exclude other nobles. The law also managed to further facilitate the niche status of robe nobility. These rich aristocrats were not bourgeois, yet their lack of long-term patrilineal legacies prevented them from being accepted among the court nobles. The resentment of both the robe nobility and the bourgeois would lead to political allegiances during the National Assembly of 1789–91. The perceived social and political injustice incited by the Ségur Ordinance was a role-player in the French Monarchy's downward spiral in the late 18th century, ultimately leading to the French Revolution.
