= Agénois Regiment =

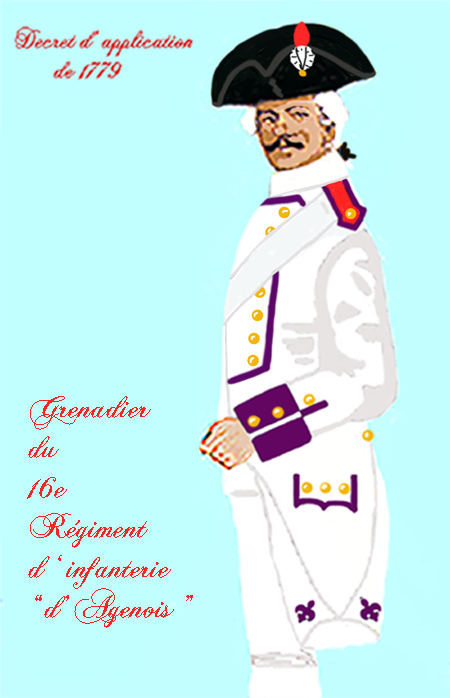
- A grenadier of the Agénois Regiment in 1779
- Active: 1595–1791
- Country: Kingdom of France
- Branch: French Royal Army
- Engagements: American Revolutionary War: Siege of Savannah (1779); Battle of Pensacola (1781)

The Agénois Regiment (French: Régiment d'Agenois) was a line infantry regiment of the French Royal Army raised in 1595. It participated in the American Revolutionary War.

== History ==
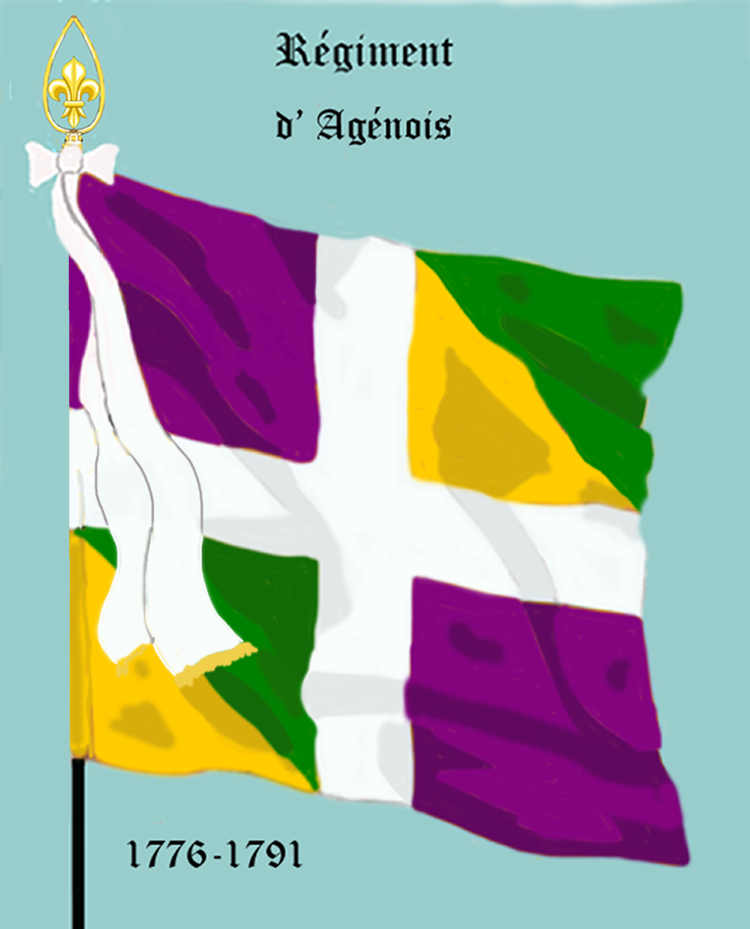
Flag of the regiment

During the American Revolutionary War, the regiment, under the command of the Baron de Cadignan, suffered heavy casualties in Charles Hector, Count of Estaing's unsuccessful siege of Savannah in 1779. A detachment of the regiment participated in the capture of Pensacola in Florida by allied Spanish forces on 26 May 1781.

In 1791, the Agenois Regiment lost its traditional title and was redesignated as the 16th Line Infantry Regiment. In 1794, all regular infantry regiments of the former Royal Army, which had become the French Revolutionary Army in 1792, were amalgamated with newly raised fédéré battalions, thereby losing their former identity.

== Uniform ==
During the reign of Louis XV, the original Agenois Regiment wore a grey-white coat with red cuffs and waistcoat.
