= Jean Gaspard de Vence =

French privateer and admiral

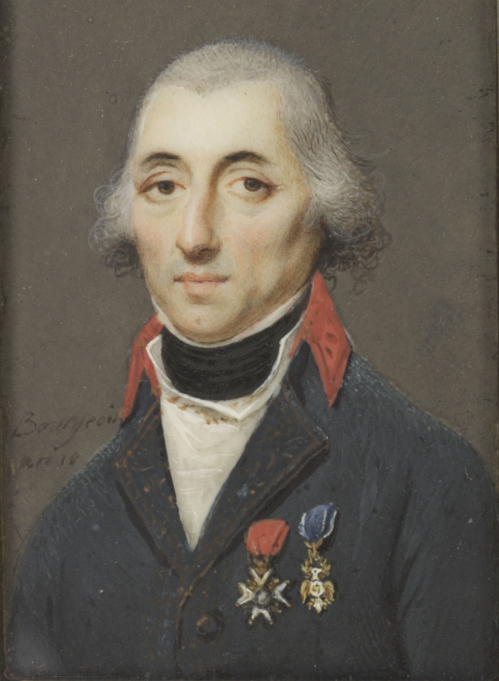
- Portrait by Bourgeois (Musée du Louvre)
- Born: 6 April 1747; Marseille, France
- Died: 12 March 1808 (aged 60); Tonnerre, France
- Military career
- Allegiance: Kingdom of France; United States; Kingdom of France (1791–1792); French First Republic
- Branch: La Royale; National Guard; French Navy
- Service years: 1763 - 1803
- Rank: Rear admiral
- Conflicts: American Revolutionary War; Invasion of Dominica; Battle of St. Lucia; British capture of St. Lucia; Capture of Grenada; Battle of Grenada; Siege of Savannah; War of the First Coalition; Battle of Groix
- Awards: Order of Saint Louis; Order of Cincinnatus; Order of the Iron Crown
- Other work: Maritime Prefect of Toulon

Jean Gaspard de Vence (French pronunciation: [ʒɑ̃ ɡaspaʁ də vɑ̃s]; 6 April 1747 – 12 March 1808) was a French privateer, admiral and Maritime Prefect of Toulon.

== Biography ==
He was born at Marseille on 6 April 1747. In 1762 at age 15 he entered the merchant navy in Bayonne, sailed to Saint-Domingue and several years later became a captain. Transferred to the Royal Navy, served on a 74-gun battleship Protecteur, incidentally studying mathematics and navigation. Then returned to the merchant navy and in 1767 aboard the ship Auguste take a cruise along the coast of Africa, near Cape St. Philip was in a shipwreck more than four months and get to Marseille, losing half the crew from scurvy.

=== Corsair and officer of the King during the American War ===
In 1776, he moved to Martinique, where at the beginning of the American War of Independence has received from Congress the right to privateering under the American flag. He served as captain of the xebec Victoire, on 17 May 1777 led by a 14-gun privateer Tigre, which took on board the 24-gun British merchant ship with a cargo valued at 500,000 pounds. Within 18 months, cruised in the West Indies, spent 40 fights and captured 211 prizes, earning a reputation as the most formidable privateer the Caribbean (British Parliament praised his head in the 2 million pounds). Following the announcement of Louis XVI of war with Britain returned to the king's service, took part in the Invasion of Dominica, where at the head of 400 buccaneers famous capture of Fort Cachacrou, for which he was appointed a lieutenant and 20 September 1778 was appointed commander of a privateer Truite.

Under the command of Admiral d'Estaing he fought in the 1 January 1779 Battle of St. Lucia, as Commander of the privateer "La Ceres". As a lieutenant 80-gun ship of the line "Le Languedoc", the flagship of Admiral d'Estaing he distinguished himself at the capture of 2 July 1779 the island of Grenada, where the head 80 grenadiers attacked the British position and took the enemy's flag, for which he was awarded the rank of captain. He participated in the unsuccessful September/October 1779 Siege of Savannah. In this heroic period Jean-Charles de Borda coined the famous slogan "always in front of Vence!" (Vence toujours devance!). In 1780, he was appointed commander of the port of Grenada, but soon falsely accused of selling marine equipment and forced to resign. Upon returning home his ship was sunk by the British, and Captain de Vence got to Lisbon and Cádiz joined a volunteer for the combined Franco-Spanish fleet under the command of Admiral d'Estaing.

=== Admiral during the Revolution ===
At the beginning of the Revolution joined the National Guard of Paris under the command of the Marquis Lafayette, 10 November 1792 reinstated in the Navy with the rank of captain (old Charges withdrawn, and the cost reimbursed). He commanded a 74-gun battleship Duquesne and a small naval squadron, directed to the Levant and Tunisia for a cargo of wheat to starving France, then managed to overcome the British blockade and bring food to Toulon, where he headed the ship of the line Heureux.

16 November 1793 – Rear Admiral (approved by the rank 2 September 1794), served in Brest, accompanied the convoy from Bordeaux along the Atlantic coast to Lorient, but was attacked by a British fleet of Admiral William Cornwallis and forced to seek refuge at Belle Isle. From 24 June to 8 December 1795, he was Commander of the Marine Division at Lorient in 1796 he was deputy squadron commander Admiral Villaret-Joyeuse, opposed the expedition of General Lazare Hoche in Ireland. After the coup of Fructidor V-18 of the year was appointed Commander of Toulon arms, took an active part in preparing the fleet for the Egyptian expedition and provided logistical base in Italy, on the island of Malta and in Egypt, 25 May 1799 - Commander of Arms Rochefort.

20 July 1800 – Maritime Prefect of Toulon, was responsible for the formation of the squadron of Admiral Honoré Joseph Antoine Ganteaume, directed to the Barbary Coast and the squadron of Admiral Charles-Alexandre Léon Durand Linois, won a 13 June 1801 victory at the Battle of Algeciras. In 1802 he was the commander of a squadron of Brest, then commanded the naval squadron Boulogne camp. On 30 September 1803 he retired. He died 11 March 1808 at the Vaulichères Castle in Tonnerre at the age of 61 years, buried in the cemetery of Saint-Pierre parish. Chevalier of St. Louis (24 January 1780), a member of the Society of Cincinnati (1783).

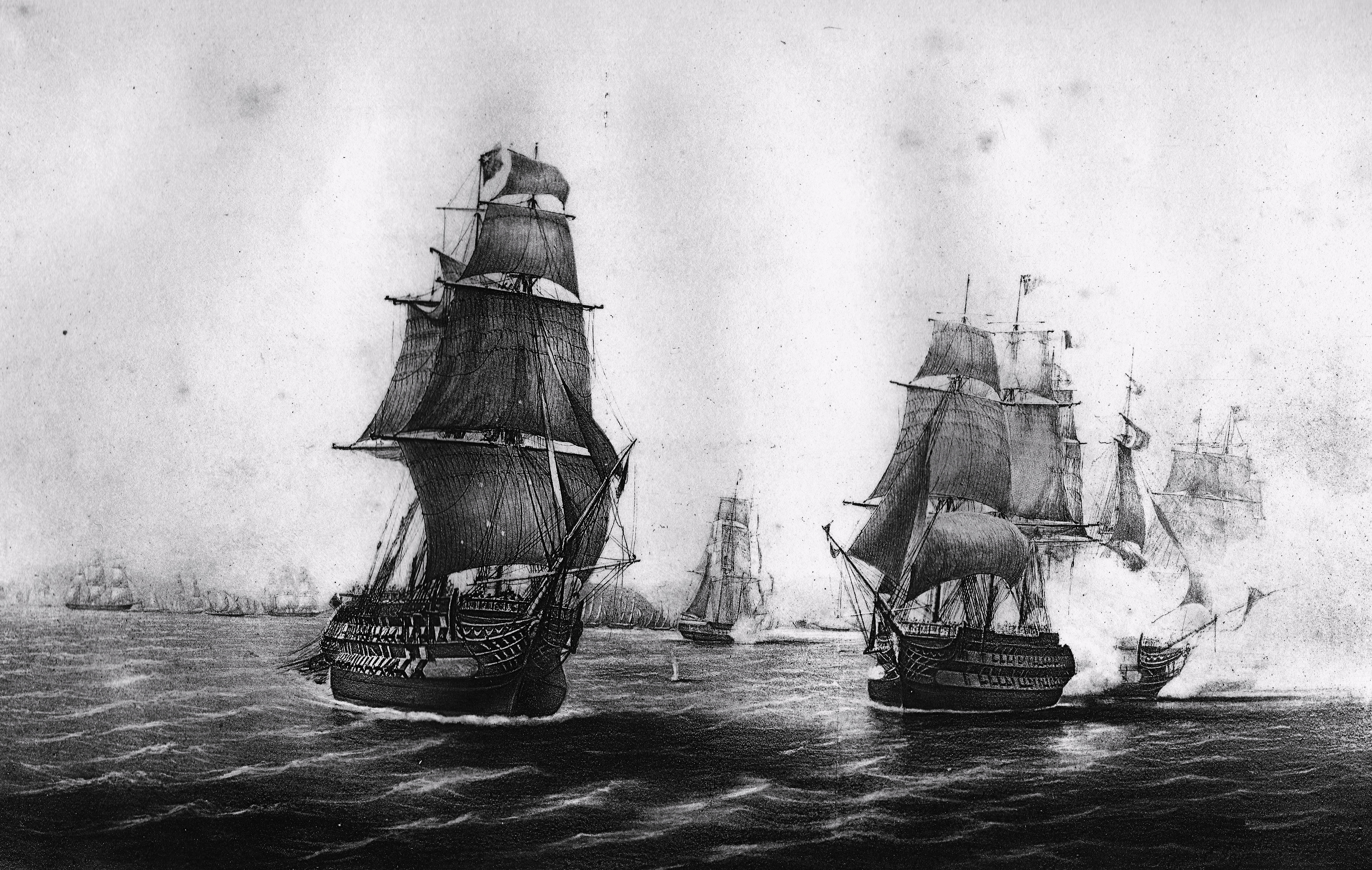
Gaspard Vence with Duquesne.

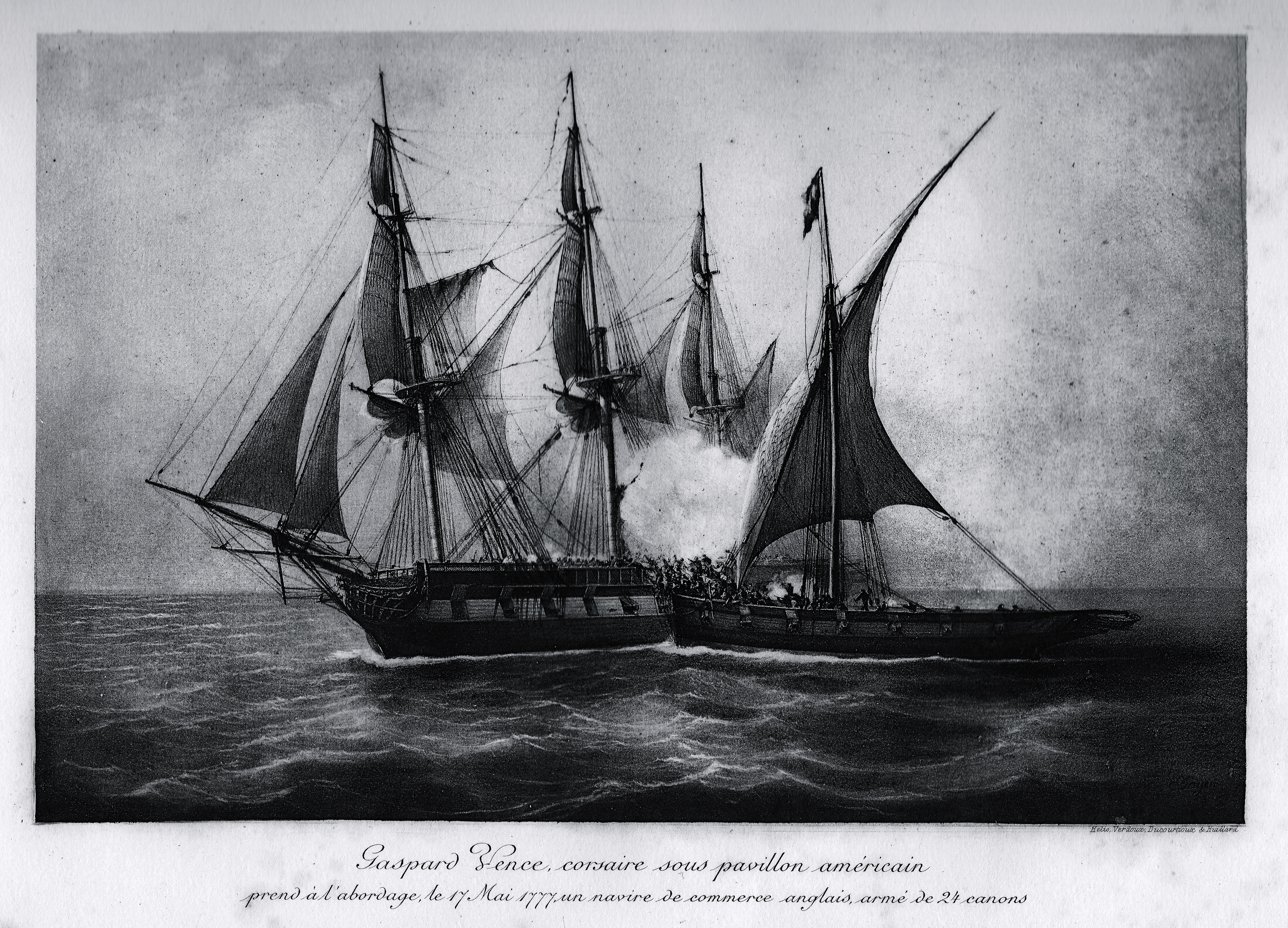
Attack on a British merchant ship on 17 May 1777
