= War of 1778 =

War of 1778 may refer to:

- The Anglo-French War (1778–83)
- The War of the Bavarian Succession
