= Agathon Marie Rene de La Bintinaye =

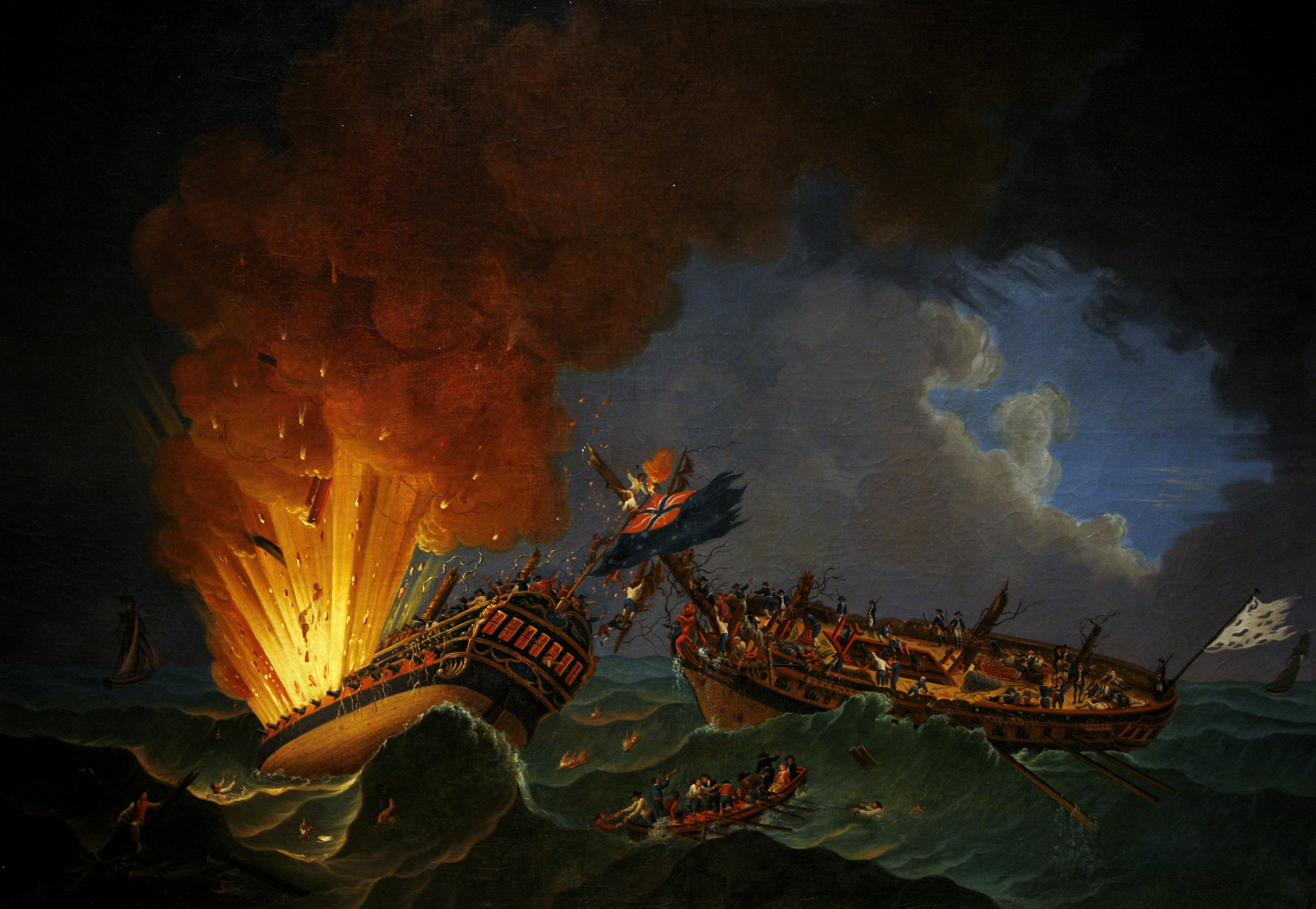
Depiction of naval battle between La Surveillante and HMS Quebec by Auguste-Louis Rossel de Cercy

Agathon Marie René de La Bintinaye (24 March 1758- December 1792) was a French naval officer, known for being central in the victory on 7 October 1779, near the island of Ouessant off the coast of Brittany, of his frigate La Surveillante over the British frigate HMS Quebec, 6 October 1779. The incident occurred during the English channel skirmishes of the Anglo-French war (1778-1783). He lost an arm during the combat. He emigrated to England in 1790 due to the French Revolution, renouncing his pension. He died in London.
