= Capture of St. Lucia =

1778 invasion of the American Revolutionary War

- Part of the American Revolutionary War and the Anglo-French War (1778–1783)
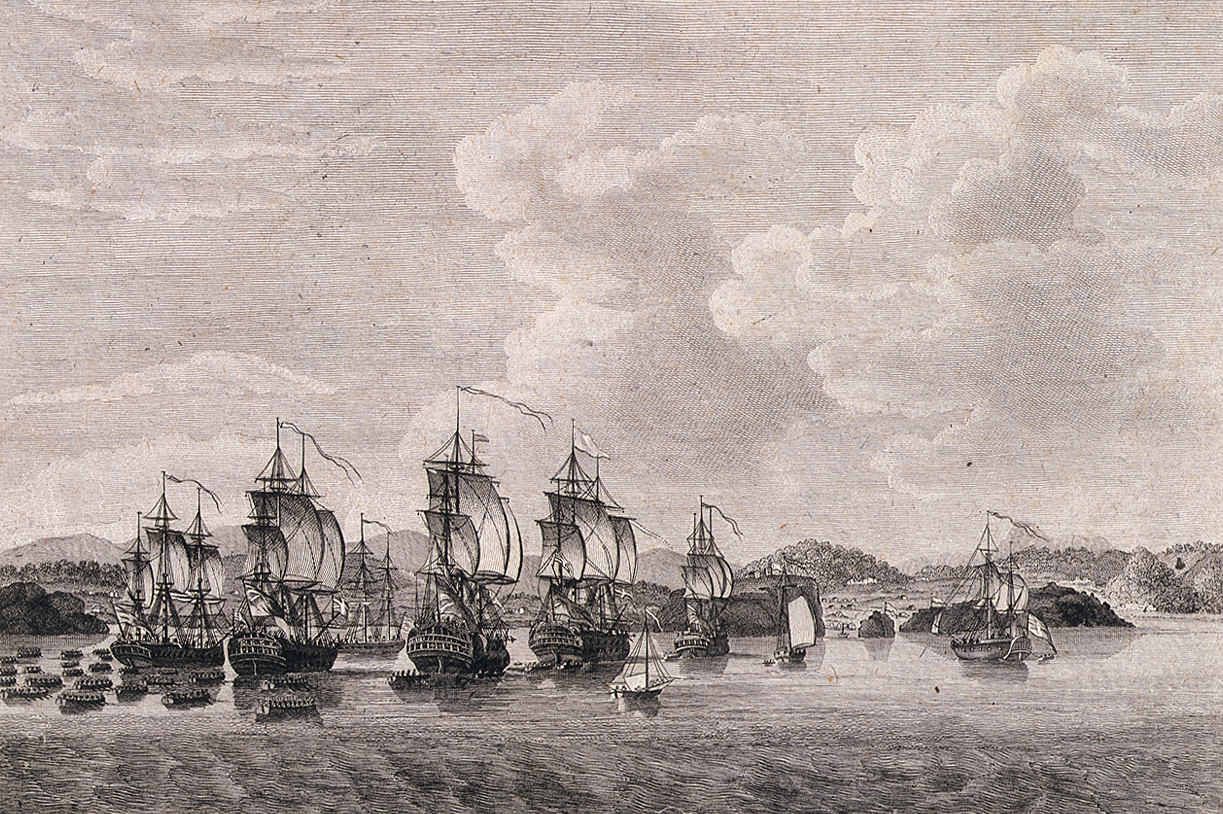
- Engraving of the capture
| Date | 18–28 December 1778 |
| Location | Saint Lucia, French West Indies 13.8817°N 60.9682°W |
| Result | British victory |

Belligerents
| Great Britain | France |

Commanders and leaders
| James Grant; William Medows | Count of Estaing; Marquis de Bouillé; Claude Anne Gui de Micoud |

Strength
| 1,400 men | 9,000 regulars and militia |

Casualties and losses
| 25 killed 255 wounded | 500 killed 1,100 wounded |

The Capture of St Lucia was the result of a campaign from 18–28 December 1778 by British land and naval forces to take over the island, which was a French colony. Britain's actions followed the capture of the British-controlled island of Dominica by French forces in a surprise invasion in September 1778. During the Battle of St. Lucia, the British fleet defeated a French fleet sent to reinforce the island. A few days later relatively inexperienced French troops were soundly defeated by entrenched British troops during the Battle of Morne de la Vigie. Realising that another British fleet would soon arrive with reinforcements, the French garrison surrendered. The remaining French troops were evacuated, and the French fleet returned to Martinique, another French colony. St. Lucia stayed in the hands of the British.

== Composition ==
=== British Troops ===
British forces in the battle included:

- 4th (The King's Own) Regiment of Foot
- 5th Regiment of Foot
- 15th Regiment of Foot
- 27th Regiment of Foot
- 28th Regiment of Foot
- 35th Regiment of Foot
- 40th Regiment of Foot
- 46th Regiment of Foot
- 49th Regiment of Foot
- 55th Regiment of Foot

=== French Troops ===
French forces in the battle included:

- Régiment d'Armagnac (2 Battalions)
- Régiment de la Martinique (2 Battalions)
- Company from Artillerie Régiment de Metz
- Militia units

== Background ==
France formally recognized the United States on February 6, 1778, with the signing of the Treaty of Alliance. Britain declared war on France on March 17, 1778 spurring France's entry into the American Revolutionary War. On September 7, 1778, the French governor of Martinique, Marquis de Bouille, launched a surprise attack on the British-held Island of Dominica, and took control of the former French colony.

On November 4, Commodore William Hotham was sent from Sandy Hook, New Jersey, to reinforce the British fleet in the West Indies. Hotham sailed with "five men of war, a bomb vessel, some frigates, and a large convoy." The convoy consisted of 59 types of transport carrying 5,000 British soldiers under Major General Grant.

Admiral Samuel Barrington, the British naval commander stationed on the Leeward Islands, joined the newly arrived Commodore Hotham on December 10 on the island of Barbados. Grant's men were not permitted to disembark and spent the next several days aboard their transports. Barrington and Hotham sailed for the French island of St. Lucia on the morning of December 12, with the idea of capturing it and using it as a base for monitoring French activity in the area.

A French fleet under Admiral Charles Henri Hector, Count of Estaing had also sailed for the West Indies, departing from the port of Boston, Massachusetts on November 4. However the French fleet was blown off course by a violent storm, preventing it from arriving in the Caribbean ahead of the British.

== Invasion ==
Upon the British ships' arrival on December 13, Major General James Grant ordered Brigadier General William Medows to land with a force of 1,400 at Grand Cul-de-Sac. This force consisted of the flank companies from several regiments and the 5th Foot. They quickly scaled the heights on the north side of the bay and captured an abandoned gun. Brigadier-General Prescott landed shortly afterward with the 27th, 35th, 40th, and 49th Regiments of Foot (approx. 2,000 troops) and guarded the bay.

On December 14, Medows' group took the fort at Morne Fortune and the capital, Castries, while Prescott's force remained in support. The third force of 1,600 remained with the fleet under the command of Brigadier General Sir H. Calder. The French governor, Claude-Anne Guy de Micoud, had evacuated into the jungle without a fight, allowing the British to occupy the Carénage Bay, three miles north of Cul de Sac, without losses.

On 13 December Admiral Barrington received news of the imminent arrival of the French Fleet. Barrington placed his transports inside the bay, but behind his battle line which took the entire evening of 14 December. By 11:00 hours the next day, most of the transports were safely behind his line

By the evening of December 14, Estaing's fleet had arrived.

=== Naval battle ===
The Battle of St. Lucia or the Battle of the Cul de Sac was fought between the British invasion fleet and French relief fleet on December 15, 1778, for control of the Island of St. Lucia.

Admiral Barrington had organised his line of battle so that Isis and his three frigates (Venus, Aurora, and Ariadne) were close to shore guarding the windward approach, and he placed his flagship, Prince of Wales, toward the leeward.^{[1]} At 11:00 hours 15 December Estaing approached St. Lucia with ten ships of the line, and was fired on by one of the shore batteries. Estaing then moved to engage Barrington from the rear, and a "warm conflict" raged between the two fleets, with the British supported by two shore batteries.^{[1]} Estaing was repulsed but succeeded in reforming his line of battle. At 16:00 hours Estaing renewed his assault by attacking Barrington's centre with twelve ships of the line. Again heavy fire was exchanged, but the French were repulsed for a second time.^{[10]}

On 16 December Estaing appeared to be preparing for a third assault against Admiral Barrington's line, but then sailed away towards the windward.^{[1]} On the evening of 16 December Estaing anchored in Gros Islet Bay with "ten frigates and twelve sail of the line, &c."^{[11]} Estaing's failure to break Barrington's line on 15 December was a major setback for the French in their efforts to expel the British from St. Lucia.

=== Battle of La Vigie ===
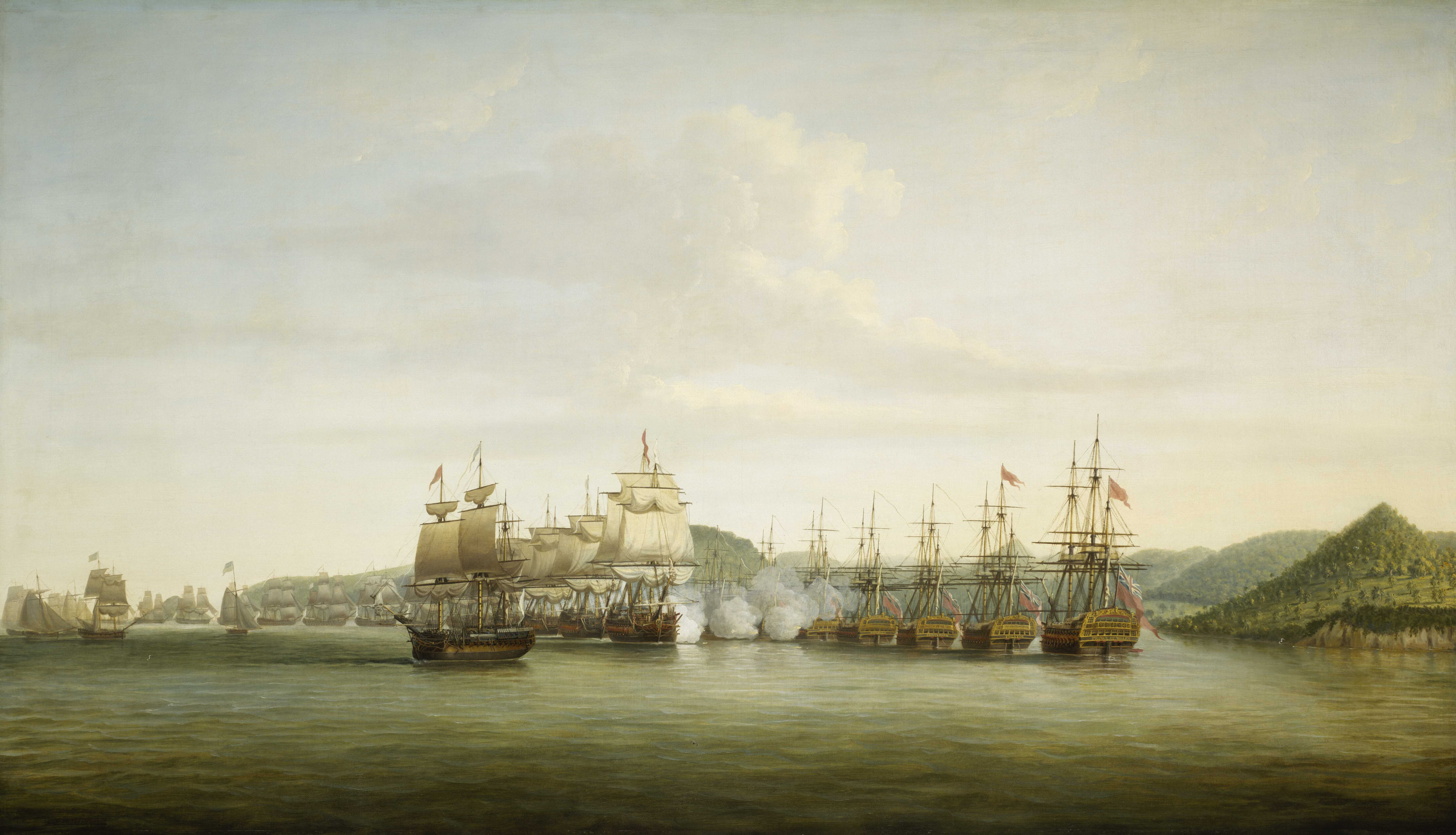
December 15, 1778. The 12 French ships of Estaing (left) attacking seven English ships of Admiral Barrington (right).

On December 18, 1778 a force of 9,000 French troops was landed near Castries, St. Lucia to attack General Medows' smaller force of 1,400. Medows ordered his troops to entrench themselves on a hill located on the neck of the Vigie peninsula. The British force consisted of the grenadier and light infantry companies of the 4th, 5th, 15th, 27th, 28th, 35th, 40th, 46th, and 55th Regiments of Foot.

The French were relatively inexperienced soldiers and were unprepared to fight against experienced, entrenched British infantry who were veterans of fighting in America. They advanced in line on the British force several times. After the third French attack, the British commander, Brigadier General Medows, who had been wounded, realised that ammunition was low and fearing that they would be over-run, addressed his men "Soldiers, as long as you have a bayonet to point against an enemy's breast, defend the colours." But the French did not attack a fourth time.

Despite being heavily outnumbered, the British had inflicted a stinging defeat on the French. French losses amounted to 400 killed and 1,100 wounded, whereas British casualties were 25 killed and 255 wounded. After the battle, so regimental tradition states, men of the 5th Regiment took white feathers from the hats of fallen French soldiers and put them in their own hats as battle trophies. Subsequently, white plumes did form part of the uniform of the 5th Northumberland Regiment.

The French forces were now in the unenviable position of having been defeated at sea and on land, and faced the prospect of another British fleet arriving shortly under the command of John Byron. The French garrison surrendered on 28 December.^{[12]}, and the remaining French troops embarked on their ships that same night. The French fleet had returning to Martinique by December 30.

== Aftermath ==
St. Lucia became a crucial base for the British fleet for the rest of the war in the Lesser Antilles. It providing a critical resupply point for British ships, and was instrumental in the British success at the Battle of the Saintes in 1782, where the French suffered a crushing defeat at the hands of Admiral Rodney.

During the peace negotiations in 1783 the British used the island as a bargaining chip during negotiations with the French. Eventually it was decided that most of the territory captured would be returned, which meant that Dominica was returned to Britain, and St Lucia was returned to France in January 1784,

== Bibliography ==
- Appleton, D Appletons' Cyclopaedia of American Biography. ,
- Jaques, Tony Dictionary of Battles and Sieges: A-E Greenwood 2006 ISBN 978-0-313-33536-5
- Marley, F. David. Wars of the Americas: A Chronology of Armed Conflict in the New World, 1492 to the Present ABC-CLIO (1998). ISBN 0-87436-837-5
