= Charles Guillaume Alexandre Bourgeois =

French physicist and painter (1759–1832)

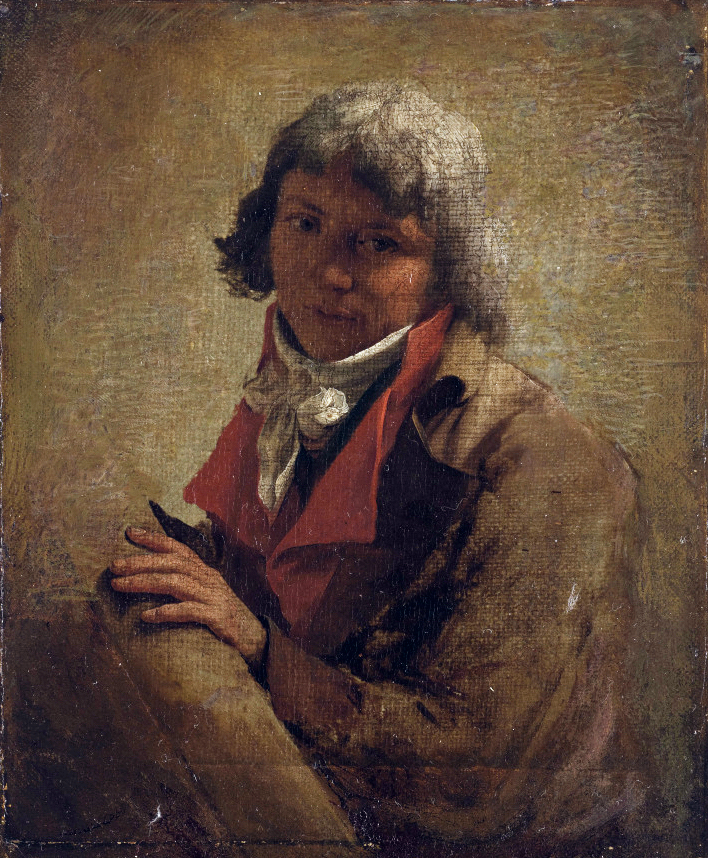
C. G. A. Bourgeois; portrait by Louis-Léopold Boilly (c.1800)

Charles Guillaume Alexandre Bourgeois (16 December 1759 – 7 May 1832) was a French physicist and painter.

As a painter, he's known by his gray camaïeux; some of his portraits are in the Musée du Louvre.

As a physicist, he was an important optician. His two main works are:

- Leçons expérimentales d'optique sur la lumière et les couleurs destinées à rétablir dans leur intégrité les faits dénaturés par Newton (1816–1817)
- Manuel d'optique expérimentale à l'usage des artistes et des physiciens (1821).
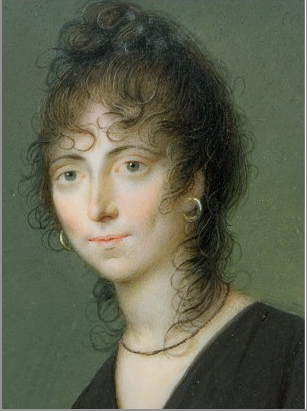
Maria Letizia Ramolino.

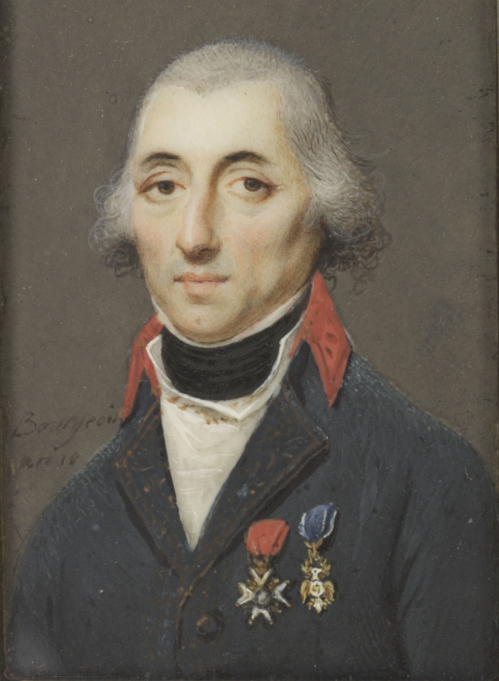
Jean Gaspard Vence, French privateer and Admiral (Musée du Louvre).
