= Anglo-French War (1778–1783) =

Military conflict between France and Great Britain from 1778 to 1783

- Part of the American Revolutionary War and the Anglo-French Wars
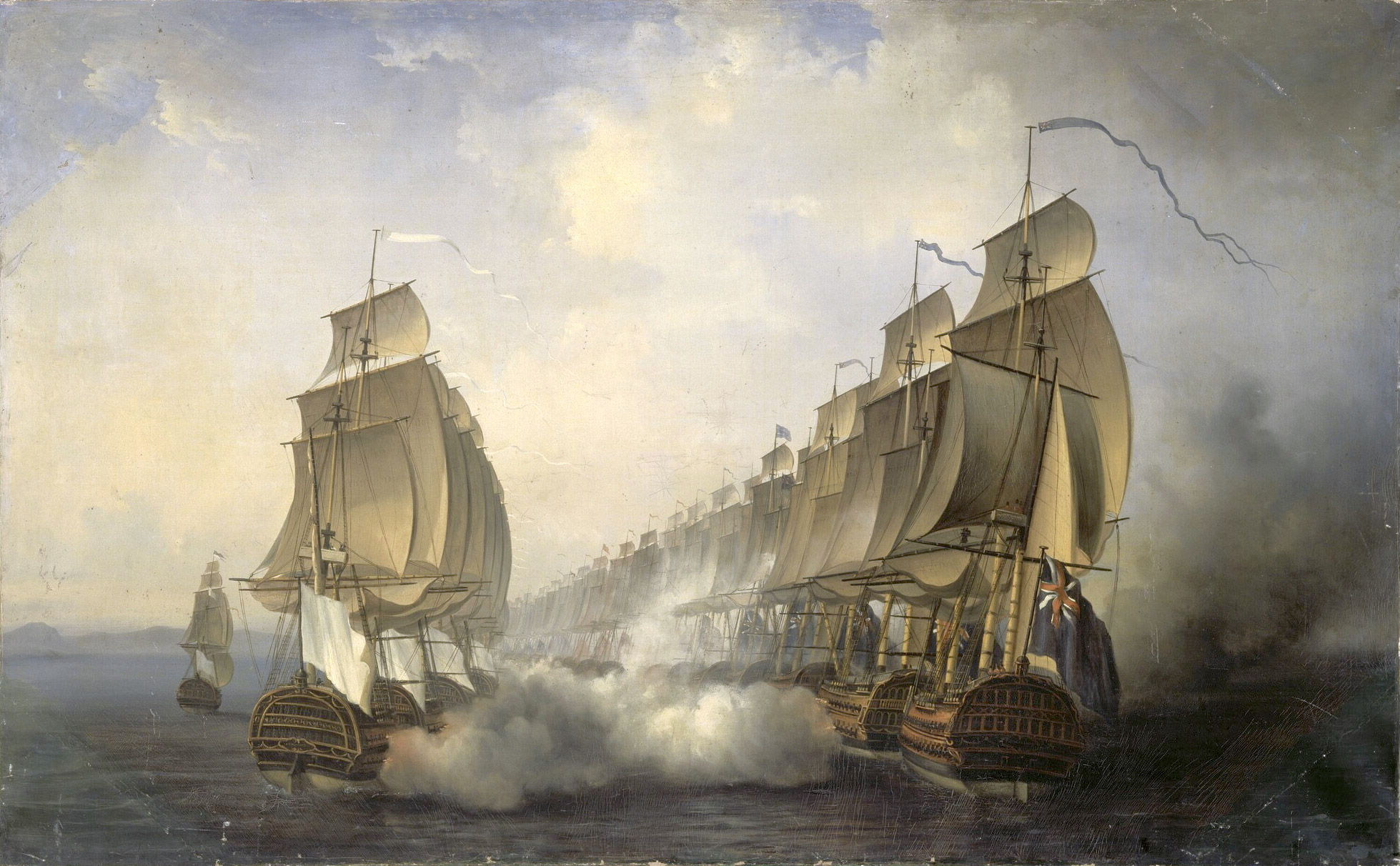
- Painting of the Battle of Cuddalore
Date	June 1778 – September 1783
Location	English Channel, Atlantic Ocean, West Indies, North America, Strait of Gibraltar, Balearic Islands, East Indies
Result	French victory Peace of Paris
Territorial changes	Great Britain cedes Tobago and Saint-Louis to France

Belligerents
France	Great Britain

Commanders and leaders
Comte d'Orvilliers; Count of Estaing; Comte de Grasse; Bailli de Suffren	Viscount Keppel; John Byron; Baron Rodney; Edward Hughes

The Anglo-French War, also known as the War of 1778 or the Bourbon War in Britain, was a military conflict fought between France and Great Britain, sometimes with their respective allies, between 1778 and 1783. (Note: In 1778, France signed the Treaty of Alliance with the United States. The Preamble sets out that the defensive, conditional military alliance, was established to defend the Franco-American trade agreement. It declared, "having this Day concluded a Treaty of Amity and Commerce…, [we] have thought it necessary… [for] strengthening those engagements…, particularly in case Great Britain in resentment of that connection." At Article 2, the Franco-American military treaty was dedicated to the specific purpose, "The essential and direct end of the present defensive alliance is to maintain effectually the liberty, sovereignty, and independence absolute and unlimited of the said United States, as well in matters of government as of commerce." It was not intended to bind the United States to overseas war with European great powers after its independence was "tacitly" achieved (Art. 8). It would have been against the US own self-interest to engage in any further foreign entanglements after the 'American War' was decisively won at the Battle of Yorktown October, 1781, and it was not obliged to do so.) As a consequence, Great Britain was forced to divert resources used to fight the American War of Independence (the rebellion by the Thirteen Colonies in North America) to theatres in Europe, India, and the West Indies, and to rely on what turned out to be the chimera of Loyalist support in its North American operations. From 1778 to 1783, with or without their allies, France and Britain fought over dominance in the English Channel, the Mediterranean, the Indian Ocean and the Caribbean.

Within days of the news of Burgoyne's surrender reaching France, King Louis XVI decided to enter into negotiations with the Americans that resulted in a formal Franco-American alliance and the French entry into the war, moving the conflict onto a global stage. Spain did not enter into the war until 1779, as an ally of France pursuant to the secret Treaty of Aranjuez. Vergennes' diplomatic moves following the French war with Britain also had material impact on the later entry of the Dutch Republic into the war, and declarations of neutrality on the part of other important geopolitical players like Russia. Opposition to the costly war was increasing, and in June 1780 contributed to disturbances in London known as the "Gordon Riots".

At the same time France assisted the Spanish in operations against British-held Menorca and Gibraltar as well as islands in the Caribbean. Menorca was taken in 1781 as were many islands in the Caribbean, though attempts to take Gibraltar were unsuccessful. The Franco-Spanish alliance, however, in 1782 encountered severe setbacks with the defeat and capture of De Grasse at the Battle of the Saintes in April as well as the failure of the Great Siege of Gibraltar in September. France, also facing financial difficulties, wanted peace which meant coercing her Spanish ally into negotiations.

In addition, a series of naval battles between Admirals Edward Hughes and Pierre André de Suffren were fought in a French attempt to displace Britain from her Indian territories. The fighting here was largely inconclusive but the French were unable to displace the British and fighting only ended upon learning of the provisional Anglo-French-Spanish peace treaties of 1783.

The Bourbon War helped secure American independence and brought an end to the First British Empire, but, like the concurrent Anglo-Spanish war, failed to achieve substantial victories over the British fleet, leading to only the minor colonial gains of Saint-Louis and Tobago, the latter of which would return to British control in 1793. The detrimental cost of participation in the American war inexorably led to the French crown's own bankruptcy six years later, setting the stage for the French Revolution.

== Background ==
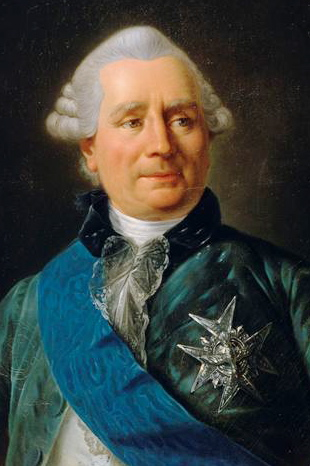
Vergennes, foreign minister of France, worried that a war over the Bavarian succession would upset his plans against Britain

Ever since the Seven Years' War, France's Foreign Ministers, beginning with Choiseul, had followed the general idea that the independence of Britain's North American colonies would be good for France and bad for Britain, and furthermore that French attempts to recover parts of New France would be detrimental to that cause. When war broke out in 1775, the Comte de Vergennes, then the Foreign Minister, outlined a series of proposals that led to secret French and also Spanish support of the rebel movement, and preparations for the war, including expansion of their navies. To further the aim of French participation in the war, Vergennes closely monitored news from North America and London, and worked to remove impediments to Spanish participation in the war. Vergennes went so far as to propose war to King Louis XVI in August 1776, but news of Howe's capture of New York City delayed that plan.

By 1777, the Thirteen Colonies' rebellion was entering its third year. John Burgoyne's surrender at the Battle of Saratoga had signalled that the struggle against the American colonies was likely to prove longer and more costly than expected. British defeat had raised the prospect of French intervention and of a European war. North's government, fearful of war with France, sought reconciliation with the American colonies and was willing to grant a fair measure of autonomy to this end, but what would be enough in 1775 would no longer suffice by 1778. North had no intention of offering independence, but in the wake of Saratoga and with the prospect of a French alliance, the Americans were unlikely to agree with lesser terms.

Although equally interested in maintaining its influence among the German states, France had a double problem. As a supporter of the rebellious British colonies in North America, it was in France's interest to avoid a continental engagement. France could do more damage to the British in North America than in Europe. The diplomatic realignment in 1756 had overthrown 200 years of French foreign policy that united the French Crown and the French populace against the House of Habsburg, arguably bringing to France massive territorial gains in repeated wars with Habsburg Austria and Habsburg Spain. A reversal of this policy in 1756 tied French foreign policy in Europe to Vienna. Despite this restructuring, there existed in the French Court at Versailles, and in France generally, a strong anti-Austrian sentiment. The diplomatic revolution of 1756, sealed in 1770 with the personal union (the diplomatic term for marriage) of Louis, the Dauphin de Viennois, and the Austrian Archduchess Marie Antoinette, was considered both a political and matrimonial mésalliance in the eyes of many Frenchmen. It flew in the face of 200 years of French foreign policy, in which the central axiom "had been hostility to the House of Habsburg". The French foreign minister, the Comte de Vergennes, maintained deep-seated hostility to the Austrians that pre-dated the alliance of 1756. He had not approved of the shift of France's traditional bonds, and considered the Austrians untrustworthy. He managed to extricate France from immediate military obligations to Austria by 1778.

== The war ==
=== Anglo-French naval crisis 1778 ===
On 4 December 1777, word reached Benjamin Franklin at Versailles that Philadelphia had fallen and that Burgoyne had surrendered. Two days later, Louis XVI assented to negotiations for an alliance. The treaty was signed on 6 February 1778, and France declared war on Britain one month later, with hostilities beginning with naval skirmishes off Ushant in June, notably the action of 17 June 1778. George III did not welcome a war with France, but he was "prepared" for it. The king believed he had tried to avoid the conflict, but "France chooses to be the Aggressor", and Britain had taken "all the steps necessary if it should end in war". He was "prepared" for armed conflict with the French by remembering British victories over that Bourbon power in the Seven Years' War.

During that conflict, France had been pinned down in Europe fighting Continental powers while Britain defeated the French navy and won victories in India, the West Indies and North America. However, Britain's strategic position at the beginning of 1778 was far different from the one she enjoyed in 1756. Gone was the alliance with the Kingdom of Prussia: in 1778 Britain was diplomatically isolated and without European allies. In the first months of this year, Britain attempted, without success, to find a Continental ally to engage the power of France. This failure produced the central strategic fact of the War of 1778: there would be no competing European campaigns to absorb France's strength. European isolation was irrelevant in peacetime, but Britain was at serious disadvantage without European allies in war against France.

Unlike previous wars against the French, this one would offer Britain few, if any, strategic options like choosing to fight in Europe as opposed to one in Asia and America. France and Britain fought over the control of the Channel, as one of the episodes of the globalised warfare that followed the start of the hostilities in 1778. Early in the war, the first fleet action in European waters was fought on 27 July 1778, 100 miles west of Ushant, an island at the mouth of the Channel. The two French and British battle fleets, of equal strength at 30 ships each, came to battle each other violently for several hours with neither side scoring a clear victory. The battle had been described since then as indecisive in its results.

=== Caribbean, 1778–1779 ===
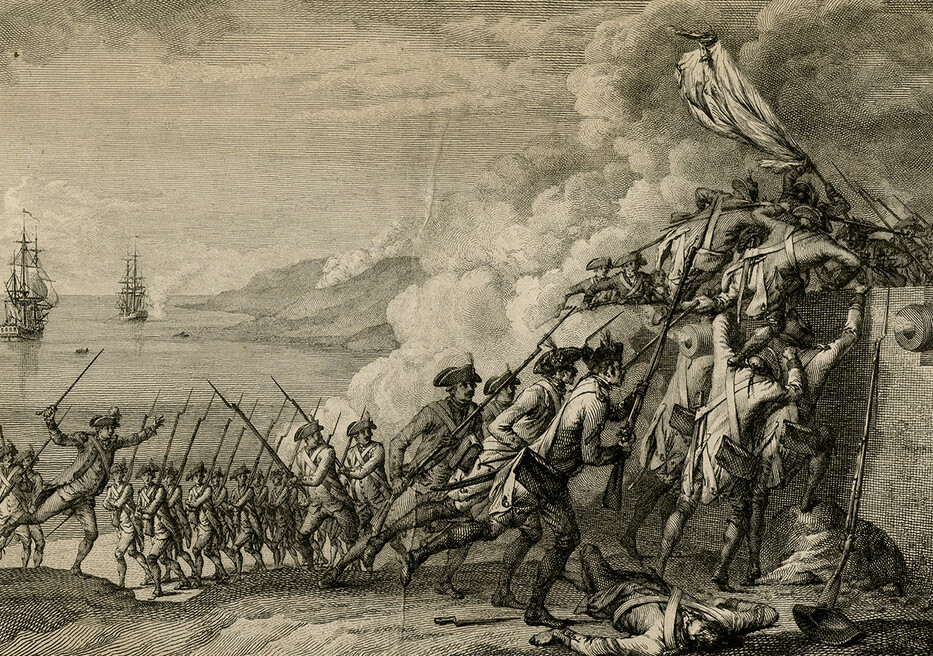
The French capture of Dominica in 1778

The strategic and operational situation in the West was complex. It consisted of battles for naval supremacy, raids on enemy convoys and colonies, and sorties in support of the sides fighting the War of the American Independence. The French blockaded Britain's most important sugar producers, Barbados and Jamaica, cutting them off from food and supplies, with thousands dying from starvation and disease. Colonial militias played only limited supporting roles and more French and British troops died from the Caribbean climate and disease than from fighting. One key territory that was of particular interest was the West Indies island of Dominica, which lay between French-held Martinique and Guadeloupe, and had been captured by Britain in 1761. Recapture of the island would improve communication among the islands, and deny the use of Dominican ports to privateers who preyed on French shipping. In August 1778, François Claude Amour, the marquis de Bouillé, the French governor-general of Martinique, received word that war had been declared.

The French frigate Concorde reached Martinique on August 17 with orders from Paris to take Dominica at the earliest opportunity, and de Bouillé made immediate plans for such an operation. He had maintained contacts in the Dominican population, which had remained largely French during the years of British administration. As a result, he had an accurate picture of the condition of the Dominican defences, and knew that the island's garrison numbered fewer than "fifty soldiers fit for duty". He was also concerned with the whereabouts of the British Leeward Islands fleet of Admiral Samuel Barrington, which significantly exceeded his in military power. Unbeknown to de Bouillé, Barrington, who had only recently assumed his post, was under orders to retain most of his fleet at Barbados until further instructions were received. The British regular forces on the island, which in total numbered about 100, were distributed amongst defences in the capital Roseau, the hills that overlooked it, and at Cachacrou.

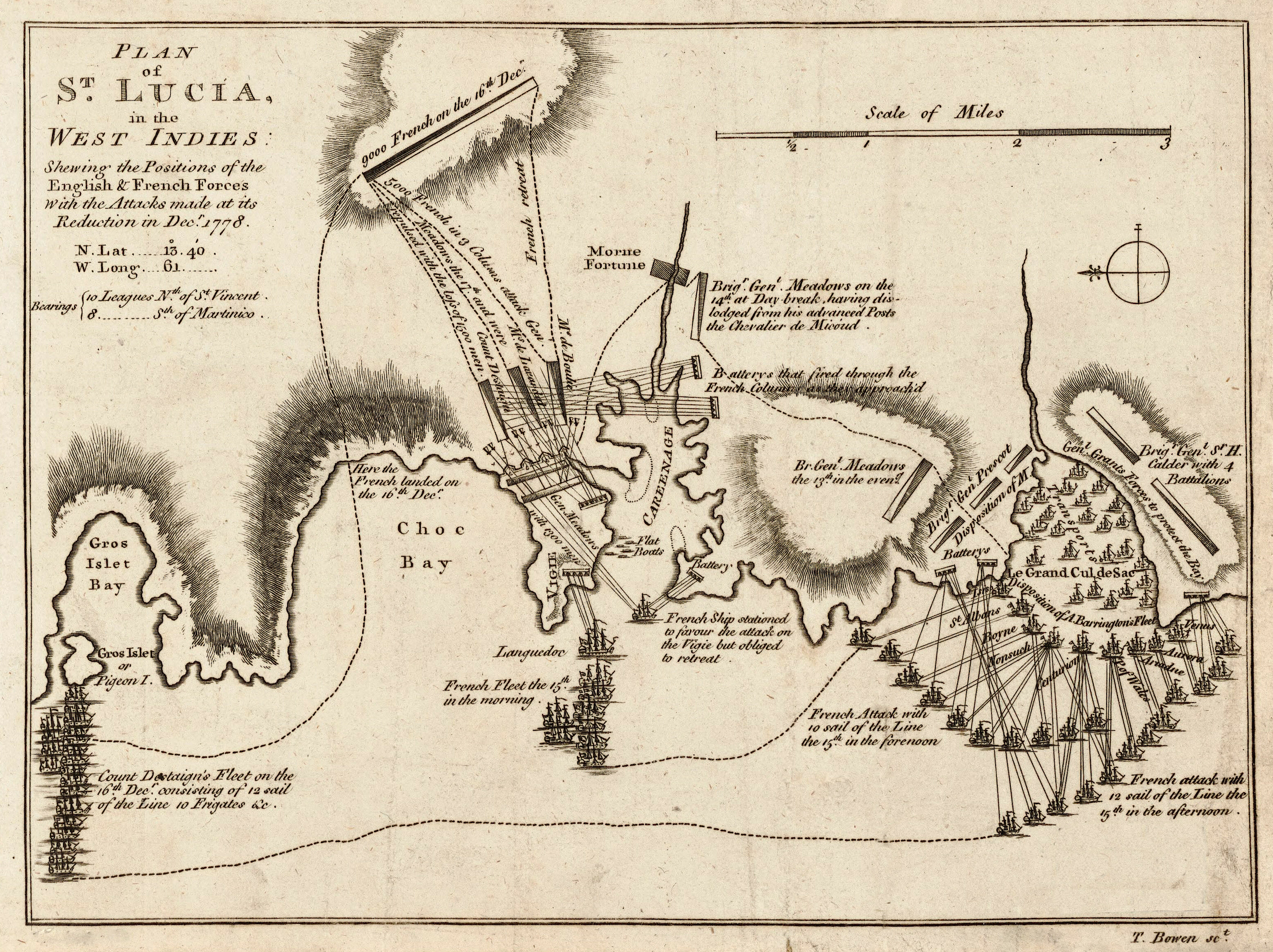
Plan of St. Lucia showing the positions of English and French forces and the attacks which led to its capture in December 1779

De Bouillé carefully maintained a façade of peace in his dealings with Dominican authorities while he began preparing his forces on Martinique. On 2 September he and Lieutenant Governor Stuart signed an agreement that formally prohibited privateering crews to plunder. The next day de Bouillé sent one of his officers to Dominica to see whether a Royal Navy frigate was still anchored in Prince Rupert's Bay (near present-day Portsmouth). Stuart, suspicious of the man, had him questioned and then released. On 5 September de Bouillé was informed that the frigate had sailed for Barbados. He struck fast, defeating the British at Dominica in September 1778. De Bouillé left a garrison of 800 (700 French regulars and 100 free black militia) on the island, turned its command over to the Marquis de Duchilleau, and returned to Martinique. These events were the first in a series of military actions resulting in the change of control of Caribbean islands during the war, in which De Bouillé was often involved.

News of Dominica's fall was received with surprise in London; considering that a single ship of the line might have prevented the attack, Admiral Barrington was widely blamed for the loss, and criticised for adhering too closely to his orders. In December 1778, a French fleet of 12 ships of the line and several smaller vessels under Admiral Charles Henri Hector, Count of Estaing arrived in the West Indies. At about the same time a British fleet under Admiral William Hotham also arrived, augmenting the fleet of Admiral Samuel Barrington. The orders and reinforcements whose late arrival had held Admiral Barrington at Barbados were to launch an attack on French-held St. Lucia, which the British then captured in December 1778. Despite Estaing's attempt at relief, the British used St. Lucia to monitor the major French base at Martinique, where Estaing was headquartered.

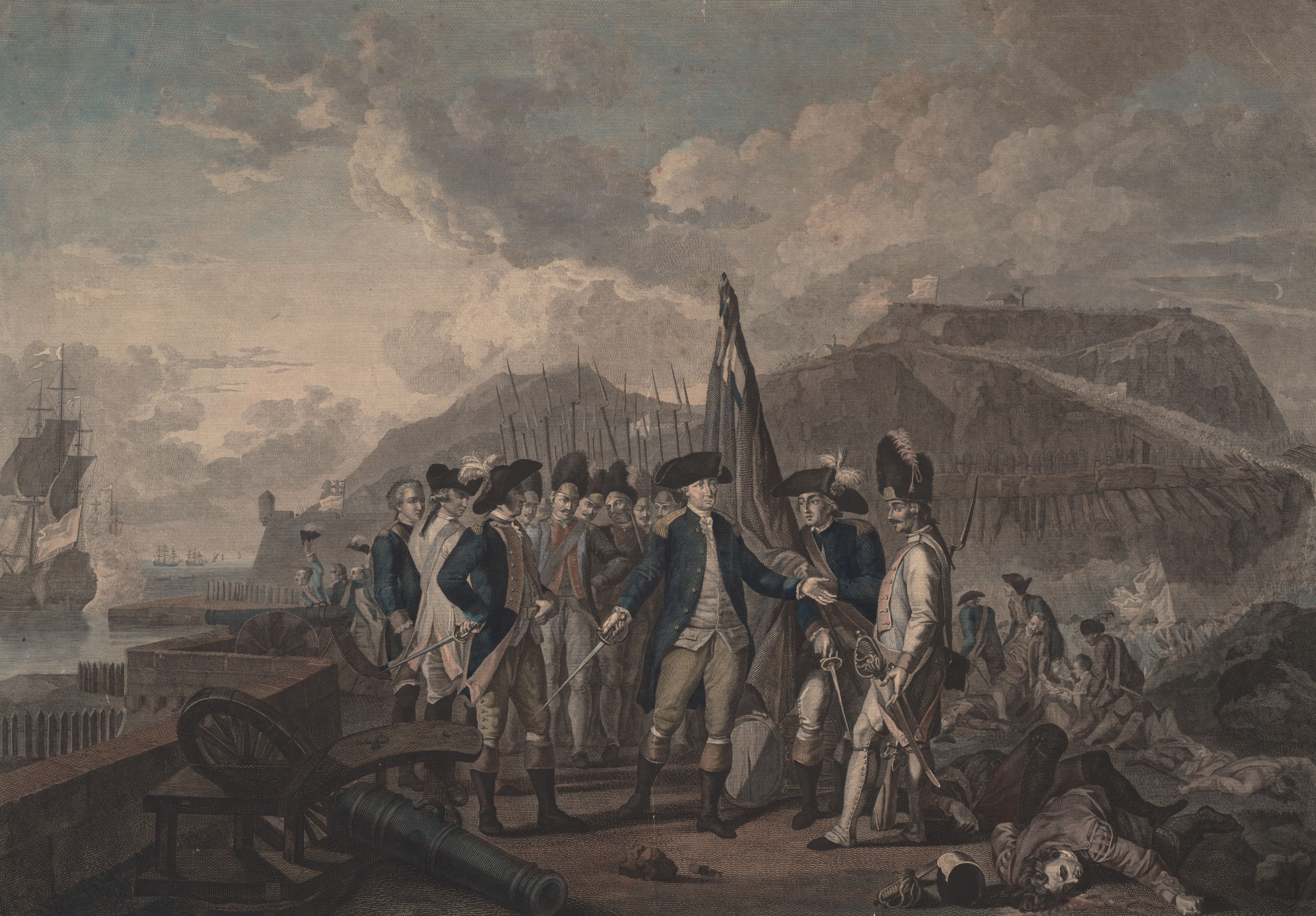
The French capture of Grenada in 1779

The British fleet was further reinforced in January 1779 by ten ships of the line under Admiral John Byron, who assumed command of the British Leeward Islands station. Throughout the first half of 1779 both fleets received further reinforcements, after which the French fleet was superior to that of the British. Furthermore, Byron departed St. Lucia on 6 June in order to provide escort services to British merchant ships gathering at St. Kitts for a convoy to Europe, leaving Estaing free to act. Estaing and de Bouillé, seized the opportunity to begin a series of operations against nearby British possessions. Their first target was the isle of Saint Vincent, south of St. Lucia. It fell on 18 June, and Estaing turned his attention to other islands. He had hoped to capture Barbados, a key British possession, but after making no progress against the prevailing easterly trade winds, he turned his attention instead to Grenada. The French fleet arrived off Grenada on 2 July, and stormed its main defences beginning late on 3 July. Terms of capitulation were agreed on the 4th.

The first large expedition to the North was undertaken in 1779 by Estaing. In the attempt to invade the British-occupied Savannah, the French brought 20 ships-of-the-line and 3,000 troops in transports to Georgia. Although Washington failed to cooperate with his allies, being fixated on attacking the British in New York City, Estaing landed the troops in aid to the Americans before he returned to France, as he had been ordered to do. On 9 October 1779, in concert with a contingent of the Continental Army, the French admiral initiated an assault on the besieged city. The well-fortified British army repulsed the invaders; Estaing was seriously wounded and had to sail for Europe. Despite a correct strategic concept, allied cooperation eluded successful operational implementation.

=== East Indies, 1778–1780 ===
One clear result of the renewal of the Anglo-French contest in the East Indies between 1778 and 1783 was a greater appreciation by the British of the strategic needs of their newly acquired possessions in Asia. The superimposition of a global struggle between European powers upon several localised Indian wars did unnerve the British East India Company and seriously embarrass its presidencies. Furthermore, the war exposed the rival geo-political ambitions of the French and these in turn provoked the more stolid, unreflecting British to formulate their own logic of empire. When word reached India in 1778 that France had entered the war, the company moved quickly to capture French colonial outposts there, notably capturing Pondicherry after two months of siege.

In March 1779 the British forces won Mahé ("Mahey") from the French; the Nairs ("Nayhirs"), a Hindu community took this opportunity to rebel against Haidar Ali's rule. The uprising was supported, if not instigated, by the British but suppressed, and the French retook Mahé in 1780 with Haidar Ali's aid.

=== Spain enters the war, 1779–1780 ===
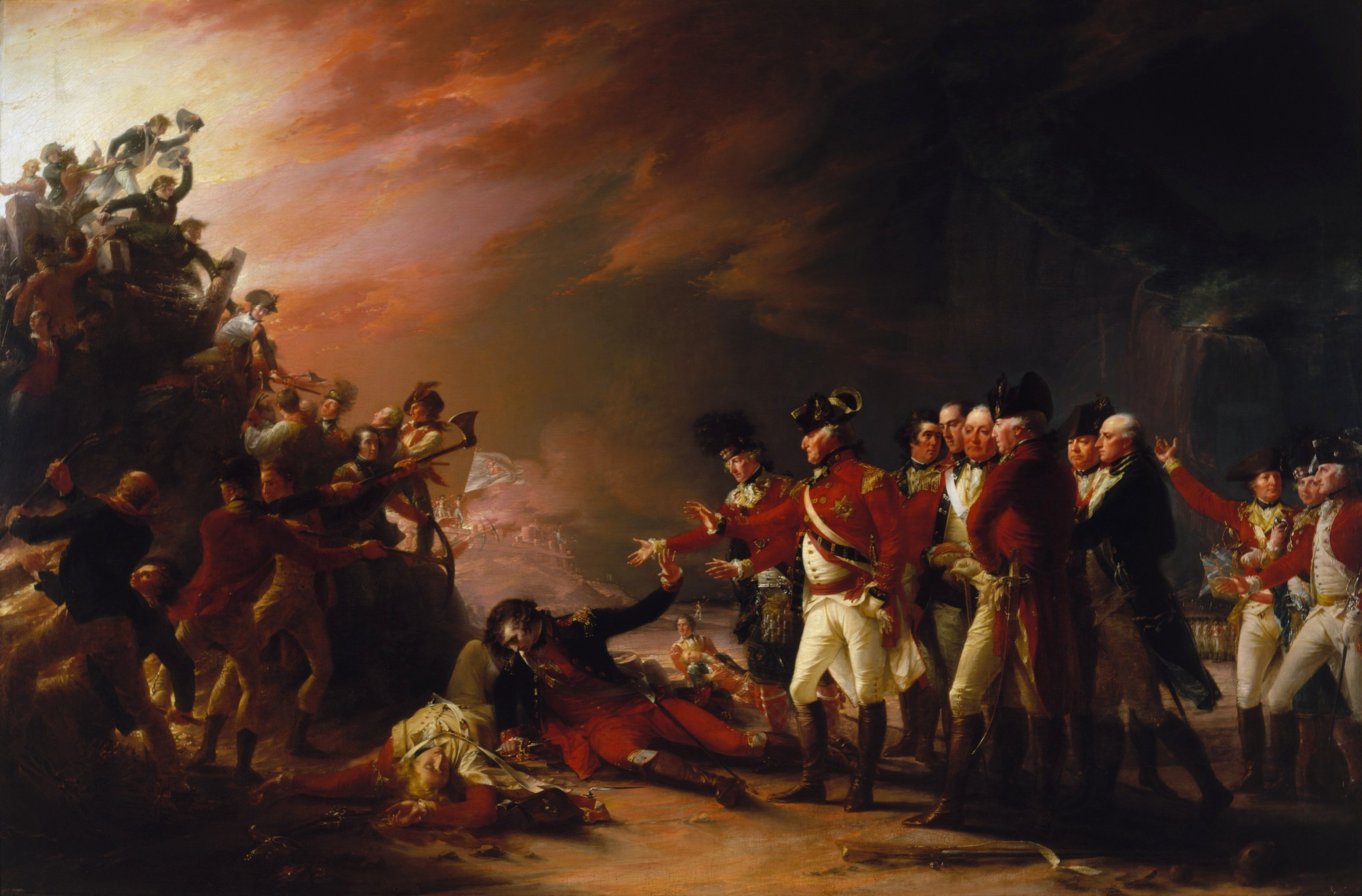
The Sortie made by the Garrison of Gibraltar in the Morning of the 27 of November 1781 by John Trumbull, depicting a British attack that occurred during the Great Siege of Gibraltar

In April 1779 France and Spain signed the Convention of Aranjuez, which laid out a summary of Bourbon War aims. Spain sought to recover Gibraltar and Minorca, Mobile and Pensacola in Florida, and to expel the British from Spanish Central America by ending their right to cut logwood in the Bay of Honduras and the coast of Campeche. France declared that her aims were to expel the British from the Newfoundland fishery, to end restrictions on French sovereignty over Dunkirk, to regain free trade in India, to recover Senegal and Dominica, and to restore the Treaty of Utrecht provisions relating to the Anglo-French commerce.

Spain began the Anglo-Spanish War (1779–1783) with one of the goals of recovering Gibraltar, which had been lost to England in 1704. Its garrison included troops from Britain and the Electorate of Hanover. Spain formally began the siege in June 1779, the fourteenth and longest of Gibraltar, with the Spanish establishing a land blockade around the Rock of Gibraltar. The Spanish strategy combined a steady bombardment of Gibraltar from the land with seaborne attacks and attempts to cut off the supply lines to Morocco, planning to retake Gibraltar by blockading and starving out its garrison. The matching naval blockade was comparatively weak, and the British discovered that small fast ships could evade the blockaders, while slower and larger supply ships generally could not. By late 1779, however, supplies in Gibraltar had become seriously depleted, and its commander, General George Eliott, appealed to London for relief.

A supply convoy was organised, and in late December 1779 a large fleet sailed from Britain under the command of Admiral Sir George Brydges Rodney. Although Rodney's ultimate orders were to command the West Indies fleet, he had secret instructions to first resupply Gibraltar and Minorca and on 4 January 1780 the fleet divided, with ships headed for the West Indies sailing westward. This left Rodney in command of nineteen ships of the line which were to accompany the supply ships to Gibraltar.

The supply convoy sailed into Gibraltar on January 19, driving the smaller blockading fleet to retreat to the safety of Algeciras. Rodney arrived several days later, and the British garrison was heartened by the arrival of the supplies and the presence of Prince William Henry. Upon the return of the ships from Minorca, Rodney put to sea again on February 13, for the West Indies, the detachment from the Channel fleet accompanied him three days' sail on his way, and then parted for Britain with the prizes. On this return voyage it fell in with fifteen French supply vessels, convoyed by two sixty-fours, bound for the Île-de-France, in the Indian Ocean, one of the ships of war, the Protée, and three of the storeships were taken.

In North America, the Spanish governor of Louisiana, Bernardo de Gálvez, attacked the south part of the United States and took British garrisons by surprise.

=== Attempted Invasion of Great Britain, 1779 ===
In order to help relieve pressure on other fronts, France and its new ally, Spain, planned and attempted to execute an invasion of Great Britain in late summer of 1779. The action, referring to a previous Spanish invasion attempt, the Spanish Armada of 1588, was called the Armada of 1779. The proposed plan was to seize the Isle of Wight and then capture the British naval base of Portsmouth. The combined French and Spanish fleet boasted 66 ships of the line, whose goal was to sweep the Royal Navy from the Channel in preparation for the landing of 30–40,000 troops who had been readied for the invasion.

Despite superiority of numbers over the British fleet in the English Channel, the combined French-Spanish operation failed due to a comedy of errors of navigation, miscommunication, disease, food shortages, and bad weather. On 3 September, having failed to decisively engage the British fleet, which had by then taken up a strong defensive position in The Solent, the leaders of the great Armada decided to retreat with as many as 8,000 being afflicted with disease. The invasion caused alarm in Britain but George III was encouraged by its failure.

=== North America, 1780–1781 ===
With Estaing back to France, Washington got stuck in New Jersey, while asking for a continuous French naval presence in North American waters. When in July 1780 the Lieutenant General Comte de Rochambeau, arrived in Newport with an army of 6,000 men, he described the situation: "in any operation, and under all circumstances, a decisive naval superiority is to be considered as a fundamental principle, and the basis upon which every hope of success must ultimately depend". The Dutch were helping the American rebels by selling them guns and gunpowder from their ports in the Caribbean. The British used this as a pretext to declare war on the Netherlands in December 1780. Admiral Rodney spent the years of 1780 and 1781 in the Caribbean to plundering and sacking the Dutch Caribbean islands.

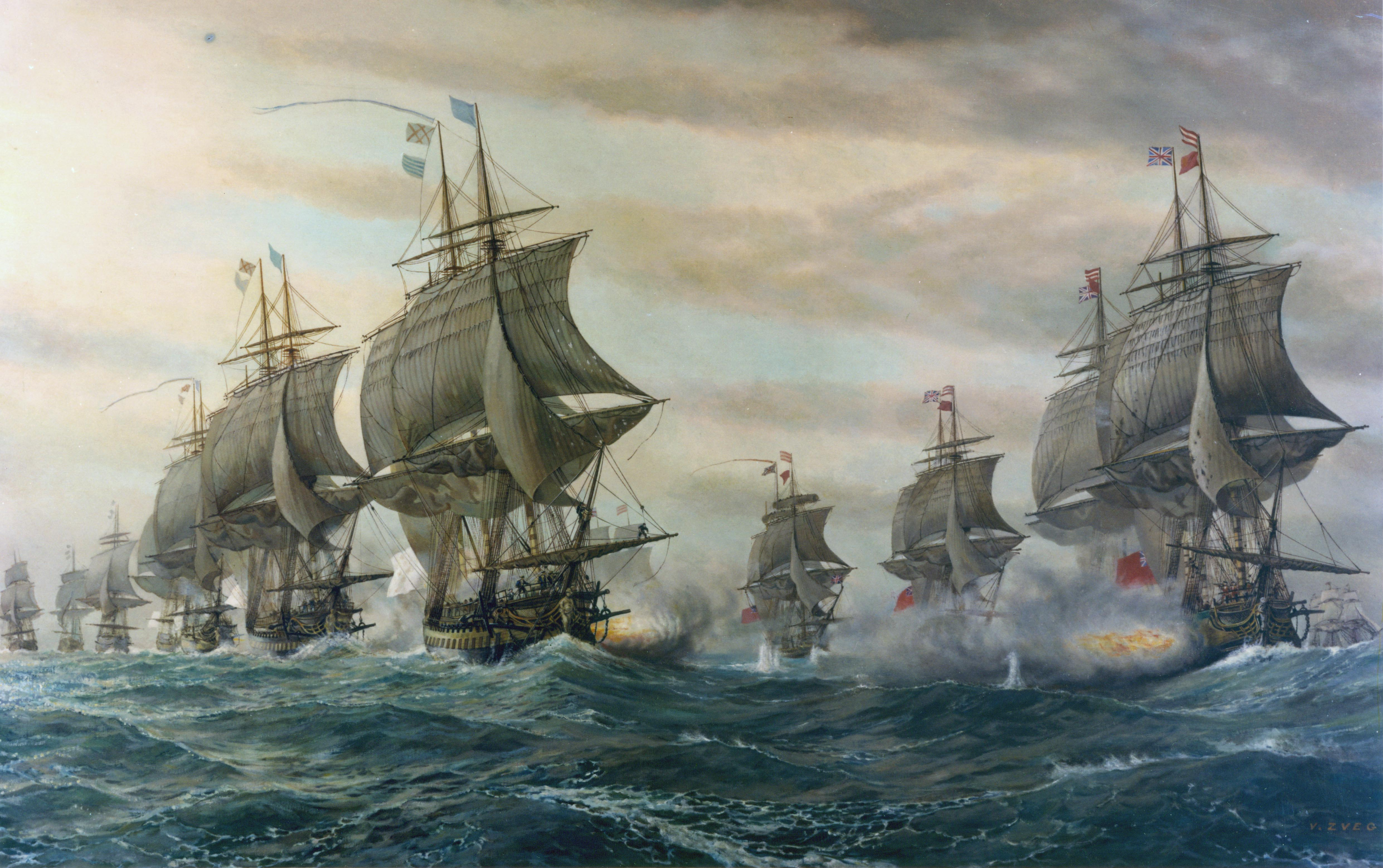
Battle of the Virginia Capes

By December 1780, the War in North America had reached a critical point. The Continental Army had suffered major defeats earlier in the year, with its southern armies either captured or dispersed in the loss of Charleston and the Battle of Camden in the south, while the armies of George Washington and the British commander-in-chief for North America, Sir Henry Clinton watched each other around New York City in the north. The national currency was virtually worthless, public support for the war, about to enter its sixth year, was waning, and army troops were becoming mutinous over pay and conditions.

French military planners had to balance competing demands for the 1781 campaign. After a series of unsuccessful American attempts at cooperation (leading to unsuccessful attempts on Newport, Rhode Island and Savannah, Georgia), they decided more involvement in North America was necessary. They also needed to coordinate their actions with Spain, as there was potential interest in making an assault on the British stronghold of Jamaica. It turned out that the Spanish were not interested in operations against Jamaica until after they had dealt with an expected British attempt to reinforce besieged Gibraltar, and merely wanted to be informed of the movements of the West Indies fleet.

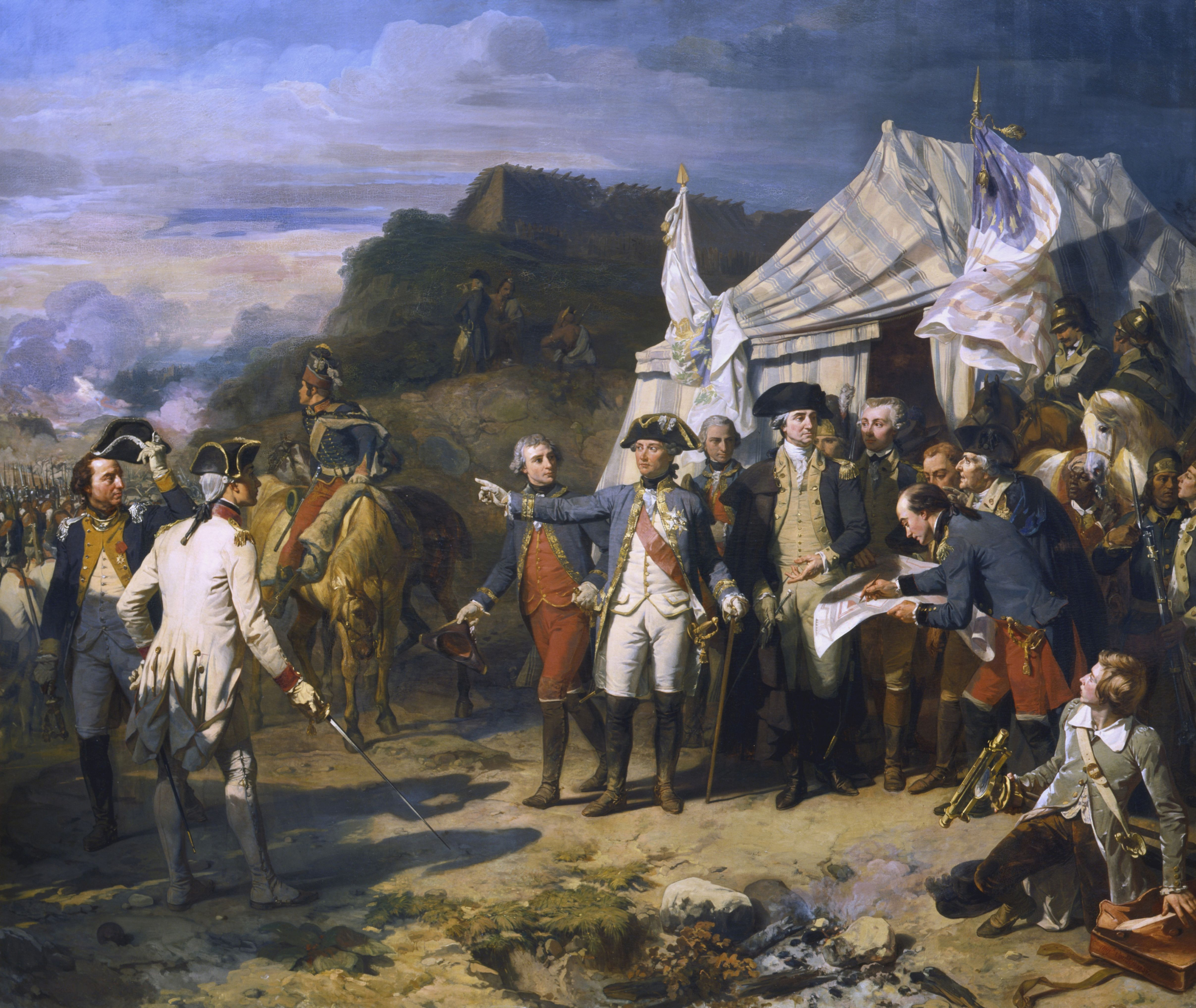
Rochambeau and Washington ordering at Yorktown; Lafayette, bareheaded, appears behind

As the French fleet was preparing to depart Brest in March 1781, several important decisions were made. The West Indies fleet, led by the Comte de Grasse, after operations in the Windward Islands, was directed to go to Cap-Français (present-day Cap-Haïtien) to determine what resources would be required to assist Spanish operations. Due to a lack of transports, France also provided six million livres to support the American war effort beyond of providing additional troops. The French fleet at Newport was given a new commander, the Comte de Barras. De Barras was ordered to take the Newport fleet to harass British shipping off Nova Scotia and Newfoundland, and the French army at Newport was ordered to combine with Washington's army outside New York.

In orders that were deliberately not fully shared with General Washington, De Grasse was instructed to assist in North American operations after his stop at Cap-Français. The French general, the Comte de Rochambeau was instructed to tell Washington that de Grasse might be able to assist, without making any commitment. (Washington learned from John Laurens, stationed in Paris, that de Grasse had discretion to come north.)

De Grasse received these letters in July at roughly the same time Cornwallis was preparing to occupy Yorktown, Virginia. De Grasse concurred with Rochambeau and subsequently sent a dispatch indicating that he would reach the Chesapeake at the end of August but that agreements with the Spanish meant he could only stay until mid-October. The arrival of his dispatches prompted the Franco-American army to begin a march for Virginia. De Grasse reached the Chesapeake as planned, and his troops were sent to assist Lafayette's army in the blockade of Cornwallis. A British fleet sent to confront de Grasse's control of the Chesapeake was defeated by the French on September 5 at the Battle of the Chesapeake, and the Newport fleet delivered the French siege train to complete the allied military arrival. The Siege of Yorktown and following surrender by Cornwallis on October 19 were decisive in ending major hostilities in North America.

In March 1782 the British House of Commons had voted in parliament with a No offensive war against America as a result of the surrender of Yorktown. News of the surrender of Yorktown, Menorca and losses in the West Indies then brought down the government. The new government under Marquess of Rockingham soon began the negotiations leading to the Peace of Paris. Although offensive operations against America had ended, the war continued elsewhere in the West and East Indies as well as Gibraltar. The appointment of Lord Shelburne after Rockingham's death in July forced another change in government. Nevertheless, Shelburne accepted American independence without preconditions. Although a French naval expedition had destroyed British trading posts in Hudson Bay during the summer of 1782, no territory had actually been captured.

=== Britain and the Atlantic 1780–1782 ===
In Britain opposition to the costly war was increasing, and in June 1780 contributed to disturbances in London known as the Gordon riots.

The war in the Atlantic had reached a stalemate by 1780. In January 1781 France failed to their attempt to invade Jersey, Channel Islands, their landing force being defeated in the battle of Jersey. The French Navy soon encountered a series of defeats in her home waters by the Royal Navy which would prove to be costly not just militarily but also financially. First at Ushant in December 1781 where a number of transports escorted by ships under the Comte de Guichen were captured by a Royal Navy fleet led by Richard Kempenfelt led to the loss of many French soldiers. In April the following year the larger third battle of Ushant took place in April where a Royal Navy fleet led by Samuel Barrington captured two valuable French ships of the line but also took two-thirds of its escorting convoy. This defeat was severe – the financial damage on the French treasury was significant, and was also a blow to the French forces operating in the Indian Ocean. More defeats followed with the loss of the brand new frigate Hébé in the action of 4 September 1782 where Chevalier de Vigny was condemned to fifteen years in prison – the case of his rank and service being declared as unfit for service. The next action proved to be the last naval battle of the American Revolutionary war where a Franco-American convoy was defeated by James Luttrell off Ferrol on 12 December 1782. The convoy was part of Pierre Beaumarchais's supply chain to the American colonists.

=== Caribbean, 1781–1783 ===
In October 1781, a plan had been worked out between de Grasse, commander of the French fleet in the West Indies, and Francisco Saavedra de Sangronis, General Bureau for the Spanish Indies, court representative and aide to the Spanish Governor of Louisiana, Bernardo de Gálvez. The strategic objectives of this plan were to guide the Franco-Spanish military forces in the West Indies to accomplish the following objectives:

- To aid the Americans and defeat the British naval squadron at New York,
- The capture of the British Windward Islands, and
- The conquest of Jamaica.

This plan became known as the De Grasse – Saavedra Convention and the first objective was essentially met with the surrender of the British army under General Cornwallis at the Siege of Yorktown in September 1781. De Grasse and his fleet had played a decisive part in that victory, after which they then sailed to the Caribbean. On arrival in Saint Domingue November 1781 he was given news that the plan was given the go ahead: to proceed with the conquest of Jamaica.

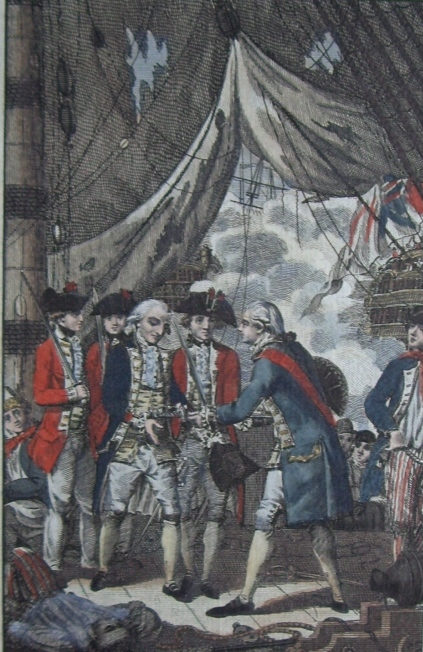
A 1785 engraving of Amdiral de Grasse surrendering to Admrial Rodney on board the French flagship Ville de Paris

Jamaica was the most profitable British possession in the New World, in particular the commodity that stood out the most was sugar; it was more valuable to the British economy than the thirteen American colonies combined. In a letter from King George III to Lord Sandwich he declared that he would risk protecting Britain's important Caribbean islands at the risk of Britain herself, and this was strategy implemented in 1779. Sugar made up 20% of all British imports and was worth five times as much as tobacco. As well as the gradual expulsion of the British from the West Indies by the French and Spanish, the conquest was to force a massive blow on the British economy. The invasion itself though was perceived in the courts at Paris and Madrid as an alternative to the Spanish and French attempts to take Gibraltar which for two years had been a costly disaster.

While de Grasse waited for reinforcements to undertake the Jamaica campaign, he captured St. Kitts in February 1782. The rest of the Windward Islands (Antigua, St Lucia, and Barbados) still remained under British control, while Admiral George Rodney arrived in the Caribbean theatre the following month, having brought reinforcements. These included seventeen ships of the line, and gave the British a slight advantage in number.

On 7 April 1782, de Grasse set out from Martinique with 35 ships of the line, including two 50-gun ships and a large convoy of more than 100 cargo ships, to meet with a Spanish fleet consisting of 12 ships of the line. In addition de Grasse was to rendezvous with 15,000 troops at Saint Domingue earmarked for the conquest by landing on Jamaica's North coast. Rodney on learning of this then sailed from St Lucia in pursuit now with 36 ships of the line the following day.

The British ships by this time had hulls which had gone through a process known as copper sheathing; found to be a practicable means of protecting them from marine growth and fouling as well as salt water corrosion. The result of this was that their speed and sailing performance as a whole in good wind improved dramatically.

Between 9 April 1782 and 12 April 1782 a British fleet under Admiral George Brydges Rodney engaged and defeated a French fleet under the Comte de Grasse at the battle of the Saintes. French losses were huge; nearly 8,000 to 9,000 men killed wounded or captured and lost five ships of the line, four of which were captured. French and Spanish plans for an invasion of Jamaica were thus cancelled. The British fleet made its way to Jamaica, from where Rodney ordered Hood to seek out any disabled or damaged French ships that had escaped the battle. Hood's division of thirteen ships set out towards San Domingo, and while travelling through the Mona Passage, came across and captured a number of French ships which had become separated before the battle of the Saintes and were on their way to Cap-Français.

News of the battle reached France in June and was met with despair. The defeat along with the loss of the Ville de Paris was a devastating blow to French King Louis XVI. The navy minister the Marquis de Castries greeted the news as 'a grim disaster'. The Comte De Vergennes felt undermined in the confidence of the French navy.

By the end of 1782 the French had been on defensive in the Caribbean, which signalled a stalemate of the seas. Nevertheless, the Royal navy was able to conduct a blockade off Cap Francois and Fort Royal as well as keeping a watch off Havana. At the same time British frigates were battling both Spanish and French privateers.

=== East Indies, 1782–1783 ===
Suffren, an aggressive fighter and seeker of decisive action, foiled a British attempt to take the Cape in early 1781, attacking a Royal Navy squadron at Porto Praya in the Cape Verde Islands which are in the Atlantic about 450 miles west of Africa. He arrived in southern India a year later. On land, the French supported Hyder Ali in his war against the British East India Company. At sea, Suffren fought five intense and hard contested battles against the British East Indies Fleet during 1782 and 1783. Vice Admiral Edward Hughes was aware that the French objective was to dislocate British economic exploitation and military domination, and that the preservation of his squadron was crucial for the survival of the British presence in India. The two equally capable and determined fleets broke off their mutual challenge only when news arrived that peace treaties had been signed by Britain, France and Spain in early 1783. When news of the peace had filtered through the tactical situation in India had also ended in stalemate.

=== Peace negotiations ===
Serious negotiations began between Britain, France and Spain (for which Britain's chief negotiator was Alleyne Fitzherbert, and Spain's 10th Count of Aranda). From time to time, news would arrive from India of continuing stalemate, both in the land wars (which involved the French only as supporters to local rulers) and in naval battles; the British still appeared to hold all the French territory there that they had captured in 1778–79, while the French held no British territory. In the West Indies, on the other hand, the French still held all the territory they had captured, while the British held only one French island, St. Lucia. Nevertheless, after the Battle of the Saintes the strategic initiative was passed to the British whose dominance at sea was reasserted and signaled a collapse in the Franco-American alliance. As a result, talks between America and Britain through Shelburne and Franklin began with the British agreeing to recognise the new 'United States'.

France, under its treaty of alliance with Spain, could not make peace without Spain's agreement; not without a guarantee that Gibraltar would be handed over to Spain. Both wanted to speed up their major assault on Gibraltar with the hope of its capture, in order to gain a major diplomatic hand. Gibraltar thus became a main factor in the peace talks. French troops had reinforced the Spanish along with the ships of the French navy. The French commander the Duc de Crillon was now in charge of Franco-Spanish operations.

=== Gibraltar and end of the war ===
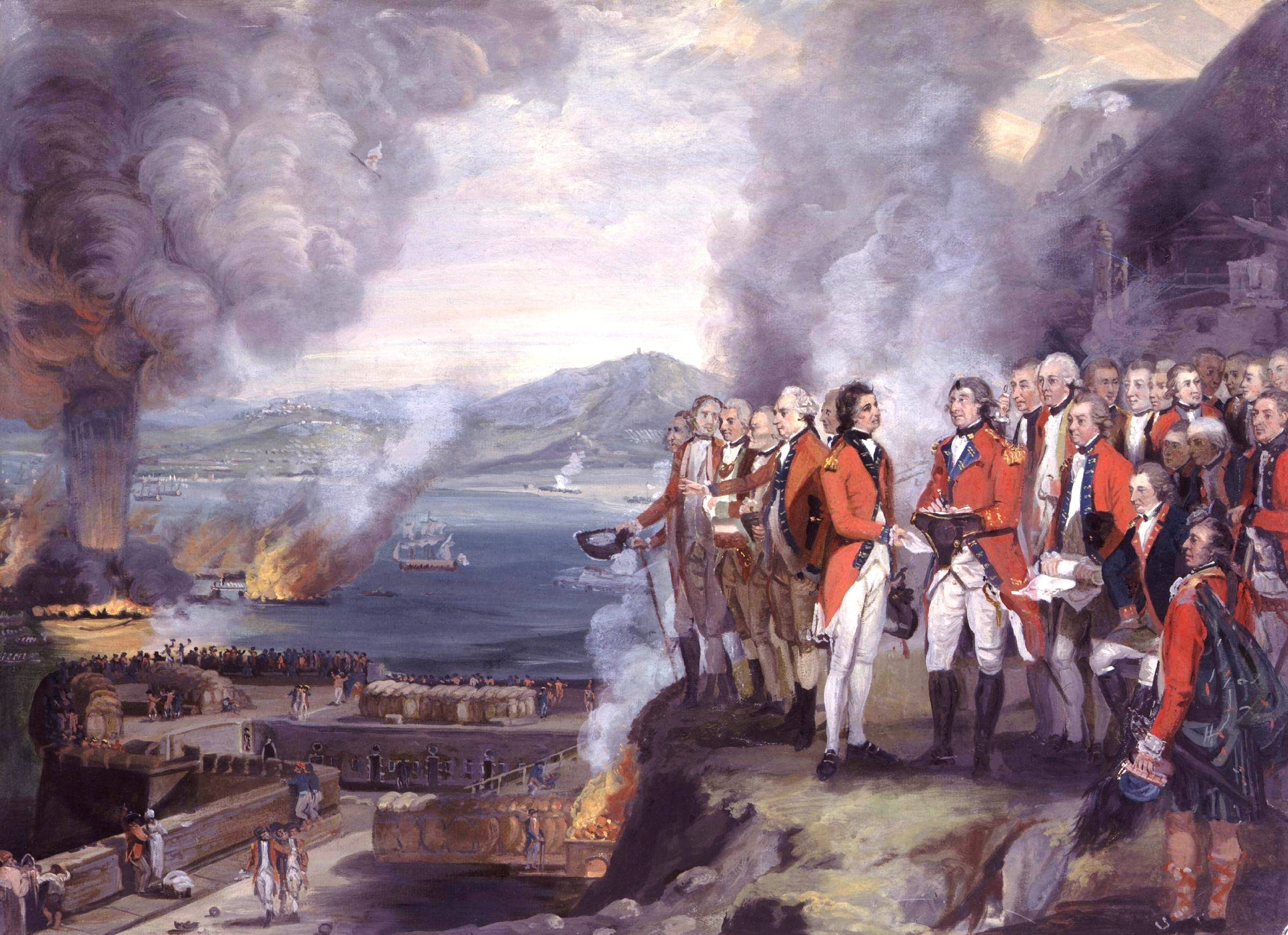
The Siege of Gibraltar, 1782, showing the defeat of the Franco-Spanish assault in September 1782 by George Carter

On 18 September the allies launched their grand assault with ten French designed floating batteries involving more troops than had ever been in service at one time on the entire North American continent. The assault that day and into the following morning however was a huge costly failure with the loss of all ten floating batteries. By 27 September news of the disaster had reached Paris and Madrid and was met with despair by both nations. All hope now lay on the defeat of the British squadron on its way to relieve Gibraltar. The French and Spanish hoped that its defeat or failure would lead to the surrender of the garrison prompting negotiation. The convoy got through without any problems and an attempt to defeat the British fleet ended in failure at the Battle of Cape Spartel. News of this further failure broke French and Spanish resolve. With Gibraltar safe along with Rodney's victory at the Saintes back in April, British demands at the peace talks had now greatly strengthened and had undermined the French confidence that had greeted the success at Yorktown. The British diplomats steadfastly refused to part with Gibraltar, despite offers by Spain to trade most of its gains.

The French had done all they could to help the Spanish achieve their essential war aim, and began serious discussions on alternative exit strategies, the French diplomat Comte de Vergennes attempted to get Spain to offer Britain some very large concessions in return for Gibraltar. The Spanish under the Count of Aranda consented without consulting the court of Madrid.

Vergennes was desperate for peace – for France the cost of the war became a huge issue they had approached the limits of its ability to borrow money. At the forefront of this cost was the French Navy – during the first four years of the war the French navy had lost four ships of the line, three of them to accidents. During 1782 however it would lose fifteen of the line (nearly half of these being in April alone). The losses of these ships were significant financially – undaunted, Louis nevertheless promised to build more ships. New taxes were thus levied – the French finance minister Jean-François Joly de Fleury successfully secured the addition of a Vingtième income tax – the third and last one of its kind in the ancien regime.

Soon after Gibraltar had been relieved Vergennes promptly reopened negotiations. The French accepted the preliminary peace treaty between Great Britain and America on 30 November, with protests but no action. Preliminary treaties were signed with Britain, France and Spain on 20 January 1783. The siege of Gibraltar was lifted three days later, but news of the peace did not reach Indian waters until June.

== Aftermath ==
As a result of the 1783 Anglo-French Treaty of Versailles, France and Britain returned nearly all the territories they had taken from each other since 1778.

For the French the results of the war were mixed; they succeeded in their war aim to separate America from Britain. The gains however were meagre – the tiny island of Tobago, which they had captured in 1781, and also some territory around the Senegal River in Africa which it had lost to Britain in 1763. The whole arrangement for fishing around the Newfoundland coast had to be renegotiated because of the rights awarded to the Americans. France was unable to reverse the humiliation of 1762 – India, Canada and Britain's West Indian colonies, all gains from 1762, remained intact. Aside from some lamentation, Britons were not traumatized by the loss of America. In addition to the fact that cultural and economic ties soon revived between America, Britain had effectively won the last year of the global war. They ended up with good trade links with their former colonists and out traded France within months of the final peace treaty. As the French foreign minister Vergennes later put it, "The English buy peace rather than make it".

For France however the cost of the war would leave a serious mark; over 1.3 billion livres had been spent over the five year conflict. On top of the costs of French ship building after the Seven Years' war, the debt caused major economic and political problems and, as the country struggled to pay its debts, this eventually led to the Financial Crisis of 1786 and ultimately to the French Revolution in 1789.

== Sources ==
- Allison, David K; Ferreiro, Larrie D, eds. (2018). The American Revolution: A World War. Smithsonian Institution. ISBN 9781588346599.
- Ayling, Stanley Edward (1972). George the Third. London: Collins. ISBN 9780002114127.
- Barros, Carolyn A.; Smith, Johanna M. (2000). Life-writings by British Women, 1660–1815: An Anthology. UPNE. ISBN 978-1-55553-432-5.
- Bemis, Samuel Flagg (2012). The Diplomacy of the American Revolution. Read Books Ltd. ISBN 9781447485155.
- Berenger, Jean (1997). A History of the Habsburg Empire 1700–1918. New York: Longman. ISBN 0-582-09007-5.
- Black, Jeremy (2006). George III America's Last King. Yale University Press. ISBN 9780300117325.
- Blanning, Timothy (1996). The French Revolutionary Wars. New York: Oxford University Press. ISBN 0-340-56911-5.
- Boromé, Joseph (January 1969). "Dominica during French Occupation, 1778–1784". The English Historical Review. 884 (330): 36–58. doi:10.1093/ehr/LXXXIV.CCCXXX.36. JSTOR 562321.
- Chartrand, René (2006). Gibraltar 1779–83: The Great Siege. Osprey Publishing. ISBN 978-1-84176-977-6.
- Colomb, Philip (1895). Naval Warfare, its Ruling Principles and Practice Historically Treated. London: W. H. Allen. OCLC 2863262.
- Dull, Jonathan R (2009). The Age of the Ship of the Line: The British & French Navies, 1650–1815. Seaforth Publishing. ISBN 9781473811669.
- Grainger, John D (2005). The Battle of Yorktown, 1781: A Reassessment. Boydell Press. ISBN 978-1-8438-3137-2.
- Greene, Jack P; Pole, J.R, eds. (2008). A Companion to the American Revolution. John Wiley & Sons. ISBN 9780470756447.
- Falkner, James (2009), Fire Over The Rock: The Great Siege of Gibraltar 1779–1783, Pen and Sword, ISBN 9781473814226
- France, Kingdom of; United States of America (1788). "Treaty of Alliance". The Avalon Project, Yale Law School.
- Glascock, Melvin Bruce (1969). "New Spain and the War for America, 1779-1783". LSU Historical Dissertations and Theses. Louisiana State University. doi:10.31390/gradschool_disstheses.1590. S2CID 249662314.
- Hagan, Kenneth J (16 October 2009). "The birth of American naval strategy". In Hagan, Kenneth J.; McMaster, Michael T; Stoker, Donald (eds.). Strategy in the American War of Independence: A Global Approach. Routledge. ISBN 978-1-134-21039-8.
- Jackson, Kenneth T; Dunbar, David S. (2005). Empire City: New York Through the Centuries. Columbia University Press. ISBN 978-0-2311-0909-3.
- Hardman, John (2016). The Life of Louis XVI. Yale University Press. ISBN 9780300220421.
- Harvey, Robert (2004). A Few Bloody Noses: The American Revolutionary War. Robinson. ISBN 9781841199528.
- Ketchum, Richard M (1997). Saratoga: Turning Point of America's Revolutionary War. New York: Henry Holt. ISBN 9780805061239. OCLC 41397623. (Paperback ISBN 0-8050-6123-1)
- Lavery, Brian (2009). Empire of the seas: how the navy forged the modern world. Conway. ISBN 9781844861095.
- Kochin, Michael S; Taylor, Michael (2020). An Independent Empire: Diplomacy & War in the Making of the United States. University of Michigan Press. ISBN 9780472054404.
- Mahan, Alfred T (1957). The Influence of Sea Power Upon History, 1660–1783. New York: Hill and Wang.
- Mahan, Alfred T (1898). Major Operations of the Royal Navy, 1762–1783: Being Chapter XXXI in The Royal Navy. A History. Boston: Little, Brown. ISBN 978-1-02-226825-8. OCLC 46778589.
- Marley, David F (1998). Wars of the Americas: A Chronology of Armed Conflict in the New World, 1492 to the Present. Santa Barbara, CA: ABC-CLIO. ISBN 9781598841008. OCLC 166373121.
- Mirza, Rocky M (2007). The Rise and Fall of the American Empire: A Re-Interpretation of History, Economics and Philosophy: 1492–2006. Trafford Publishing. ISBN 978-1-4251-1383-4.
- Morris, Richard B (1983) [1965]. The Peacemakers: The Great Powers and American Independence.
- Morris, Richard Brandon, ed. (1975). John Jay: The winning of the peace: unpublished papers, 1780-1784 Volume 2. Harper & Row. ISBN 9780060130480.
- O'Shaughnessy, Andrew (2013). The Men Who Lost America: British Command during the Revolutionary War and the Preservation of the Empire. Oneworld Publications. ISBN 9781780742465.
- Page, Anthony (2014). Britain and the Seventy Years War, 1744-1815: Enlightenment, Revolution and Empire. Macmillan International Higher Education. ISBN 9781137474438.
- Pratt, Julius William (1971). A History of United States Foreign Policy. Prentice-Hall. ISBN 9780133923162.
- Reeve, John (16 October 2009). "British naval strategy: war on a global scale". In Hagan, Kenneth J; McMaster, Michael T; Stoker, Donald (eds.). Strategy in the American War of Independence: A Global Approach. Routledge. ISBN 978-1-134-21039-8.
- Renaut, Francis P. (1922). Le Pacte de famille et l'Amérique: La politique coloniale franco-espagnole de 1760 à 1792. Paris.
- Richmond, Herbert W. (1931). The Navy in India 1763–1783. London: Ernest Benn.
- Rodger, Nicholas A.M. (2005). The Command of the Ocean: A Naval History of Britain, 1649–1815. New York: W.W. Norton.
- Rogoziński, Jan (1999). A Brief History of the Caribbean: From the Arawak and the Carib to the Present. Facts On File. ISBN 9780816038114.
- Schiff, Stacy (2005). A Great Improvisation: Franklin, France, and the Birth of America. Thorndike Press. ISBN 978-0-7862-7832-9.
- Scott, Hamish M. (1990). British Foreign Policy in the Age of the American Revolution. Clarendon Press. ISBN 978-0-19-820195-3.
- Simms, Brendan (2009). Three Victories and a Defeat: The Rise and Fall of the First British Empire, 1714-1783. Penguin Books Limited. ISBN 978-0-1402-8984-8.
- Stockley, Andrew (1 January 2001). Britain and France at the Birth of America: The European Powers and the Peace Negotiations of 1782–1783. University of Exeter Press. ISBN 978-0-85989-615-3.
- Stone, Bailey (2014). The Anatomy of Revolution Revisited: A Comparative Analysis of England, France, and Russia. Cambridge University Press. ISBN 9781107045729.
- Syrett, David (30 June 2007). The Rodney papers: selections from the correspondence of Admiral Lord Rodney. Ashgate. ISBN 978-0-7546-6007-1.
- Syrett, David (1998). The Royal Navy in European Waters During the American Revolutionary War. Univ of South Carolina Press. ISBN 978-1-57003-238-7.
- Regan, Geoffrey (2012). Great Naval Blunders. Andre Deutsch. ISBN 978-0233003504.
- Tombs, Isabelle; Tombs, Robert (2010). That Sweet Enemy: The British and the French from the Sun King to the Present. Random House. ISBN 9781446426234.
- Trew, Peter (2006). Rodney and the Breaking of the Line. Pen & Sword Military. ISBN 9781844151431.
- Tuchman, Barbara (1988). The First Salute: A View of the American Revolution. New York: Knopf. ISBN 0-394-55333-0.
