= Carénage =

- Quartier
- The quartier of Carénage marked 20.
- Coordinates: 17°53′48″N 62°49′40″W
- Country: France
- Overseas collectivity: Saint Barthélemy

Carénage (French pronunciation: [kaʁenaʒ]) is a quartier of Saint Barthélemy in the Caribbean. It is located in the western-central part of the island and is one of the smallest quartiers on the island.
