= Fort Cachacrou =

Significant site in Dominica

- Scott's Head, Dominica
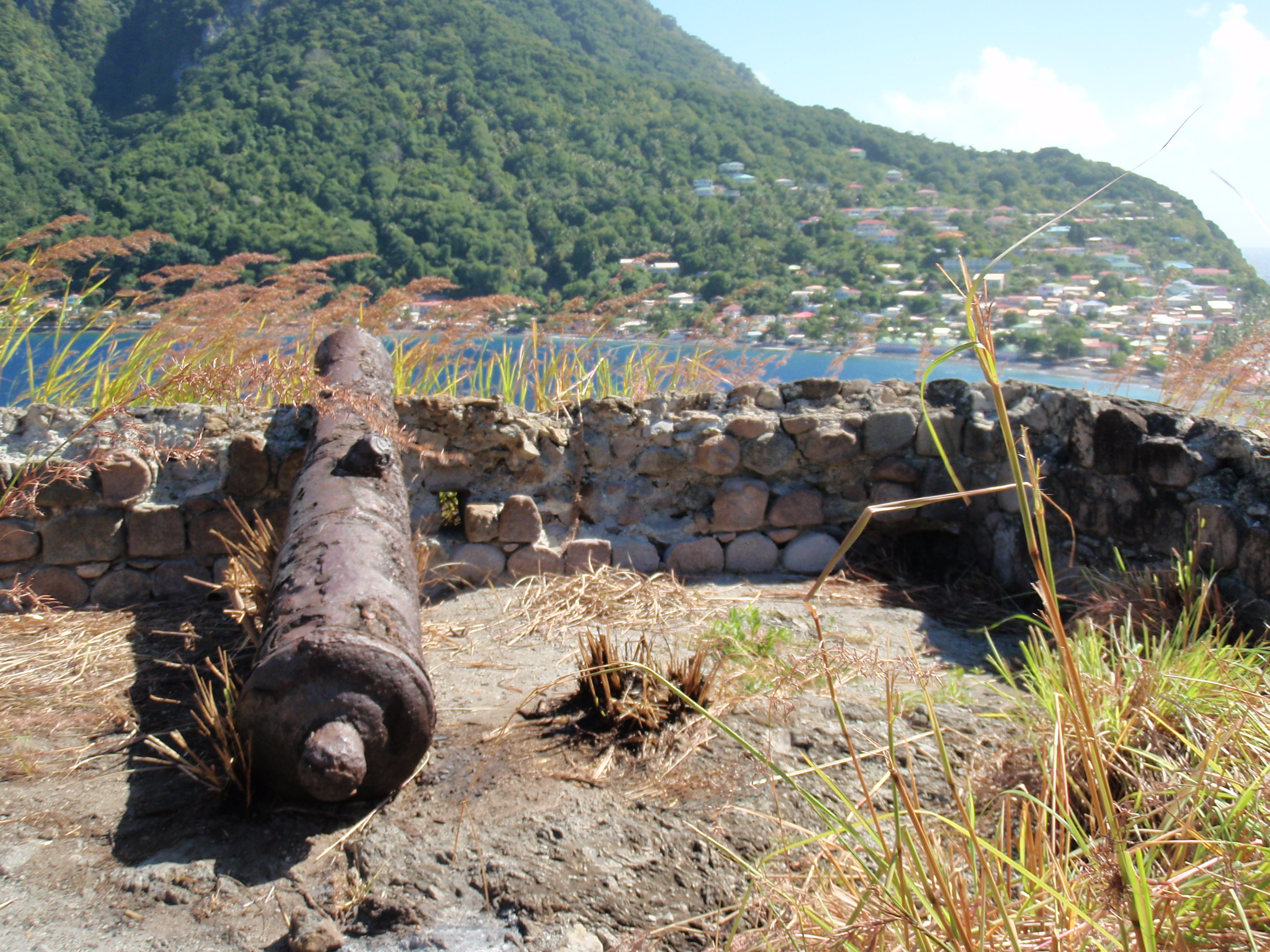
- Fort Cachacrou ruins, overlooking Soufriere Bay

Site information
- Type: Fortification
- Condition: Ruins

Location
- Location in Caribbean Fort Cachacrou (the Caribbean)
- Coordinates: 15.215801°N 61.36798°W

Site history
- In use: No
- Materials: Stone
- Battles/wars: 1778 Invasion of Dominica (American Revolutionary War)

Fort Cachacrou (also Fort Cashacrou or Fort Cacharou) was a historic military fortification and signal station on the island of Dominica. The fort was built by the British in the 1760s in present-day Scotts Head. During the American Revolutionary War, it was the site of the first battle in the French Invasion of Dominica. Remains of Fort Cachacrou include portions of the original walls and a canon. The site is accessible via the Waitukubuli National Trail.

== Etymology ==
The Fort's name comes from the Carib name for the peninsula it was built on: Cachacrou, meaning "that which is being eaten by the sea". Alternate spellings of the word include Cashacrou, Kachakou, Casharou, or Cacharou.

The Carib name is possibly a reference to the peninsula's location at the convergence of the Caribbean Sea to its north and the Atlantic Ocean to its south. (The peninsula is considered a tied island, due to its being connected to the mainland by a tombolo.)

The peninsula was later renamed Scotts Head, after Captain George Scott, lieutenant governor of Dominica from 1764 to 1767.

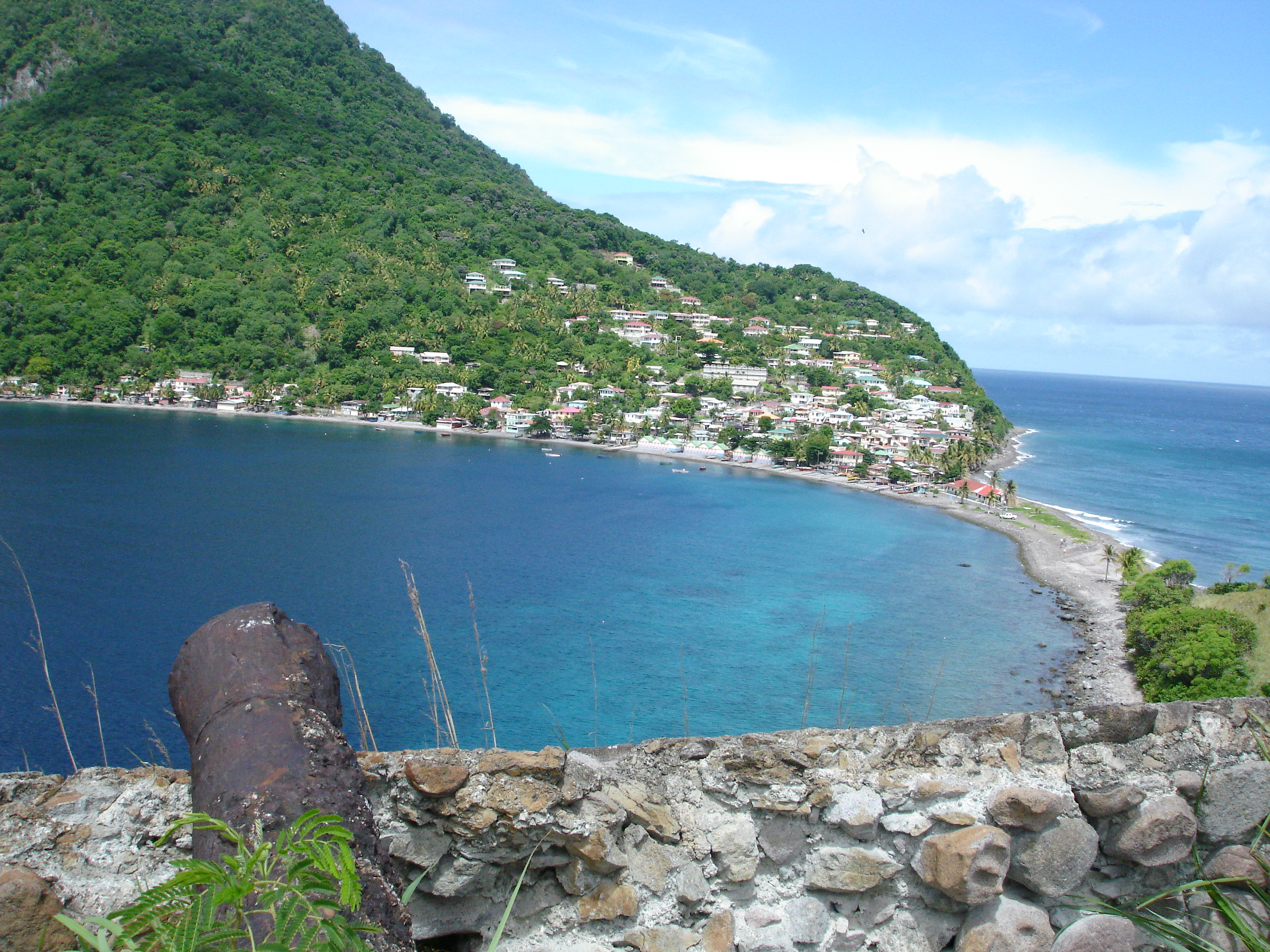
View of tombolo connecting mainland to Scotts Head (Cachacrou) peninsula

== History ==
=== Fort origins ===
In the 1760s, George Scott oversaw the construction of Fort Cachacrou. The fort was built on the southwestern tip of the island, on the Scotts Head peninsula, about three hundred feet above sea level. The fort was the island's primary point of defense for attacks that came from the south. It overlooked Soufriere Bay to the north, and open seas to the west and south. The island of Martinique, 20 miles (32 km) to the south, was visible from the fort.

Fort Cachacrou was part of a line of signal stations organized by Captain Bruce, Royal Engineer, to get messages up and down the western coast. Using combinations of gun salutes and flag signals, a message could get from Fort Cachacrou to the garrison at Cabrits in less than half an hour.

=== French invasion (1778) ===
In September 1778, the French launched an invasion of Dominica, and Fort Cachacrou was their first point of attack. In anticipation of the invasion, French inhabitants of Dominica visited British troops at the fort on 6 September, getting them intoxicated and spiking the cannons with sand. French fleets sailed between three and four o'clock on 7 September from Martinique, the French-controlled island directly to Dominica's south. When the French stormed the fort in the morning, the British were taken by surprise. Once the fort was captured, the French fired a celebration signal, which was the first notice of the invasion the British had in the capital of Roseau to the north. The French successfully captured the island, and held it for more than five years until the end of the American Revolutionary War. In January 1784, the island was returned to British rule per the terms of the Treaty of Paris.

=== French attack (1805) ===
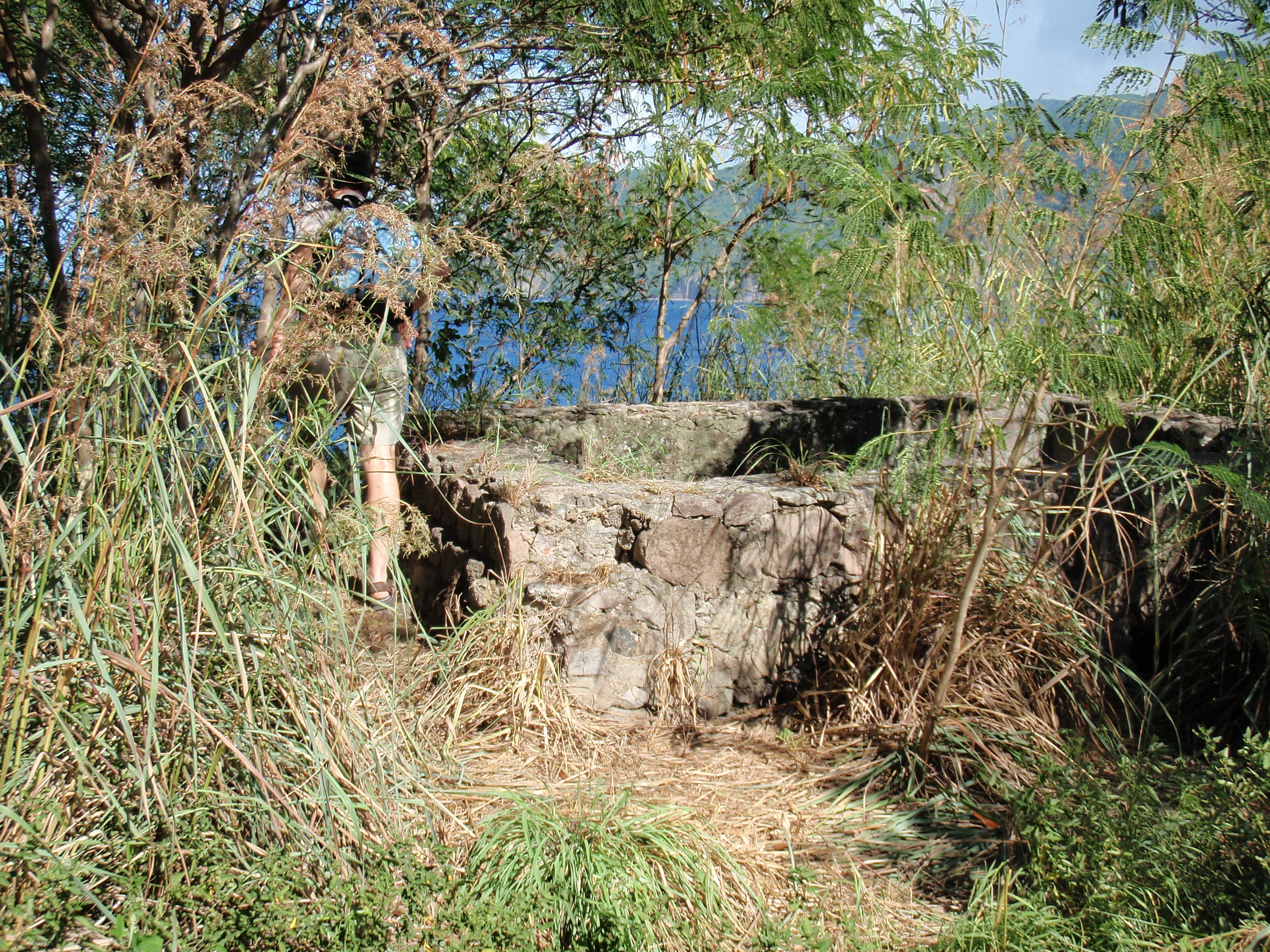
Fort Cachacrou ruins (Scotts Head, Dominica)

In 1805, the French attempted to invade Dominica again, but were beaten back by the soldiers, including those of the 46th regiment. Officer James Wallis received an official commendation for his conduct during the conflict while in charge of the outpost at Fort Cachacrou.
