= Treaty of Alliance (1778) =

Military alliance between the revolutionary United States and France

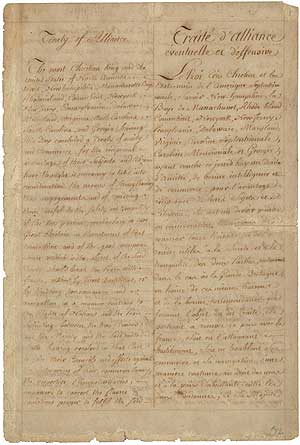
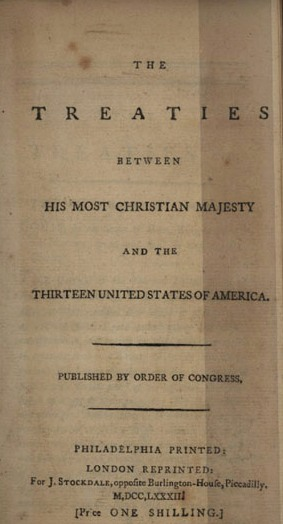
Left: Original Franco-American treaty, signed February 6, 1778
Right: Text of the 1778 Franco-American treaty, in a 1782 publication.

The Treaty of Alliance (French: traité d'alliance (1778)), also known as the Franco-American Treaty, was a defensive alliance treaty between the Kingdom of France and the United States formed amid the American Revolutionary War with Great Britain. It was signed by delegates of King Louis XVI and the Second Continental Congress in Paris on February 6, 1778, along with the Treaty of Amity and Commerce and a secret clause providing for the entry of other European allies; together these instruments are sometimes known as the Franco-American Alliance or the Treaties of Alliance. The agreements marked the official entry of the United States on the world stage, and formalized French recognition and support of U.S. independence that was to be decisive in U.S. victory.

The Treaty of Alliance was signed immediately after the Treaty of Amity and Commerce, in which France was the first nation to formally recognize the U.S. as a sovereign nation; (Note: Morocco was the first country to de facto recognize American independence through a 1777 decree by Sultan Mohammad III to provide safe harbor to U.S. commercial vessels. However, relations were not formalized by treaty until 1786.) this treaty had also established mutual commercial and navigation rights between the two nations, in direct defiance of the British Navigation Acts, which restricted American access to foreign markets. In contemplation that these commercial and diplomatic ties would result in hostilities between France and Britain, the Treaty of Alliance guaranteed French military support in just such an event. It also forbade either nation from making a separate peace with Britain, and was contemplated as a permanent defensive pact.

The successful negotiation of the Treaty of Alliance and its sister agreements is considered the "single most important diplomatic success of the colonists", since it helped secure vital aid in the war with Britain; the treaties were immediately followed by substantial material, military, and financial support to the American cause. Some historians consider the signing of the Treaty of Alliance as marking America's de jure recognition as an independent nation. Notwithstanding its significance, subsequent complications with the Treaty of Alliance led to its annulment by the turn of the 19th century, with the United States eschewing formal military alliances until the Second World War.

== Background ==
When the thirteen British colonies in America declared their independence from Great Britain in 1776, their most obvious potential ally was France, a long-time enemy of Britain and a colonial rival who had lost much of their lands in the Americas after the French and Indian War. France's leadership had been alarmed by Britain's victory in the Seven Years' War which had shifted the European balance of power and had been planning for a war of revenge since the Treaty of Paris that had ended the conflict in 1763. The French foreign minister Choiseul had envisaged this taking place in alliance with Spain and involving a Franco-Spanish invasion of Britain. Choiseul had been ready go to war in 1770 during the Falklands Crisis, but Louis XV had been alarmed by the British naval mobilization and instead dismissed Choiseul and backed down.

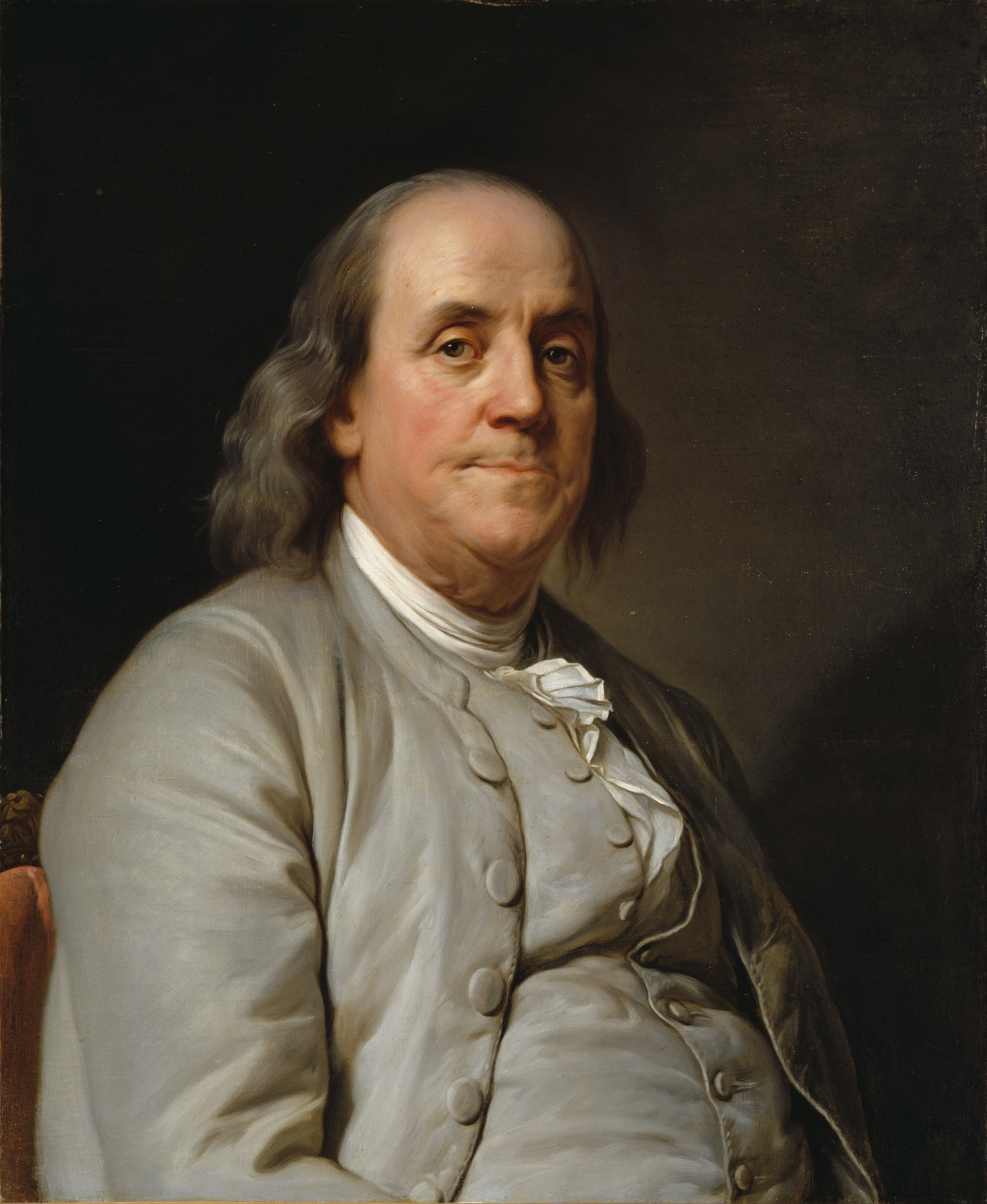
Benjamin Franklin's celebrity-like status in France helped win French support for the United States during the American Revolutionary War.

As a result, Jefferson began drafting conditions for a possible commercial treaty between France and the future independent colonies of the United States, which declined the presence of French troops and any aspect of French authority in colonial affairs. On September 25 the Continental Congress ordered commissioners, led by Benjamin Franklin, to seek a treaty with France based upon Adams draft treaty that had later been formalized into a Model Treaty which sought the establishment of reciprocal trade relations with France but declined to mention any possible military assistance from the French government. Despite orders to seek no direct military assistance from France, the American commissioners were instructed to work to acquire most favored nation trading relations with France, along with additional military aid, and were encouraged to reassure any Spanish delegates that the United States had no desire to acquire Spanish lands in the Americas, in hopes that Spain would in turn enter a possible Franco-American alliance.

Despite an original openness to the alliance, after word of the Declaration of Independence and a British evacuation of Boston reached France, the French Foreign Minister, Comte de Vergennes, put off signing a formal alliance with the United States after receiving news of British victories over General George Washington in the New York and New Jersey campaign. With the help of the Committee of Secret Correspondence, established by the U.S. Continental Congress to promote the American cause in France, and his standing as a model of republican simplicity within French society, Benjamin Franklin was able to gain a secret loan and clandestine military assistance from the Foreign Minister but was forced to put off negotiations on a formal alliance while the French government negotiated a possible alliance with Spain.

With the defeat of Britain at the Battle of Saratoga and growing rumors of secret British peace offers to Franklin, France sought to seize an opportunity to take advantage of the rebellion and abandoned negotiations with the Dutch Republic to begin discussions with the United States on a formal alliance. With official approval to begin negotiations on a formal alliance given by King Louis XVI, the colonies turned down a British proposal for reconciliation in January 1778 and began negotiations that would result in the signing of the Treaty of Amity and Commerce and The Treaty of Alliance.

== Terms and provisions ==
The Treaty of Alliance was in effect an insurance policy for France, which guaranteed the support of the United States if Britain broke the peace that it had with the French "either by direct hostilities, or by (hindering) her commerce and navigation," as a result of the signing of the Treaty of Amity and Commerce. The treaty noted the terms and conditions of the military alliance, established requirements for the signing of future peace treaties to end hostilities with the British, and provided for other nations, namely Spain, to join as allies.

=== Articles 1–4: Terms of the alliance ===
The first articles of the treaty establish a general alliance between the two nations. Articles 1-3 stipulate that in the case that war broke out between France and Britain during the continuing hostilities of the American Revolutionary War, a military alliance would be formed between France and the United States, which would combine each respective military force and efforts for the direct purpose of maintaining the "liberty, Sovereignty, and independence absolute and unlimited of the said united States, as well in Matters of Government as of commerce." Article 4 further stipulates that the alliance would continue for "any particular enterprise" indefinitely into the future.

=== Articles 5–9: Terms and conditions of peace treaties with England ===
This portion of the treaty pre-emptively divides any lands obtained from Great Britain by successful military campaigns or concessions made by Britain in peace treaties to end hostilities with the signing nations. The United States was effectively guaranteed control of any land that it could gain possession of in North America, besides the islands of Saint Pierre and Miquelon, which France had retained possession of after the Seven Years' War, and Bermuda since King Louis XVI of France renounced "for ever the possession of the Islands of Bermudas as well as of any part of the continent of North America which before the treaty of Paris in 1763, or in virtue of that Treaty, were acknowledged to belong to the Crown of Great Britain, or to the United States heretofore called British Colonies, or which are at this Time or have lately been under the Power of The King and Crown of Great Britain." In return, the King was guaranteed "any of the Islands situated in the Gulph of Mexico, or near that Gulph" of which France could gain possession. Additional clauses insured that neither France nor the United States would seek to make any additional claims of compensation for their services during the conflict and that neither side would cease fighting or sign a peace treaty with Britain without the consent of the other nation and insurances that the independence of the United States would be recognized by Britain.

=== Article 10: Open invitation to other nations ===
Article 10 of the treaty, although largely directed to Spain, invited any other nations "who may have received injuries from England" to negotiate terms and conditions for joining the alliance.

=== Article 11: Pledge to honor land claims ===
Article 11 pledged to honor the lands claims of both nations forever into the future, with the United States guaranteeing full support of France's current land claims and any lands it acquired during the war against all other nations and France, in turn, pledged support for the American land claims and guaranteed to help preserve the country's "liberty, Sovereignty, and Independence absolute, and unlimited, as well in Matters of Government as commerce."

=== Article 12–13: Effective dates of the treaty, ratification, and signing delegates ===
Article 12 establishes the agreement as a conditional treaty that would take effect only upon a declaration of war between France and Britain, and it made the land, and diplomatic guarantees laid out in the treaty dependent upon the completion of the American Revolutionary War and a peace treaty that formally establishes each nation's land possessions.

== Signing and aftermath ==
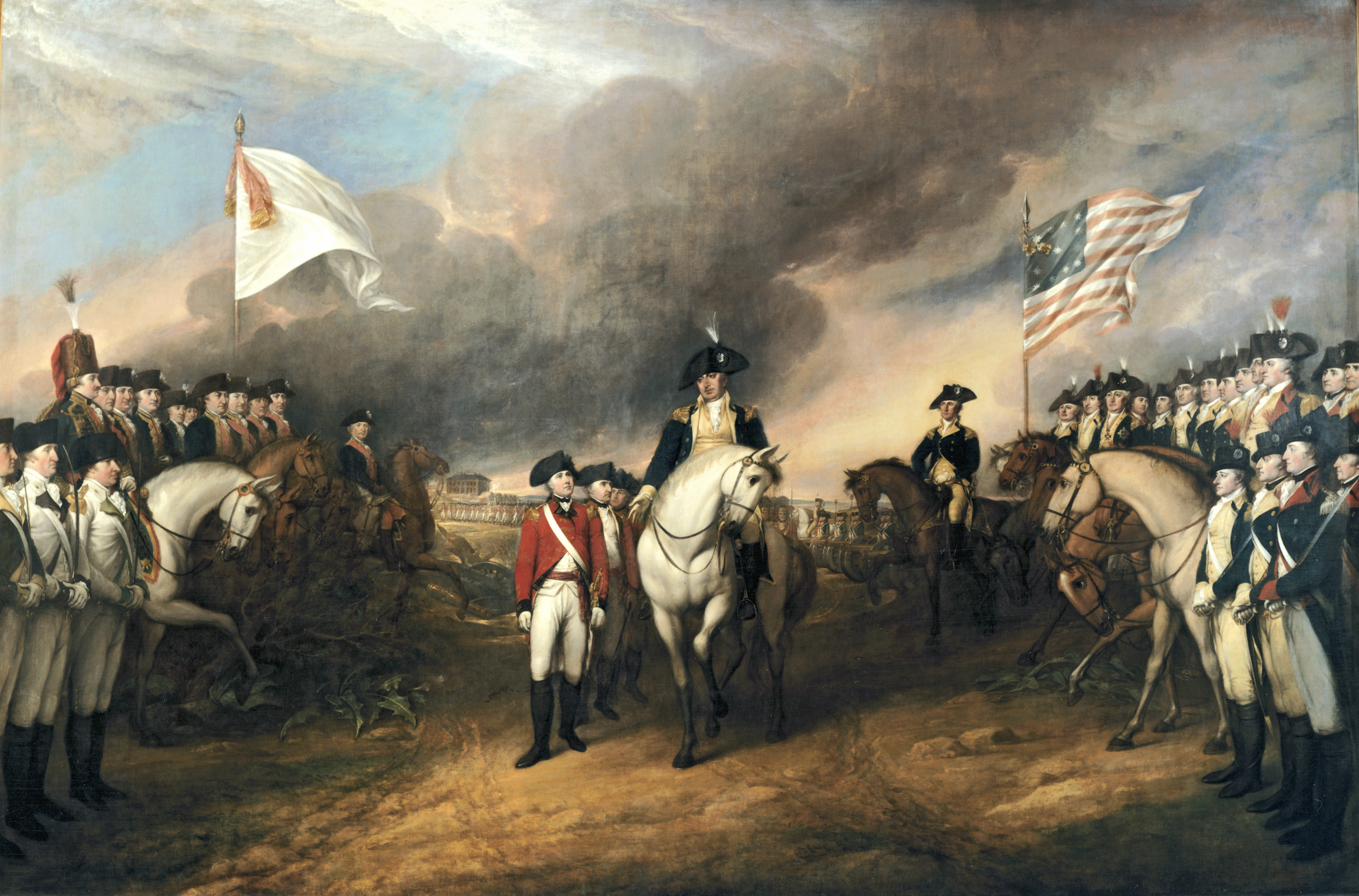
Surrender of Lord Cornwallis by John Trumbull, 1820

On February 6, 1778, Benjamin Franklin and the two other commissioners, Arthur Lee and Silas Deane, signed the treaty on behalf of the United States, and Conrad Alexandre Gérard signed on behalf of France. On March 13, 1778, France informed Britain of its signing of the treaties and subsequent recognition of the United States as an independent nation; four days later, Britain declared war on France, thereby bringing the French into the American Revolutionary War. Their entry led to a significant escalation, as what would otherwise have been a "lopsided colonial rebellion" became a much larger and more complex geopolitical conflict with one of the world's premier superpowers.

As contemplated by the Treaty of Alliance, Spain allied with France against Britain through the Treaty of Aranjuez on April 12, 1779. The Franco-Spanish siege on Gibraltar, though ultimately unsuccessful, served to sap British manpower and war material from North America. The Dutch Republic joined the conflict the following year, when Britain declared war after discovering Dutch support for the American rebels. Although the Dutch did not formally ally with the United States, their role as co-belligerents with France further occupied British forces, particularly in the Caribbean and the Indian Ocean. The Dutch Republic also became the second nation to officially recognize U.S. independence, in 1782, and concluded its own commercial and navigation treaty with America.

After the signing of the treaty, an influx of French arms, ammunition, and uniforms proved vital for the Continental Army, while their military actions in the West Indies and elsewhere forced Britain to redeploy troops and naval units away from the North American colonies to secure their holdings. French involvement in the war would prove to be exceedingly important during the Siege of Yorktown, when 10,800 French regulars and 29 French warships, under the command of the Comte de Rochambeau and Comte de Grasse respectively, joined forces with General George Washington and the Marquis de Lafayette to obtain the surrender of Lord Cornwallis's Southern army, and effectively bringing an end to the fighting on the North American mainland for the remainder of the war. All the belligerents of the conflict concluded hostilities by signing the 1783 Treaty of Paris.

=== Deteriorating relations ===
Almost immediately after the signing of the 1783 Treaty of Paris, Americans began to question whether the lack of an end date for the military alliance had essentially created a perpetual alliance between the United States and France. Those Americans who disliked the proposition of being eternally tied to France—most notably the Secretary of the Treasury Alexander Hamilton and his supporters in the Federalist Party—seized on the French Revolution as a chance to officially nullify the treaty. Despite a consensus of European monarchs who considered the treaty nullified by the execution of Louis XVI during the French Revolution, President George Washington sided with his Secretary of State Thomas Jefferson and declared that the treaty was still in effect, notwithstanding the regime change in France.

Although the Washington Administration had declared that the treaty remained valid, President Washington's formal Proclamation of Neutrality, and the subsequent Neutrality Act of 1794, effectively invalidated the military provisions of the treaty and touched off a period of increasingly deteriorated relations between the two nations. The efforts of the new French Minister Edmond-Charles Genêt to raise militias and privateers to attack Spanish colonies and British ships, during the Citizen Genet Affair and despite Washington's pledge of neutrality, turned public opinion against the French and led to the resignation of Thomas Jefferson, a longtime supporter of the French cause, as Secretary of State. In turn, the signing of Treaty of London of 1794, or Jay's Treaty, convinced many in France that the Americans were treacherous, having surrendered to British demands and abandoned their French allies, despite the assistance they had provided the United States in their own fight for independence during the American Revolutionary War.

The alliance was further attacked in President Washington's Farewell Address, in which he declared that the United States was not obligated to honor the military provisions of the treaty, and furthermore warned Americans of the dangers of the same kind of permanent alliances that the United States was currently engaged in with France, as a result of the Treaty of Alliance. The growing public sentiment against the treaty peaked during the presidency of John Adams, when revolutionary France refused to receive American envoys, and normalize relations, during the XYZ Affair; this resulted in the treaty being annulled by Congress on July 7, 1798. French seizures of American naval vessels during the French Revolutionary Wars led to the Quasi-War and further tensions between the erstwhile allies; the Treaty of Mortefontaine of 1800, which brought an end to the conflict, also formally abrogated the Treaty of Alliance.
