= Eden Agreement =

1786 treaty between Great Britain and France

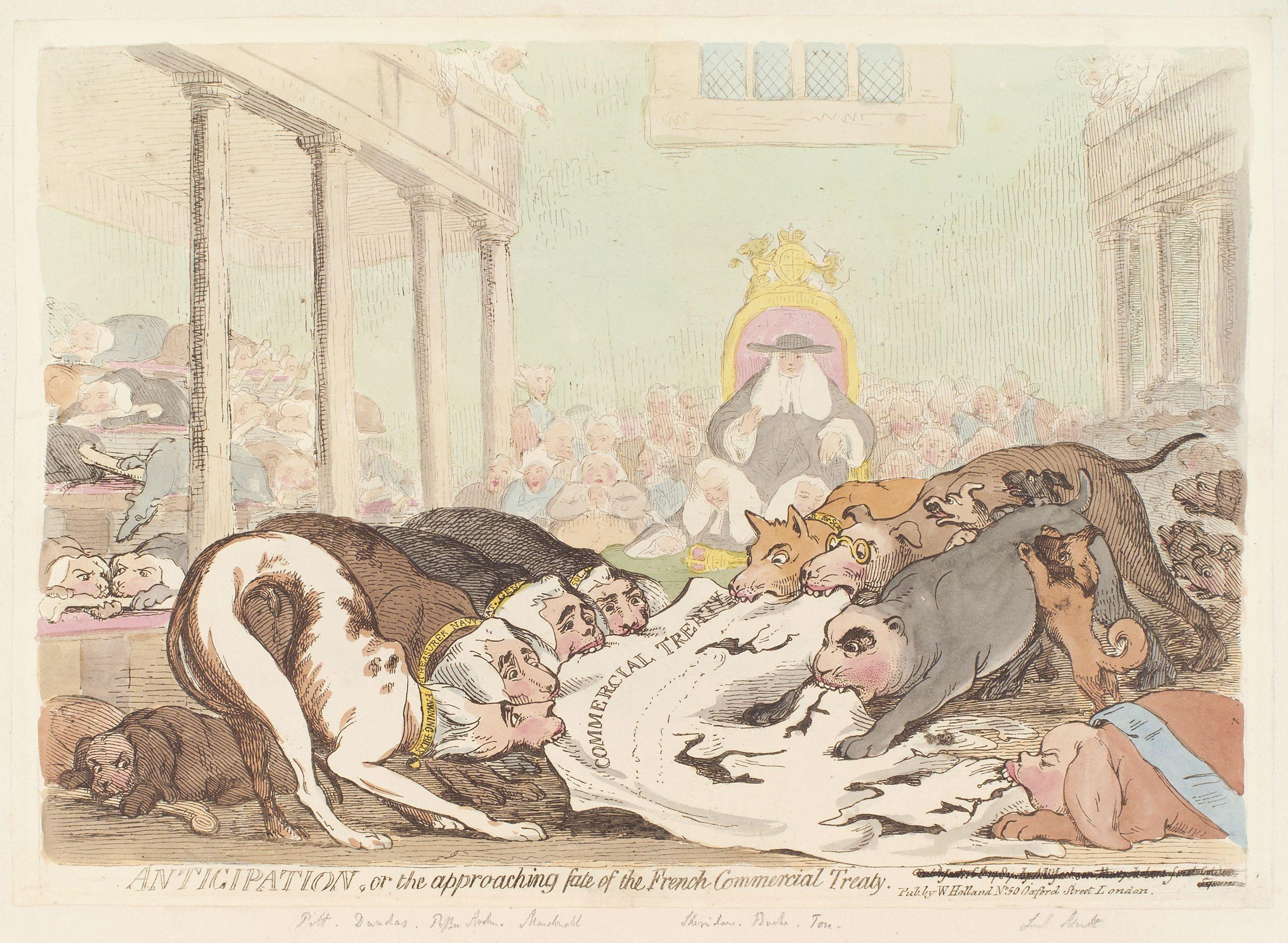
A caricature by James Gillray anticipating conflict among Parliament over the Eden Treaty, here called the French Commercial Treaty.

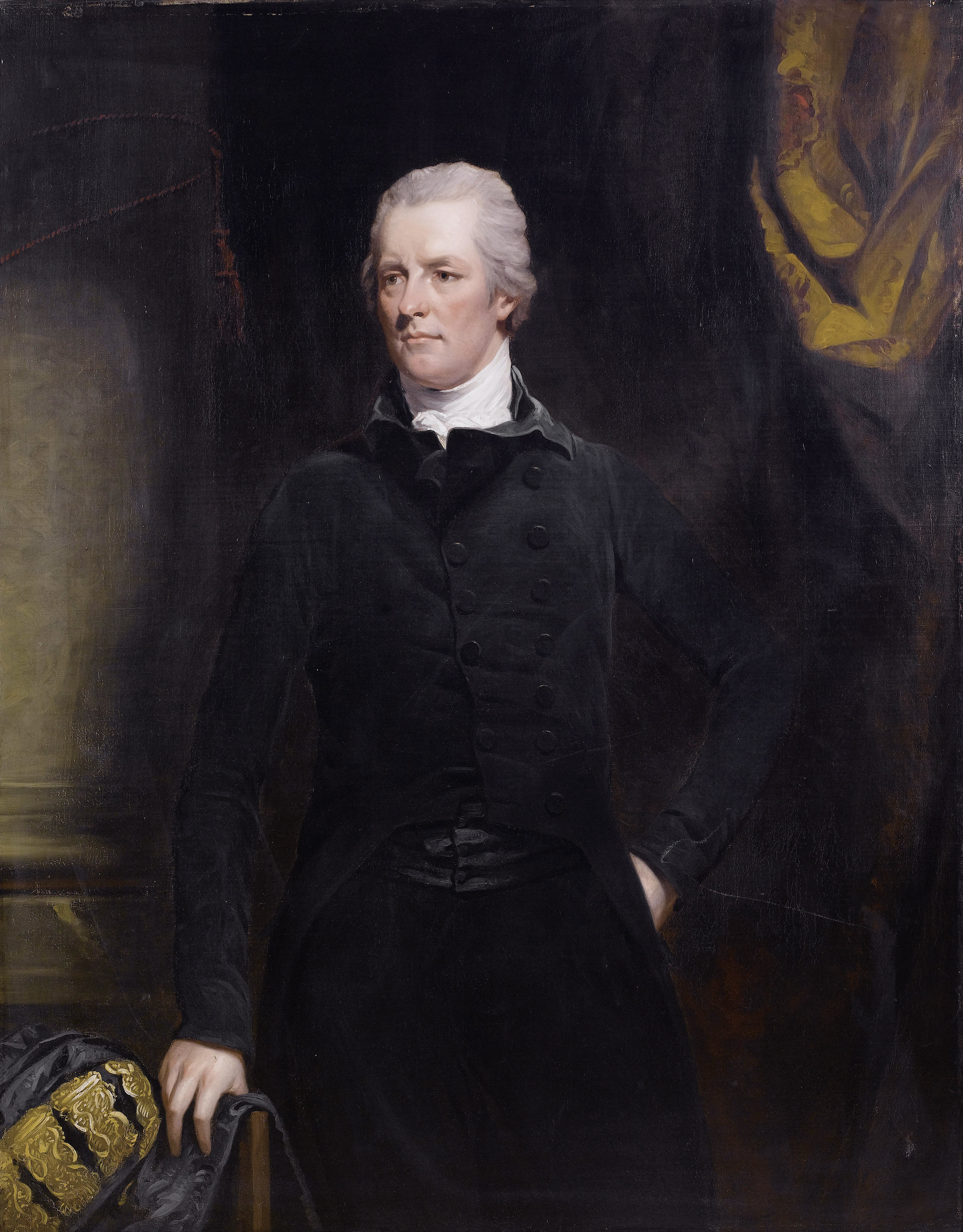
William Pitt the Younger (1759-1806) was essential to the consummation of the Eden Treaty.

The Eden Treaty was a treaty signed between Great Britain and France in 1786, named after the British negotiator William Eden, 1st Baron Auckland (1744–1814). The French side was represented by Joseph Matthias Gérard de Rayneval. It effectively ended, for a brief time, the economic war between France and Great Britain and set up a system to reduce tariffs on goods from either country. It was spurred on in Britain by the secession of the thirteen American colonies, and the publication of Adam Smith's Wealth of Nations. British Prime Minister William Pitt the Younger was heavily influenced by the ideas of Smith, and was one of the key motivators of the treaty.

Obstinancy in negotiations on the part of the British delegation made the commercial agreement almost wholly beneficial to Britain, and the unequal protection on certain industries ended up weakening the French economy. This treaty is often considered to be one of the grievances of the French people that sparked the French Revolution. The treaty collapsed in 1793, following claims in the National Convention that the Aliens Act 1793 breached the terms of the treaty and the outbreak of war in early February between Great Britain and France ended any chance of a compromise.

== Historical background ==
=== Mercantilism ===
The series of events leading up to the Eden Agreement of 1786 began two centuries earlier when mercantilism (a term later coined by Adam Smith) became the leading economic policy in Western Europe. Above all other nations, the two leading mercantilist countries in early modern Europe were Britain and France, who followed the guidance of Jean-Baptiste Colbert. Colbert enforced the policy in 17th-century France based on his understanding that "natural resources are limited, and the power of the nation depends on what portion of the world’s resources it acquires." As a result, mercantilist policies went hand-in-hand with colonialism; colonies provided the mother country with access to resources and raw materials, and, in return, would act as a market for industrial products made in the mother country. Both Britain and France would enact a mercantilist commercial policy that aimed at negating foreign imports (at least through legitimate channels) "so as to give native manufacturers and farmers a virtual monopoly of the home market." Already known as traditional rivals, these stringent mercantilist policies (specifically the high tariffs, and the race to colonize North America and South Asia) created tense diplomatic relationships between England and France.

=== Treaties prior to 1786 ===
The policies of mercantilism in Europe were eased slightly by a series of agreements between several nations leading up to the Eden Treaty of 1786. Besides the House of Bourbon renewing their Family Compact in 1761, the French also opened a few colonial ports to foreign trade in the same year. Twelve years later the French government negotiated the Franco-Portuguese Agreement of 1773. In 1778 France signed the Treaty of Amity and Commerce with the fledgling United States, on a reciprocal trading basis, which broke Britain's mercantile Navigation Acts; they also signed the Franco-American Alliance for mutual defense to protect it, if war erupted as a result, which it did.

Additionally, in the years leading up to 1786, vocal economic leaders like Adam Smith and the Physiocrats promoted a more liberal trade policy in 18th century Britain. Their publications and discussions garnered popularity and created a culture within the country that called for relaxed trade barriers. Although the influence of the people probably had little to no effect on policy-makers, the British government, similarly to its French counterpart, was highly concerned with the lack of national revenue being produced. Both countries urgently sought a remedy; and, out of their urgency, the Eden Agreement of 1786 was agreed upon, effectively softening the stringent mercantile policies of France and Britain.

=== Forces leading to the agreement ===
In the quarter-century leading up to 1786 France had lost most of its Canadian and Indian colonies, national debt had risen to excessively high levels, and many feared national bankruptcy was imminent. The government of Louis XVI believed that if prohibitions were abolished and import duties were reduced, then legitimate trade would expand. If French import duties were reduced as the result of a commercial treaty with Britain, a twofold advantage might be secured: more revenue from import duties, and greater opportunities for manufacturers and wine-merchants to sell their products to Britain. Similarly, the British economy was highly inefficient. With a national debt of £250 million, an extreme black market (only 42% of the tea and 14% of the brandy imported paid the government-issued 119% duties imposed), and the loss of the Thirteen Colonies, William Pitt and the British government were eager to find common ground with their historic rivals in order to secure these "greater opportunities."

The first discussions took place at the Anglo-French peace conference in January, 1783. Article 18 of these talks stipulated that each country would delegate a commission 'to discuss new commercial arrangements of reciprocity.' Hopeful that the commercial agreement would be the first step towards the process of reconciliation, the French lowered their tariffs in 1784 to levels that were laid out in Articles 8 and 9 of the Utrecht Treaty. Consequently, British exports to France rose drastically, or were at least being traded through legitimate channels as opposed to being smuggled through the black market. In Britain, however, there was no reciprocal reaction to the French liberal policy. At the end of 1784, after the British had refused to meet the new standard of the French, France had no choice but to reinstall their prohibitory pre-1784 tariffs. It was these failures that led William Pitt to appoint William Eden as the lead negotiator of commercial talks with the French in the end of 1785.

== The Eden Agreement ==
=== William Eden ===
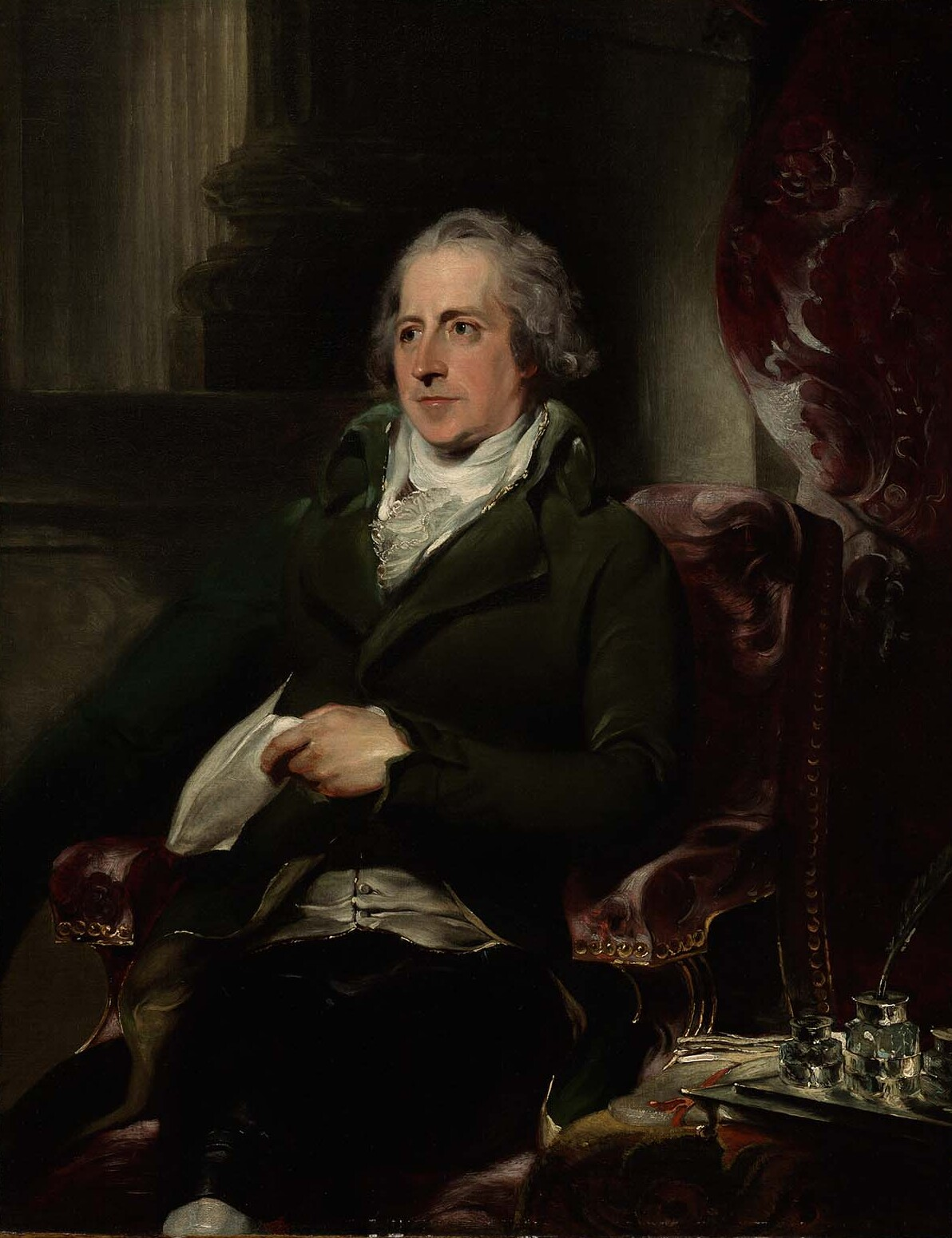
William Eden was the lead negotiator for the British during the deliberations. The agreement is named after him.

Pitt selected William Eden because of his work on the board of Trade and Plantations, and because Eden had vast experience dealing with economic grievances in both Ireland and America, which Pitt believed would furnish Eden with exceptional insight into the Anglo-Franco deliberations. Eden went to work immediately, hammering out an agreement with Gérard de Rayneval, his French counterpart, in April 1786. But, in spite of Eden’s optimism, the British, and more specifically Pitt, did not favour Eden and Rayneval’s original agreement because of its vagueness. Pitt sought to enforce higher duties on what he deemed as the most important goods entering the Anglo-Franco trade market.

=== The Terms of the Treaty ===
During the talks, Rayneval demanded three concessions to be made by the British: that the British admit French silks into their markets; that the British reduce English duties on French wine and spirits; and, that the British abolish their preference of Portuguese wines to French. Although the French were not afforded all of their demands, they did receive the following concessions when the treaty was agreed upon on 26 September 1786:

Ad Valorem Fixed Duties
BEER 30%
LEATHER GOODS 15%
GLASS, COTTONS, WOOLENS 12%
HARDWARE, CUTLERY, GAUGES 10%

Specific Fixed Duties
BRANDY 7^{s} per gallon
CAMBRICS 5^{s} per demi-pièce of 7 3/4 yards

Including the significantly reduced duties mentioned above, the treaty also gave each state most-favoured nation status with respect to certain specified goods—French olive oil and British and French millinery—as well as to those commodities not specified in the agreement. Moreover, "the duties on some products were fixed in relation to certain existing duties. Thus, French wines were to pay no more than Portuguese wines were paying in 1786, while French import duties on Irish linens and British import duties on French linens were not to exceed existing duties on Dutch and Flemish linens."

=== Response to the Treaty ===
The new treaty was mostly received with support by the British government, and William Eden was rewarded accordingly. British industrialists and merchants of Britain believed that it would create a new age of mutually-advantageous trading between themselves and their French counterparts. For example, the Committee of Fustian Manufacturers wrote in a resolution passed in Manchester shortly after Eden and Reyneval agreed upon terms, "We are unanimously of opinion that the commercial treaty will be highly beneficial to the cotton manufacturers of this town."

Although the treaty was met cordially by the newer, larger-scale industries, the older, guild-like industries vehemently opposed the treaty. Sometimes, within an industry there were disputed interests regarding the treaty. For instance, the iron industry was divided into two sects: one in support of the treaty, and the other opposed to it. Pig and bar iron manufacturers favoured it because it offered them an opportunity to expand into the French markets. Hardware manufacturers, conversely, feared the treaty would put their expert craftsmanship in jeopardy of being replaced by cheaper, machine-made French goods.

Joint leader of the Fox-North Coalition that governed the House of Commons, Charles James Fox attacked the treaty during the ratification proceedings. He argued against allying with the French, a traditional enemy that, at that time, continued to strengthen their navy in the Channel. Fox passionately opposed the treaty insinuating that, as long as France was the most powerful country in Europe, Britain must challenge the French in order to maintain balance. And, based on that notion, in no way was strengthening the French economy beneficial for British merchants.

Despite Fox’s impassioned opposition, the treaty was ratified in both Houses largely due to William Pitt’s support for it. Pitt denounced the belief that Britain and France were bound to "eternal enmity" and argued that the treaty would alleviate the tensions that had precipitated between the two countries throughout history. The treaty was submitted to the King with a recommendation for approval on 8 March.

The treaty was not looked upon as favourably in France as it was in England. There was French opposition to the agreement because of two central complaints. First, similarly to the English craft industries, the French craft industries feared being replaced by cheaper machine-made goods from across the Channel. Moreover, the French craft industries had more traction in France than their English counterparts because of the known triumph of British industrial goods over French industrial goods. Second, the French believed their wines were still too highly taxed in comparison to Portuguese wines. After the treaty came into force, those French critics were proven right. The opening of the French ports allowed for cheap English textiles and hardware companies to dump their goods into France. The French became skeptical of the British, and it was widely believed that the British were depreciating their imports in order to flood the French markets.

=== Effects of the Treaty ===
In 1787, shortly after the treaty was enforced, there were reports of incendiary, violent actions taken in Abbeville, Normandy, and Bordeaux by cotton and wool manufacturers. Contemporary French critics of the Eden Treaty accredit the agreement with providing two detriments to the French economy. First, it led to an unprecedented expansion of British manufactured goods consumed in France, and "this flooding of the French market caused a commercial crisis which aggravated commercial distress and helped to bring about the Revolution." Whether this is true is still often disputed; although it is true that British exports increased by nearly 100% from 1787-1792, it is impossible to know what percentage of that increase should be accounted to the transfer of goods traded in the black market to legitimate channels. Secondly, the French commercial crisis is known to have started prior to 1786. And, though it is plausible that the treaty (via a dramatic influx of British goods) impeded improving economic circumstances in 1787 France, it is objectionable to hold the Eden Treaty responsible for the economic downturn which led to the French Revolution. Furthermore, the French criticisms regarding the insatiably high duties on French wine are less grounded because of the clarity with which the treaty laid out the policy towards wine imported into Britain—that they were to pay no more than the existing duty on Portuguese wine, and Britain reserved the right to continue to give a preference to Portuguese.

A memorandum issued by the Normandy Chamber of Commerce, which gained popularity throughout France, was highly critical of the treaty citing several advantages the British enjoyed over the French as an industrial economy ‘'because of the treaty'’. The memorandum argued that Britain’s availability of capital and credit, large supplies of cheap coal, high quality native wools, large-scale methods of production, and abundance of efficient, power-driven machinery, were all provided by the treaty. Though not entirely wrong, the memorandum fails to recognize that the British also had the advantages of having the highest wages relative to the price of coal, high wages relative to capital prices, high silver wages which created higher living standards, and an advantageous exchange rate —none of which were granted by the treaty nor at the expense of the French economy.

Also, some contemporary French critics consider the effects of the Treaty as one of the main causes of the War in the Vendée. For example, the production of the textile industry in Cholet collapsed between 1789 and 1791 apparently because of the import in France of little expensive British textile products. As a consequence, poverty and unemployment increased much in the Cholet district. Thus, the dissatisfied weavers apparently became a political threat for the French government.

=== Decline of the Treaty ===
The commercial treaty between France and Britain merely lasted five and a half years. The French harvest failed in 1788-89 and following the outbreak of the French Revolution, the Ancien Régime collapsed and with it the Eden Treaty.

Although the treaty was short-lived, it still has significance in economic history as it marks the end of an important phase of commercial relations between England and France, and, moreover, Europe. Prior to the treaty, it was accepted that high tariffs, prohibitory laws, and isolationist ideals were economically advantageous for each country. Though it failed, the Eden Treaty, along with Adam Smith’s Wealth of Nations, and the liberal publications emanating from the American Revolution and its subsequent Constitutional Convention, gave credence to a new economic policy that would eventually replace mercantilism.

== See also ==
- List of treaties
- Tariff of 1789
- Mercantilism
