= Convention of 1800 =

Treaty between the United States and France

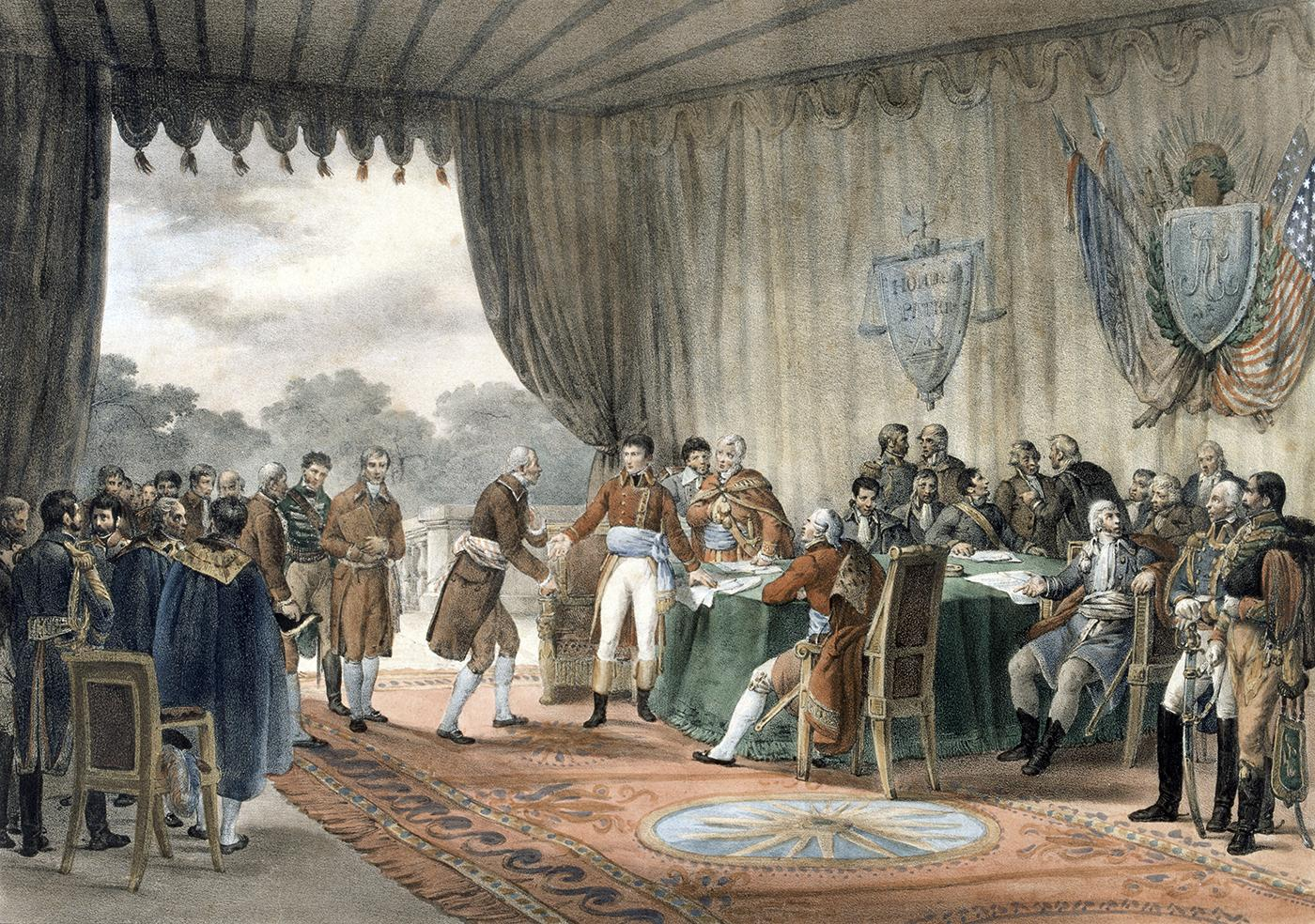
- The signing of the Convention at Mortefontaine, September 30, 1800
- Context: U.S. and France end the 1798–1800 Quasi-War and terminate the 1778 treaties of Alliance and Commerce
- Signed: 30 September 1800
- Location: Mortefontaine, France
- Effective: 21 December 1801
- Expiration: Eight years
- Signatories: Joseph Bonaparte; Claret de Fleurieu; Pierre Louis Roederer; Oliver Ellsworth; William Richardson Davie; William Vans Murray
- Parties: France; United States
- Languages: French and English

The Convention of 1800, also known as the Treaty of Mortefontaine (French: Traité de Mortefontaine), was signed on September 30, 1800, by the United States and France. The difference in name was due to congressional sensitivity at entering into treaties, due to disputes over the 1778 treaties of Alliance and Commerce between France and the U.S.

The Convention terminated the 1778 agreements, confirmed the principle of 'free trade, free goods' between the two countries and ended the 1798–1800 Quasi-War, an undeclared naval war waged primarily in the Caribbean. However, it failed to address the issue of compensation demanded by American ship owners for losses suffered before and during the Quasi-War, and as a result was not approved by Congress until December 1801.

By removing areas of friction between the two countries, it re-established Franco-American relations, and ultimately facilitated the 1803 Louisiana Purchase.

== Background ==
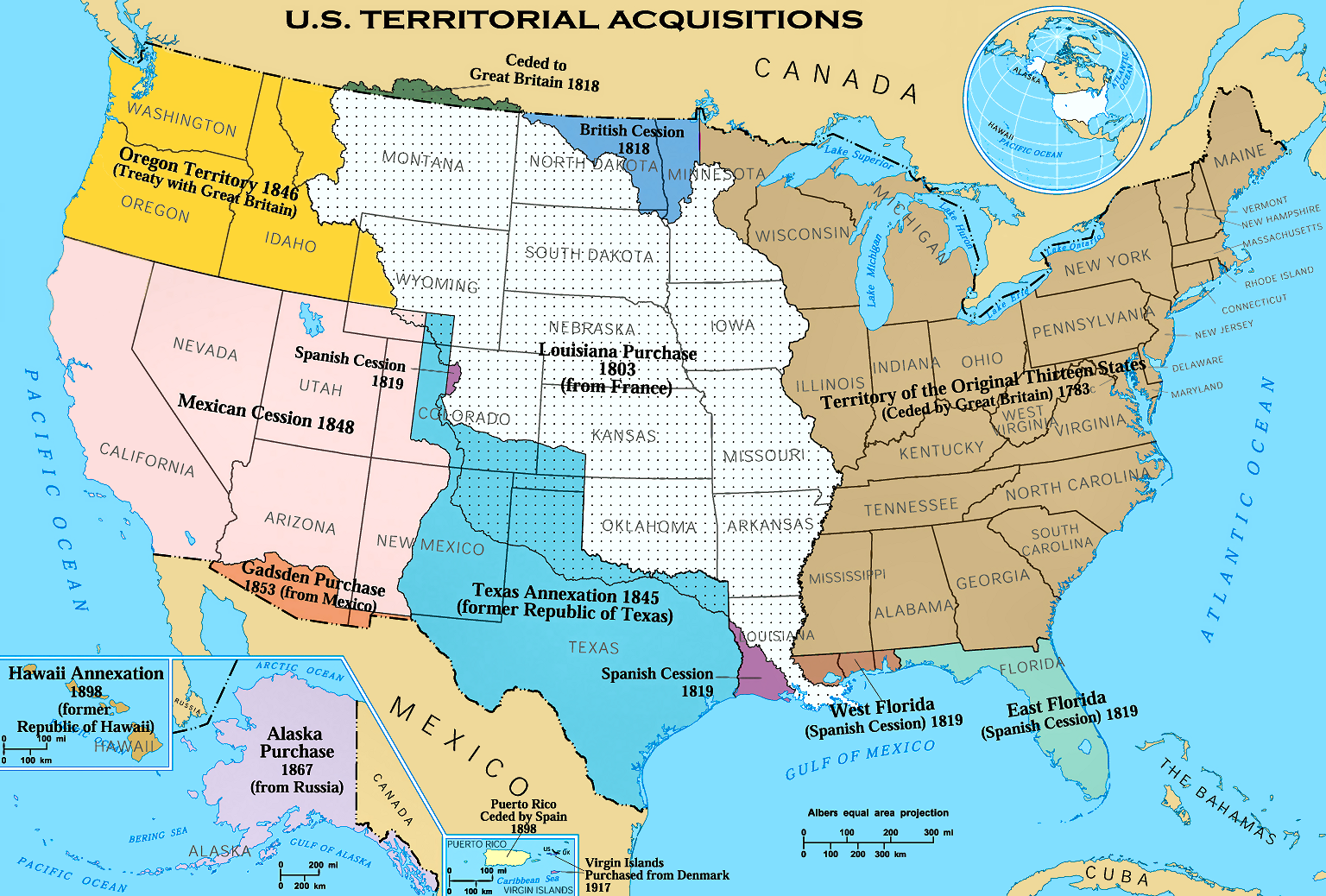
North America c. 1800: Louisiana; Spanish Florida

Under the Treaty of Alliance (1778) with the then Kingdom of France, in return for financial and military assistance in the American Revolutionary War, the United States agreed to defend French interests in the Caribbean. As the treaty had no termination date, in theory this included backing the French First Republic against Britain in the 1792–1797 War of the First Coalition. Despite popular enthusiasm for the French Revolution, there was little support for this in Congress, since neutrality allowed Northern shipowners to earn huge profits evading the British blockade of French ports, while Southern plantation-owners feared the example set by France's abolition of colonial slavery in 1794.

Arguing the Execution of Louis XVI in 1793 voided existing agreements, the American government passed the Neutrality Act of 1794, which unilaterally cancelled the military obligations of the 1778 treaty. France accepted, on the basis of "benevolent neutrality"; this meant allowing French privateers access to US ports, and the right to sell British prizes in American prize courts, but not vice versa.

It was soon apparent the U.S. interpreted "neutrality" differently, while the 1794 Jay Treaty with Britain directly contradicted the 1778 Treaty of Amity and Commerce. When France retaliated by seizing American ships trading with the British, an effective response was hampered by Jeffersonian resistance to a permanent military force. Instead, the U.S. suspended repayment of loans made by France during the Revolutionary War; efforts to resolve this through diplomacy ended in the 1797 dispute known as the XYZ Affair, which worsened the situation.

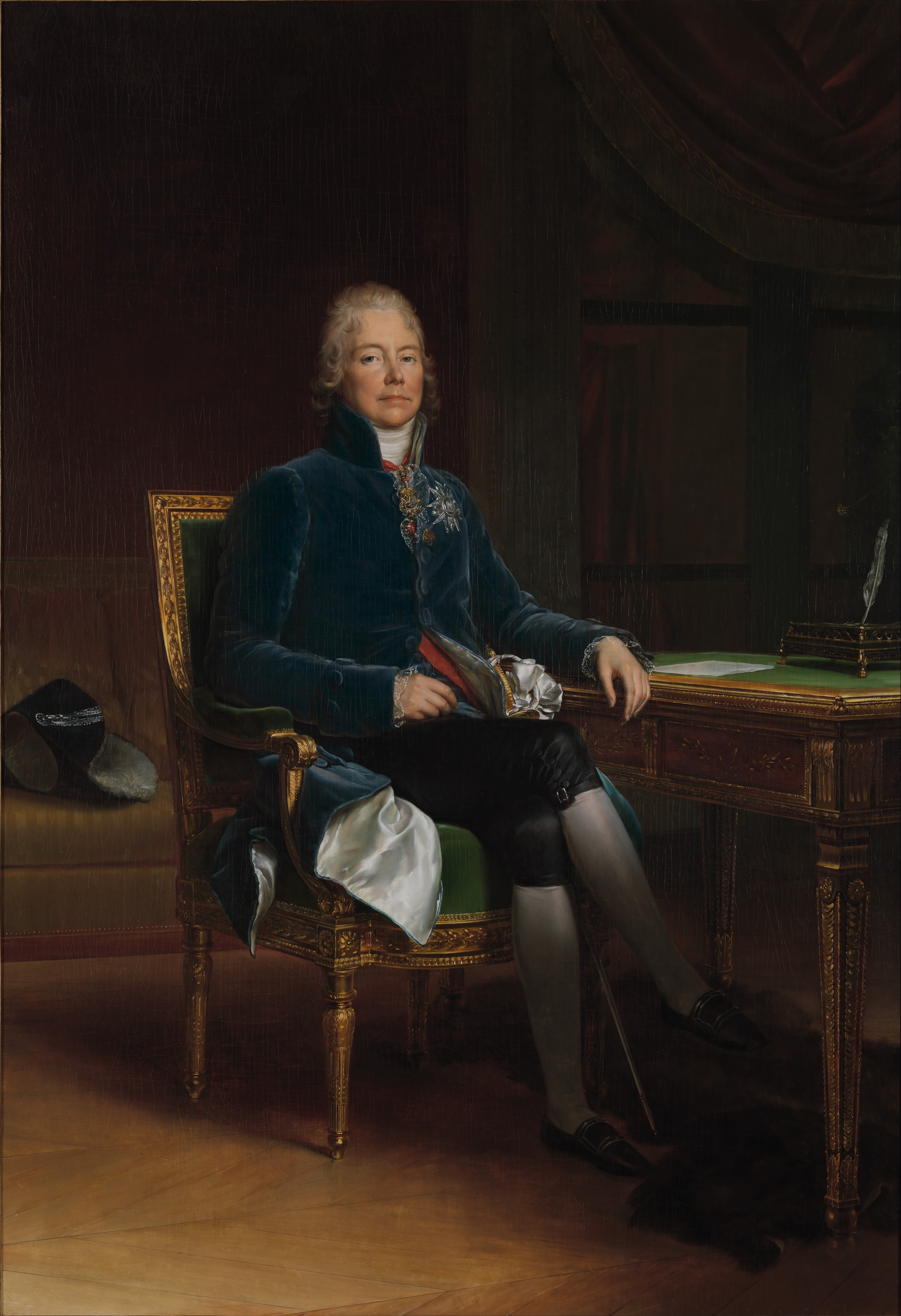
Portrait of Talleyrand by François Gérard. The French Foreign Minister Charles Maurice de Talleyrand-Périgord

The U.S. was also concerned by French ambitions in North America, especially in its former territory of Louisiana, acquired by Spain in 1762. For decades, American settlers had been moving into this area, despite diplomatic efforts to manage it, including the 1795 Pinckney's Treaty. By 1800, nearly 400,000 or 7.3% of Americans lived in trans-Appalachian territories, including the new states of Kentucky and Tennessee.

Western economic development required access to the Mississippi River, particularly the vital port of New Orleans, and the U.S. much preferred a weak Spain to an aggressive and powerful France on their western and southern borders. The discovery that French agents were conducting military surveys to determine how best to defend Louisiana led to the 1798 Alien and Sedition Acts.

With most of their fleet confined to port by the Royal Navy, the French relied on privateers operating off the U.S. coastline, and in the Caribbean. On July 7, 1798, Congress cancelled the 1778 Treaties and authorised attacks on French warships in American waters, resulting in the Quasi-War of 1798–1800. By arming 200 merchant ships, expanding the Navy, and informal co-operation with the British, the U.S. re-established control over its home waters.

However, President John Adams remained keen to reach a diplomatic solution, and in early 1799, a diplomatic commission was approved, consisting of William Vans Murray, Oliver Ellsworth, and William Richardson Davie. Their objectives were to formally terminate the 1778 treaties, confirm American neutrality, agree compensation for shipping losses and end the Quasi-War, although they did not arrive in Paris until early 1800.

During this delay, the French Directory was overthrown in November 1799, and replaced by the Consulate, headed by Napoleon. He was also keen on ending hostilities, since an important part of his support came from wealthy merchants, who wanted to re-establish their control over sugar-producing islands in the Caribbean. These were extremely profitable; prior to the abolition of slavery in 1793, the colony of Saint-Domingue produced more sugar and coffee than all the British West Indies combined.

== Negotiations ==
Oliver Ellsworth, a member of the U.S. Commission

Formal discussions with the recently re-appointed Foreign Minister Talleyrand did not begin until April and proceeded slowly. The main problem was the U.S. demand for $20 million compensation for shipping losses, which the Commissioners had been instructed to resolve before discussing revised treaties. As the French pointed out, measures taken by the Directory against American commerce had been annulled by the new government, while those imposed by the U.S. had just been renewed. They argued compensation only applied only if the 1778 treaties remained in force; either the U.S. confirmed the existing treaties and received compensation, or insisted on new ones and received none.

However, Talleyrand accepted the treaties could not be enforced, and preferred to reach an amicable agreement with the U.S., rather than drive it into an informal alliance with Britain, which was one impact of the Quasi-War. American neutrality was essential for French plans for North America; under the secret Third Treaty of San Ildefonso of October 1800, Spain agreed to transfer Louisiana to France in return for territories in Italy.

In July 1800, Russia, with informal French support, established the Second League of Armed Neutrality, whose signatories agreed to resist the British policy of searching neutral ships for contraband. This allowed Talleyrand to concede the principle of "free trade, free goods, freedom of convoy" demanded by the Americans, while victories at Marengo in June, and Hohenlinden in December forced Emperor Francis II to make peace. In the February 1801 Treaty of Lunéville, he ceded Austrian territories in Italy demanded by Spain in the Treaty of San Ildefonso.

== Terms ==
Talleyrand now had all the pieces in place to re-establish a French presence in North America; although the American commissioners did not have details of the Louisiana agreement, they were aware of the strength of his position and anxious to make a deal. The Convention signed on 30 September contained 27 clauses, the majority of which related to commercial affairs; these protected each other's merchants from having their goods confiscated, and guaranteed both sides most favoured nation trading status.

The most important and controversial was Clause II, which agreed to 'postpone' discussions on compensation, and suspended the 1778 treaties until this was resolved. Although the convention was dated September 30, 1800, arguments over the inclusion of Clause II meant Congress did not ratify the agreement until December 21, 1801. In the end, the U.S. government agreed to compensate its citizens for the claimed damages of $20 million, although it was only in 1915 the heirs finally received $3.9 million in settlement.

== Aftermath ==
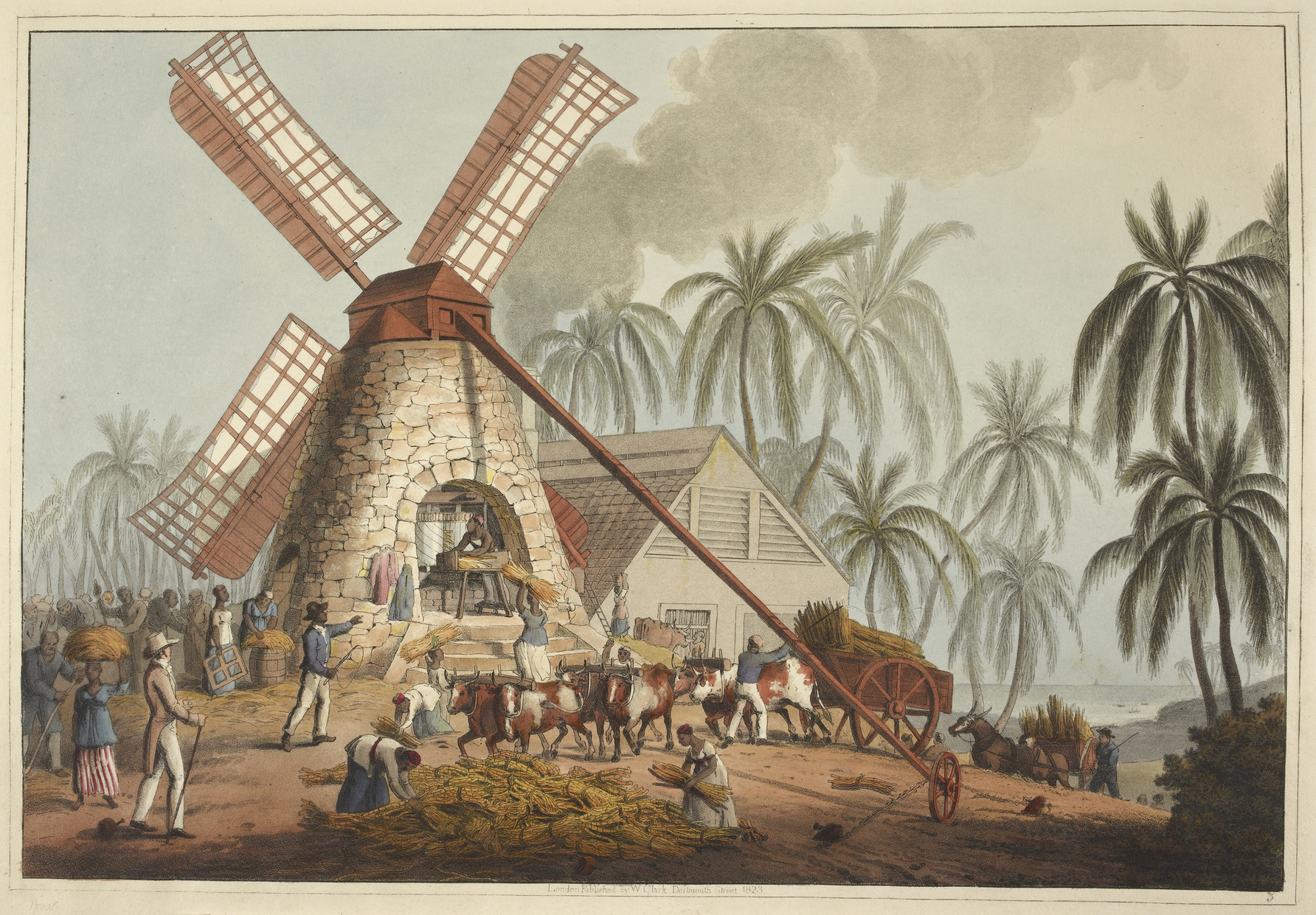
Caribbean sugar plantation, 1823; French economic objectives in North America were a key motive in negotiating the Convention

At the time, the convention was generally viewed unfavorably in the U.S., as it failed to agree compensation, or address concerns over French ambitions in North America. More recent historians argue that by ending the dispute with France, it ultimately facilitated the Louisiana Purchase, while reaching agreement on commercial terms was essential, since the U.S. was not strong enough to enforce them on its own.

Negotiations between France and Britain to end the War of the Second Coalition resulted in the March 1802 Treaty of Amiens; although widely viewed as a short-lived truce, it gave Napoleon an opportunity to activate his plans for North America. In December 1801, 30,000 veteran French troops were sent to Saint-Domingue, and soon after, Spain confirmed the transfer of Louisiana to France.

This caused great concern in Congress, but by 1803, it was clear the expedition was a catastrophic failure. Its leader, General Charles Leclerc, died of yellow fever, along with an estimated 22,000 of his men. Without Saint-Domingue, Napoleon concluded Louisiana was irrelevant, and with France and Britain once again on the verge of hostilities, he decided to sell the territory to fund his campaigns in Europe. In April 1803, the U.S. purchased the territory for $15 million, or 80 million francs.

== Sources ==
- Avalon Law Project. "Convention between the French Republic, and the United States of America". Avalon Law Project.
- Coleman, Aaron (2008). ""A Second Bounaparty?" A Reexamination of Alexander Hamilton during the Franco-American Crisis, 1796-1801". Journal of the Early Republic. 28 (2): 183–214. doi:10.1353/jer.0.0004. JSTOR 30043587. S2CID 143138929.
- Cox, Henry Bartholomew (1970). "A Nineteenth-Century Archival Search: The History of the French Spoliation Claims Papers". The American Archivist. 33 (4): 389–401. doi:10.17723/aarc.33.4.j1p8086n15k65716.
- Eclov, Jon Paul (2013). Informal Alliance: Royal Navy And U.S. Navy Co-Operation Against Republican France During The Quasi-War And Wars Of The French Revolution (PhD). University of North Dakota.
- Esdaile, Charles (2003). The Peninsular War: A New History. Palgrave Macmillan. ISBN 978-1-4039-6231-7.
- Hastedt, Glenn (2004). Encyclopedia of American Foreign Policy. Facts on File. ISBN 0816046425.
- Hyneman, Charles (1930). "Neutrality during the European Wars of 1792–1815: America's Understanding Of Her Obligations". The American Journal of International Law. 24 (2): 279–309. doi:10.2307/2189404. JSTOR 2189404. S2CID 147162918.
- Irwin, Douglas; Sylla, Richard (2010). Founding Choices: American Economic Policy in the 1790s. University of Chicago Press. ISBN 978-0-226-38475-7.
- Kemp, Roger, ed. (2010). Documents of American Democracy. McFarland & Co. ISBN 978-0786442102.
- King, Rufus. "Madison Papers; To James Madison from Rufus King, 29 March 1801". Founders Archives. Original source: The Papers of James Madison, Secretary of State Series, vol. 1, 4 March–31 July 1801.
- Lyon, E Wilson (1940). "The Franco-American Convention of 1800". The Journal of Modern History. XII (3): 305–333. doi:10.1086/236487. JSTOR 1874761. S2CID 144516482.
- McLynn, Frank (1997). Napoleon; a biography. Jonathan Cape. ISBN 978-0224040723.
- Rodriguez, Junius P (2002). The Louisiana Purchase: A Historical and Geographical Encyclopedia. ABC-CLIO.
- Rohrs, Richard (1988). "The Federalist Party and the Convention of 1800". Diplomatic History. 12 (3): 237–260. doi:10.1111/j.1467-7709.1988.tb00475.x. JSTOR 24911802.
- Smith, James Morton (1956). Freedom's Fetters: Alien and Sedition Laws and American Civil Liberties (1966 ed.). Cornell University Press. ISBN 0801490332.
- Young, Christopher J (2011). "Connecting the President and the People: Washington's Neutrality, Genet's Challenge, and Hamilton's Fight for Public Support". Journal of the Early Republic. 31 (3): 435–466. doi:10.1353/jer.2011.0040. JSTOR 41261631. S2CID 144349420.
