= Model Treaty =

1776 template for future American international relations

The Model Treaty, or the Plan of 1776, was a template for commercial treaties that the United States planned to make with foreign powers during the American Revolution against Great Britain. It was drafted by the Continental Congress to secure economic resources for the war effort, and to serve as an idealistic guide for future relations and treaties between the new American government and other nations. The Model Treaty thus marked the revolution's turning point towards seeking independence, and is subsequently considered a milestone in U.S. foreign relations.

== Background ==
Tensions between American colonists and the British Crown began in 1765 with the passage of the widely unpopular Stamp Act. An ensuing cycle of often-violent protests and reprisals culminated into open warfare in April 1775.

Shortly thereafter, King George III formally recognized the conflict as an act of "rebellion and sedition" leading to George III declaration of the Proclamation of Rebellion. On December 6, 1775, the Continental Congress responded to the Court of St James's that it was only resisting parliament's unjust laws and hoped to avoid the "calamities" of a "civil war". Once it became clear that both sides had reached an impasse, the movement towards independence gained traction, and consequently many revolutionary leaders sought to develop foreign relations befitting a sovereign nation.

== Drafting ==
George Wythe, Virginia's delegate to the Continental Congress, was one of the earliest and most notable proponents for seeking a foreign alliance. His suggestion was formally taken into consideration by a committee, with John Adams of Massachusetts being among the most enthusiastic supporters: as early as February and March 1776, he wrote in his diary about the advantages of trading with France, speculating that the French would support the colonies' separation from their long-time rival. Adams even drafted what would become a preliminary version of the Model Treaty in his diary.

On June 11, 1776, the Continental Congress resolved to create a special committee "to prepare a plan of treaties to be proposed to foreign powers", along with committees for drafting the Declaration of Independence and the Articles of Confederation, respectively. The following day, the committee to draft a "Model Treaty" was formally established with five appointed members: Adams, John Dickinson, Benjamin Franklin, Benjamin Harrison, and Robert Morris. As an early progenitor of the Model Treaty, Adams would ultimately be the primary drafter, and the resulting document largely reflected his plans.

== Purpose ==
The Model Treaty was not with a specific country, but rather was a template for future relations with foreign countries; it was also America's first diplomatic statement as an independent country, reflecting its ideals of free and reciprocal trade. It was also a practical document, reflecting America's existing non-political trade arrangements with France and Spain that Robert Morris had established as chairman of the Secret Committee; the Model Treaty was to formalize these arrangements as being between governments rather than individual representatives.

Reflecting Adams' initial vision, the Model Treaty was silent on military assistance and had three main components, all commercial in nature:

1. Free ports to guarantee free goods
2. Freedom of neutrals to trade in normal goods
3. Agreement on a contraband list.

On behalf of the Model Treaty Committee, Adams presented a general draft before the Continental Congress on July 18, 1776, which was formally adopted on September 17. A week later, Congress selected commissioners to France to negotiate a treaty based on the template provided in the Model Treaty. Benjamin Franklin took the Model Treaty to Paris, and it was used as the starting point for negotiations with France, which ultimately resulted in the signing of two treaties: an economic treaty, the Treaty of Amity and Commerce, and a treaty of military alliance, the Treaty of Alliance.

== Treaty-making power ==
The Articles of Confederation declares the provisions relative to the United States treaty-making power generally defined as jus tractatuum. The treaty powers are defined in Article Six and Article Nine of the Articles of Confederation ratified on July 8, 1778.

== See also ==
- Article Two of the United States Constitution
- Continental Congress
- Franco-American alliance
- Lee Resolution
- Perpetual Union
- Treaty of Alliance (1778)
- Treaty of Amity and Commerce (France–United States)
- Treaty of Amity and Commerce (Prussia–United States)
- Treaty of Amity and Commerce (United States–Sweden)
- Treaty of Paris (1783)
