= Joseph Matthias Gérard de Rayneval =

French diplomat and government minister

Joseph-Mathias Gérard de Rayneval
- Born: 24 February 1736; Masevaux, Haut-Rhin, France
- Died: 31 December 1812 (aged 76); Paris, France
- Occupations: Diplomat, Government Minister
- Office: Under-Secretary of State for Foreign Affairs and Trade
- Spouse: Sophie Gaucherel (m. 1776)
- Children: Adélaïde Gérard de Rayneval (1777-1860); Maximilien Gérard de Rayneval (1778-1836), Baron; Alexandrine-Sophie Gérard de Rayneval (1780-1823)
- Parent(s): Claude Gérard, Marie-Françoise Wetzel
- Relatives: Conrad-Alexandre Gérard, comte de Munster (brother)
- Awards: Royal Order of Charles III

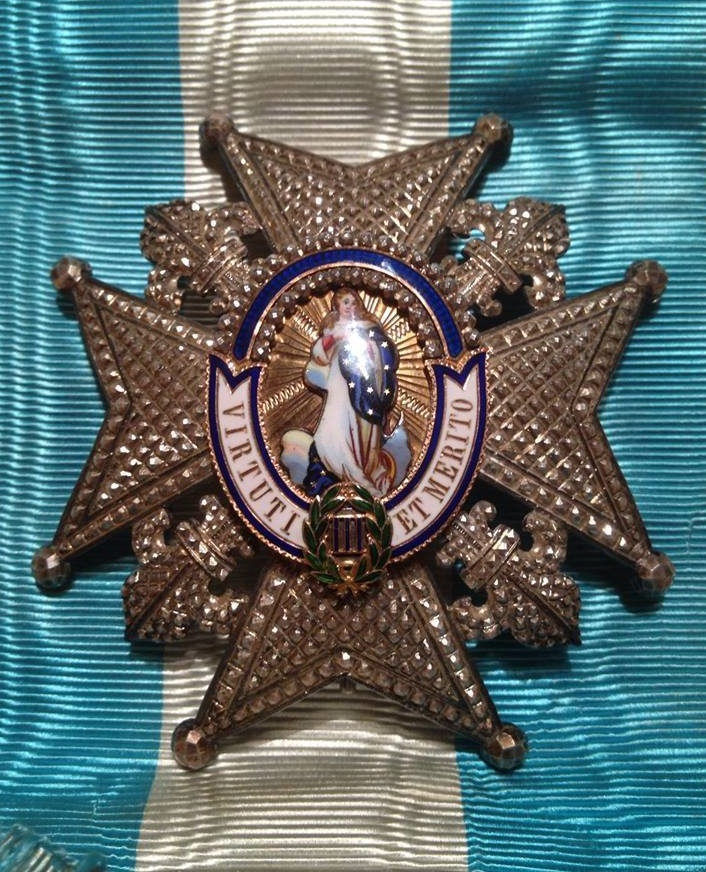
Royal Order of Charles III insignia

Joseph-Mathias Gérard de Rayneval (24 February 1736, Masevaux, Haut-Rhin – 31 December 1812, Paris), was a French diplomat and government minister of the Ancien Régime.

== Career ==
Gérard de Rayneval served under the Bourbon Foreign Minister, Charles Gravier de Vergennes, as Under-Secretary of State for Foreign Affairs and Trade. In 1776, he produced a memo on France's strategic and diplomatic interests entitled Reflections on the Situation in America.

In 1782, he was sent on a secret mission to London to make peace feelers and later undertook official diplomatic visits that led to the Eden Agreement.

John Jay, a Founding Father of the United States, upon learning of the trips suspected French duplicity, leading him to begin separate negotiations with the British. He wrote about his negotiations with Jay over the Mississippi:

If by the future treaty of peace, Spain preserves West Florida, she alone will be the sole proprietor of the course of the Mississippi from the thirty-first degree of latitude to the mouth of this river. Whatever may be the case with that part which is beyond this point to the north, the United States of America can have no pretentions to it, not being masters of either border to this river.

On 30 November, preliminary articles of peace were signed but it took a year, until 3 September 1783, for the Paris Peace Treaty to be signed.

Chevalier Gérard de Rayneval was appointed to the Royal Order of Charles III and served in King Louis XVI's Conseil d'Etat.

== Family ==
He was the fourth son of Claude Gérard, of Masmünster in Alsace, by his wife Marie-Françoise Wetzel.

In Paris on 8 August 1776, he married Sophie Gaucherel and had by her three children:

- Adélaïde Gérard de Rayneval (1777-1860);
- Maximilien Gérard de Rayneval (1778-1836), created a Baron;
- Alexandrine-Sophie Gérard de Rayneval (1780-1823).

His eldest brother was Conrad-Alexandre Gérard, comte de Munster.

== See also ==
- List of Ambassadors of France to Great Britain
- Mailly-Raineval
- Melville Henry Massue
