= Committee of Secret Correspondence =

Intelligence agency during the American Revolution

The Committee of Secret Correspondence was a committee formed by the Second Continental Congress and active from 1775 to 1776. The Committee played a large role in attracting French aid and alliance during the American Revolution. In 1777, the Committee of Secret Correspondence was renamed the Committee of Foreign Affairs.

== Creation ==
With the American Revolutionary War approaching, the Second Continental Congress, which took place in Philadelphia in 1775, recognized the need for international allies to help the Thirteen Colonies in their fight for independence from Great Britain. To satisfy this need, the Congress created the Committee of Secret Correspondence.

RESOLVED, That a committee...would be appointed for the sole purpose of corresponding with our friends in Great Britain, and other parts of the world, and that they lay their correspondence before Congress when directed.

RESOLVED, That this Congress will make provision to defray all such expenses as they may arise by carrying on such correspondence, and for the payment of such agents as the said Committee may send on this service.

== Duties ==
The Committee of Secret Correspondence was created for "the sole purpose of corresponding with our friends in Great Britain and other parts of the world". However, most of the efforts of the committee went not to making friends in Great Britain, but towards forging alliances with other foreign countries that would sympathize with the patriot cause during the American Revolution.

While forming foreign alliances, the committee also employed secret agents abroad to gain foreign intelligence, conducted undercover operations, started American propaganda campaigns to gain patriot support, analyzed foreign publications to gain additional foreign intelligence, and developed a maritime unit separate from the Navy. It also served as the "clearinghouse" for foreign communications with foreign countries.

== Original members ==
The original members of the Committee of Secret Correspondence were Benjamin Franklin, Benjamin Harrison V, Thomas Johnson, John Jay, Robert Morris, and John Dickinson.

The most active member of the Committee of Secret Correspondence was Benjamin Franklin. Franklin, a successful scientist, journalist, and politician was an expert when it came to foreign affairs. He sent letters to Don Gabriel de Bourbon, a Spanish Prince, and Americanophiles in France to try to rally support for the American cause. He also travelled to France to convince the French to forge an alliance with the United States and was a prominent figure in the signing of the Treaty of Paris in 1783, which ended the revolution.

== Significance of the "Secrecy" ==
Since the Committee of Secret Correspondence put much of its efforts into gaining patriot sympathy abroad to be used during the American Revolution, they requested of the Continental Congress that the members and actions of the committee be kept confidential, so that Great Britain would not hear about the United States forging foreign alliances for the looming revolution. Another reason the Committee wanted its members and actions kept quiet was because the committee had many undercover agents on missions overseas gaining information about the political and economic situation in other countries, and if other countries heard about these undercover agents they would be exposed and their missions ruined. For example, in 1776, the Committee was instructing Silas Deane, an undercover agent in France, on how to interact with the French government and encourage them to provide munitions and ships to the United States.

In response to this request for secrecy, Congress did several things. First of all, Congress agreed to the "withholding the names of the persons they [the Committee of Secret Correspondence] has employed, or with whom they have corresponded." In addition, Congress recorded all of the decisions regarding the Committee of Secret Correspondence in "Secret Journals", separate from the public journals used to record its decisions concerning other matters. Finally, it allowed the committee to establish its own oath of secrecy, which was put in place on November 29, 1775 as well as a secrecy agreement for government employees. The oath and agreement are below.

RESOLVED, That every member of this Congress considers himself under the ties of virtue, honour and love of his country, not to divulge, directly or indirectly, any matter or thing agitated or debated in Congress, before the same shaft have been determined, without the leave of the Congress: nor any matter or thing determined in Congress, which a majority of the Congress shall order to be kept secret, And that if any member shall violate this agreement, he shall be expelled this Congress, and deemed an enemy to the liberties of America, and liable to be treated as such, and that every member signify his consent to this agreement by signing the same.

I do solemnly swear, that I will not directly or indirectly divulge any manner or thing which shall come to my knowledge as (clerk, secretary) of the Board of War and Ordnance for the United Colonies... So help me God.

== Julien Alexandre Achard de Bonvouloir and the Committee of Secret Correspondence ==
In 1775, the French cabinet was faced with a conflict in trying to decide whether or not to support the Patriots in the American Revolution. Supporting the Patriots would be an ideal opportunity for France to try to regain lost land in North America as well as dampen Great Britain's economic and political strength by winning the revolution. On the other hand, the French were hesitant to support the Patriots, in case their success inspired other French colonies to attempt the same type of rebellion.

Before making a decision, the French cabinet decided it was necessary to acquire more information about the social, economic, and political situation in the United States. To do this, the cabinet chose Julien Alexandre Achard de Bonvouloir, a 26-year-old former French officer, to travel to the United States as an undercover agent, and make contact with the Continental Congress.

While in the United States, Bonvouloir had three meetings with the Committee of Secret Correspondence from December 18 and 27. During the meeting, Benjamin Franklin and John Jay were continuously debating how much information about the state of their country they should tell the Frenchman, as they knew there was a chance that he was a spy. The Committee told Bonvouloir that the United States was serious in its plan to separate from Great Britain. They then asked Bonvouloir about France's opinion of the North American colonies and about obtaining arms, munitions, and engineer officers from France.

As a result of these discussions, when Bonvouloir returned to France and shared his discoveries with the French government, they agreed to "give you [United States] secretly a million livres" as well as "convince the Court of Spain to unite in giving you another." Although the aid the French gave the Americans during the revolutionary war was confidential, the alliance became formal with the signing of the Treaty of Amity and Commerce on February 6, 1778. The main reason that France wanted this secrecy was to avoid fighting with Britain, which would be angry and threatened if it discovered France was providing aid to their rebelling colonies.

France's desire to keep their aid to the United States secret was evident during the 1777 incident involving Arthur Lee and Silas Deane. Lee, who frequently aided the Committee of Secret Correspondence, suspected Silas Deane, a colonial agent in France, of financial wrongdoing. In order to prove Deane's wrongdoings, information about the French aid to the United States would need to be released. However, French minister Gerard insisted that the information be kept confidential, and on January 12, 1779, Congress passed a resolution that denied any French aid to the United States.

== Silas Deane and the Committee of Secret Correspondence ==
At the same time as the Committee was undergoing negotiations with Bonvouloir in the United States, they were also instructing Silas Deane, a Connecticut delegate for the Continental Congress. Deane was on an undercover assignment in France, trying to convince the French that the United States really were ready to fight for independence, and convince them to aid the United States in their fight. This information was very similar to the information the Committee of Secret Correspondence was telling Bonvouloir back in the United States. Deane was able to achieve unofficial financial and military support from the French in the forms of arms and ships. Then, Benjamin Franklin, who arrived in France in December 1776, was able to make the alliance official with the signing of the Treaty of Amity and Commerce in 1778.

== Effect of the Committee of Secret Correspondence on the American Revolution ==
The Committee of Secret Correspondence was replaced by the Committee of Foreign Affairs on April 17, 1777. But, the Committee of Secret Correspondence is remembered for its influence on the success of the American Revolution. The Committee initiated contact with France and helped convince its officials to forge an alliance and aid the United States; this aid was critical to the Patriots' gaining independence from Britain. Once convinced to aid the Patriots, France made major contributions to the war effort. For example, French fleets under General Degrasse and Rochambeau blockaded the Chesapeake Bay at the Siege of Yorktown, preventing British escape, and assisting Washington's patriot army's attack. This successful military effort led to the surrender of British General Cornwallis and a few days later the resignation of the British Prime Minister, Lord Frederick North.

After the surrender, the British signed the Treaty of Paris, on September 3, 1783. It was negotiated by John Jay and Benjamin Franklin, former members of the Committee of Secret Correspondence. George Woodbridge recognized the French contributions, especially of Rochambeau in relation to Yorktown:

The strategy of the campaign was Rochambeau’s; the French fleet was there as a result of his arrangements; the tactics of the battle were his; the American army was present because he had lent money to Washington; in total naval and military participants the French outnumbered the Americans between three and four to one. Yorktown was Rochambeau’s victory.

== See also ==
- Committee of correspondence
- Founding Fathers of the United States
- Paul Wentworth (spy)
- Edward Bancroft
