= Conrad Alexandre Gérard de Rayneval =

French diplomat (1729–1790)

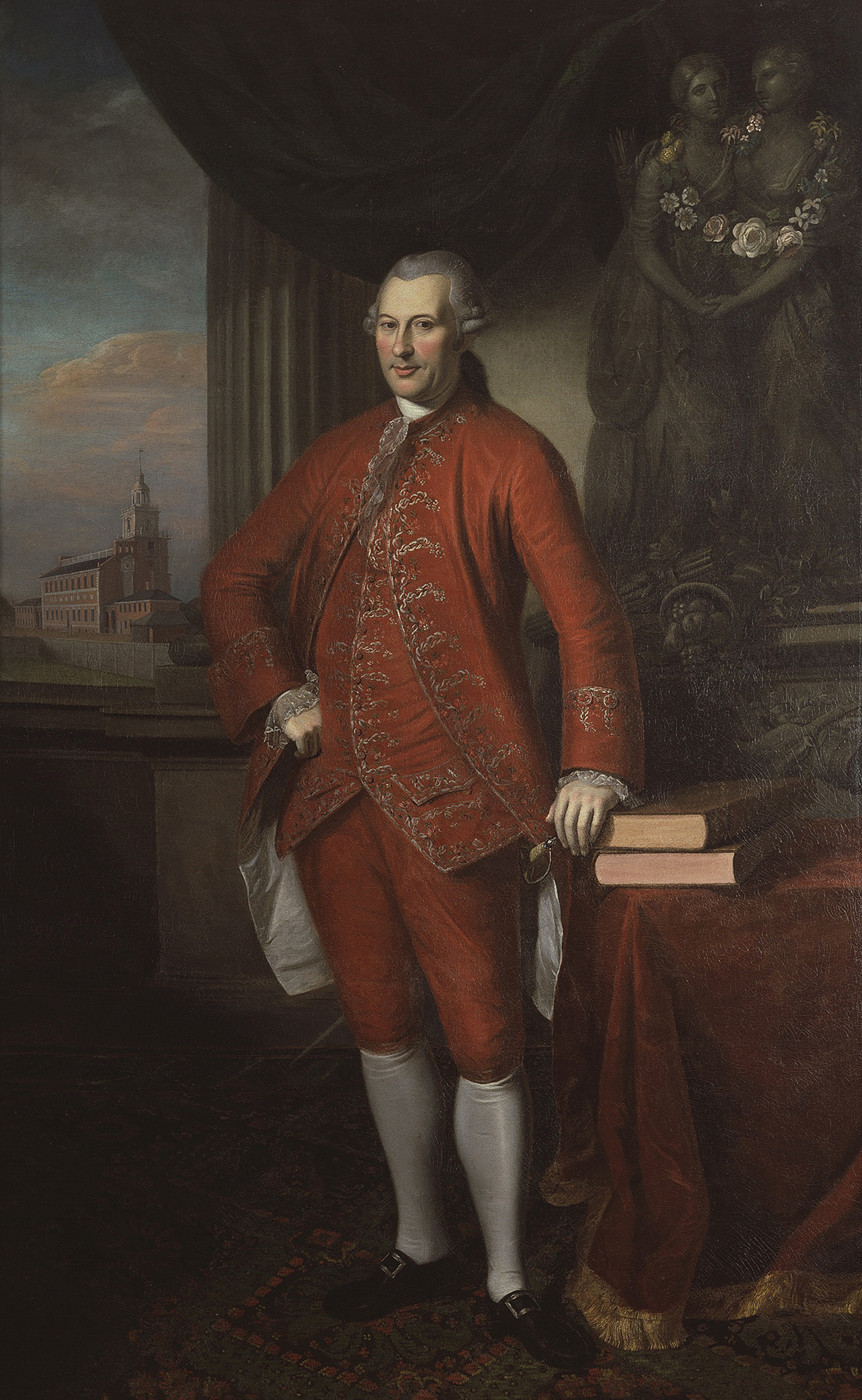
1779 portrait of Gérard

Conrad Alexandre Gérard de Rayneval (French pronunciation: [kɔ̃ʁad alɛksɑ̃dʁ ʒeʁaʁ də ʁɛnval]; 12 December 1729 – 16 April 1790), was a French diplomat, born at Masevaux in upper Alsace (now Haut-Rhin). He is best known as the first French diplomatic representative to the United States. His brother Joseph Matthias Gérard de Rayneval was also a diplomat.

== Life ==
Conrad Alexandre Gérard served as secretary of the French legation to the Elector Palatine at Mannheim from 1753 to 1759, and secretary of the French Embassy to Austria at Vienna from 1761 to 1766. In July 1766 he was recalled to Paris to become secretary of the Council of State and chief clerk in the Bureau of Foreign Affairs. In 1779, he was elected to the American Philosophical Society.

Early in 1778, under instructions from Vergennes, he conducted the negotiations with the American representatives, Benjamin Franklin, Silas Deane, and Arthur Lee, which resulted in the signing of the Treaty of Alliance and the Treaty of Amity and Commerce with the United States on February 6, 1778. In March, 1778, he travelled to America, as the first accredited Minister from France to the United States. He sailed in company with Silas Deane aboard the comte d'Estaing's flagship of the seventeen-ship battle fleet transporting four thousand French troops. Congress welcomed Gerard on July 14, one day before it opened investigations into charges against Deane.

This post he held until superseded by the Chevalier de la Luzerne, in September, 1779. His activity in America consisted chiefly in subsidizing writers — of whom Thomas Paine was the best known — to create a sentiment favorable to a closer French alliance, and in somewhat questionable relations with various members of Congress, who were the recipients of "gifts" from him. His communications to Congress were, for the most part, oral addresses delivered at their secret sessions. During his residence in America he received the degree of LL.D. from Yale, and on his return to France was made a Councilor of State.

He was also enrolled as a member of the Society of the Cincinnati.

== Sources ==
- Modified from the article in The New International Encyclopaedia, Vol. VIII, p. 267 (1903, public domain).

== Bibliography ==
- Patton, Robert H.(2008). Patriot Pirates: The Privateer War for Freedom and Fortune in the American Revolution, Pantheon Books.
