= Treaty of Amity and Commerce (France–United States) =

1778 treaty between the United States and France

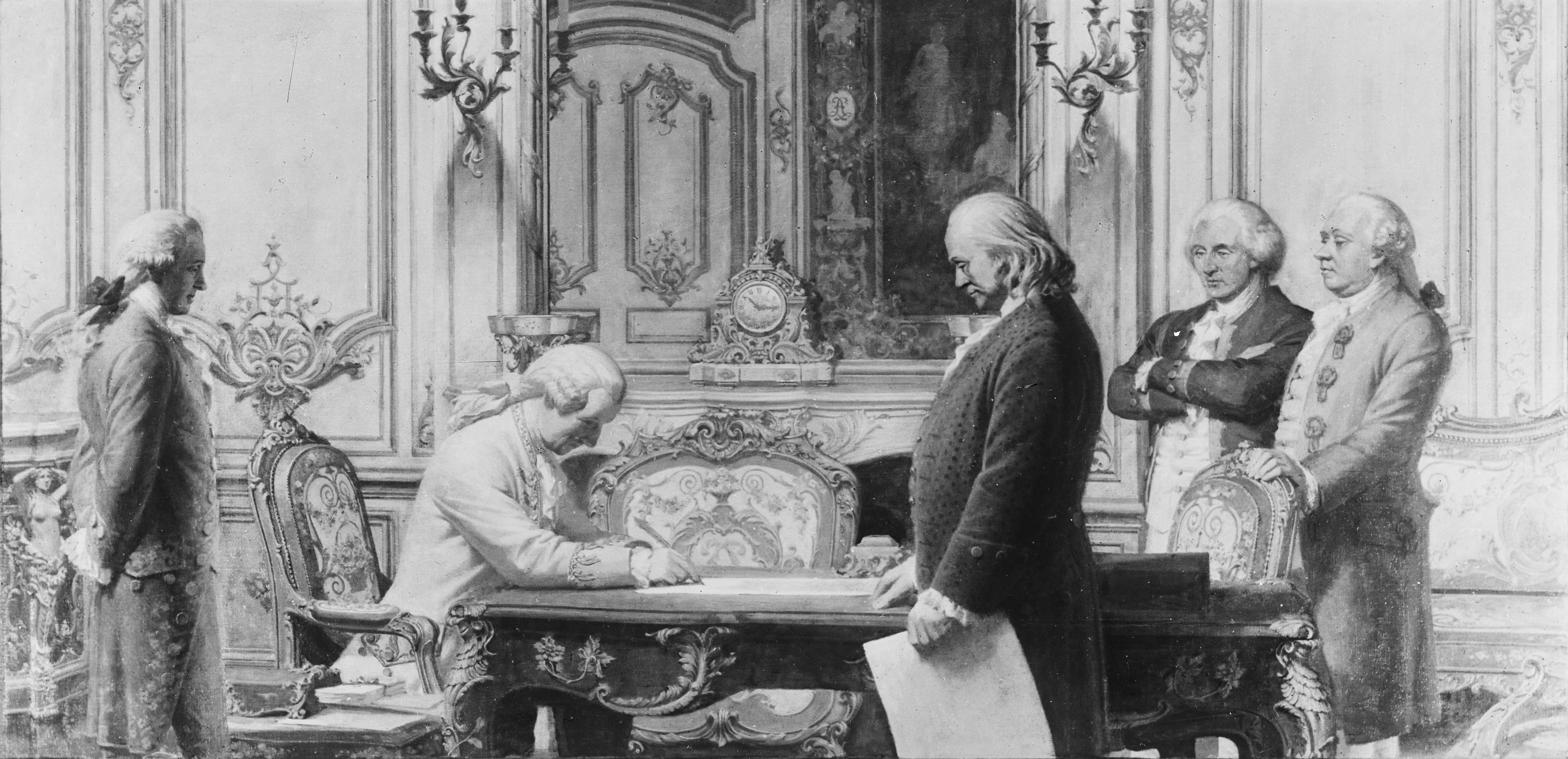
A depiction of the signing by Charles E. Mills

The Treaty of Amity and Commerce established formal diplomatic and commercial relations between the United States and France during the American Revolutionary War. It was signed on February 6, 1778, in Paris, together with its sister agreement, the Treaty of Alliance, and a separate, secret clause allowing Spain and other European nations to join the alliance. These were the first treaties negotiated by the fledgling United States, and the resulting alliance proved pivotal to American victory in the war; the agreements are sometimes collectively known as the Franco-American Alliance or the Treaties of Alliance.

The Treaty of Amity and Commerce recognized the independence of the U.S. and established mutual commercial and navigation rights between the two nations; it served as an alternative to the British Navigation Acts, which restricted American access to foreign markets. The Treaty of Alliance established a mutual defense pact, forbidding either nation from making a separate peace with Britain, and guaranteeing French support for the Americans should the British violate their peace with France.

Due to the critical material, financial, and military support secured by the treaties, their successful negotiation is considered the "single most important diplomatic success of the colonists". However, later complications with the Treaty of Alliance led to America forgoing any formal military alliance until the Declaration by United Nations in 1942.

== Background ==
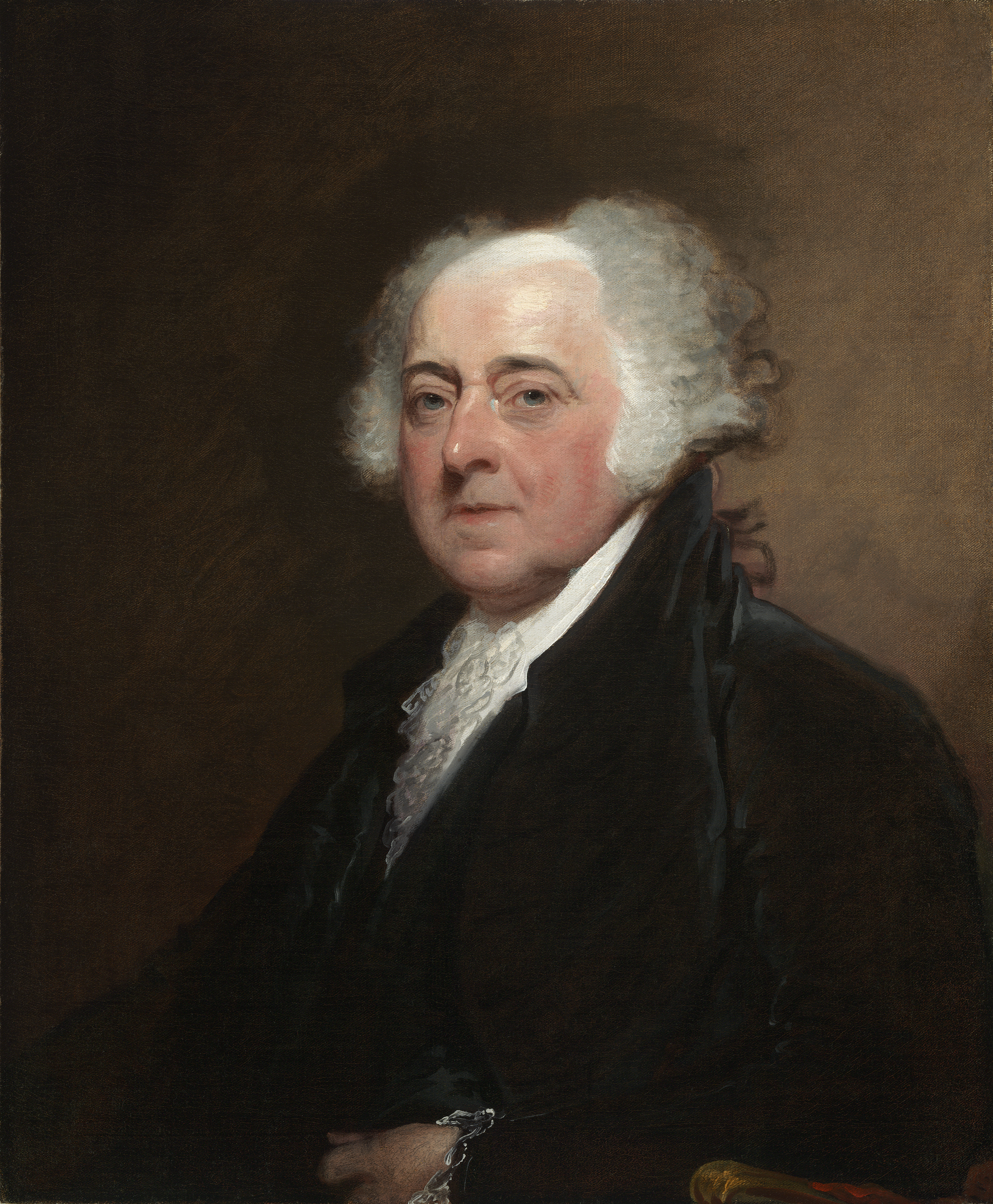
John Adams, an early supporter and initial author of an alliance with France

Early in 1776, as members of the Second Continental Congress began to move closer to declaring independence from Britain, leading American statesmen began to consider the benefits of forming foreign alliances to assist in their rebellion against the British Crown. The most obvious potential ally was France, a long-time enemy and colonial rival of Britain who had lost much of their colonial possessions in the Americas after the French and Indian War. As a result, John Adams began drafting conditions for a possible commercial treaty between France and the future independent colonies of the United States, which declined the presence of French troops and any aspect of French authority in colonial affairs. Congress sent Silas Deane to France to negotiate.

On September 25 the Continental Congress ordered Benjamin Franklin and Arthur Lee to seek a treaty with France based upon Adams's draft treaty that had later been formalized into a Model Treaty which sought the establishment of reciprocal trade relations with France but declined to mention any possible military assistance from the French government. Despite orders to seek no direct military assistance from France, the American commissioners were instructed to work to acquire most favored nation trading relations with France, along with additional military aid, and also encouraged to reassure any Spanish delegates that the United States had no desire to acquire Spanish lands in the Americas, in the hopes that Spain would in turn enter a Franco-American alliance.

Despite an original openness to the alliance, after word of the Declaration of Independence and a British evacuation of Boston reached France, the French Foreign Minister, Comte de Vergennes, put off signing a formal alliance with the United States after receiving news of British victories over American General George Washington in New York. With the help of the Committee of Secret Correspondence, established by the Continental Congress to promote the American cause in France, and his standing as a model of republican simplicity within French society, Benjamin Franklin was able to gain a secret loan and clandestine military assistance from the Foreign Minister but was forced to put off negotiations on a formal alliance while the French government negotiated a possible alliance with Spain.

With the American victory at the Battles of Saratoga and growing rumors of secret British peace offers to Franklin, France sought to seize an opportunity to take advantage of the rebellion and abandoned negotiations with Spain to begin discussions with the United States on a formal alliance. With official approval to begin negotiations on a formal alliance given by King Louis XVI, the colonies turned down a British proposal for reconciliation in January 1778 and began negotiations that would result in the signing of the Treaty of Alliance and Treaty of Amity and Commerce.

== Terms and provisions ==
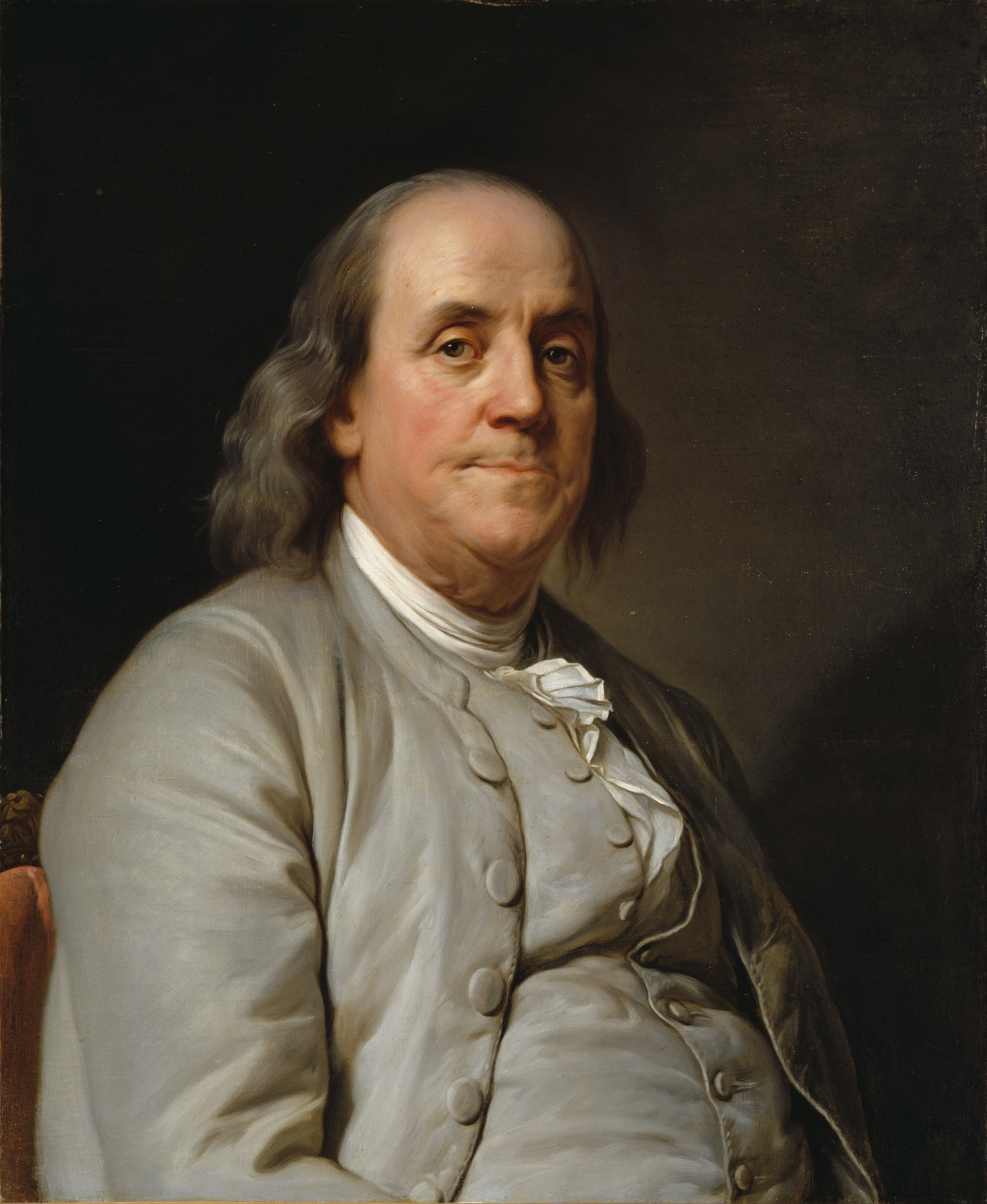
Benjamin Franklin's celebrity like status in France helped win French support for the United States during the American Revolutionary War.

The treaty established a comprehensive framework for mutual diplomatic, commercial, and navigational cooperation.

- Peace and friendship between the U.S. and France
- Mutual most favored nation status with regard to commerce and navigation
- Mutual protection of all vessels and cargo when in U.S. or French jurisdiction
- Ban on fishing in waters possessed by the other with exception of the Banks of Newfoundland
- Mutual right for citizens of one country to hold land in other's territory
- Mutual right to search a ship of the other's coming out of an enemy port for contraband
- Right to due process of law if contraband is found on an allied ship and only after being officially declared contraband may it be seized
- Mutual protection of men-of-war and privateers and their crews from harm from the other party and reparations to be paid if this provision is broken
- Restoration of stolen property taken by pirates
- Right of ships of war and privateers to freely carry ships and goods taken for their enemy
- Mutual assistance, relief, and safe harbor to ships, both of War and Merchant, in crisis in the other's territory
- Neither side may commission privateers against the other nor allow foreign privateers that are enemies of either side to use their ports
- Mutual right to trade with enemy states of the other as long as those goods are not contraband
- If the two nations become enemies six months protection of merchant ships in enemy territory
- To prevent quarrels between allies all ships must carry passports and cargo manifests
- If two ships meet ships of war and privateers must stay out of cannon range but may board the merchant ship to inspect her passports and manifests
- Mutual right to inspection of a ship's cargo to only happen once
- Mutual right to have consuls, vice consuls, agents, and commissaries of one nation in the other's ports
- France grants one or more ports under its control to be free ports to ships of the United States

== Signing and ratification ==
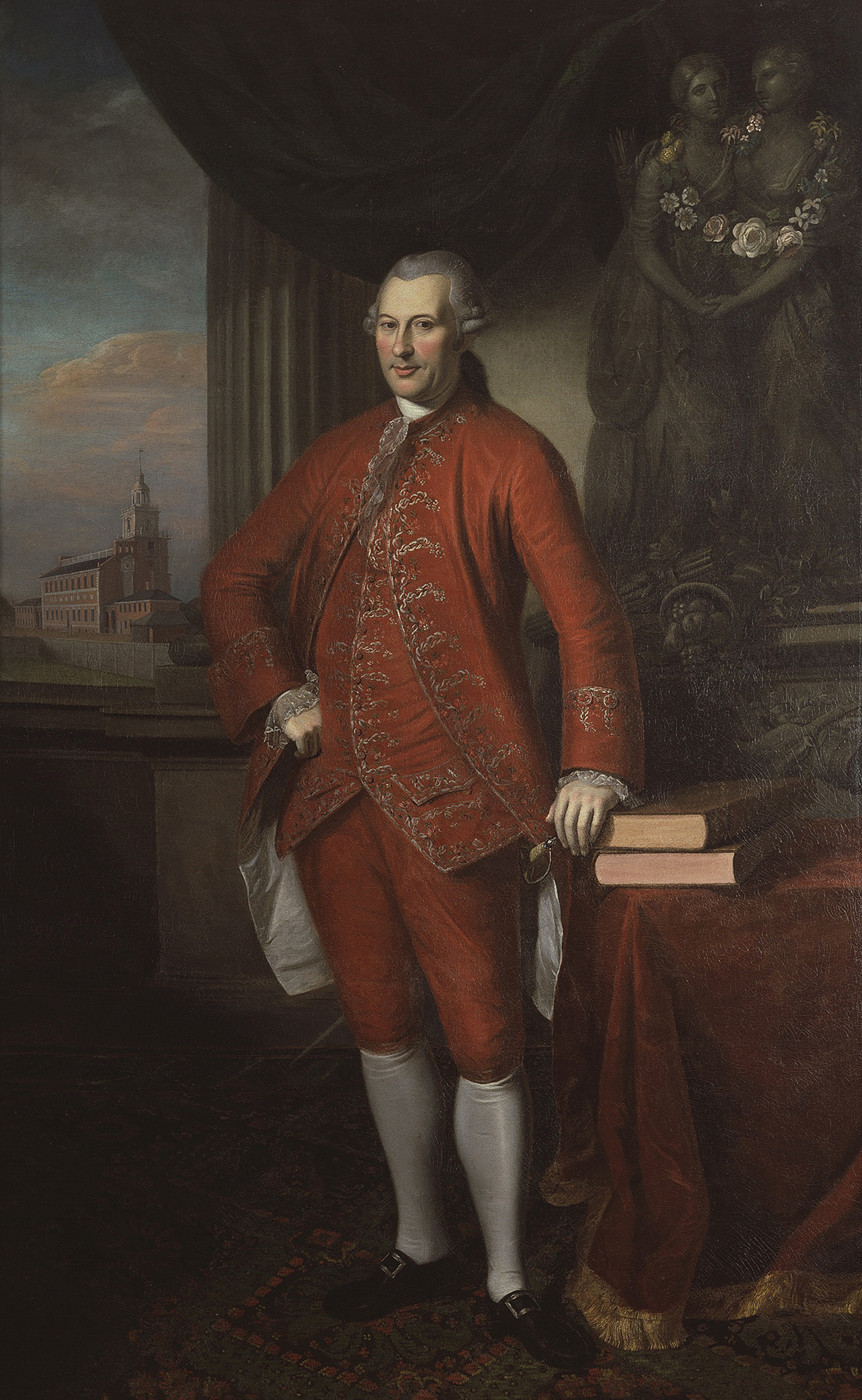
Conrad-Alexandre Gérard

The Treaty of Amity and Commerce was signed on February 6, 1778, at the Hôtel de Crillon by American delegates Benjamin Franklin, Silas Deane, and Arthur Lee, and the French representative to the U.S., Conrad Alexandre Gérard de Rayneva.

Congress received the signed text on May 2, 1778, and ratified it on May 4, 1778, by unanimous vote; not all states were represented in the vote, as New Hampshire and North Carolina were absent while the attendance of Delaware and Massachusetts are uncertain. Urgency overrode the necessity of having all thirteen states ratify the document.

The Treaty was ratified by France on July 16, 1778.

On September 1, 1778, Congress formally expunged Articles 11 and 12, which dealt with import duties and exportation of molasses, respectively. Upon the Treaty's first printing in France the following month, references to these articles were removed, and all subsequent articles were renumbered.

== Aftermath and significance ==
While France had aided the colonists as early as June 1775, its support was largely clandestine and led by envoys and donors acting in their individual capacities. Along with the Treaty of Alliance, the Treaty of Amity and Commerce resulted in substantial and full-fledged support of the American cause, in the form of loans, military equipment, naval forces, technical and strategic assistance, and manpower. Aside from the direct strategic benefits, French recognition served to turn an "otherwise lopsided colonial rebellion" into a larger conflict, as France was the only nation roughly on parity with Britain. Open diplomatic support by the leading power of continental Europe also served to legitimatize the newly emerging United States, which in turn would invite other nations to recognize American independence and provide aid.

Shortly after the treaties were signed, French aid grew significantly and substantively. Over 12,000 soldiers, 22,000 sailors, and 63 warships served in the rebellion. Military leaders such as Lafayette and Comte de Rochambeau played a decisive role in the American victories at the Chesapeake and at Yorktown, which together hastened the end of the conflict. France played a leading role in brokering the 1783 Treaty of Paris that formally ended the war and led to de jure American independence; pursuant to the Treaty of Alliance, only when Britain and France settled their differences did the United States sign the Treaty of Paris.

== See also ==
- List of treaties

== Sources ==
- Giunta, Mary A., ed. Documents of the Emerging Nation: U.S. Foreign Relations 1775–1789. Wilmington, Del.: Scholarly Resources Inc., 1998.
- Middlekauff, Robert. The Glorious Cause: The American Revolution, 1763–1789. New York: Oxford University Press, 1982.
- "Treaty of Amity and Commerce," The Avalon Project at Yale Law School. Accessed February 5, 2018.
